= List of members of the Uttar Pradesh Legislative Council =

The list of Current and past members from the Uttar Pradesh Legislative Council State. State elect members for the term of 6 years. 38 members are indirectly elected by the state legislators. 36 members are elected from Local Authorities Constituency, 8 from Graduates Constituency and 8 from Teachers Constituency. Governor of Uttar Pradesh nominated up to 10 members from eminent people from various fields.

== Chronological List of all Members of Legislative Council from Uttar Pradesh State ==
Chronological List by Last date of appointment

The list is Incomplete.

- Star (*) Represents current members from UP State.
- MLA - elected by Members of Uttar Pradesh Legislative Assembly
- LA - elected by Members of Local Authorities
- GR - Graduates'
- TA - Teachers'
- NOM - Nominated by Governor of Uttar Pradesh

Name	Party	Constituency	Term start	Term end	Term	Notes
Bahoran Lal Maurya	BJP	MLA	06-Jul-2024	05-Jul-2028	1	by-resignation of Swami Prasad Maurya
Vijay Bahadur Pathak	BJP	MLA	06-May-2024	05-May-2030	2	
Mahendra Kumar Singh	BJP	MLA	06-May-2024	05-May-2030	3	
Ashok Kataria	BJP	MLA	06-May-2024	05-May-2030	2	
Santosh Singh	BJP	MLA	06-May-2024	05-May-2030		
Dharmendra Singh	BJP	MLA	06-May-2024	05-May-2030		
Ram Tirath Singhal	BJP	MLA	06-May-2024	05-May-2030		
Mohit Beniwal	BJP	MLA	06-May-2024	05-May-2030		
Ashish Singh Patel	ADS	MLA	06-May-2024	05-May-2030	2	
Yogesh Choudhary	RLD	MLA	06-May-2024	05-May-2030	1	
Vichhelal Rajbhar	SBSP	MLA	06-May-2024	05-May-2030	1	
Balram Yadav	SP	MLA	06-May-2024	05-May-2030		
Shah Alam	SP	MLA	06-May-2024	05-May-2030	1	
Kiranpal Kashyap	SP	MLA	06-May-2024	05-May-2030		
Dara Singh Chauhan	BJP	MLA	29-Jan-2024	30-Jan-2027	1	bye - resignation of Dinesh Sharma
Padamsen Chaudhary	BJP	MLA	29-May-2023	05-Jul-2028	1	bye - death of Banwari Lal Dohre
Manvendra Singh Chauhan	BJP	MLA	29-May-2023	30-Jan-2027	1	bye - resignation of Lakshman Acharya
Rajnikant Maheshwari	BJP	NOM	03-Apr-2023	02-Apr-2029	1	
Saket Misra	BJP	NOM	03-Apr-2023	02-Apr-2029	1	
Ram Subhag Rajbhar	BJP	NOM	03-Apr-2023	02-Apr-2029	1	
Hans Raj Vishwakarma	BJP	NOM	03-Apr-2023	02-Apr-2029	1	
Tariq Mansoor	BJP	NOM	03-Apr-2023	02-Apr-2029	1	
Lal ji Prasad	BJP	NOM	03-Apr-2023	02-Apr-2029	1	
Jai Pal Singh	BJP	Bareilly–Moradabad GR	13-Feb-2023	12-Feb-2029		
Devendra Pratap Singh	BJP	Gorakhpur–Faizabad GR	13-Feb-2023	12-Feb-2029		
Arun Pathak	BJP	Kanpur GR	13-Feb-2023	12-Feb-2029		
Raj Bahadur Singh Chandel	Ind	Kanpur TA	13-Feb-2023	12-Feb-2029		
Babu Lal Tiwari	BJP	Allahabad–Jhansi TA	13-Feb-2023	12-Feb-2029		
Dharmendra Senthwar	BJP	MLA	11-Aug-2022	30-Jan-2027		bye - death of Ahmed Hasan
Nirmala Paswan	BJP	MLA	11-Aug-2022	05-May-2024		bye - resignation of Thakur Jaivir Singh
Daya Shankar Mishra	BJP	MLA	07-Jul-2022	06-Jul-2028	1	
Mukesh Sharma	BJP	MLA	07-Jul-2022	06-Jul-2028		
Jayendra Pratap Singh Rathore	BJP	MLA	07-Jul-2022	06-Jul-2028		
Bhupendra Chaudhary	BJP	MLA	07-Jul-2022	06-Jul-2028	2	
Keshav Prasad Maurya	BJP	MLA	07-Jul-2022	06-Jul-2028	2	
Jaswant Saini	BJP	MLA	07-Jul-2022	06-Jul-2028		
Narendra Kumar Kashyap	BJP	MLA	07-Jul-2022	06-Jul-2028		
Banwari Lal Dohre	BJP	MLA	07-Jul-2022	15-Feb-2023		expired
Danish Azad Ansari	BJP	MLA	07-Jul-2022	06-Jul-2028	1	
Mukul Yadav	SP	MLA	07-Jul-2022	06-Jul-2028		
Swami Prasad Maurya	SP	MLA	07-Jul-2022	20-Feb-2024	3	resigned
Mohammad Jasmir Ansari	SP	MLA	07-Jul-2022	06-Jul-2028		
Shahnawaz Khan	SP	MLA	07-Jul-2022	06-Jul-2028		
Dinesh Pratap Singh	BJP	Raebareli LA	12-Apr-2022	11-Apr-2028	3	
Brijesh Singh (Prinshu)	BJP	Jaunpur LA	12-Apr-2022	11-Apr-2028	2	
Vandana Verma	BJP	Muzaffarnagar-Saharanpur LA	12-Apr-2022	11-Apr-2028		
Satyapal Singh Saini	BJP	Moradabad–Bijnor LA	12-Apr-2022	11-Apr-2028	1	
Kunwar Maharaj Singh	BJP	Rampur–Bareilly LA	12-Apr-2022	11-Apr-2028		
Sudhir Gupta	BJP	Pilibhit–Shahjahanpur LA	12-Apr-2022	11-Apr-2028		
Ashok Agrawal	BJP	Hardoi LA	12-Apr-2022	11-Apr-2028		
Anoop Kumar Gupta	BJP	Lakhimpur Kheri LA	12-Apr-2022	11-Apr-2028		
Pawan Singh Chauhan	BJP	Sitapur LA	12-Apr-2022	11-Apr-2028		
Ram Chandra Pradhan	BJP	Lucknow–Unnao LA	12-Apr-2022	11-Apr-2028	2	
Akshay Pratap Singh	JSD	Pratapgarh LA	12-Apr-2022	11-Apr-2028	5	
Shailendra Pratap Singh	BJP	Sultanpur LA	12-Apr-2022	11-Apr-2028	5	
Angad Singh	BJP	Barabanki LA	12-Apr-2022	11-Apr-2028		
Pragya Tripathi	BJP	Bahraich LA	12-Apr-2022	11-Apr-2028	1	
Awadhesh Kumar Singh	BJP	Gonda LA	12-Apr-2022	11-Apr-2028	1	
Hariom Pandey	BJP	Faizabad LA	12-Apr-2022	11-Apr-2028	1	
Subhash Yaduvansh	BJP	Basti–Siddharth Nagar LA	12-Apr-2022	11-Apr-2028		
CP Chand	BJP	Gorakhpur–Maharajganj LA	12-Apr-2022	11-Apr-2028		
Dr. Ratanpal Singh	BJP	Deoria LA	12-Apr-2022	11-Apr-2028		
Vikrant Singh "Rishu"	Ind	Azamgarh–Mau LA	12-Apr-2022	11-Apr-2028	1	
Ravishanker Singh	BJP	Ballia LA	12-Apr-2022	11-Apr-2028		
Shyam Narayan Singh Alia Vineet Singh	BJP	Mirzapur–Sonbhadra LA	12-Apr-2022	11-Apr-2028	2	
Dr KP Srivastav	BJP	Allahabad LA	12-Apr-2022	11-Apr-2028		
Jitendra Singh Sengar	BJP	Banda–Hamirpur LA	12-Apr-2022	11-Apr-2028		
Rama Niranjan	BJP	Jhansi–Jalaun–Lalitpur LA	12-Apr-2022	11-Apr-2028		
Avinash Singh Chauhan	BJP	Kanpur–Fatehpur LA	12-Apr-2022	11-Apr-2028		
Pranshu Dutt Dwivedi	BJP	Etawah–Farrukhabad LA	12-Apr-2022	11-Apr-2028	1	
Vijay Shivhare	BJP	Agra–Firozabad LA	12-Apr-2022	11-Apr-2028		
Ashish Yadav Ashu	BJP	Mathura–Etah–Mainpuri LA	12-Apr-2022	11-Apr-2028		
Om Prakash Singh	BJP	Mathura–Etah–Mainpuri LA	12-Apr-2022	11-Apr-2028		
Chaudhary Rishipal Singh	BJP	Aligarh-Hathras LA	12-Apr-2022	11-Apr-2028		
Narendra Bhati	BJP	Bulandshahar-Noida LA	12-Apr-2022	11-Apr-2028		
Dharmendra Bhardwaj	BJP	Meerut–Ghaziabad LA	12-Apr-2022	11-Apr-2028		
Vishal Singh Chanchal	BJP	Ghazipur LA	12-Apr-2022	11-Apr-2028	2	
Annapurna Singh	Ind	Varanasi LA	12-Apr-2022	11-Apr-2028	2	
Vagish Pathak	BJP	Badaun LA	12-Apr-2022	11-Apr-2028		
Jitin Prasada	BJP	NOM	01-Oct-2021	04-Jun-2024	1	resigned after being elected to Lok Sabha
Choudhary Virender Singh	BJP	NOM	01-Oct 2021	30-Sep-2027		
Gopal Anjan Bhurji	BJP	NOM	01-Oct 2021	30-Sep-2027		
Sanjay Nishad	NP	NOM	01-Oct 2021	30-Sep-2027	1	
Dinesh Sharma	BJP	MLA	31-Jan-2021	09-Sep-2023	2	resigned after being elected to Rajya Sabha
Govind Narayan Shukla	BJP	MLA	31-Jan-2021	30-Jan-2027	1	
A. K. Sharma	BJP	MLA	31-Jan-2021	30-Jan-2027	1	
Ashwani Tyagi	BJP	MLA	31-Jan-2021	30-Jan-2027		
Kunwar Manvendra Singh	BJP	MLA	31-Jan-2021	30-Jan-2027		
Salil Vishnoi	BJP	MLA	31-Jan-2021	30-Jan-2027		
Swatantra Dev Singh	BJP	MLA	31-Jan-2021	30-Jan-2027	3	
Dharmveer Prajapati	BJP	MLA	31-Jan-2021	30-Jan-2027		
Lakshman Acharya	BJP	MLA	31-Jan-2021	15-Feb-2023		appointed as Governor of Sikkim
Surendra Choudhary	BJP	MLA	31-Jan-2021	30-Jan-2027		
Rajendra Chaudhary	SP	MLA	31-Jan-2021	30-Jan-2027		
Ahmed Hasan	SP	MLA	31-Jan-2021	19-Feb-2022		expired
Manvendra Pratap Singh	BJP	Agra GR	1-Dec-2020	30-Nov-2026		
Dinesh Kumar Goel	BJP	Meerut GR	1-Dec-2020	30-Nov-2026		
Awanish Kumar Singh	BJP	Lucknow GR	1-Dec-2020	30-Nov-2026		
Ashutosh Sinha	SP	Varanasi GR	1-Dec-2020	30-Nov-2026		
Man Singh Yadav	SP	Allahabad–Jhansi GR	1-Dec-2020	30-Nov-2026		
Hari Singh Dhillon	BJP	Bareilly–Moradabad TA	1-Dec-2020	30-Nov-2026		
Umesh Dwivedi	BJP	Lucknow TA	1-Dec-2020	30-Nov-2026		
Shri Chand Sharma	BJP	Meerut TA	1-Dec-2020	30-Nov-2026		
Akash Agarwal	Ind	Agra TA	1-Dec-2020	30-Nov-2026		
Dhruv Kumar Tripathi	Ind	Gorakhpur–Faizabad TA	1-Dec-2020	30-Nov-2026		
Lal Bihari Yadav	SP	Varanasi TA	1-Dec-2020	30-Nov-2026		
Vijay Bahadur Pathak	BJP	MLA	06-May-2018	05-May-2024		
Mahendra Kumar Singh	BJP	MLA	06-May-2018	05-May-2024	2	
Thakur Jaivir Singh	BJP	MLA	06-May-2018	24-Mar-2022		elected to Barauli Assembly
Yashwant Singh	BJP	MLA	06-May-2018	05-May-2024		
Ashok Dhawan	BJP	MLA	06-May-2018	05-May-2024		
Sarojini Agarwal	BJP	MLA	06-May-2018	05-May-2024		
Ashok Kataria	BJP	MLA	06-May-2018	05-May-2024	1	
Vidya Sagar Sonkar	BJP	MLA	06-May-2018	05-May-2024		
Mohsin Raza	BJP	MLA	06-May-2018	05-May-2024	2	
Bukkal Nawab	BJP	MLA	06-May-2018	05-May-2024		
Naresh Uttam Patel	SP	MLA	06-May-2018	05-May-2024		
Bhimrao Ambedkar	BSP	MLA	06-May-2018	05-May-2024	1	
Ashish Singh Patel	ADS	MLA	06-May-2018	05-May-2024	1	
Yogi Adityanath	BJP	MLA	18-Sep-2017	06-Jul-2022	1	bye - resignation of Yashwant Singh
Keshav Prasad Maurya	BJP	MLA	18-Sep-2017	06-Jul-2022	1	bye - resignation of Bukkal Nawab
Mohsin Raza	BJP	MLA	18-Sep-2017	05-May-2018	1	bye - resignation of Thakur Jaivir Singh
Dinesh Sharma	BJP	MLA	18-Sep-2017	30-Jan-2021	1	bye - resignation of Ashok Bajpai
Swatantra Dev Singh	BJP	MLA	18-Sep-2017	30-Jan-2021	2	bye - resignation of Sarojini Agarwal
Devendra Pratap Singh	BJP	Gorakhpur–Faizabad GR	13-Feb-2017	12-Feb-2023		
Jai Pal Singh Vyast	BJP	Bareilly–Moradabad GR	13-Feb-2017	12-Feb-2023		
Arun Pathak	BJP	Kanpur GR	13-Feb-2017	12-Feb-2023		
Raj Bahadur Singh Chandel	Ind	Kanpur TA	13-Feb-2017	12-Feb-2023		
Suresh Kumar Tripathi	Ind	Allahabad–Jhansi TA	13-Feb-2017	12-Feb-2023		
Kamlesh Pathak	SP	MLA	07-Jul-2016	06-Jul-2022		
Rannvijay Singh Gonda	SP	MLA	07-Jul-2016	06-Jul-2022	1	
Jagjivan Prasad Babu	SP	MLA	07-Jul-2016	06-Jul-2022		
Balram Yadav	SP	MLA	07-Jul-2016	06-Jul-2022		
Ram Sundar Das Nishad	SP	MLA	07-Jul-2016	06-Jul-2022		
Yashwant Singh	SP	MLA	07-Jul-2016	29-Jul-2017		resigned
Bukkal Nawab	SP	MLA	07-Jul-2016	29-Jul-2017		resigned
Shatarudra Prakash	SP	MLA	07-Jul-2016	06-Jul-2022		
Atar Singh Rao	BSP	MLA	07-Jul-2016	06-Jul-2022		
Dinesh Chandra	BSP	MLA	07-Jul-2016	06-Jul-2022		
Suresh Kashyap	BSP	MLA	07-Jul-2016	06-Jul-2022		
Bhupendra Chaudhary	BJP	MLA	07-Jul-2016	06-Jul-2022	1	
Deepak Singh	INC	MLA	07-Jul-2016	06-Jul-2022		
Dinesh Pratap Singh	INC	Raebareli LA	08-Mar-2016	07-Mar-2022	2	
Brijesh Singh (Prinshu)	BSP	Jaunpur LA	08-Mar-2016	07-Mar-2022	1	
Mahmood Ali	BSP	Muzaffarnagar-Saharanpur LA	08-Mar-2016	07-Mar-2022		
Parvez Ali	SP	Moradabad–Bijnor LA	08-Mar-2016	07-Mar-2022		
Ghanshyam Singh Lodhi	SP	Rampur–Bareilly LA	08-Mar-2016	07-Mar-2022		
Amit Yadav	SP	Pilibhit–Shahjahanpur LA	08-Mar-2016	07-Mar-2022		
Misbahuddin	SP	Hardoi LA	08-Mar-2016	07-Mar-2022		
Shashank Yadav	SP	Lakhimpur Kheri LA	08-Mar-2016	07-Mar-2022		
Anand Bhadauriya	SP	Sitapur LA	08-Mar-2016	07-Mar-2022	1	
Sunil Singh Yadav	SP	Lucknow–Unnao LA	08-Mar-2016	07-Mar-2022		
Akshay Pratap Singh	SP	Pratapgarh LA	08-Mar-2016	07-Mar-2022	4	
Shailendra Pratap Singh	SP	Sultanpur LA	08-Mar-2016	07-Mar-2022	4	
Rajesh Yadav	SP	Barabanki LA	08-Mar-2016	07-Mar-2022		
Mohammad Imlaq Khan	SP	Bahraich LA	08-Mar-2016	07-Mar-2022		
Mahfooz Khan	SP	Gonda LA	08-Mar-2016	07-Mar-2022	2	
Hiralal Yadav	SP	Faizabad LA	08-Mar-2016	07-Mar-2022		
Santosh Yadav	SP	Basti–Siddharth Nagar LA	08-Mar-2016	07-Mar-2022		
C. P. Chandra	SP	Gorakhpur–Maharajganj LA	08-Mar-2016	07-Mar-2022		
Ramawadh Yadav	SP	Deoria LA	08-Mar-2016	07-Mar-2022		
Rakesh Kumar Yadav	SP	Azamgarh–Mau LA	08-Mar-2016	07-Mar-2022		
Ravi Shankar Singh	SP	Ballia LA	08-Mar-2016	07-Mar-2022		
Ramlali Mishra	SP	Mirzapur–Sonbhadra LA	08-Mar-2016	07-Mar-2022		
Vasudev Yadav	SP	Allahabad LA	08-Mar-2016	07-Mar-2022		
Ramesh Mishra	SP	Banda–Hamirpur LA	08-Mar-2016	07-Mar-2022		
Rama Niranjan	SP	Jhansi–Jalaun–Lalitpur LA	08-Mar-2016	07-Mar-2022		
Pappu Yadav	SP	Kanpur–Fatehpur LA	08-Mar-2016	07-Mar-2022		
Pushpraj Jain	SP	Etawah–Farrukhabad LA	08-Mar-2016	07-Mar-2022		
Dilip Yadav	SP	Agra–Firozabad LA	08-Mar-2016	07-Mar-2022		
Udayveer Singh	SP	Mathura–Etah–Mainpuri LA	08-Mar-2016	07-Mar-2022		
Arvind Yadav	SP	Mathura–Etah–Mainpuri LA	08-Mar-2016	07-Mar-2022		
Jaswant Singh	SP	Aligarh-Hathras LA	08-Mar-2016	07-Mar-2022		
Narendra Singh Bhati	SP	Bulandshahar-Noida LA	08-Mar-2016	07-Mar-2022		
Rakesh Yadav	SP	Meerut–Ghaziabad LA	08-Mar-2016	07-Mar-2022		
Vishal Singh Chanchal	Ind	Ghazipur LA	08-Mar-2016	07-Mar-2022	1	
Brijesh Kumar Singh	Ind	Varanasi LA	08-Mar-2016	07-Mar-2022	1	
Banwari Singh Yadav	SP	Badaun LA	08-Mar-2016	07-Mar-2022		
Ashok Bajpai	SP	MLA	31-Jan-2015	04-Aug-2017		resigned
Sarojini Agarwal	SP	MLA	31-Jan-2015	04-Aug-2017		resigned
Ashu Malik	SP	MLA	31-Jan-2015	30-Jan-2021		
Ramesh Yadav	SP	MLA	31-Jan-2015	30-Jan-2021		
Ahmed Hasan	SP	MLA	31-Jan-2015	30-Jan-2021		
Sahab Singh Saini	SP	MLA	31-Jan-2015	30-Jan-2021		
Ramjatan Rajbhar	SP	MLA	31-Jan-2015	30-Jan-2021		
Choudhary Virender Singh	SP	MLA	31-Jan-2015	30-Jan-2021		
Pradeep Kumar Jatav	BSP	MLA	31-Jan-2015	30-Jan-2021		
Dharamveer Singh Ashok	BSP	MLA	31-Jan-2015	30-Jan-2021		
Nasimuddin Siddiqui	BSP	MLA	31-Jan-2015	30-Jan-2021		
Lakshman Acharya	BJP	MLA	31-Jan-2015	30-Jan-2021		
Arun Pathak	BJP	Kanpur GR	19-Jan-2015	16-Nov-2016		bye - death of Jagendra Swarup
Jai Pal Singh Vyast	BJP	Bareilly–Moradabad GR	11-Nov-2014	16-Nov-2016		bye - resignation of Naipal Singh
Aseem Yadav	SP	Agra GR	07-May-2014	06-May-2020		
Hem Singh Pundir	Ind	Meerut GR	07-May-2014	06-May-2020		
Kanti Singh	Ind	Lucknow GR	07-May-2014	06-May-2020		
Kedar Nath Singh	BJP	Varanasi GR	07-May-2014	06-May-2020		
Yagyadatt Sharma	BJP	Allahabad–Jhansi GR	07-May-2014	06-May-2020		
Sanjay Kumar Mishra	SP	Bareilly–Moradabad TA	07-May-2014	06-May-2020		
Umesh Dwivedi	Ind	Lucknow TA	07-May-2014	06-May-2020		
Om Prakash Sharma	Ind	Meerut TA	07-May-2014	06-May-2020	8	
Jagveer Kishore Jain	Ind	Agra TA	07-May-2014	06-May-2020		
Dhruv Kumar Tripathi	Ind	Gorakhpur–Faizabad TA	07-May-2014	06-May-2020		
Chet Narayan Singh	Ind	Varanasi TA	07-May-2014	06-May-2020		
Arunveer Singh	SP	Bahraich LA	27-Jul-2012	15-Jan-2016	1	bye - resignation of Madhuri Verma
Bukkal Nawab	SP	MLA	20-Jul-2012	06-Jul-2016		resignation of Mayawati
Akhilesh Yadav	SP	MLA	06-May-2012	05-May-2018	1	
Ambika Chaudhary	SP	MLA	06-May-2012	05-May-2018		
Madhu Gupta	SP	MLA	06-May-2012	05-May-2018		
Naresh Uttam Patel	SP	MLA	06-May-2012	05-May-2018		
Ram Sakal Gurjar	SP	MLA	06-May-2012	05-May-2018		
Vijay Yadav	SP	MLA	06-May-2012	05-May-2018		
Rajendra Chaudhary	SP	MLA	06-May-2012	05-May-2018		
Umar Ali Khan	SP	MLA	06-May-2012	05-May-2018		
Thakur Jaivir Singh	BSP	MLA	06-May-2012	29-Jul-2017		resigned
Sunil Kumar Chittod	BSP	MLA	06-May-2012	05-May-2018		
Vijay Pratap	BSP	MLA	06-May-2012	05-May-2018		
Mahendra Kumar Singh	BJP	MLA	06-May-2012	05-May-2018	1	
Chaudhary Mushtaq	RLD	MLA	06-May-2012	05-May-2018		
Mahesh Arya	BSP	MLA	17-Mar-2011	30-Jan-2015		resignation of Ram Raksha Pal
Devendra Pratap Singh		Gorakhpur–Faizabad GR	17-Nov-2010	16-Nov-2016		
Naipal Singh	BJP	Bareilly–Moradabad GR	17-Nov-2010	23-May-2014		elected to Rampur Lok Sabha
Jagendra Swarup	Ind	Kanpur GR	17-Nov-2010	30-Jul-2014	6	expired
Raj Bahadur Singh Chandel	Ind	Kanpur TA	17-Nov-2010	16-Nov-2016		
Suresh Kumar Tripathi		Allahabad–Jhansi TA	17-Nov-2010	16-Nov-2016		
Pradeep Kumar Jatav	BSP	MLA	23-Sep-2010	05-May-2012		bye - resignation of Jugal Kishore
Mayawati	BSP	MLA	07-Jul-2010	12-Apr-2012		resigned
Rishipal Gautam	BSP	MLA	07-Jul-2010	06-Jul-2016		
Satish Chandra Jatav	BSP	MLA	07-Jul-2010	06-Jul-2016		
Ram Kumar Kureel	BSP	MLA	07-Jul-2010	06-Jul-2016		
Subodh Parashar	BSP	MLA	07-Jul-2010	06-Jul-2016		
Mohammad Athar Khan	BSP	MLA	07-Jul-2010	06-Jul-2016		
Virendra Kumar Chauhan	BSP	MLA	07-Jul-2010	06-Jul-2016		
Lalchandra Nishad	BSP	MLA	07-Jul-2010	06-Jul-2016		
Balram Yadav	SP	MLA	07-Jul-2010	06-Jul-2016		
Ram Sunder Das Nishad	SP	MLA	07-Jul-2010	06-Jul-2016		
Yashwant Singh	SP	MLA	07-Jul-2010	06-Jul-2016		
Naseeb Pathan	INC	MLA	07-Jul-2010	06-Jul-2016		
Hriday Narayan Dikshit	BJP	MLA	07-Jul-2010	06-Jul-2016		
Parmeshwar Lal Saini	BSP	Moradabad-Bijnor LA	16-Jan-2010	15-Jan-2016		
Kesar Singh	BSP	Rampur-Bareilly LA	16-Jan-2010	15-Jan-2016		
Jitendra Yadav	BSP	Budaun LA	16-Jan-2010	15-Jan-2016		
Kunwar Jayesh Prasad	BSP	Pilibhit-Shahjahanpur LA	16-Jan-2010	15-Jan-2016		
Abdul Hannan	BSP	Hardoi LA	16-Jan-2010	15-Jan-2016		
R. S. Kushwaha	BSP	Kheri LA	16-Jan-2010	15-Jan-2016		
Rakesh Singh	BSP	Sitapur LA	16-Jan-2010	15-Jan-2016		
Arvind Kumar Tripathi	BSP	Lucknow-Unnao LAC	16-Jan-2010	15-Jan-2016		
Dinesh Pratap Singh	INC	Raebareli LA	16-Jan-2010	15-Jan-2016		
Akshay Pratap Singh	SP	Pratapgargh LA	16-Jan-2010	15-Jan-2016		
Ashok Singh	BSP	Sultanpur LA	16-Jan-2010	15-Jan-2016		
Hargovind Singh	BSP	Barabanki LA	16-Jan-2010	25-Feb-2015		resigned
Madhuri Verma	BSP	Bahraich LA	16-Jan-2010	12-Mar-2012		elected to Nanpara Assembly
Savita Singh	BSP	Gonda LA	16-Jan-2010	15-Jan-2016		
Manoj Kumar Singh	BSP	Faizabad LA	16-Jan-2010	15-Jan-2016		
Manish Jaiswal	BSP	Basti-Siddharth Nagar LA	16-Jan-2010	15-Jan-2016		
Ganesh Shanker Pandey	BSP	Gorakhpur-Maharajganj LA	16-Jan-2010	15-Jan-2016		
Sanjeev Dwivedi	BSP	Deoria LA	16-Jan-2010	15-Jan-2016		
Kailash Yadav	BSP	Azamgarh-Mau LA	16-Jan-2010	15-Jan-2016		
Ravi Shanker Singh	BSP	Ballia LA	16-Jan-2010	15-Jan-2016		
Rajdev Singh	BSP	Ghazipur LA	16-Jan-2010	15-Jan-2016		
Prabhawati Pal	BSP	Jaunpur LA	16-Jan-2010	05-Oct-2015		resigned
Annapurna Singh	BSP	Varanasi LA	16-Jan-2010	15-Jan-2016		
Shyam Narayan Singh alias vineet	BSP	Mirzapur-Sonbhadra LA	16-Jan-2010	15-Jan-2016		
Suraj Bhan Karwaria	BSP	Allahabad LA	16-Jan-2010	15-Jan-2016		
Husna Siddiqui	BSP	Banda-Hamirpur LA	16-Jan-2010	15-Jan-2016		
Sant Ram Niranjan	BSP	Jhansi-Jalaun-Lalitpur LA	16-Jan-2010	15-Jan-2016		
Ashok Katiyar	BSP	Kanpur-Fatehpur LA	16-Jan-2010	15-Jan-2016		
Manoj Agarwal	BSP	Etawah-Farrukhabad LA	16-Jan-2010	15-Jan-2016		
Veeru Suman	BSP	Agra-Firozabad LA	16-Jan-2010	15-Jan-2016		
Lekhraj	BSP	Mathura-Etah-Mainpuri LA	16-Jan-2010	15-Jan-2016		
Chandrapratap Singh Yadav	BSP	Mathura-Etah-Mainpuri LA	16-Jan-2010	15-Jan-2016		
Mukul Upadhyay	BSP	Aligarh LA	16-Jan-2010	15-Jan-2016		
Anil Kumar Awana	BSP	Bulandshahar LA	16-Jan-2010	15-Jan-2016		
Prashant Chaudhary	BSP	Meerut-Ghaziabad LA	16-Jan-2010	15-Jan-2016		
Mohammed Iqbal	BSP	Muzaffarnagar-Saharanpur LA	16-Jan-2010	15-Jan-2016		
Nasimuddin Siddiqui	BSP	MLA	31-Jan-2009	30-Jan-2015		
Dharam Prakash Bhartiya	BSP	MLA	31-Jan-2009	30-Jan-2015		
Ram Raksha Pal	BSP	MLA	31-Jan-2009	09-Dec-2010		resigned
Om Prakash Tripathi	BSP	MLA	31-Jan-2009	30-Jan-2015		
Ashok Siddharth	BSP	MLA	31-Jan-2009	30-Jan-2015		
Pratap Singh Baghel	BSP	MLA	31-Jan-2009	30-Jan-2015		
Lokesh Prajapati	BSP	MLA	31-Jan-2009	30-Jan-2015		
Ramesh Yadav	SP	MLA	31-Jan-2009	30-Jan-2015		
Ahmed Hasan	SP	MLA	31-Jan-2009	30-Jan-2015		
Sarojini Agarwal	SP	MLA	31-Jan-2009	30-Jan-2015		
Vinod Panday	BJP	MLA	31-Jan-2009	30-Jan-2015		
Baburam M.Com	BJP	MLA	31-Jan-2009	30-Jan-2015		
Vivek Bansal	INC	Agra GR	07-May-2008	06-May-2014		
Hem Singh Pundir	Ind	Meerut GR	07-May-2008	06-May-2014		
Shiv Pal Singh	Ind	Lucknow GR	07-May-2008	06-May-2014		
Kedar Nath Singh	BJP	Varanasi GR	07-May-2008	06-May-2014		
Yagyadatt Sharma	BJP	Allahabad–Jhansi GR	07-May-2008	06-May-2014		
Subash Chandra Sharma		Bareilly–Moradabad TA	07-May-2008	06-May-2014		
Devi Dayal Shastri		Lucknow TA	07-May-2008	06-May-2014		
Om Prakash Sharma		Meerut TA	07-May-2008	06-May-2014		
Jagvir Kishor Jain		Agra TA	07-May-2008	06-May-2014		
Dhruv Kumar Tripathi		Gorakhpur–Faizabad TA	07-May-2008	06-May-2014		
Chet Narayan Singh		Varanasi TA	07-May-2008	06-May-2014		
Mayawati	BSP	MLA	28-Jun-2007	06-Jul-2010		bye - death of Vikramaditya Pandey
Swami Prasad Maurya	BSP	MLA	28-Jun-2007	30-Jan-2009		bye - death of Barkhuram Verma
Kashinath Yadav	SP	MLA	06-May-2006	05-May-2012		
Khwaja Haleem	SP	MLA	06-May-2006	05-May-2012		
Ram Sharan Das Gujjar	SP	MLA	06-May-2006	21-Nov-2008		expired
Rakesh Singh Rana	SP	MLA	06-May-2006	05-May-2012		
Naresh Uttam Patel	SP	MLA	06-May-2006	05-May-2012		
Daya Ram Prajapati	SP	MLA	06-May-2006	05-May-2012		
Ramapati Ram Tripathi	BJP	MLA	06-May-2006	05-May-2012		
Ashok Dhawan	BJP	MLA	06-May-2006	05-May-2012		
Ram Naresh Rawat	BJP	MLA	06-May-2006	05-May-2012		
Babu Singh Kushwaha	BSP	MLA	06-May-2006	05-May-2012		
Sunil Kumar Chittor	BSP	MLA	06-May-2006	05-May-2012		
Jugal Kishore	BSP	MLA	06-May-2006	17-Jun-2010		elected to Rajya Sabha
Harpal Saini	RLD	MLA	06-May-2006	05-May-2012		
Kedar Nath Singh	BJP	Varanasi GR	17-Dec-2004	05-May-2008		bye - resignation of Rajesh Kumar Mishra
Jagendra Swarup	Ind	Kanpur GR	17-Nov-2004	16-Nov-2010	5	
Anand Bhushan Singh	SP	Pratapgargh LA	06-Nov-2004	15-Jan-2010		bye - resignation of Akshay Pratap Singh
Gajay Singh	SP	Muzaffarnagar-Saharanpur LA	06-Nov-2004	15-Jan-2010		bye - resignation of Munawwar Hasan
Ranjeet Singh	SP	Lucknow-Unnao LAC	06-Nov-2004	15-Jan-2010		bye - death of Ajeet Singh
Anwar Ahmad	SP	MLA	07-Jul-2004	06-Jul-2010		
Ram Asrey Vishwakarma	SP	MLA	07-Jul-2004	06-Jul-2010		
Yashwant Singh	SP	MLA	07-Jul-2004	06-Jul-2010		
Vikramaditya Pandey	SP	MLA	07-Jul-2004	14-Jan-2007		
Subhash Chandra Yadav	SP	MLA	07-Jul-2004	06-Jul-2010		
Ram Naresh Yadav	SP	MLA	07-Jul-2004	06-Jul-2010		
Munna Singh Chauhan	RLD	MLA	07-Jul-2004	06-Jul-2010		
Jai Prakash Chaturvedi	BJP	MLA	07-Jul-2004	06-Jul-2010		
Swatantra Dev Singh	BJP	MLA	07-Jul-2004	06-Jul-2010		
Seema Rizvi	BJP	MLA	07-Jul-2004	19-Aug-2009		expired
Narendra Kashyap	BSP	MLA	07-Jul-2004	06-Jul-2010		
Hari Singh Dhillon		MLA	07-Jul-2004	06-Jul-2010		
Naseeb Pathan	INC	MLA	07-Jul-2004	06-Jul-2010		
Arvind Kumar	SP	Barabanki LA	10-Mar-2004	15-Jan-2010		bye - death of Pradeep Kumar Yadav
Jai Singh Yadav	SP	Allahabad LA	10-Mar-2004	15-Jan-2010		bye - death of Jawahar Singh Yadav
Akshay Pratap Singh	SP	Pratapgargh LA	16-Jan-2004	25-May-2004		elected to Pratapgarh Lok Sabha
Munawwar Hasan	SP	Muzaffarnagar-Saharanpur LA	16-Jan-2004	27-May-2004		elected to Muzaffarnagar Lok Sabha
Ajit Singh	SP	Lucknow-Unnao LA	16-Jan-2004	05-Sep-2004		expired
Pradeep Kumar Yadav	SP	Barabanki LA	16-Jan-2004	19-Jan-2004		expired
Nasimuddin Siddiqui	BSP	MLA	31-Jan-2003	30-Jan-2009		
Dharam Prakash Bhartiya	BSP	MLA	31-Jan-2003	30-Jan-2009		
Swami Prasad Maurya	BSP	MLA	31-Jan-2003	30-Jan-2009		
Srinath Advocate	BSP	MLA	31-Jan-2003	30-Jan-2009		
Surendra Nath Awasthi	BJP	MLA	31-Jan-2003	30-Jan-2009		
Rajkumar Tyagi	BJP	MLA	31-Jan-2003	30-Jan-2009		
Ramji Singh	BJP	MLA	31-Jan-2003	30-Jan-2009		
Ramesh Yadav	SP	MLA	31-Jan-2003	30-Jan-2009		
Vijay Yadav	SP	MLA	31-Jan-2003	30-Jan-2009		
Ahmed Hasan	SP	MLA	31-Jan-2003	30-Jan-2009		
Kusum Rai	RKP	MLA	31-Jan-2003	03-Dec-2008		elected to Rajya Sabha
Ranjeet Singh Judeo	INC	MLA	31-Jan-2003	30-Jan-2009		
Harnath Singh Yadav	SP	Agra GR	07-May-2002	06-May-2008		
Hem Singh Pundir	Ind	Meerut GR	07-May-2002	06-May-2008		
Shivpal Singh	Ind	Lucknow GR	07-May-2002	06-May-2008		
Rajesh Kumar Mishra	INC	Varanasi GR	07-May-2002	26-May-2004		elected to Varanasi Lok Sabha
Yagyadatt Sharma	BJP	Allahabad–Jhansi GR	07-May-2002	06-May-2008		
Subash Chandra Sharma		Bareilly–Moradabad TA	07-May-2002	06-May-2008		
Devi Dayal Shastri	Ind	Lucknow TA	07-May-2002	06-May-2008		
Om Prakash Sharma	Ind	Meerut TA	07-May-2002	06-May-2008		
Jagvir Kishore Jain	Ind	Agra TA	07-May-2002	06-May-2008		
Panchanan Rai	Ind	Gorakhpur–Faizabad TA	07-May-2002	05-Sep-2007		expired
Pramod Kumar Mishra	Ind	Varanasi TA	07-May-2002	06-May-2008		
Ramapati Ram Tripathi	BJP	MLA	06-May-2000	05-May-2006		
Kunwar Manvendra Singh	BJP	MLA	06-May-2000	05-May-2006		
Babulal Balwant Bind	BJP	MLA	06-May-2000	05-May-2006		
Ramchandra Balmiki	BJP	MLA	06-May-2000	05-May-2006		
Kashinath Yadav	SP	MLA	06-May-2000	05-May-2006		
Khwaja Haleem	SP	MLA	06-May-2000	05-May-2006		
Ram Sharan Das Gujjar	SP	MLA	06-May-2000	05-May-2006		
Babu Singh Kushwaha	BSP	MLA	06-May-2000	05-May-2006		
Dharamveer Singh Ashok	BSP	MLA	06-May-2000	05-May-2006		
Siraj Mehandi	ABLTC	MLA	06-May-2000	05-May-2006		
Devendra Pratap Singh	SP	Gorakhpur–Faizabad GR	17-Nov-1998	16-Nov-2004		
Naipal Singh	BJP	Bareilly–Moradabad GR	17-Nov-1998	16-Nov-2004		
Jagendra Swarup	Ind	Kanpur GR	17-Nov-1998	16-Nov-2004	4	
Raj Bahadur Singh Chandel	Ind	Kanpur TA	17-Nov-1998	16-Nov-2004		
Lavkush Kumar Mishra		Allahabad–Jhansi TA	17-Nov-1998	16-Nov-2004		
Seema Rizvi	BJP	MLA	19-Feb-1999	06-Jul-2004		bye - death of Aizaz Rizvi
Kalraj Mishra	BJP	MLA	07-Jul-1998	07-Jun-2001		elected to Rajya Sabha
Aizaz Rizvi	BJP	MLA	07-Jul-1998	11-Sep-1998		expired
Ram Prasad Kamal	BJP	MLA	07-Jul-1998	06-Jul-2004		
Sunder Singh Baghel	BJP	MLA	07-Jul-1998	06-Jul-2004		
Ram Swaroop	BJP	MLA	07-Jul-1998	06-Jul-2004		
Veer Sen Sirohi	BJP	MLA	07-Jul-1998	06-Jul-2004		
Bhagwati Singh	SP	MLA	07-Jul-1998	06-Jul-2004		
Ram Asrey Vishwakarma	SP	MLA	07-Jul-1998	06-Jul-2004		
Subhash Chandra Yadav	SP	MLA	07-Jul-1998	06-Jul-2004		
Narendra Kashyap	BSP	MLA	07-Jul-1998	06-Jul-2004		
Surendra Singh Nagar	Ind	MLA	07-Jul-1998	06-Jul-2004		
Masood Khan		MLA	07-Jul-1998	06-Jul-2004		
Rajesh Kumar Mishra	INC	Varanasi GR	06-May-1996	05-May-2002		
Lalji Verma	LD	MLA	07-July-1986	15-Jan-1991	1	

Name (Alphabetical Last Name)	Party	Constituency	Date of Appointment	Date of Retirement	Term	Notes
Balwant Singh Ramoowalia	SP	Nominated	2016	2022	1	
Om Prakash Sharma	Ind.	Meerut TA	1974	1980	1	
Om Prakash Sharma	Ind.	Meerut TA	1980	1986	2	
Om Prakash Sharma	Ind.	Meerut TA	1986	1992	3	
Om Prakash Sharma	Ind.	Meerut TA	1992	1998	4	
Om Prakash Sharma	Ind.	Meerut TA	1998	2002	5	
Om Prakash Sharma	Ind.	Meerut TA	2002	2008	6	
Om Prakash Sharma	Ind.	Meerut TA	2008	2014	7	
Sukhram Singh	SP	Kanpur-Fatehpur LA	1992	1998	1	
Sukhram Singh	SP	Kanpur-Fatehpur LA	2004	2010	2	
Lal Singh Tomar	SP	Kanpur-Fatehpur LA	1998	2004	1	
