= 2016 Rajya Sabha elections =

Elections for the upper house of Indian Parliament

- March 14 and June 11, 2016

72 seats to the Rajya Sabha (Note: Including 2 casual vacancies)
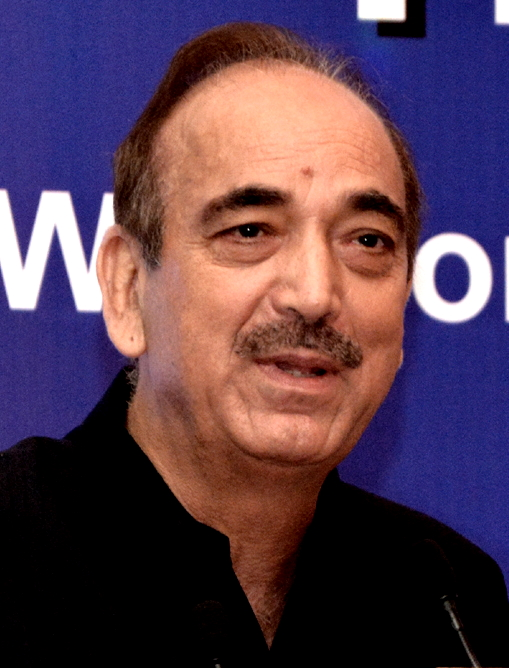

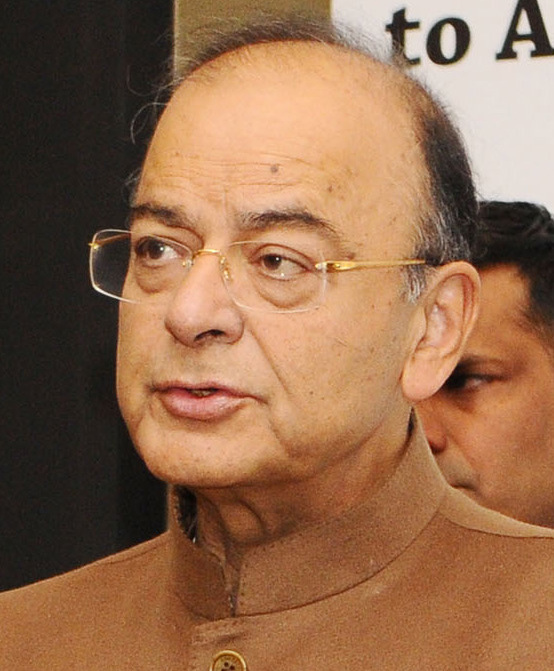
| | First party | Second party |
|---|---|---|
| Leader | Ghulam Nabi Azad | Arun Jaitley |
| Party | INC | BJP |
| Alliance | UPA | NDA |
| Leader since | June 8, 2014 | June 3, 2009 |
| Leader's seat | Jammu and Kashmir | Gujarat |
| Seats before | 66 | 48 |
| Seats won | 60 (including incumbents) | 55 (including incumbents) |
| Seat change | ▼6 | ▲7 |

The 2016 Rajya Sabha elections were held as part of a routine six-year cycle among certain of the State Legislatures in India on March 14 and June 11, 2016, to elect 13 and 57 of its 245 members, of which the states through their legislators elect 233, and the remaining 12 are appointed by the President. Being even-numbered, 2016 was a year in which about 30% of the State Legislature-elected 233-seat component of the body is elected.

There were also two by-elections, which are held if the incumbent resigns, dies, or is otherwise disqualified from serving.

== March elections ==
The election of March 14, 2016 was held to elect 13 members for duration of 6 years from 6 states to the Rajya Sabha. The seats in following states were up for election with terms of sitting members ending as: Assam - 2 seats, Himachal Pradesh - 1 seat, Kerala - 3 seats, Tripura - 1 seat all term ending on 2 April 201; Nagaland - 1 seat with term ending on 2 April 2016 but vacant since 26 November 2015 and Punjab - 5 seats with term ending on 9 April 2016.

=== Assam ===
| Seat No | Previous MP | Previous Party | Elected MP | Elected Party | Reference |
|---|---|---|---|---|---|
| 1 | Naznin Faruque | Congress | Ranee Narah | Congress | |
| 2 | Pankaj Bora | Congress | Ripun Bora | Congress | |

=== Himachal Pradesh ===
| Seat No | Previous MP | Previous Party | Elected MP | Elected Party | Reference |
|---|---|---|---|---|---|
| 1 | Bimla Kashyap Sood | BJP | Anand Sharma | Congress | |

=== Kerala ===
| Seat No | Previous MP | Previous Party | Elected MP | Elected Party | Reference |
|---|---|---|---|---|---|
| 1 | A. K. Antony | Congress | A. K. Antony | Congress | |
| 2 | K.N. Balagopal | CPI(M) | M. P. Veerendra Kumar | JD(U) | |
| 3 | T N Seema | CPI(M) | K. Somaprasad | CPI(M) | |

=== Nagaland ===
| Seat No | Previous MP | Previous Party | Elected MP | Elected Party | Reference |
|---|---|---|---|---|---|
| 1 | Khekiho Zhimomi; Vacant | NPF | K. G. Kenye | NPF | |

=== Tripura ===
| Seat No | Previous MP | Previous Party | Elected MP | Elected Party | Reference |
|---|---|---|---|---|---|
| 1 | Jharna Das | CPI(M) | Jharna Das | CPI(M) | |

=== Punjab ===
| Seat No | Previous MP | Previous Party | Elected MP | Elected Party | Reference |
|---|---|---|---|---|---|
| 1 | M S Gill | Congress | Pratap Singh Bajwa | Congress | |
| 2 | Ashwini Kumar | Congress | Shamsher Singh Dullo | Congress | |
| 3 | Sukhdev Singh Dhindsa | SAD | Sukhdev Singh Dhindsa | SAD | |
| 4 | Naresh Gujral | SAD | Naresh Gujral | SAD | |
| 5 | Avinash Rai Khanna | BJP | Shwet Malik | BJP | |

== June elections ==
The election of June 11, 2016 was held to elect 57 members from 15 states to the Rajya Sabha. The seats in following states were up for election:

=== Andhra Pradesh ===
| Seat No | Previous MP | Previous Party | Elected MP | Elected Party | Reference |
|---|---|---|---|---|---|
| 1 | Nirmala Sitaraman | BJP | Suresh Prabhu | BJP | |
| 2 | Sujana Chowdary | TDP | Sujana Chowdary | TDP | |
| 3 | Jairam Ramesh | Congress | T G Venkatesh | TDP | |
| 4 | Jesudasu Seelam | Congress | V. Vijaysai Reddy | YSRCP | |

=== Bihar ===
| Seat No | Previous MP | Previous Party | Elected MP | Elected Party | Reference |
|---|---|---|---|---|---|
| 1 | Sharad Yadav | JD(U) | Sharad Yadav | JD(U) | |
| 2 | Ramchandra Prasad Singh | JD(U) | Ramchandra Prasad Singh | JD(U) | |
| 3 | K. C. Tyagi | JD(U) | Ram Jethmalani | RJD | |
| 4 | Gulam Rasool Balyawi | JD(U) | Misa Bharti | RJD | |
| 5 | Pavan Kumar Varma | JD(U) | Gopal Narayan Singh | BJP | |

=== Chhattisgarh ===
| Seat No | Previous MP | Previous Party | Elected MP | Elected Party | Reference |
|---|---|---|---|---|---|
| 1 | Nand Kumar Sai | BJP | Ramvichar Netam | BJP | |
| 2 | Mohsina Kidwai | Congress | Chhaya Verma | Congress | |

=== Haryana ===
| Seat No | Previous MP | Previous Party | Elected MP | Elected Party | Reference |
|---|---|---|---|---|---|
| 1 | Birender Singh | BJP | Birender Singh | BJP | |
| 2 | Suresh Prabhu | BJP | Subhash Chandra | Independent | |

=== Jharkhand ===
| Seat No | Previous MP | Previous Party | Elected MP | Elected Party | Reference |
|---|---|---|---|---|---|
| 1 | M J Akbar | BJP | Mukhtar Abbas Naqvi | BJP | |
| 2 | Dhiraj Prasad Sahu | Congress | Mahesh Poddar | BJP | |

=== Karnataka ===
| Seat No | Previous MP | Previous Party | Elected MP | Elected Party | Reference |
|---|---|---|---|---|---|
| 1 | Oscar Fernandes | Congress | Oscar Fernandes | INC | |
| 2 | Aayanur Manjunath | BJP | Jairam Ramesh | INC | |
| 3 | Dr Vijay Mallya | Independent | K. C. Ramamurthy | INC | |
| 4 | M. Venkaiah Naidu | BJP | Nirmala Sitharaman | BJP | |

=== Madhya Pradesh ===
| Seat No | Previous MP | Previous Party | Elected MP | Elected Party | Reference |
|---|---|---|---|---|---|
| 1 | Anil Madhav Dave | BJP | Anil Madhav Dave | BJP | |
| 2 | Chandan Mitra | BJP | M. J. Akbar | BJP | |
| 3 | Dr Vijayalaxmi Sadho | Congress | Vivek Tankha | Congress | |

=== Maharashtra ===
| Seat No | Previous MP | Previous Party | Elected MP | Elected Party | Reference |
|---|---|---|---|---|---|
| 1 | Piyush Goyal | BJP | Piyush Goyal | BJP | |
| 2 | Ishwarlal Jain | NCP | Vinay Sahasrabuddhe | BJP | |
| 3 | Avinash Pande | Congress | Vikas Mahatme | BJP | |
| 4 | Vijay J. Darda | Congress | P. Chidambaram | Congress | |
| 5 | Praful Patel | NCP | Praful Patel | NCP | |
| 6 | Sanjay Raut | SHS | Sanjay Raut | SHS | |

=== Odisha ===
| Seat No | Previous MP | Previous Party | Elected MP | Elected Party | Reference |
|---|---|---|---|---|---|
| 1 | Baishnab Charan Parida | BJD | N. Bhaskar Rao | BJD | |
| 2 | Pyarimohan Mohapatra | BJD | Prasanna Acharya | BJD | |
| 3 | Bhupinder Singh | BJD | Bishnu Charan Das | BJD | |

=== Punjab ===
| Seat No | Previous MP | Previous Party | Elected MP | Elected Party | Reference |
|---|---|---|---|---|---|
| 1 | Ambika Soni | Congress | Ambika Soni | Congress | |
| 2 | Balwinder Singh Bhunder | SAD | Balwinder Singh Bhunder | SAD | |

=== Rajasthan ===
| Seat No | Previous MP | Previous Party | Elected MP | Elected Party | Reference |
|---|---|---|---|---|---|
| 1 | Ashk Ali Tak | Congress | Om Prakash Mathur | BJP | |
| 2 | Ram Jethmalani | BJP | M. Venkaiah Naidu | BJP | |
| 3 | Vijayendrapal Singh | BJP | Ram Kumar Verma | BJP | |
| 4 | Anand Sharma | Congress | Harshvardhan Singh | BJP | |

=== Tamil Nadu ===
| Seat No | Previous MP | Previous Party | Elected MP | Elected Party | Reference |
|---|---|---|---|---|---|
| 1 | K. P. Ramalingam | DMK | R. S. Bharathi | DMK | |
| 2 | S. Thangavelu | DMK | T. K. S. Elangovan | DMK | |
| 3 | A. Navaneethakrishnan | ADMK | A. Navaneethakrishnan | ADMK | |
| 4 | P. H. Paul Manoj Pandian | ADMK | S. R. Balasubramoniyan | ADMK | |
| 5 | A. W. Rabi Bernard | ADMK | A. Vijayakumar | ADMK | |
| 6 | E. M. Sudarsana Natchiappan | Congress | R. Vaithilingam | ADMK | |

=== Telangana ===
| Seat No | Previous MP | Previous Party | Elected MP | Elected Party | Reference |
|---|---|---|---|---|---|
| 1 | Gundu Sudha Rani | TDP | D. Srinivas | TRS | |
| 2 | V. Hanumantha Rao | Congress | V. Lakshmikantha Rao | TRS | |

=== Uttar Pradesh ===
| Seat No | Previous MP | Previous Party | Elected MP | Elected Party | Reference |
|---|---|---|---|---|---|
| 1 | Mukhtar Abbas Naqvi | BJP | Shiv Pratap Shukla | BJP | |
| 2 | Vishambhar Prasad Nishad | SP | Vishambhar Prasad Nishad | SP | |
| 3 | Smt Kanak Lata Singh | SP | Amar Singh | Independent | |
| 4 | Arvind Kumar Singh | SP | Surendra Nagar | SP | |
| 5 | Satish Sharma | Congress | Kapil Sibal | Congress | |
| 6 | Jugal Kishore | BSP | Sanjay Seth | SP | |
| 7 | Narendra Kumar Kashyap | BSP | Sukhram Singh Yadav | SP | |
| 8 | Salim Ansari | BSP | Rewati Raman Singh | SP | |
| 9 | Rajpal Singh Saini | BSP | Beni Prasad Verma | SP | |
| 10 | Satish Chandra Mishra | BSP | Satish Chandra Mishra | BSP | |
| 11 | Ambeth Rajan | BSP | Ashok Siddharth | BSP | |

=== Uttarakhand ===
| Seat No | Previous MP | Previous Party | Elected MP | Elected Party | Reference |
|---|---|---|---|---|---|
| 1 | Tarun Vijay | BJP | Pradeep Tamta | Congress | |

== By-elections ==
=== Gujarat ===
- A bye election was held on June 11, to fill the vacancy caused by death of Praveen Rashtrapal, who represented Gujarat. Parsottambhai Rupala was elected unopposed on June 3, for the vacancy with the term till 2 April 2018.

| S.No | Former MP | Party | Date of Vacancy | Elected MP | Party | Date of appointment | Date of retirement |
|---|---|---|---|---|---|---|---|
| 1 | Praveen Rashtrapal | Indian National Congress | 12 May 2016 | Parshottam Rupala | Bharatiya Janata Party | 11 June 2016 | 2 April 2018 |

=== Madhya Pradesh ===
- Najma Heptullah, who represented Madhya Pradesh, and resigned after being appointed Governor of Manipur. La Ganesan was elected in this bye-election unopposed on October 6, with the term till 2 April 2018.

| S.No | Former MP | Party | Date of Vacancy | Elected MP | Party | Date of appointment | Date of retirement |
|---|---|---|---|---|---|---|---|
| 1 | Najma Heptullah | Bharatiya Janata Party | 20 August | La Ganesan | Bharatiya Janata Party | 7 October 2016 | 2 April 2018 |
