= Jagjivan =

Jagjivan is a surname. Notable people with the name include:

- Jagjivan Prasad Babu, leader of the Samajwadi Party in Uttar Pradesh
- Jagjivan Das (1727–1761), founder of the Satnami denomination of Hinduism in Upper India
- Jagjivan Rao Pant Pratinidhi (1691–1754), Chief Delegate during Chhatrapati Shahu I reign
- Jagjivan Ram (1908–1986), aka Babuji, Indian independence activist, politician, Cabinet minister for over 30 years

== See also ==
- Indian National Congress (Jagjivan), political party in India
- Jagjivan Ram Institute of Parliamentary Studies & Political Research
