= Yagya Dutt Sharma =

Yagya Dutt Sharma, or variants, may refer to:

- Yagyadutt Sharma (novelist)
- Yagya Datt Sharma (Madhya Pradesh politician)
- Yagya Dutt Sharma (Punjab politician)
- Yagya Datt Sharma (Uttar Pradesh politician)
- Y. D. Sharma (professor)
- Yagya Dutt Sharma (trade unionist)
