= Ajit Singh =

Ajit Singh may refer to:

== Politicians and rulers ==
- Ajit Singh (politician, born 1939) (Chaudhary Ajit Singh, 1939–2021), founder of the Rashtriya Lok Dal party in Uttar Pradesh
- Ajit Singh (Bihar politician) (in office 2005–2015)
- Ajit Singh (Assam politician) (born 1960), cabinet minister in Assam, India
- Ajit Singh of Khetri (1861–1901), ruler of Khetri, Rajasthan
- Ajit Singh of Marwar (1670s–1724), Maharaja of Marwarlater Jodhpur
- Ajit Singh Kohar, cabinet minister in Punjab, India
- Ajit Kumar Singh (1962–2007), Indian politician of the Janata Dal (United) party
- Ajit Kushwaha (Ajit Kumar Singh, born 1988), Indian politician of the Communist Party of India (Marxist–Leninist) Liberation party
- Ajit Pratap Singh (1917–2000), Indian politician
- Sardar Ajit Singh (1881–1947), Indian nationalist revolutionary
- Ajit Singh (politician, died 2004) (died 2004)

== Sportspeople ==
- Nongthombam Ajit Singh (born 1993), Indian cricketer
- Ajit Singh Balla (born 1931), Indian Olympic high jumper
- Ajit Singh (racewalker) (born 1936), Indian Olympic racewalker
- Ajit Pal Singh (born 1947), Indian field hockey player
- Ajit Singh (field hockey) (born 1952), Indian field hockey player

== Other people ==
- Ajit Singh (economist) (1940–2015), Professor Emeritus of economics at Cambridge University
- Ajit Singh (police officer) (1945–1991), Indian Police Service officer
- Ajit Singh (Sikhism) (1687–1705), eldest son of Guru Gobind Singh
- Ajit Iqbal Singh (born 1943), Indian mathematician
- Ajit Swaran Singh (born 1951), judge in New Zealand
