= Third Mulayam Singh Yadav ministry =

Government of Uttar Pradesh, India (2003–07)

This is the Uttar Pradesh Council of Ministers headed by the Chief Minister of Uttar Pradesh, Mulayam Singh Yadav from 2003 to 2007.

== Council of ministers ==
=== Cabinet Ministers ===
Sr. No.	Name	Constituency	Portfolio	Party	Term of office		
Sr. No.	Name	Constituency	Portfolio	Party	Took office	Left office	Duration
1	Mulayam Singh	Gunnaur	Chief Minister; Minister of general administration, sec administration, administrative reforms, confidential, vigilance, appointment, personnel, information, election, finance, justice, industrial development, legistlative business, planning, protocol, estate, cooperative, excise, prohibition, energy, technical, secondary and higher education, medical education (except ayurvedi and homeopathic education), wildlife, rural development, surgarcane development, sugar mills, Other departments not allocated to any Minister	Samajwadi Party	29 August 2003	13 May 2007	3 years, 288 days
2	Azam Khan	Rampur	Minister of Parliamentary Affairs, Urban Development	Samajwadi Party	29 August 2003	13 May 2007	3 years, 288 days
3	Shivpal Singh Yadav	Jaswantnagar	Minister of Agriculture, Agricultural Education	Samajwadi Party	29 August 2003	13 May 2007	3 years, 288 days
4	Kusum Rai	MLC	Minister of Public Works Department	Rashtriya Kranti Party	29 August 2003	13 May 2007	3 years, 288 days
5	Anuradha Choudhary	Baghra	Minister of Irrigation	Rashtriya Lok Dal	29 August 2003	29 May-2004	305 days
6	Kaukab Hameed Khan	Baghpat	Minister of Rural Engineering Services	Rashtriya Lok Dal	29 August 2003	13 May 2007	3 years, 288 days
7	Rajveer Singh	Debai	Minister of Health and Medicine, Ayurved and Homeopathic Medicine	Rashtriya Kranti Party	29 August 2003	13 May 2007	3 years, 288 days
8	Rewati Raman Singh	Karachhana	Minister of Transport	Samajwadi Party	4 October 2003	13 May 2007	3 years, 221 days
9	Ahmad Hasan	MLC	Minister of Family Welfare	Samajwadi Party	4 October 2003	13 May 2007	3 years, 221 days
10	Bhagwati Singh	MLC	Minister of Externally Aided Projects	Samajwadi Party	4 October 2003	13 May 2007	275 days
11	Kiran Pal Singh	Agota	Minister of Basic Education	Samajwadi Party	4 October 2003	13 May 2007	3 years, 221 days
