= First Yogi Adityanath ministry =

Government of Uttar Pradesh, India (2017–22)

- 17th Ministry of Uttar Pradesh

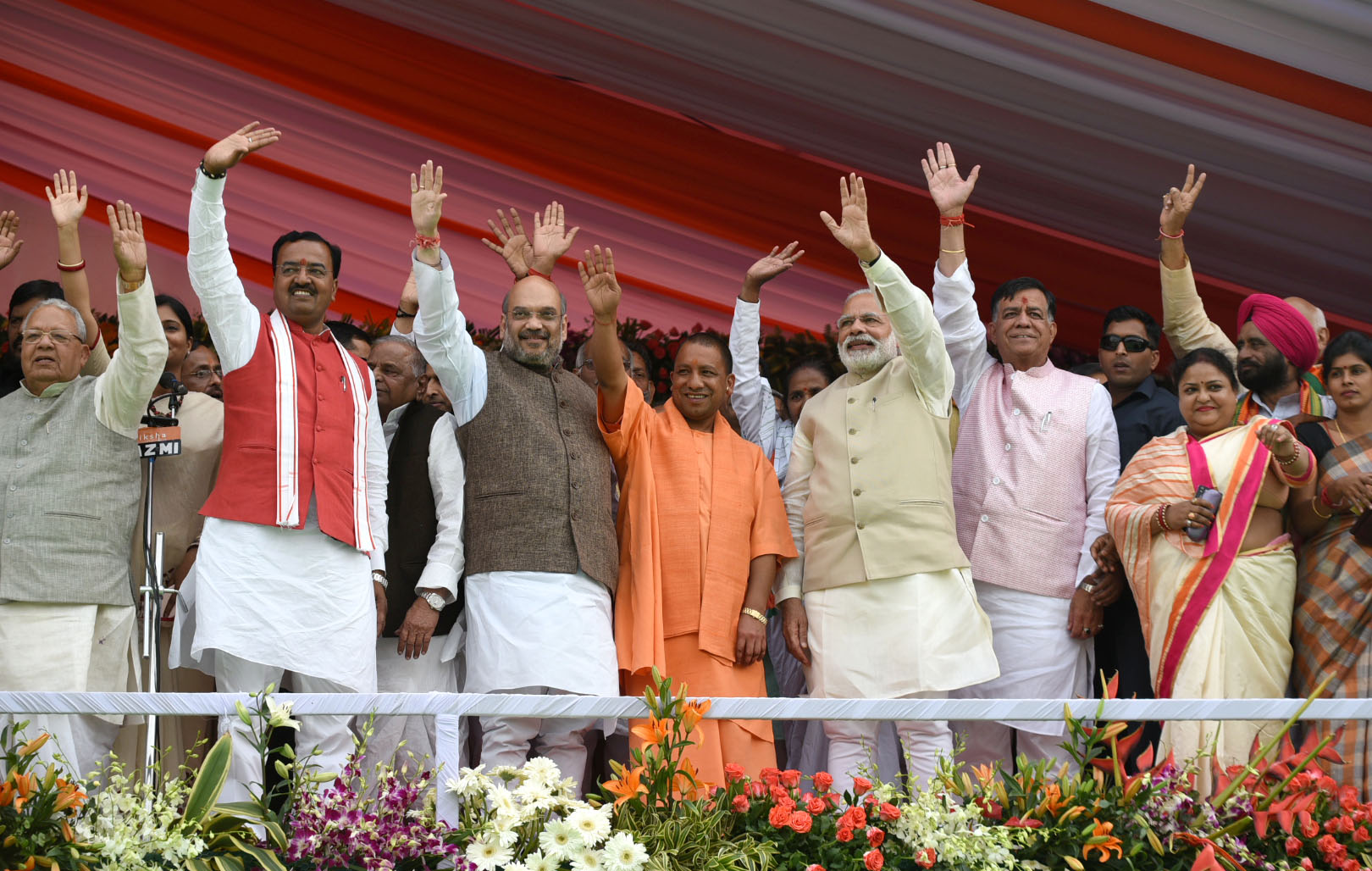
- The Chief Minister Yogi Adityanath (in centre), The Prime Minister Narendra Modi, BJP National President Amit Shah along with various Ministers of the newly formed cabinet on March 19, 2017 at Smriti Upvan, Lucknow
- Date formed: 19 March 2017
- Date dissolved: 12 March 2022

People and organisations
- Head of state: Ram Naik (until 28 July 2019); Anandiben Patel (from 29 July 2019)
- Head of government: Yogi Adityanath
- Deputy head of government: Keshav Prasad Maurya and Dr. Dinesh Sharma
- No. of ministers: 57
- Ministers removed: 15
- Total no. of members: 60
- Member parties: BJP; AD(S)
- Opposition party: SP
- Opposition leader: Ram Govind Chaudhary (Assembly)

History
- Election: 2017
- Outgoing election: 2012
- Legislature term: 5 years
- Predecessor: Akhilesh Yadav ministry
- Successor: Second Yogi Adityanath ministry

The First ministry of Yogi Adityanath is the council of ministers in 17th Uttar Pradesh Legislative Assembly headed by Chief Minister Yogi Adityanath since 19 March 2017. As per the Constitution of India, the Uttar Pradesh Council of Ministers, including the Chief Minister, can have maximum 60 members.

There were 57 Ministers Including the Chief Minister, 22 were cabinet ministers, 8 were state ministers with Independent charge and 27 were State ministers. Out of the 57 ministers, 56 were from the BJP while AD(S) was having 1 minister.

== Tenure ==
Since 2017 chief minister Adityanath had ordered the closing of many slaughterhouses. As a direct consequence, the tanneries that sourced raw leather from the slaughter houses were impacted. Several tanneries were also ordered to be shut down. The tannery industry was estimated to worth 50,0000 crore ₹ in 2017. The industry directly or indirectly gave employment to more than 10 lakh people. Since 2018, through executive orders, CM Adityanath had closed around 200 tanneries out of a total of more than 400 that were active in Jajamau, Kanpur.

== Council of Ministers ==
SI No.	Name	Constituency	Department	Party
Chief Minister
1.	Yogi Adityanath	MLC	Home.; Housing and Urban Planning.; Revenue.; Food and Civil Supplies.; Food Safety and Drug Administration.; Planning.; Economics and Statistics.; Geology and Mining.; Flood Control.; Tax Registration.; Jail.; General Administration.; Secretariat Administration.; Confidential.; Vigilance.; Appointment.; Personnel.; State Property.; Administrative Reform.; Infrastructure.; Relief and Rehabilitation.; Consumer Protection.; Departments Not Allotted To Any Minister.	BJP
Deputy Chief Ministers
3.	Dr. Dinesh Sharma	MLC	Secondary Education and Higher Education.; Science and Technology.; Electronics.; Information Technology.	BJP
2.	Keshav Prasad Maurya	MLC	Public Works Department.; Food Processing.; Entertainment Tax.; Public Enterprises.	BJP
4.	Surya Pratap Shahi	Pathardeva	Agriculture.; Agricultural Education.; Agricultural Research.	BJP
5.	Suresh Khanna	Shahjahanpur	Finance.; Parliamentary Affairs.; Medical Education.	BJP
6.	Satish Mahana	Maharajpur	Industrial Development.	BJP
7.	Ramapati Shastri	Mankapur	Social Welfare.; Scheduled Castes and Tribal Welfare.	BJP
8.	Jai Pratap Singh	Bansi	Medical and Health.; Family Welfare.; Mother and Child Welfare.	BJP
9.	Brijesh Pathak	Lucknow Central	Legislative.; Justice.; Rural Engineering Service.	BJP
10.	Chaudhary Laxmi Narayan Singh	Chhata	Dairy Development.; Animal Husbandry.; Fisheries.	BJP
11.	Shrikant Sharma	Mathura	Energy.; Additional Sources Of Energy.	BJP
12.	Rajendra Pratap Singh	Patti	Rural Development.; Overall Village Development.	BJP
13.	Sidharth Nath Singh	Allahabad West	Khadi and Villages Industries.; Sericulture Industries.; Textile.; Micro, Small and Medium Enterprise.; Export Promotion.; NRI.; Investment Promotion.	BJP
14.	Mukut Bihari Verma	Kaiserganj	Cooperative.	BJP
15.	Ashutosh Tandon	Lucknow East	Urban Development.; Urban Employment and Poverty Alleviation.	BJP
16.	Nand Gopal Gupta Nandi	Allahabad South	Civil Aviation.; Political Pension.; Minority Welfare.; Muslim Waqf and Haj.	BJP
17.	Dr. Mahendra Singh	MLC	Jal Shakti.	BJP
18.	Suresh Rana	Thana Bhawan	Sugarcane Development.; Sugar Mills.	BJP
19.	Bhupendra Singh Chaudhary	MLC	Panchayati Raj.	BJP
20.	Anil Rajbhar	Shivpur	Backward Class Welfare.; Divyangjan Empowerment.	BJP
21.	Ram Naresh Agnihotri	Bhongaon	Excise.; Prohibition.	BJP
22.	Jitin Prasada	MLC	Technical Education	BJP
Minister of State (Independent Charge)
23.	Upendra Tiwari	Phephana	Sports; Youth Welfare.; Panchayati Raj (MOS).	BJP
24.	Swati Singh	Sarojini Nagar	Women's Welfare.; Child Development & Nutrition (MOS).	BJP
25.	Neelkanth Tiwari	Varanasi South	Tourism.; Culture.; Religious Affairs.; Protocol (MOS).	BJP
26.	Kapil Dev Aggarwal	Muzaffarnagar	Vocational Education.; Skill Development.	BJP
27.	Satish Chandra Dwivedi	Itwa	Basic Education.	BJP
28.	Ashok Katariya	MLC	Transport.; Parliamentary Affairs (MOS).	BJP
29.	Sriram Chauhan	Dhanghata	Horticulture.; Agricultural Exports.; Agricultural Marketing.; Agricultural Foreign Trade.	BJP
30.	Ravindra Jaiswal	Varanasi North	Stamp and Court Fee.; Registration.	BJP
Minister of State
31.	Gulabo Devi	Chandausi	Secondary Education.	BJP
32.	Jai Prakash Nishad	Rudrapur	Animal Husbandry.; Fisheries and Dairy Development.	BJP
33.	Jai Kumar Singh Jaiki	Jahanabad	Jail.; Public Service Management.	AD(S)
34.	Atul Garg	Ghaziabad	Medical and Health.; Family Welfare.; Mother and Child Welfare.	BJP
35.	Ranvendra Pratap Singh	Husainganj	Food & Civil Supplies.	BJP
36.	Mohsin Raza	MLC	Minority Welfare.; Muslim Waqf.; Haj.	BJP
37.	Girish Chandra Yadav	Jaunpur	Housing and Urban Planning.	BJP
38.	Baldev Singh Aulakh	Bilaspur	Jal Shakti.	BJP
39.	Mannu Kori	Mehroni	Labor.; Employment.	BJP
40.	Sandeep Singh	Atrauli	Finance.; Technical Education.; Medical Education.	BJP
41.	Suresh Pasi	Jagdishpur	Sugarcane Development.; Sugar Mills.	BJP
42.	Anil Sharma	Shikarpur	Forest.; Environment.; Zoological Garden.	BJP
43.	Mahesh Chandra Gupta	Budaun	Urban Development.; Urban Employment and Poverty Alleviation.	BJP
44.	Anand Swaroop Shukla	Ballia Nagar	Parliamentary Affairs.; Rural Development.; Overall Village Development.	BJP
45.	Girraj Singh Dharmesh	Agra Cantonment	Social Welfare.; Scheduled Castes and Tribal Welfare.	BJP
46.	Lakhan Singh	Dibiyapur	Agriculture.; Agricultural Education.; Agricultural Research.	BJP
47.	Neelima Katiyar	Kalyanpur	Higher Education.; Science and Technology.	BJP
48.	Chaudhary Udaybhan Singh	Fatehpur Sikri	Khadi and Villages Industries.; Sericulture Industries.; Textile.; Micro, Small and Medium Enterprise.; Export Promotion.	BJP
49.	Chandrika Prasad Upadhyay	Chitrakoot	Public Works Department.	BJP
50.	Rama Shankar Singh	Marihan constituency	Energy.; Additional Sources of Energy.	BJP
51.	Ajit Singh Pal	Sikandra	Electronics.; Information Technology.	BJP
52.	Chhatrapal Singh Gangwar	Baheri	Revenue	BJP
53.	Sanjiv Kumar	Obra	Social Welfare; Scheduled Castes and Tribes Welfare	BJP
54.	Dinesh Khatik	Hastinapur	Flood Control	BJP
55.	Paltu Ram	Balrampur	Sainik Kalyan; Home Guards; Civil Security Department	BJP
56.	Sangeeta Balwant	Ghazipur Sadar	Cooperatives	BJP
57.	Dharmaveer Prajapati	MLC	Industrial Development	BJP

== Former Ministers ==
SI No.	Name	Constituency	Department	Tenure	Reason	Party
1.	Om Prakash Rajbhar	Zahoorabad	Backward classes welfare and Disabled people development.	March 2017 – May 2019	Removed	SBSP
2.	Rita Bahuguna Joshi	Lucknow Cantonment	Women & Family Welfare.; Maternity & Child Welfare.; Tourism.	March 2017 – May 2019	Elected to 17th Lok Sabha	BJP
3.	S.P. Singh Baghel	Tundla	Livestock.; Minor Irrigation and Fisheries.	March 2017 – May 2019	Elected to 17th Lok Sabha	BJP
4.	Satyadev Pachauri	Govind Nagar	Khadi.; Rural industry.; Resham.; Textile industry.; Small & Medium enterprises and Exports encouragements.	March 2017 – May 2019	Elected to 17th Lok Sabha	BJP
5.	Rajesh Agarwal	Bareilly Cantonment	Finance.	March 2017 – August 2019	Resigned	BJP
6.	Dharmpal Singh	Aonla	Irrigation.	March 2017 – August 2019	Resigned	BJP
7.	Archana Pandey	Chhibramau	Mining (MOS).; Excise and Prohibition (MOS).	March 2017 – August 2019	Resigned	BJP
8.	Anupama Jaiswal	Bahraich	Basic education (I/C).; Child development and nutrition (MOS).; Revenue (MOS).; Finance (MOS).	March 2017 – August 2019	Resigned	BJP
9.	Swatantra Dev Singh	MLC	Transport (I/C).; Protocol (MOS).; Power (MOS).	March 2017 – August 2019	Resigned. Made UP BJP chief.	BJP
10.	Kamal Rani Varun	Ghatampur	Technical Education.	August 2019 – August 2020	Died	BJP
11.	Chetan Chauhan	Naugawan Sadat	Sainik Welfare.; Home Guards.; PRD.; Civil Security.	March 2017 – August 2020	Died	BJP
12.	Vijay Kumar Kashyap	Charthawal	Revenue (MOS).; Flood Control (MOS).	March 2017 – May 2021	Died	BJP
13.	Swami Prasad Maurya	Padrauna	Labour.; Employment.; Coordination.	March 2017 – January 2022	Resigned	BJP
14.	Dara Singh Chauhan	Madhuban	Forest.; Environment.; Zoological Garden.	March 2017 – January 2022	Resigned	BJP
15.	Dharam Singh Saini	Nakur	Ayush.; Food Security and Drug Administration (MOS).	March 2017 – January 2022	Resigned	BJP

== See also ==
- Uttar Pradesh Legislative Assembly
- Uttar Pradesh Legislative Council
