= Chandel (surname) =

Chandel is an Indian surname. Notable people with the surname include:

- Narayan Chandel (born 1965), Indian politician
- Suresh Chandel (born 1960), Indian politician
- Ashok Kumar Singh Chandel, Indian politician
- Pushpendra Singh Chandel, Indian politician
- Raj Bahadur Singh Chandel, Indian politician
