= Mahendra Kumar Singh =

Indian politician

Minister of Jal Shakti Government of Uttar Pradesh
- In office 22 August 2019 – 25 March 2022
- Chief Minister: Yogi Adityanath
- Preceded by: Dharmpal Singh
- Succeeded by: Swatantra Dev Singh

Minister of Rural Development Government of Uttar Pradesh
- In office 19 March 2017 – 22 August 2019
- Chief Minister: Yogi Adityanath
- Succeeded by: Rajendra Pratap Singh

Member of Uttar Pradesh Legislative Council
- Incumbent
- Assumed office 6 May 2012
- Preceded by: Ashok Dhawan
- Constituency: elected by Legislative Assembly member's

Personal details
- Born: 16 May 1967 (age 58) Pratapgarh, Uttar Pradesh, India
- Party: Bharatiya Janata Party
- Spouse: Gita Singh
- Children: 2

Dr. Mahendra Kumar Singh (born 15 March 1967) is a senior leader of Bhartiya Janata Party and serving his 3rd term as Member of Uttar Pradesh Legislative Council since 2012. He previously served as Cabinet Minister in first Yogi Cabinet.

== Early life ==
Mahendra Singh was born to Late Ramdas Singh in a peasant family in Pratapgarh, Uttar Pradesh. He is a former professor from a college.

== Political career ==
He was national secretary of BJP and former Prabhari of Assam BJP. He is credited with the huge success of BJP in Assam Legislative Assembly election in 2016. He was Cabinet Minister of Ministry of Jal Shakti of the Government of Uttar Pradesh. Before 22 August 2019 he served as Minister of State (Independent Charge) of Gramya Vikas, Samagra Gramya Vikas and MOS of health departments but after winning 12 continuous rewards from Government of India in different departments including Pradhan Mantri Awas Yojana & Online Transparent Transfer Mechanism for Gram Vikas Department Employee (Developed In-house by UPSRLM, Dept. of Gram Vikas), he was promoted to Cabinet Minister. Dr. Singh also started online transparent posting for newly joined AE's in Irrigation and Minor Irrigation Department. In 2024, came Singh's appointment as BJP Madhya Pradesh Prabhari.
