= Ashok Katariya =

Indian politician

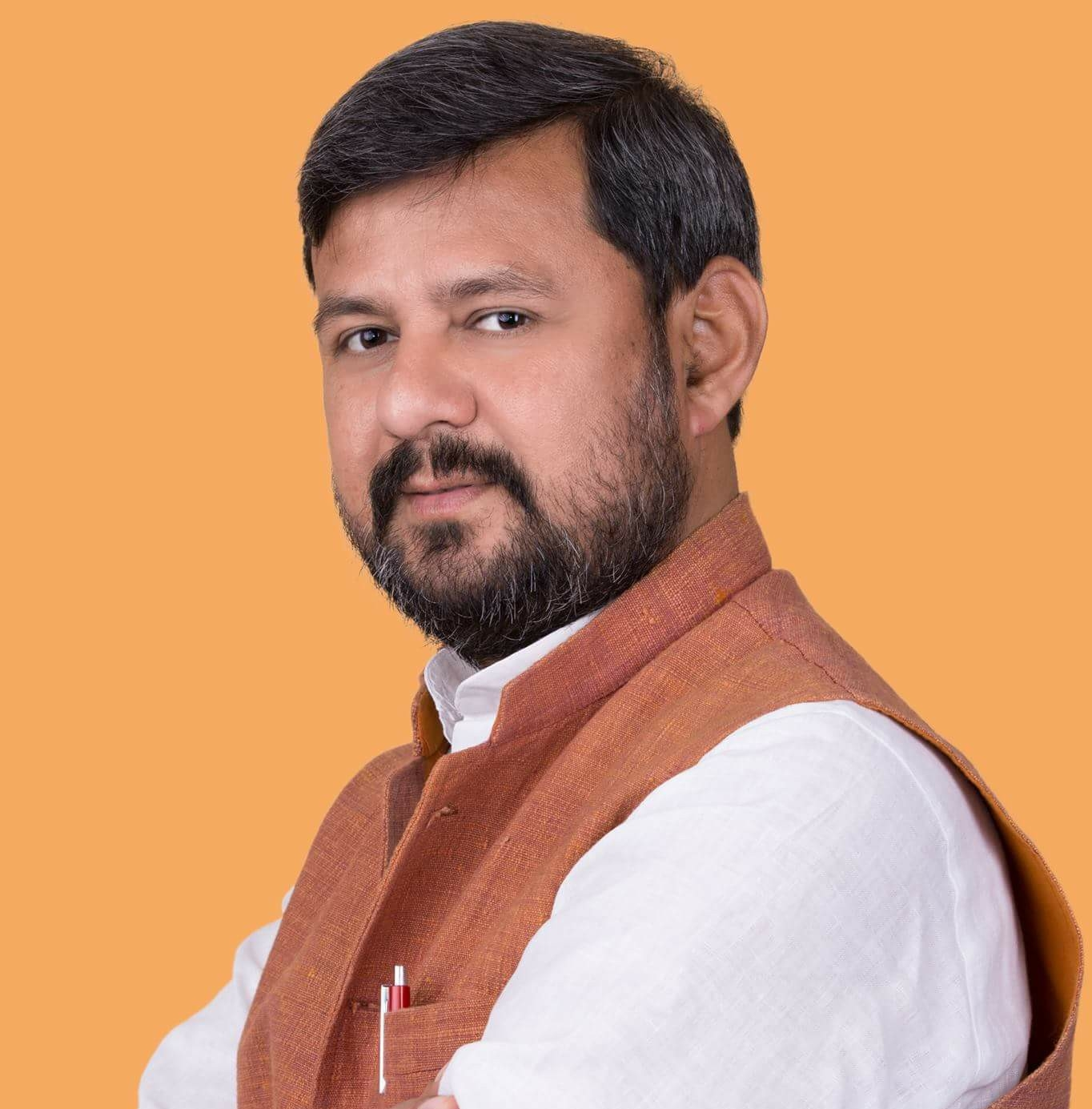

Minister of Transport Government of Uttar Pradesh
- In office 21 August 2019 – 28 March 2022
- Chief Minister: Yogi Adityanath
- Preceded by: Swatantra Dev Singh
- Succeeded by: Daya Shankar Singh

Member of Uttar Pradesh Legislative Council
- Incumbent
- Assumed office 6 May 2018
- Constituency: elected by Legislative Assembly members

Personal details
- Born: 18 December 1972 (age 53) Bijnor, Uttar Pradesh, India
- Party: Bharatiya Janata Party
- Children: 1 son and 1 daughter
- Profession: Politician
- Website: www.ashokkatariya.info

Ashok Katariya is an Indian politician from the state of Uttar Pradesh and member of Uttar Pradesh Legislative Council and he has served as Transport Minister with Independent Charge and Minister of State for Parliamentary Affairs in the Government of Uttar Pradesh till March 2022.

== Political career ==
He was from the start a notable leader of Gurjar community. Katariya's political journey began with the Akhil Bharatiya Vidyarthi Parishad. Katariya was the organisational secretary of ABVP Moradabad Vibhag in 1994. In 1996, he was given responsibilities of Meerut Vibhag after that State secretary of Bharatiya Janata Yuva Morcha in 2001. In 2004, Katariya was selected as President of BJYM Uttar Pradesh. In 2007 he was selected State secretary of BJP U.P. and served for consecutive terms till 2013. In 2013 he was given the responsibility of State vice president of BJP U.P. During the 2014 General elections, he was appointed Star campaigner of BJP in U.P. In 2016 he was given responsibility of General Secretary of BJP U.P. till 2020.

He has been appointed Transport Minister of State (Independent Charge) & Parliamentary Affairs Minister of State in Yogi Adityanath ministry on 21 August 2019.
