= Allahabad–Jhansi Graduates constituency =

Uttar Pradesh legislative council seat

Allahabad–Jhansi Graduates constituency is one of 100 Legislative Council seats in Uttar Pradesh. The districts of Prayagraj, Jhansi, Fatehpur, Hamirpur, Jalaun, Kaushambi, Banda, Lalitpur, Chitrakoot and Mahoba fall within the legislature of this constituency. Dr Man Singh Yadav of the Samajwadi Party is the incumbent MLC in the Uttar Pradesh Legislative Council.

== Members of the Legislative Council ==
Year	Name	Party
1996	Dr. Yagya Datt Sharma	Bharatiya Janata Party
2002	Dr. Yagya Datt Sharma	Bharatiya Janata Party
2008	Dr. Yagya Datt Sharma	Bharatiya Janata Party
2014	Dr. Yagya Datt Sharma	Bharatiya Janata Party
2020	Dr. Man Singh Yadav	Samajwadi Party
2026	Dr. Man Singh Yadav	Samajwadi Party

== See also ==
- Allahabad (Lok Sabha constituency)
- Jhansi Nagar (Assembly constituency)
- Jhansi (Lok Sabha constituency)
