= Meerut Teachers constituency =

Legislative Council constituency in Uttar Pradesh

Meerut Teachers constituency is one of 100 Legislative Council seats in Uttar Pradesh. This constituency comes under Bulandshahar, Ghaziabad, Gautambuddhnagar, Bagpat, Meerut, Muzaffarnagar and Saharanpur districts.

== Members of the Legislative Council ==
Year	Name	Party
1974	Om Prakash Sharma (Teacher)	Independent
1980	Om Prakash Sharma (Teacher)	Independent
1986	Om Prakash Sharma (Teacher)	Independent
1992	Om Prakash Sharma (Teacher)	Independent
1998	Om Prakash Sharma (Teacher)	Independent
2004	Om Prakash Sharma (Teacher)	Independent
2010	Om Prakash Sharma (Teacher)	Independent
2014	Om Prakash Sharma (Teacher)	Independent
2020	Shrichand Sharma	Bharatiya Janata Party
2026	Shrichand Sharma	Bharatiya Janata Party

== Term of tenure ==
Retirement after 6 years.

== Political Party View ==
Non political party view

== See also ==
- Meerut (Assembly constituency)
- Meerut (Lok Sabha constituency)
