= Khwaja Haleem =

Indian politician

Member of Legislative Assembly
- In office 1980–1985
- Succeeded by: Baldev Singh
- Constituency: Aligarh

Personal details
- Born: 28 July 1944
- Died: 15 February 2018 (aged 73) Delhi
- Party: Samajwadi Party
- Education: Aligarh Muslim University

Khwaja Haleem (28 July 1944 – 15 February 2018) was an Indian politician.

== Early life and education ==
Khwaja Haleem was born into a prominent family. His uncle, Jamal Khwaja was a Member of Parliament. He completed his master's degree from the Aligarh Muslim University in 1969.

== Career ==
He started his career with the Indian Youth Congress. He joined the Lok Dal and was elected as a Member of Legislative Assembly in 1980 from Aligarh. He was a founding member of Samajwadi party.

In 1994, he was appointed a Member of Legislative Council. In 2012, he was expelled from the Samajwadi party.

== Death ==
He suffered a heart attack and was admitted to the Jawaharlal Nehru Hospital. He was later shifted to a hospital in Delhi, where he died. He was buried at the cemetery in Shah Jamal.

== Personal life ==
He was married to Khwaja Nasreen, the daughter of Barkatullah Khan. The couple had two daughters and a son.
