= Satyapal Singh Saini =

Indian politician

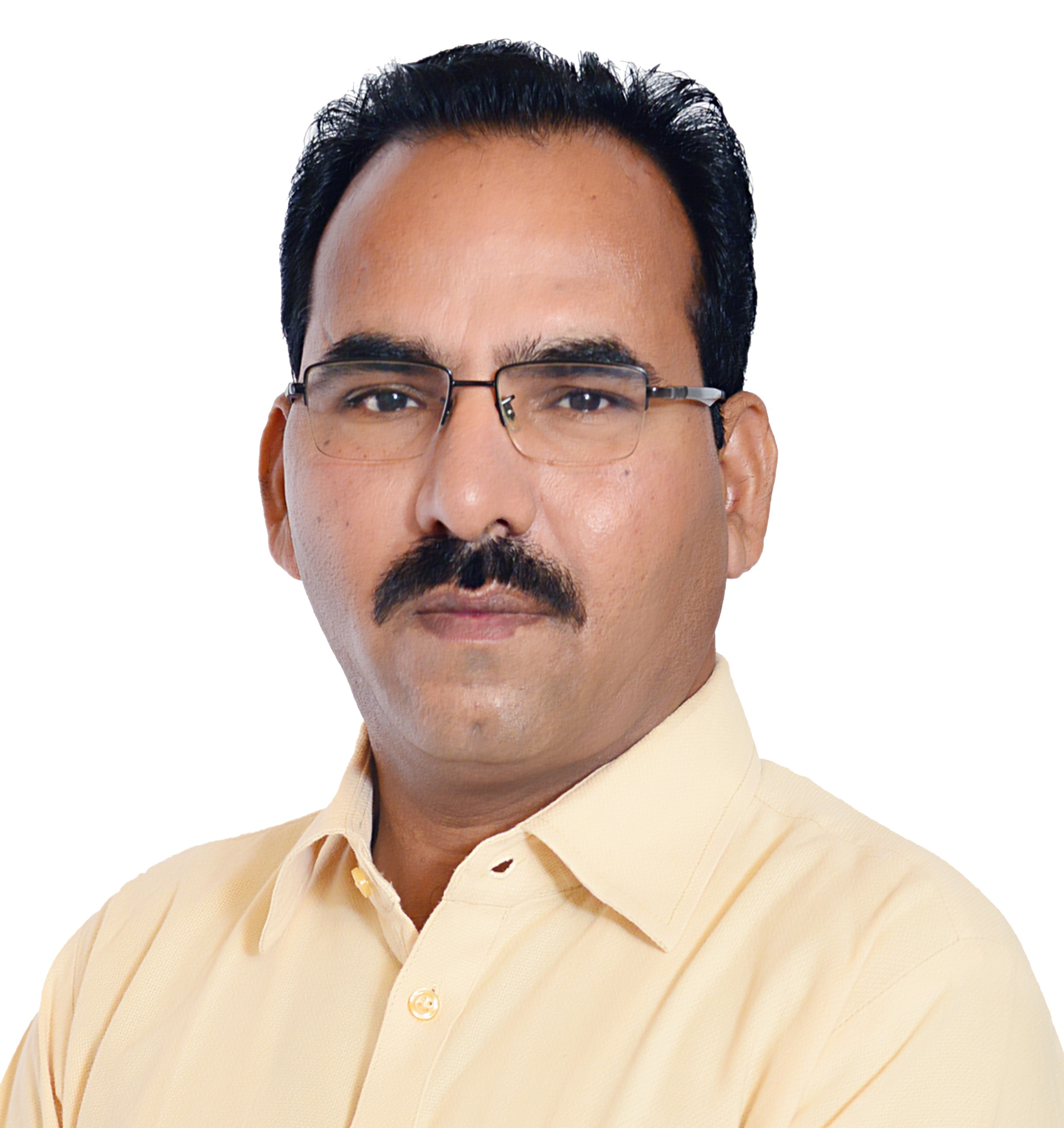

Member of Uttar Pradesh Legislative Council
- Incumbent
- Assumed office 12 April 2022
- Preceded by: Parvez Ali
- Constituency: Moradabad-Bijnor Local Authorities

Member of Parliament, Lok Sabha
- In office 2014–2019
- Preceded by: Shafiqur Rahman Barq
- Succeeded by: Shafiqur Rahman Barq
- Constituency: Sambhal

Personal details
- Born: 5 July 1973 (age 52) Pakbara, Moradabad, Uttar Pradesh
- Party: Bharatiya Janata Party
- Spouse: Asha (m. 1999)
- Children: 2 sons, 2 daughters
- Parents: Tekchand Saini (father); Rampiyari (mother)
- Education: Master of Commerce; Bachelor of Laws
- Alma mater: Kedar Nath Girdharilal Khatri PG College Moradabad
- Profession: Advocate, Politician

Satyapal Singh Saini is a member of the Bharatiya Janata Party and has won the 2014 Indian general elections from the Sambhal (Lok Sabha constituency). In 2020 he became the BJP Vice President of Uttar Pradesh and Member of the Legislative Council (MLC) from Moradabad - Bijnor in 2022.
