= Awanish Kumar Singh =

Indian politician

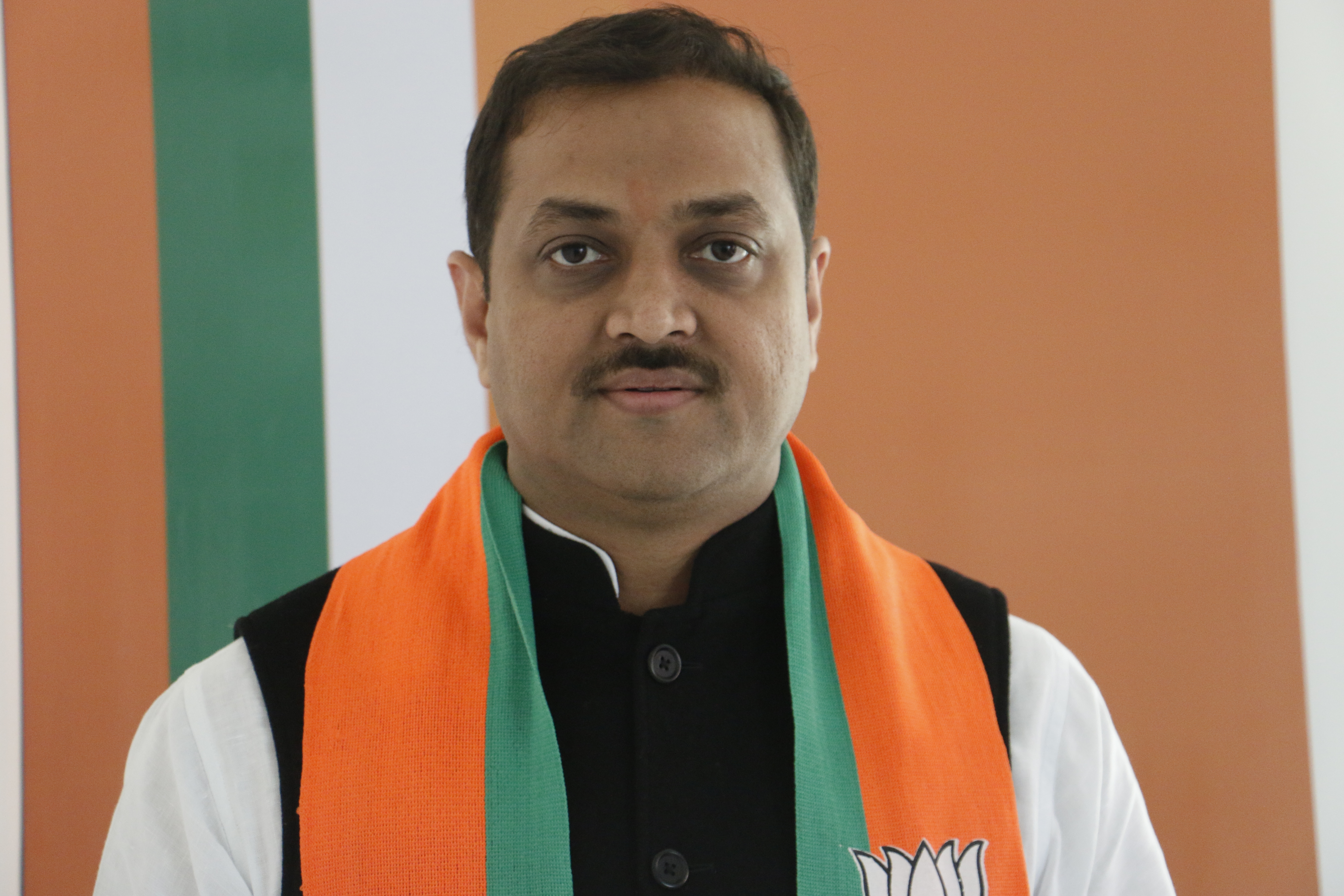

Member of Uttar Pradesh Legislative Council
- Incumbent
- Assumed office 01 Dec 2020
- Preceded by: Kanti Singh
- Constituency: Lucknow (Graduates constituency)

Personal details
- Born: Terwa Dahigawan, Hardoi, Uttar Pradesh
- Party: Bharatiya Janata Party
- Occupation: Politician
- Website: http://www.awanish.in

Awanish Kumar Singh is an Indian politician from Uttar Pradesh and a member of the Uttar Pradesh Legislative Council. He represents the Lucknow Graduates constituency and is a member of the Bharatiya Janata Party. He was elected to the Legislative Council in the 2020 Uttar Pradesh Legislative Council election. His term began on 1 December 2020.

== Early life and education ==
Awanish Kumar Singh is the son of Lal Singh. He was born in Terwa Dahigwan in Hardoi district, Uttar Pradesh. The official Uttar Pradesh Legislative Council directory lists Terwa Dahigwan, Sandila tehsil, Hardoi district, as his permanent address.

According to his election affidavit, Singh obtained a Bachelor of Technology degree in Electrical Engineering from the Faculty of Engineering and Technology at Mahatma Jyotiba Phule Rohilkhand University, Bareilly, in 2000. He subsequently obtained an Executive Management Certificate from Indian Institute of Management Calcutta in 2007. His profession was declared as business.

== Political career ==
Singh is associated with the Bharatiya Janata Party. Before being elected to the Uttar Pradesh Legislative Council, he was involved in the party's organisational activities in Uttar Pradesh. Contemporary reports identified him as the BJP candidate for the Lucknow Division Graduates constituency in the 2020 Legislative Council election.

== Member of the Uttar Pradesh Legislative Council ==
Singh was elected from the Lucknow Division Graduates constituency in the 2020 Uttar Pradesh Legislative Council election. The constituency is a graduates' constituency of the Uttar Pradesh Legislative Council.

In the election, Singh received 39,588 votes and defeated independent candidate Kanti Singh, who received 33,185 votes. He was declared elected after the counting of preferential votes. The reported margin between the two candidates was 6,403 votes.

The Association for Democratic Reforms' archive of election affidavits records Singh's Legislative Council term as 1 December 2020 to 30 November 2026.

The Uttar Pradesh Legislative Council's official directory lists him as an elected member from the Graduate constituency and identifies him as a BJP member.

== 2020 election ==
The 2020 election was held for several graduate and teachers' constituencies of the Uttar Pradesh Legislative Council. In the Lucknow Division Graduates constituency, Singh was the BJP candidate. He defeated sitting MLC Kanti Singh after preferential-vote counting.

== 2026 Legislative Council election ==
In May 2026, the Bharatiya Janata Party announced Singh as its candidate from the Lucknow Graduates constituency for the 2026 Uttar Pradesh Legislative Council election. The party repeated Singh as its candidate for the constituency.

The BJP's candidate list was also reported by the Press Trust of India.

== Personal and professional information ==
Singh's 2020 election affidavit lists his profession as business. The affidavit records his educational qualifications as a Bachelor of Technology in Electrical Engineering and an Executive Management Certificate from IIM Calcutta. The affidavit also states that no criminal cases were declared by him at the time of filing the nomination.

== See also ==
- Uttar Pradesh Legislative Council
- Bharatiya Janata Party
- List of members of the Uttar Pradesh Legislative Council
- Legislative Council of Uttar Pradesh elections
