= Sarojini Agarwal =

Indian politician

Personal details
- Party: BJP (2017- )
- Other political affiliations: Samajwadi Party (till 2017)
- Education: Lady Hardinge Medical College; Jawaharlal Nehru Medical College, Aligarh

Sarojini Agarwal is a member of BJP and no longer member of any house.

In 2017, Sarojini Agarwal resigned Samajwadi Party and joined BJP. She vacated her seat for Yogi Adityanath to become an MLC (which she was till 2024) after he was chosen as the Chief Minister of Uttar Pradesh. In the elections on 23 March, BJP won 11 out of 13 seats and the remaining two were won by Samajwadi Party and Bahujan Samaj Party each.
