= Manvendra Pratap Singh =

Indian politician from Uttar Pradesh (born 1972)

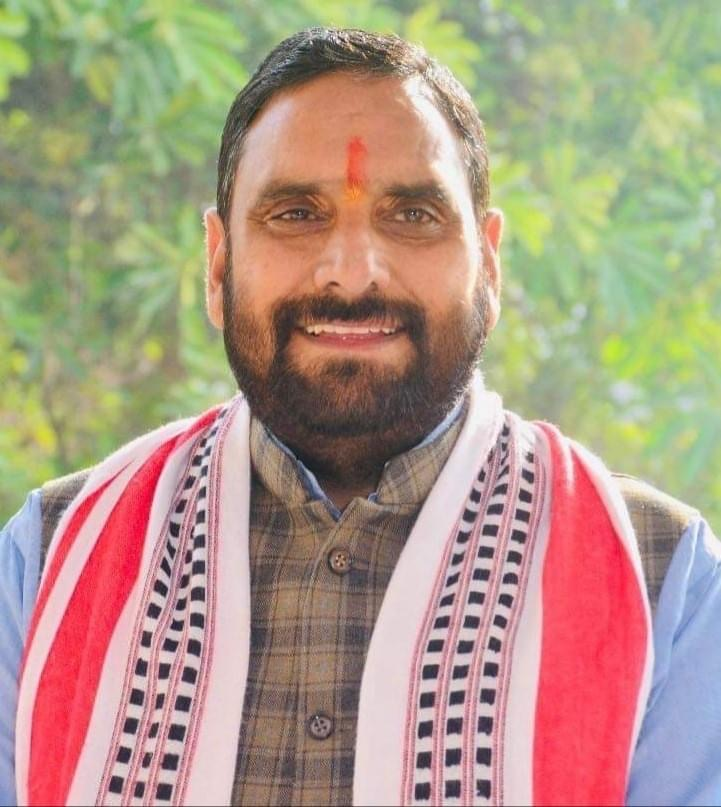
- Manvendra in 2020

Member of Uttar Pradesh Legislative Council
- Incumbent
- Assumed office 5 December 2020
- Preceded by: Aseem Yadav
- Constituency: Agra (Graduates constituency)

Personal details
- Born: 21 February 1972 (age 54) Aligarh, Uttar Pradesh, India
- Party: Bharatiya Janata Party
- Spouse: Smt. Anita Singh
- Parent(s): Thakur Rajveer Singh Yaduwanshi (Father); Smt. Ramwati Devi (Mother)
- Education: Ph.D. from History, Master of Arts (M.A) from English and History and Bachelor of Education (B.Ed.)
- Alma mater: Dr. Bhimrao Ambedkar University
- Occupation: Teacher
- Source: [[[Uttar Pradesh Legislative Council]]]

Manvendra Pratap Singh is an Indian politician from the Bharatiya Janata Party and is currently serving as a Member of Legislative Council (MLC) from Agra Graduates constituency, Uttar Pradesh.

== Early life and education ==
Manvendra was born on 21 February 1972 in Daudpur village of Aligarh, Uttar Pradesh. He was the third-born in the family, among three brothers and one sister. He completed his postgraduate studies and earned a PhD in History from Dr. Bhimrao Ambedkar University, Agra.

== Early political career ==
Manvendra began his public life as a swayamsevak of the Rashtriya Swayamsevak Sangh (RSS) at an early age. He began his political career in 1992 with the Akhil Bharatiya Vidyarthi Parishad (ABVP), where he remained active for several years and was appointed unopposed as the State President of Western Uttar Pradesh.

He became associated with the Bharatiya Janata Party (BJP) in 1995. In 2013, he was appointed coordinator of the BJP Teachers' Cell in Uttar Pradesh, followed by his appointment as a State Executive Member in 2016. In 2018, he was appointed Vice President of the BJP's Braj Kshetra unit in Uttar Pradesh. In 2020, he was nominated as the BJP candidate for the Uttar Pradesh Legislative Council elections from the Agra (Graduates constituency).

== Positions held ==
- Vice President of Braj Kshetra, Bharatiya Janata Party, Uttar Pradesh
- Member of National Monitoring Committee for Minorities Education (NMCME), Ministry of Education, Government of India.
- State President of ABVP, Western Uttar Pradesh

== See also ==
- Agra (Graduates constituency)
