= Lucknow Graduates constituency =

Constituency of Uttar Pradesh Legislative Council, India

Lucknow Graduates constituency is one of 100 Legislative Council seats in Uttar Pradesh. This constituency covers Lucknow, Barabanki, Hardoi, Rae Bareli, Pratapgarh, Sitapur and Lakhimpur Kheri districts.

== Members of the Legislative Council ==
Election	Name	Party
2002	Shiv Pal Singh	Independent
2008	Shiv Pal Singh	Independent
2014	Kanti Singh	Independent
2020	Awanish Kumar Singh	Bharatiya Janata Party
2026	Kanti Singh	Samajwadi Party

== See also ==
- Lucknow Cantonment (Assembly constituency)
- Lucknow (Lok Sabha constituency)
