= Ashok Siddharth =

Indian politician

Ashok Sidharth

Member of Parliament, Rajya Sabha
- In office 5 July 2016 – 5 July 2022
- Preceded by: Narendra Kumar Kashyap
- Succeeded by: Javed Ali Khan
- Constituency: Uttar Pradesh

Member of Uttar Pradesh Legislative Council
- In office 2009–2015
- Preceded by: Swami Prasad Maurya
- Succeeded by: Dharamveer Singh Ashok
- Constituency: elected by Legislative Assembly members

Personal details
- Party: BSP
- Children: Pragya Siddharth
- Education: Bundelkhand University (MA); Maharani Laxmi Bai Medical College (Diploma in Ophthalmic)
- Profession: Politician

Ashok Sidharth is an Indian politician and a member of the upper house Rajya Sabha in India. Sidharth is a member of the Bahujan Samaj Party political party and was elected in the elections held in June 2016 Uttar Pradesh.He was appointed the In-Charge of Andhra Pradesh on 11-06-2018.
