= Ram Sundar Das Nishad =

Indian politician

Balram Yadav

Member(elect) of Uttar Pradesh Legislative Council
- Incumbent
- Assumed office 6 July 2016
- Preceded by: himself

Personal details
- Party: Samajwadi Party
- Children: Arvind Kumar Sahani
- Occupation: Politician
- Profession: MLC advocate

Ram Sundar Das Nishad is a leader of the Samajwadi Party in Uttar Pradesh. On 10 June 2016, he was re-elected to the Uttar Pradesh Legislative Council.
