= Agra Graduates constituency =

Uttar Pradesh, India legislative council seat

Agar Graduates constituency is one of the 8 graduates seats and one of 100 Legislative Council seats in Uttar Pradesh. This constituency covers Agra, Aligarh, Mathura, Firozabad, Hathras, Etah, Mainpuri, Etawah, Kannauj, Auraiya, Kasganj and Farrukhabad districts.

== Members of the Legislative Council ==
Year	Name	Party
1996	Harnath Singh Yadav	Independent
2002	Harnath Singh Yadav	Samajwadi Party
2008	Vivek Bansal	Indian National Congress
2014	Dr. Aseem Yadav	Samajwadi Party
2020	Dr. Manvendra Pratap Singh	Bharatiya Janata Party
2026	Dr. Manvendra Pratap Singh	Bharatiya Janata Party

== See also ==
- Uttar Pradesh Legislative Council
