= Kanpur Teachers constituency =

Kanpur Teachers constituency is one of 100 Legislative Council seats in Uttar Pradesh. This constituency comes under Kanpur Nagar, Kanpur Dehat and Unnao district.

== Members of the Legislative Council ==
Year	Name	Party
1962	Raja Ram Pande (Teacher)	
1974	Mool Krishna Chaturvedi (Teacher)	
1980	Har Prasad Tiwari (Teacher)	
1986	Chandra Bhushan Tripathi (Teacher)	
1992	Raj Bahadur Singh Chandel (Teacher)	Independent
1998	Raj Bahadur Singh Chandel (Teacher)	Independent
2004	Raj Bahadur Singh Chandel (Teacher)	Independent
2010	Raj Bahadur Singh Chandel (Teacher)	Independent
2017	Raj Bahadur Singh Chandel (Teacher)	Independent
2023	Raj Bahadur Singh Chandel (Teacher)	Independent

== Term of tenure ==
Retirement after 6 years.

== Party View ==
Non Political party view

== Election ==
Next election is proposed in October -November 2029

== See also ==
- Kanpur (Graduates constituency)
- Kanpur Cantonment (Assembly constituency)
- Kanpur (Lok Sabha constituency)
