= Ram Chandra Singh Pradhan =

Indian Politician

Member of Uttar Pradesh Legislative Council
- Incumbent
- Assumed office 13 April 2022
- Preceded by: Sunil Singh Yadav
- Constituency: Lucknow Unnao Local Authorities
- In office 26 May 2009 – 25 May 2015
- Constituency: Nominated

Personal details
- Born: 10 November 1967 (age 58) Lucknow, Uttar Pradesh, India
- Party: Bharatiya Janata Party
- Profession: Politician

Ram Chandra Singh Pradhan (born 10 November 1967) is an Indian politician and a member of Legislative Council, Uttar Pradesh of India. Pradhan was elected as Member of Legislative Council from Lucknow-Unnao seat in 2022.

== Early life and education ==
Ram Chandra Pradhan was born in Bhagwati Prasad Singh's house on 10 November 1967 in the Gram Sabha Dhanewa of the Lucknow district. His father was a farmer by profession. He completed his primary education at the village government school. Afterwards, he enrolled in Lucknow University to complete his graduation in Bachelor of Arts. Due to his early interest in politics, he entered into student politics and contested the election of General Secretary in 1986 and won by a large margin of votes.

After graduating he made his debut in politics. From 1999 to 2003 he was the district president of Bahujan Samaj Party from the Lucknow district.

He was the mandal coordinator of Bahujan Samaj Party from 2003 to 2012, and was in charge of Bundelkhand from 2003 to 2008. Also, he has been the chairman of PCF from 2009 to 2012.
