= Atar Singh Rao =

Indian politician

Member(elect) of Uttar Pradesh Legislative Council
- In office 7 July 2016 – 6 July 2022
- Preceded by: Lalchand Nishad, BSP

Personal details
- Born: 5 July 1967 (age 59) Meerut
- Party: BSP
- Education: Law Graduate from Chaudhary Charan University (formerly Meerut University) Meerut, in 1997. Pursuing LLM.
- Occupation: Politician, Lawyer
- Profession: Politician, Social Worker and Lawyer

Atar Singh Rao is a leader of the Bahujan Samaj Party in Uttar Pradesh.

On 10 June 2016, he was elected to the Uttar Pradesh Legislative Council.
