= Varanasi Graduates constituency =

Uttar Pradesh legislative council seat

Coordinates: 25.3270°N 82.9860°E

Varanasi Graduates constituency is one of a hundred Legislative Council seats in Uttar Pradesh. This constituency covers Varanasi, Mirzapur, Ghazipur, Ballia, Chandauli, Bhadohi and Sonbhadra districts.

== Members of the Legislative Council ==
Year	Name	Party
1996	Dr. Rajesh Kumar Mishra	Indian National Congress
2002	Dr. Rajesh Kumar Mishra	Indian National Congress
2004*	Kedar Nath Singh	Bharatiya Janata Party
2008	Kedar Nath Singh	Bharatiya Janata Party
2014	Kedar Nath Singh	Bharatiya Janata Party
2020	Ashutosh Sinha	Samajwadi Party
2026	Ashutosh Sinha	Samajwadi Party

- *By Election in 2004.

== See also ==
- Varanasi Cantonment (Assembly constituency)
- Varanasi (Lok Sabha constituency)
