= Rannvijay Singh Gonda =

Indian politician

Member of Uttar Pradesh Legislative Council
- In office 2016–2022

Personal details
- Party: SP
- Occupation: Politician

Rannvijay Singh Gonda is a leader of the Samajwadi Party in Uttar Pradesh. On 10 June 2016, he was elected to the Uttar Pradesh Legislative Council.

== Early life and education ==
Rannvijay Singh was born to Prithvi pal. He is a post graduate of the Kul Bhashkar Ashram College Allahabad under Kanpur University, Kanpur.
