= Rajesh Kumar Mishra (born 1950) =

Indian politician

Member of Parliament, Lok Sabha
- In office 17 May 2004 – 18 May 2009
- Preceded by: Shankar Prasad Jaiswal
- Succeeded by: Murli Manohar Joshi
- Constituency: Varanasi

Member of Uttar Pradesh Legislative Council
- In office 06 May 1996 – 26 May 2004
- Succeeded by: Kedar Nath Singh
- Constituency: Varanasi Graduates

Personal details
- Born: July 7, 1965 (age 61) Kasili, District Deoria; Uttar Pradesh
- Party: Bharatiya Janata Party (2024-)
- Other political affiliations: Indian National Congress (1982-2024)
- Spouse: Smt.Madhu Mishra (m.1983)
- Children: 2 (sons)
- Education: M.A, PhD; Banaras Hindu University
- Profession: Agriculturist

Rajesh Kumar Mishra is an Indian politician. Previously he served as Member in 14th Lok Sabha from Varanasi Lok Sabha, and a former member of Uttar Pradesh Legislative Council from Varanasi Graduates.

== Political career ==
He served as a member of the 14th Lok Sabha from Varanasi as a member of INC.He also served as Member of Uttar Pradesh Legislative Council as a INC from Varanasi Graduates for two consecutive terms. He was also a candidate for 2022 Uttar Pradesh Legislative Assembly election in the seat of Varansi Cantonment. He joined BJP in 2024.

== Personal life ==
He was born on 7 July 1965, in Deoria, Uttar Pradesh, and married Madhu Mishra in 1983.
