= Ram Kumar Verma =

Indian politician

MP of Rajya Sabha for Rajasthan
- In office 5 July 2016 – 4 July 2022
- Preceded by: V.P.Singh Badnore, BJP
- Constituency: Rajasthan

Personal details
- Party: Bharatiya Janata Party
- Profession: Politician

Ram Kumar Verma was the Rajya Sabha member for Rajasthan, he is a retired Reserve Bank of India official. He secured 40 votes and won the seat.
