= Sukhram Singh Yadav =

Indian politician

Ch. Sukhram Singh Yadav चौधरी सुखराम सिंह यादव

Member of Parliament, Rajya Sabha
- In office 5 July 2016 – July 2022
- Preceded by: Rajpal Singh Saini, BSP
- Constituency: Uttar Pradesh

Chairman, Uttar Pradesh Legislative Council
- In office 3 August 2004 – 15 January 2010
- Preceded by: Nityanand Swami
- Succeeded by: Ganesh Shankar Pandey

Minister of State for Public Works Department and Parliamentary Affairs, Government of Uttar Pradesh
- In office 4 December 1993 – 3 June 1995

Personal details
- Born: 2 January 1952 Vill. Meharban Singh Ka Purwa, Dist. Kanpur Nagar.
- Party: Samajwadi Party
- Spouse: Neeta Singh (m. 1980)
- Children: Son- Mohit Yadav Daughter in law- Shrutika Yadav Daughter- Shruti Yadav Daughter- Dr Megha Singh
- Parent(s): Ch. Harmohan Yadav; Gaya Kumari
- Education: University of Lucknow

Chaudhary Sukhram Singh Yadav is an Indian politician. He was the Chairman of the Uttar Pradesh Legislative Council from 2004 to 2010.
