= Jagjivan Ram Institute of Parliamentary Studies & Political Research =

Indian educational institute

Coordinates: 25.60162°N 85.11966°E

Jagjivan Ram Institute of Parliamentary Studies & Political Research is a nationally acclaimed educational institute in Bihar. It conducts study, research and training on a wide range of topics related to society, politics, constitution and parliament. It is situated at 10, Sardar Patel Marg, near Bihar Legislative Assembly . Dr. Narendra Pathak, a senior writer and researcher, is the director of the institute.

== History ==
The institute was started in 1977 by the then Chief Minister of Bihar, Karpoori Thakur. It was named after the famous politician and statesman, Babu Jagjivan Ram who was the Deputy Prime Minister of India at that time. In 1986 the institute was taken over by the Government of Bihar. The institute has been revamped in the recent years under Chief Minister, Bihar Nitish Kumar who has provided special assistance and guidance.

== Vision ==
The aim of the institute is to provide infrastructure, resources and facilities to the students as well as to the lawmakers to explore and understand the constitutional and parliamentary processes and their outcomes.Nitish Kumar expects the institute to facilitate more research on how democracies and parliamentary systems function globally. He wants the institute to have special focus on the role of Bihar in India's Freedom struggle.

== Activities ==
The institute promotes parliamentary studies and political research through a series of national and international level seminars, workshops and lectures in which several well-known scholars are invited to participate and give their presentations. It publishes an internationally acclaimed quarterly research journal titled 'Democracy'.
