= Aizaz Rizvi =

Indian politician

Aizaz Rizvi was a leader of Bharatiya Janata Party from Uttar Pradesh. He was a member of Uttar Pradesh Legislative Council. Rizvi served as cabinet minister in the ministry headed by Kalyan Singh in 1991–92. He was journalist by profession. He is the father of the former leader of Bharatiya Janata Party Seema Rizvi.
