= Harnath Singh Yadav =

Indian politician

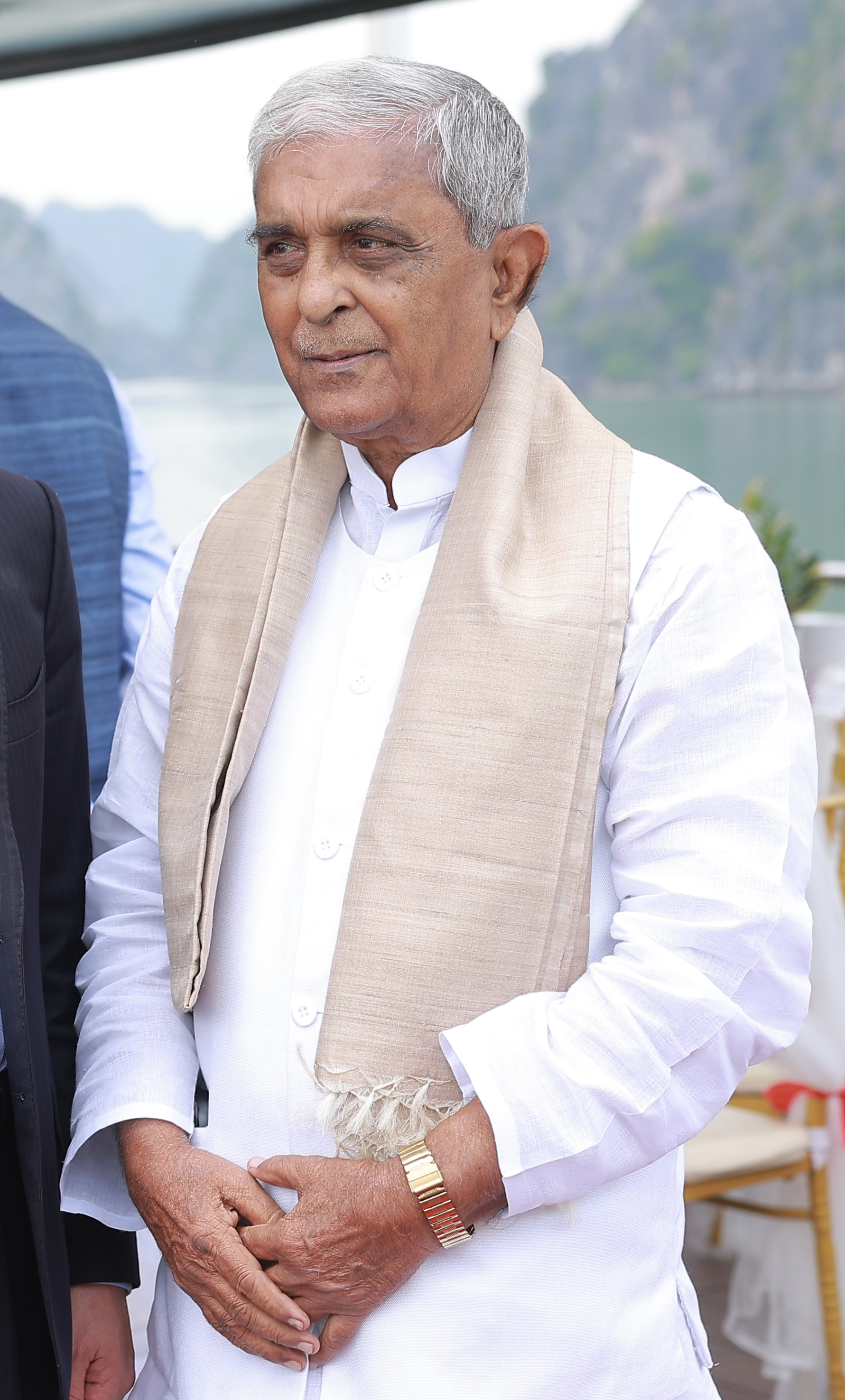
- Harnath in Vietnam in 2022

Member of Parliament, Rajya Sabha
- In office 2018–2024
- Constituency: Uttar Pradesh

Member of Legislative Council, Uttar Pradesh
- In office 1996–2008
- Succeeded by: Vivek Bansal
- Constituency: Agra (Graduates constituency)

Personal details
- Born: 1 April 1941 (age 85) Mainpuri, United Provinces, British India (present-day Uttar Pradesh, India)
- Party: Bharatiya Janata Party

Harnath Singh Yadav (born 1 April 1941) is an Indian politician. He is a former Member of Parliament, representing Uttar Pradesh in the Rajya Sabha the upper house of India's Parliament representing the Bharatiya Janata Party. He also served as a Member of Legislative Council (MLC) from Agra Graduates constituency, Uttar Pradesh from 1996 to 2008. He hails from Gopalpur village of Mainpuri district.

Harnath Singh Yadav is a former MLC who hails from Mainpuri and later moved to Etah. A former RSS zila pracharak, he later served as BJP state general secretary. He is considered close to former CM Kalyan Singh. He was elected an MLC as an independent in 1996 and later with Samajwadi Party support in 2002 from Agra Graduates constituency. He lost the council election in 2014, then he joined BJP. In the 2017 UP elections, BJP appointed him in-charge of Yadav-dominated district Mainpuri.
