= Yagya Dutt Sharma (trade unionist) =

Yagya Dutt Sharma, often known as YD, was an Indian trade unionist and politician belonging to the Communist Party of India.

Sharma was born 1 March 1918, in Jakhauli village, Rohtak District. He shifted to Delhi in 1930, and seven years later he graduated from Shri Ram College of Commerce. During his student years he was active in the All India Students Federation. He went on to finish his postgraduate studies in Economics at St. Stephen's College. He worked as a lecturer at Ramjas College. In 1939 he became a CPI member. He was one of the founders of the Delhi unit of the party in 1944, and went on to become a Central Committee member of CPI in 1951. He spent the period of 1948-1950 underground. Sharma attended the 1952 Peking Asia and Pacific Rim Peace Conference as an observer.

In 1973 he became the secretary of the All India Trade Union Congress, later becoming its vice president.

Sharma died on 11 January 2004.
