= Ajit Singh (police officer) =

Indian police officer

Ajit Singh (10 October 1945 – 7 May 1991) was an Indian Police Service officer who was killed in an encounter with militants in 1991 in Punjab, India. A 1968 batch officer, he was Deputy Inspector General of Police, Border Range, Amritsar at the time of his death. Ajit Singh served in Indian Army before joining Indian Police Services. He was awarded Vir Chakra.

His younger son Ajinder Singh (PPS) is also serving as a senior official in Punjab Police as Superintendent of Police.
