= Yashwant Singh (Uttar Pradesh Legislative Council member) =

Indian politician

Member of Uttar Pradesh Legislative Council
- In office 2018–2024
- In office 2004–2017
- Constituency: elected by MLA's

Minister of State Government of Uttar Pradesh
- In office 1997–2002
- Chief Minister: Kalyan Singh; Ram Prakash Gupta; Rajnath Singh
- Ministry& Department's: Technical Education; Excise

Member of Uttar Pradesh Legislative Assembly
- In office 1996–2002
- Preceded by: Ram Darshan
- Succeeded by: Chandradev Ram Yadav
- In office 1989–1991
- Preceded by: Hafeez Bharti
- Succeeded by: A.Salam
- Constituency: Mubarakpur

Personal details
- Born: Aldemau Saronda, Chirayakote, Mau, Uttar Pradesh
- Party: BJP (2017-Present) SP (2003-2017) BSP (1996-2003) JD (1989-1996)
- Children: Vikrant Singh Rishu MLC Azamgarh-Mau Local Authorities
- Occupation: Politician

Yashwant Singh Former Minister 4 Term MLC & 2 Term MLA. Former member of the Samajwadi Party in Uttar Pradesh. On 10 June 2016, he was re-elected to the Uttar Pradesh Legislative Council. He is also the president of Chandrasekhar trust at Darul safa Lucknow on the honour of former prime minister Chandrasekhar. He has a great political influence in Uttar Pradesh.

On 6 May 2018, he again became a member of the Uttar Pradesh Legislative Council. He had vacated his seat for Yogi Adityanath for him to continue as Chief Minister of Uttar Pradesh and had resigned from the Samajwadi Party.
