= Devendra Pratap Singh (UP politician, born 1954) =

Indian politician

Shri Devendra Pratap Singh

Member of the Uttar Pradesh Legislative Council
- Incumbent
- Assumed office 17 Nov 2010
- Constituency: Gorakhpur-Faizabaad Graduates
- In office 17 Nov 1998 – 16 Nov 2004
- Constituency: Gorakhpur-Faizabaad Graduates

Personal details
- Born: Gorakhpur,Uttar Pradesh
- Party: Bharatiya Janata Party(2015-)
- Other political affiliations: Samajwadi Party(1998-2015)
- Children: 1(son)
- Parent: Shri Harihar Singh (father) Late Smt. Kavala Devi (mother)
- Profession: Agriculture & Politician

Shri Devendra Pratap Singh is an Indian politician and a member of the Uttar Pradesh Legislative Council from the Gorakhpur Faizabaad Division Graduates Constituency.

== Political career ==
Previously, he was a member of the Samajwadi Party. He is elected for a fourth time. He was also the leader of opposition in the house of legislative council.
