= Jaipal Singh (politician) =

Indian politician

Jaipal Singh Vyast

Member of Uttar Pradesh Legislative Council
- Incumbent
- Assumed office 17 Nov 2014
- Preceded by: Naipal Singh
- Constituency: Bareilly-Moradabad Graduate

Personal details
- Born: July 1, 1954 (age 71) Vill-Sohi (Shivagarh), District-Bulandshahr, Uttar Pradesh
- Party: Bharatiya Janata Party
- Spouse: Ramwati Devi (m.1972)
- Children: 5
- Parent: Late Shri Hoti Singh (father) Late Smt Harpyari Devi (mother)
- Profession: Teacher & Agriculture

Jaipal Singh 'Vyast' is an Indian politician and Member of the Bharatiya Janata Party. Vyast is a member of the Uttar Pradesh Legislative Council from the Bareilly-Moradabad Division Graduates Constituency.
