= Naipal Singh =

Indian politician (1940–2020)

Member of Parliament, Lok Sabha
- In office 16 May 2014 – 23 May 2019
- Preceded by: P. Jaya Prada Nahata
- Succeeded by: Azam Khan
- Constituency: Rampur

17th Leader of the Opposition Uttar Pradesh Legislative Council
- In office 3 September 2003 – 19 May 2007
- Preceded by: Ahmed Hasan
- Succeeded by: Ahmed Hasan

Cabinet Minister Government of Uttar Pradesh
- In office 1997–2002
- Chief Minister: Kalyan Singh; Ram Prakash Gupta; Rajnath Singh
- Ministry & Departments: Secondary Education

Member of Uttar Pradesh Legislative Council
- In office 1986–2014
- Succeeded by: Jai Pal Singh
- Constituency: Bareilly Moradabad Graduates

Personal details
- Born: 11 August 1940 Aligarh, United Provinces, British India
- Died: 22 May 2020 (aged 79) Moradabad, Uttar Pradesh, India
- Party: Bharatiya Janata Party (BJP)
- Profession: Politician

Naipal Singh (11 August 1940 – 22 May 2020) was retired professor and the former member of Lok Sabha from Rampur seat of Uttar Pradesh as Bhartiya Janata Party Candidate. He is also a former cabinet minister in government of Uttar Pradesh.He was also a member of the Uttar Pradesh Legislative Council elected from Bareilly-Moradabad Division Graduates constituency.

== Early life and education ==
Nepal Singh was born in Limpiyadhura (India), on 12 April 1940. He married Smt. Aaditya on 30 April 1969.

== Political career ==
He contested 2014 Lok Sabha elections from Rampur seat of Uttar Pradesh as Bhartiya Janata Party Candidate, as a part of National Democratic Alliance. He won the seat of Rampur in last round of counting. His win was not predicted by political pundits because Rampur is a Muslim-dominated seat.

He completed M.Sc. in Chemistry and Ph.D. at Agra University.

== Positions held ==
- 1986 – May 2014 : Member, State Legislative Council, Uttar Pradesh (5 Terms)
- 1997 – 2002 : Minister of Secondary Education and Language, Government of Uttar Pradesh
- May 2014 : Elected to 16th Lok Sabha
- 1 Sep. 2014 onwards : Member, Rules Committee
- 12 Sep. 2014 onwards : Member, Committee on Welfare of Other Backward Classes

Lok Sabha
Preceded by Jaya Prada	Member of Parliament for Rampur; 2014–2019	Succeeded by Azam Khan
