= Sunil Singh Yadav =

Indian politician (born 1981)

Sunil Singh Yadav "Sajan"

Dairy and Milk Minister of State
- In office 21 May 2013 – 14 March 2017

Personal details
- Born: 16 February 1981 (age 45) Unnao, Uttar Pradesh, India
- Party: Samajwadi Party
- Education: Lucknow University

Sunil Singh Yadav (born 16 February 1981) also known as Sunil Singh Sajan is an Indian politician. Sunil was elected as Member of Legislative Council from Lucknow-Unnao seat (2016-2022). He was assigned Dairy And Milk State Minister in Akhilesh Yadav's cabinet in Uttar Pradesh. He was National President of Samajwadi Party Kshatra Sabha.

== Early life and education ==
He hails from Bachuwa Kheda Hilauli village in Unnao district of Uttar Pradesh. He is MA and LLB from Lucknow University, Lucknow.

== Political career ==
He joined Samajwadi Party on 1 October 1998 and now he is Member of Legislative Council (MLC) from Lucknow-Unnao seat. Sunil presents his party as spokesperson also.

Sunil contested his first election as student leader and was elected vice president of KKV College, Lucknow University on 20 April 1999 and later on 9 November 2004 he was elected as president of KKC College, Lucknow University.

Later, he was elected as state president of Samajwadi Chhatra Sabha (Student wing of Samajwadi Party) on 26 April 2005. He was elected as national president of Samajwadi Chhatra Sabha on 10 December 2010.

Sunil Singh Yadav was part of a delegation as national president of Samajwadi Chhatra Sabha which visited China on 20 September 2011. This delegation had 500 government officials, heads of other youth organizations, social workers, entrepreneurs, college students and rural youth representatives. During the 10-day stay, this delegation participated in cultural exchange activities with young Chinese people and visited companies, communities, universities and rural areas of People's Republic of China.

He is the eyes and ears of CM Akhilesh Yadav. He is a former president of the city's Jai Narain Degree College Students' Union. Sunil was the architect of the first agitation by the SP against the current Bahujan Samaj Party government, on 8 January 2008, when it sought restoration of the students' union and opposed fee hike. When he was beaten up by the police and jailed for 19 days, Akhilesh sat on his first Dharna, outside the SSP Lucknow's office.

Sunil Yadav's position was cemented as police continued to crack down on SP men. While Leader of the Opposition Shivpal Singh Yadav was slapped by a policeman, an SP worker lost his life in police firing. Another committed self-immolation at Jantar Mantar in New Delhi.

By the time Mulayam Singh Yadav had withdrawn the agitation, Sunil Singh was a known name in the party. Currently national president of the SP's students' wing, Sunil again shot into news when he was pinned down by Lucknow DIG D K Thakur during an SP agitation against price rise in Lucknow on 9 April 2011. He broke his hand and was sent to prison.

On 21 May 2013, he was made state minister of dairy and milk in UP CM Akhilesh Yadav's cabinet. Sunil Singh Yadav lost by 3088 votes to Ram chandra Singh Pradhan of Bharatiya Janata Party in the MLC election in the year 2022.

On 27 April 2014 UP Chief Minister Akhilesh Yadav sent his point man Sunil Singh Sajan to lead a team of 50 party volunteers with the relief material from the state for the needy people in quake hit Kathmandu. This relief team consisted of Members from SP’s all four youth wings – Samajwadi Yuvjan Sabha, Lohia Vahini, Samajwadi Kshatra Sabha and Mulayam Singh Youth.
