= Seema Rizvi =

Indian politician

Member of the Uttar Pradesh Legislative Council

Minister of State with Independent charge for Electronics and Information Technology
- In office May 3, 2002 – August 29, 2003
- Constituency: Member of the Uttar Pradesh Legislative Council

Personal details
- Died: 19 August 2009 Lucknow, India
- Party: Bharatiya Janata Party
- Parents: Aizaz Rizvi (father); Asifa Zamani (mother)
- Profession: Professor and politician

Seema Rizvi (Born Aisha Aizaz; 1966 – 2009) was an Indian politician. She was a leader of the Bharatiya Janata Party from Uttar Pradesh and a member of the Uttar Pradesh Legislative Council. Rizvi served as a Minister of State with Independent charge for Electronics and Information Technology in the ministry headed by Kumari Mayawati from May 3, 2002, to August 29, 2003. At the time of her death, she was the head of the Urdu department at Lucknow University.

On August 19, 2009, Rizvi suffered a brain haemorrhage and collapsed in her seat at the Assembly. The amount of time that it took for Rizvi to receive medical treatment is disuputed. The Times of India says she was immediately rushed to the hospital contrasted by the Milli Gazette, which says there was a delay of fifty minutes before medical help arrived. Once treated, doctors were able to remove the blockage in Rizvi's brain, but Rizvi was still in critical condition. She died on August 19, 2009.
