= Bukkal Nawab =

Indian politician

Member of Uttar Pradesh Legislative Council
- In office 06 May 2018 – 05 May 2024
- Preceded by: Akhilesh Yadav

Personal details
- Born: Lucknow (India)
- Party: BJP (August 2017-Present )
- Other political affiliations: Samajwadi Party (till July 2017)
- Children: Faisal Nawab
- Occupation: Politician And Landlord

Bukkal Nawab is an Indian Politician from the BJP and an ex-senior leader of the Samajwadi Party in Uttar Pradesh. Nawab was a close associate of the Samajwadi Party patron Mulayam Singh Yadav, but he joined BJP and is now considered close to Uttar Pradesh Chief Minister Yogi Adityanath. He belongs to a prominent Nawab family while his ancestors served as the heads in the Royal Kingdom of Awadh. His father Dara Nawab served as an Aviator under the Indian Government. Nawab started his political career in 1989 when he emerged victorious as an independent candidate from the Daulatganj ward in the Lucknow Nagar Nigam elections and topped the state on the basis of highest marginal win.

Bukkal Nawab joined the Samajwadi Party in 1992 where he served as the General Secretary of the party in the state until 2004 when he was appointed the Chairman in the Labour department with a State Minister status by the ruling government. He has contested twice for the Uttar Pradesh Legislative Assembly elections representing Samajwadi Party from the Lucknow West seat but lost both the times with a minor marginal difference. On 24 July 2012 he was elected to the Uttar Pradesh Legislative Council on the seat fallen vacant due to resignation of Chief Minister Mayawati, who chose to go to Rajya Sabha after being defeated in the assembly elections. In 2015 his statement on the construction of Ram Mandir where he offered Ten Lakh rupees made countrywide controversy as the statement did not match the Party's ideology. On 10 June 2016, he was re-elected to the Uttar Pradesh Legislative Council. On July 29, 2017 he resigned from Samajwadi Party. On 31 July 2017, he joined BJP in presence of Party President Amit Shah. At present Nawab is a member of State BJP Executive Committee. On May 8, 2018, he was re-elected as a Member Of Uttar Pradesh Legislative Council from BJP.
