= Parvez Ali =

Indian politician

Member of the Uttar Pradesh Legislative Council Moradabad Bijnor
- In office 2016–2022

Personal details
- Political party: Samajwadi Party

Parvez Ali is an Indian politician and member of Uttar Pradesh Legislative Council. He represents the Constituency Moradabad Bijnor and is member of Samajwadi Party.
