= Ashok Dhawan =

Indian politician

Member of the Uttar Pradesh Legislative Council
- In office 2018–2024
- Constituency: elected by Legislative Assembly members
- In office 2006–2012
- Constituency: elected by Legislative Assembly members

Personal details
- Born: 2 August 1947
- Party: BJP
- Spouse: Smt. Rama Dhawan
- Children: 1
- Parent: Late Madanlal Dhawan

Ashok Dhawan was a member of the Uttar Pradesh Legislative Council. In the elections on 23 March 2018, BJP won 11 out of 13 seats and the remaining two were won by Samajwadi Party and Bahujan Samaj Party each.
