= Raj Bahadur Singh Chandel =

Indian politician

Member of Legislative Council
- Incumbent
- Assumed office 1992
- Constituency: Kanpur

Personal details
- Born: 1947 (age 78–79) Uttar Pradesh
- Party: Independent
- Education: Post Graduate
- Profession: Politician, teacher

Raj Bahadur Singh Chandel (born 1947) is a Member of Uttar Pradesh Legislative Council and is active in teachers' politics. He is the son of Shri Ram Pal Chandel.

== Career ==
He retired as a post graduate teacher of chemistry from Raja Shankar Sahay Inter College Unnao in 2001. He has been a Member of Legislative Council of Uttar Pradesh from Teacher Constituency (Kanpur Nagar, Kanpur Dehat, Unnao) since 2017.

He became active in teacher politics from 1977. First time in 1992 he won the election of Member of Legislative Council Uttar Pradesh for Kanpur Teachers Constituency as Teachers Group candidate. He also won the election of Member of Legislative council Uttar Pradesh for Kanpur Teachers Constituency as Teachers Group candidate in 1998 and 2004. In 2010 he contested for Member of Legislative council Uttar Pradesh for Kanpur Teachers Constituency as an independent candidate and won the seat of MLC.

Chandel won the seat of MLC from Kanpur Teachers Constituency in 2017.
