= Jugal Kishore (Uttar Pradesh politician) =

Indian politician

Jugul Kishore

MP of Rajya Sabha for Uttar Pradesh
- In office 5 July 2010 – 4 July 2016
- Succeeded by: Beni Prasad Verma

Personal details
- Party: Bharatiya Janata Party
- Other political affiliations: Bahujan Samaj Party

Jugal Kishore (born 24 February 1959 in Churai Purwa, Shivpuri, Lakhimpur Kheri (Uttar Pradesh)) is a politician from Bahujan Samaj Party and a Member of the Parliament of India representing Uttar Pradesh in the Rajya Sabha, the upper house of the Indian Parliament.
