= Swatantra Dev Singh =

Indian politician

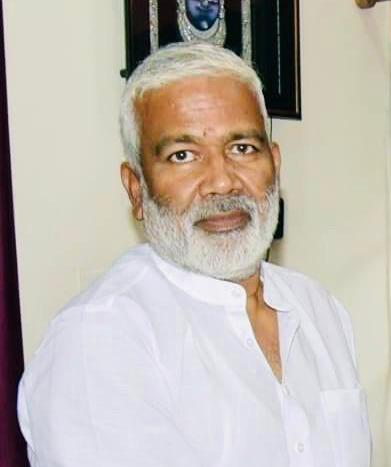

Cabinet Minister Government of Uttar Pradesh
- Incumbent
- Assumed office 25 March 2022
- Chief Minister: Yogi Adityanath
- Ministry & Department's: Jal Shakti; Disaster Management
- Preceded by: Mahendra Singh

President of Bharatiya Janata Party, Uttar Pradesh
- In office 16 July 2019 – 25 August 2022
- Preceded by: Mahendra Nath Pandey
- Succeeded by: Chaudhary Bhupendra Singh

Minister of State Government of Uttar Pradesh
- In office 22 March 2017 – 19 August 2019
- Chief Minister: Yogi Adityanath
- Ministry & Department's: Transport (Independent Charge); Protocol (MOS); Power (MOS)

Member of Uttar Pradesh Legislative Council
- Incumbent
- Assumed office 8 September 2017
- Constituency: elected by Legislative Assembly members
- In office 7 July 2004 – 6 July 2010
- Constituency: elected by Legislative Assembly members

Leader of the House Uttar Pradesh Legislative Council
- In office 20 May 2022 – 10 August 2022
- Preceded by: Dr. Dinesh Sharma
- Succeeded by: Keshav Prasad Maurya

President Bharatiya Janata Yuva Morcha, Uttar Pradesh
- In office 2001–2004

Personal details
- Born: 13 February 1964 (age 62) Mirzapur, Uttar Pradesh, India
- Education: Bundelkhand University, B.Sc.
- Website: Swatantra Dev Singh

Swatantra Dev Singh (born 13 February 1964) is an Indian politician and currently he is cabinet minister in the Ministry of Jal Shakti, Government of Uttar Pradesh. As Minister of Jal Shakti in Uttar Pradesh, he has overseen the implementation of the Jal Jeevan Mission in the state, under which Uttar Pradesh ranked first in providing rural households with tap water connections.

Swatantra Dev Singh, was the first person in his family to enter politics and subsequently join BJP. He is one of the most prominent faces of OBCs in Uttar Pradesh.

== Early life ==
Singh was born on 13 February 1964 in Ori village of Jamalpur block of Mirzapur district. His mother's name was Rama Devi and father's name was Allar Singh. They were married in Sigar village of Jhansi district. Born in Mirzapur district, Swatantra Dev Singh made Jalaun of Bundelkhand a work land. While starting politics from here, today his sting started ringing in the entire state. Born in a family with no political background, Swatantra Dev is the first person in his family who is joining RSS and currently playing an active role in the politics of the state through a political party like BJP.

== Positions held ==
1. ABVP General Secretary (Organization) - (1990-1991)
2. BJYM Uttar Pradesh In-Charge of Kanpur - (1991-1994)
3. BJYM Uttar Pradesh In-Charge of Bundelkhand region - (1994-1996)
4. BJYM Uttar Pradesh General Secretary - (1996-2001)
5. BJYM Uttar Pradesh President - (2001-2004)
6. Chairman of District Cooperative Bank, Jalaun
7. Member of Uttar Pradesh Legislative Council - (2004-2010) 1st Term
8. BJP Uttar Pradesh General Secretary (Thrice) - (2004-2017)
9. BJP Uttar Pradesh Vice President - (2010-2012)
10. BJP Membership In-Charge - (2014-2015)
11. Deputed in Gujarat Legislative Assembly Elections - (2017)
12. Deputed in Karnataka Legislative Assembly Elections - (2018)
13. Deputed in Madhya Pradesh Legislative Assembly Elections - (2018)
14. BJP In-Charge of Madhya Pradesh Lok Sabha Elections - (2019)
15. Minister of State (Independent Charge), Transport & Minister of State, Protocol & Power in Government of Uttar Pradesh- (2017-2019)
16. Member of Uttar Pradesh Legislative Council - (2017-2021) 2nd Term
17. President: BJP Uttar Pradesh - (2019 -2022)
18. Member of Uttar Pradesh Legislative Council - (2021-) 3rd Term
19. Cabinet Minister of Jal Shakti in Government of Uttar Pradesh - (2022-)
