= Chaudhary Bhupendra Singh =

Indian politician

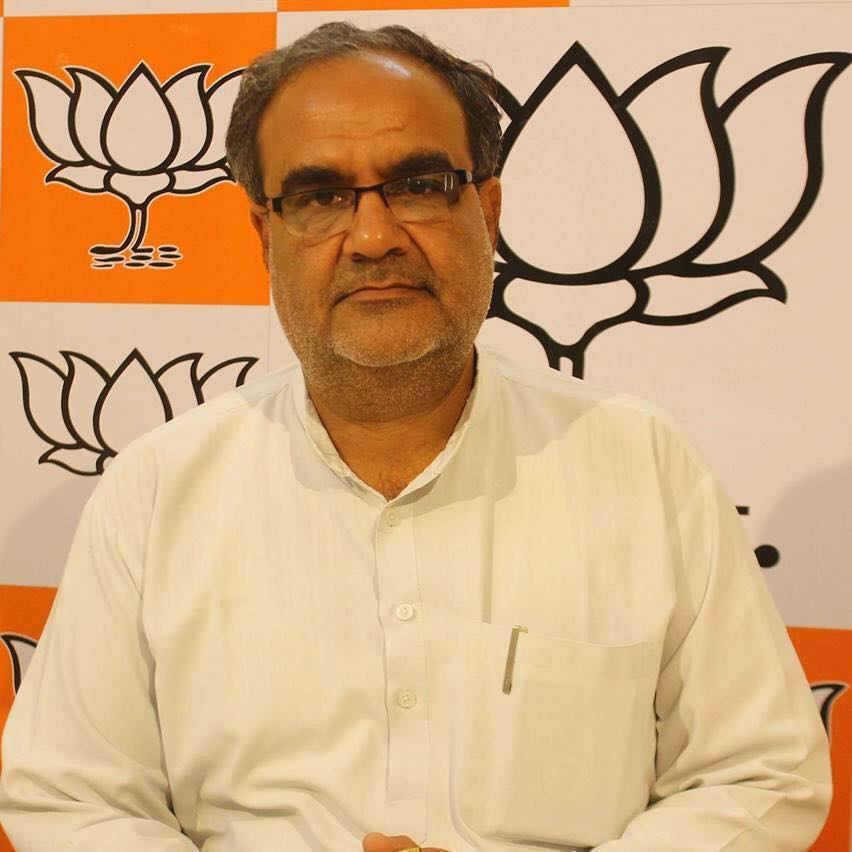
- Bhupendra Singh at BJP Office, Lucknow

President of Bharatiya Janata Party, Uttar Pradesh
- In office 25 August 2022 – 13 December 2025
- National President: JP Nadda
- Preceded by: Swatantra Dev Singh
- Succeeded by: Pankaj Chaudhary

Cabinet Minister Government of Uttar Pradesh
- In office 19 March 2017 – 30 August 2022
- Ministry & Department's: Micro Small and Medium Enterprises
- Incumbent
- Assumed office 10 May 2026
- Chief Minister: Yogi Adityanath
- Ministry & Department's: Panchayati Raj

Member of Uttar Pradesh Legislative Council
- Incumbent
- Assumed office 7 July 2016
- Preceded by: Hriday Narayan Dikshit
- Constituency: elected by Legislative Assembly members

Personal details
- Born: 30 June 1968 (age 58) Mahendari Sikandarpur, Uttar Pradesh, India
- Party: Bharatiya Janata Party
- Profession: Politician

Chaudhary Bhupendra Singh is an Indian Politician who was the 14th state president of Bharatiya Janata Party in Uttar Pradesh and former cabinet minister for Panchayati Raj in Uttar Pradesh Government . He hails from Moradabad in Western UP.

On 10 June 2016, he was elected to the Uttar Pradesh Legislative Council.

== Early life ==
Bhupendra Singh was born in Mahendra Sikanderpur village in the Thana Chajalat area of Moradabad district in 1966 to a farmer family of Jat descent. He passed the 12th examination from RN Inter College, Moradabad.

== Early political career ==
Bhupendra Singh joined the Vishwa Hindu Parishad as a student leader and went on to join the BJP in 1991. Two years later, in 1993, he became a member of the BJP's district executive. In 2006, he was made the regional minister of Moradabad by the BJP and was made the regional chief of the party in 2012.
