= Bhagwati Singh =

Indian politician (died 2021)

Member of Parliament, Rajya Sabha
- In office 2004–2010
- Constituency: Uttar Pradesh

Personal details
- Born: Bhagwati Singh; 26 August 1933
- Died: 4 April 2021 (aged 87) Lucknow, Uttar Pradesh, India
- Party: Samajwadi Party
- Occupation: Politician

Bhagwati Singh (26 August 1933 – 4 April 2021) was a politician and founder of the Samajwadi Party and a member of the Parliament of India representing Uttar Pradesh in the Rajya Sabha from 2004 to 2010 and a member of the Uttar Pradesh Legislative Assembly.

== Death ==
He died on 4 April 2021 at the age of 87 during his visit to Chandra Bhanu Gupta Krishi Mahavidyalaya of Bakshi Ka Talab from COVID-19. The last rites of Singh will not be done as he had pledged to donate his body to the King George Medical University.
