= Ajit Singh (politician, died 2004) =

Indian politician from Uttar Pradesh

Ajeet Singh

Member of Uttar Pradesh Legislative Council
- In office 1997–2004
- Succeeded by: Ranjit Singh

Personal details
- Born: September 4, 1964 Unnao, Uttar Pradesh, India.
- Died: September 4, 2004 (aged 40) Unnao, Uttar Pradesh, India
- Party: Samajwadi Party; Bharatiya Janata Party
- Spouse: Shakun Singh
- Children: 3

Ajit Singh (died September 4, 2004) was an Indian politician affiliated with the Bharatiya Janata Party. He served as a Member of the Uttar Pradesh Legislative Council twice.

Ajit Singh came into the limelight in the late 1990s. His wife is currently zila panchayat adhyaksh from Unnao . He was inducted into the Bharatiya Janata Party by Rajnath Singh.

He was affiliated with the Samajwadi Party and the Bharatiya Janata Party. He served as a Member of the Uttar Pradesh Legislative Council twice.

== Death ==
He was shot dead on 4 September 2004, by five men allegedly led by MLA Akhilesh Kumar Singh at a hotel in Unnao, where he was celebrating his birthday. A First information report (FIR) was registered against Akhilesh Singh, who was then close to the Samajwadi, Ramesh Kalia, a BJP leader, and three others. Akhilesh was the prime suspect in the murder case, but his role was not established.
