= Jagjivan Prasad Babu =

Indian politician

Balram Yadav

Member(elect) of Uttar Pradesh Legislative Council
- Incumbent
- Assumed office 6 July 2016
- Preceded by: Ram Kumar Kureel, BSP

Personal details
- Party: Samajwadi Party
- Occupation: Politician

Jagjivan Prasad Babu is a leader of the Samajwadi Party in Uttar Pradesh. On 10 June 2016, he was elected to the Uttar Pradesh Legislative Council.
