= Om Prakash Sharma (Uttar Pradesh politician) =

Indian politician (died 2021)

Om Prakash Sharma (1933/4 – 16 January 2021) was an Indian politician, who had served as Member of Legislative Council in Uttar Pradesh from 1972 until he was defeated in 2020. He was the president of Uttar Pradesh Madhyamik Shikshak Sangh. He died of dysentery on 16 January 2021. He was also appointed the Pro tem Chairman of the UP upper house by Uttar Pradesh Governor Ram Naik in 2016.

== See also ==
- Uttar Pradesh Legislative Council
