= Narendra Kumar Kashyap =

Indian politician

Minister of State (Independent Charge) Government of Uttar Pradesh
- Incumbent
- Assumed office 25 March 2022
- Chief Minister: Yogi Adityanath
- Ministry & Departments: Backward Classes Welfare; Disabled Empowerment
- Preceded by: Anil Rajbhar

Member of Uttar Pradesh Legislative Council
- Incumbent
- Assumed office 6 July 2022
- Constituency: elected by members of Legislative Assembly
- In office 1998–2010
- Constituency: elected by members of Legislative Assembly

Member of Parliament, Rajya Sabha
- In office 5 July 2010 – 4 July 2016
- Constituency: Uttar Pradesh

Personal details
- Born: 15 January 1963 (age 63) Saravani, Ghaziabad district
- Party: Bharatiya Janata Party (2017-present)
- Other political affiliations: Bahujan Samaj Party (till 2017)
- Spouse: Devindri Kashyap (m. 1987)
- Children: 2 sons, 2 daughters
- Parents: Shiv Charan Kashyap (father); Sarla Devi (mother)
- Education: B.A., LLB
- Alma mater: Meerut University

Narendra Kumar Kashyap is a politician from Bharatiya Janata Party. He was a Bahujan Samaj Party Member of the Parliament of India representing Uttar Pradesh in the Rajya Sabha, the upper house of the Indian Parliament.

He has studied BA and LLB and is Advocate by profession.

Now currently he is on bail for his daughter in law's dowry harassment and dowry death case.
