= Yagya Datt Sharma (Uttar Pradesh politician) =

Indian politician

Dr. Yagya Datt Sharma is an Indian politician and member of the Bharatiya Janata Party. Sharma was a member of the Uttar Pradesh Legislative Council from Allahabad-Jhansi Division Graduates constituencies. Mr Sharma won the Allahabad - Jhansi division graduates constituency in 2015 in which he got some tough competition from contenders like Babu Lal Tiwari of Jhansi and Ajay Kumar Singh of Allahabad. He was also Deputy Leader of House in the Uttar Pradesh Legislative Council.
