= Vidhan Bhavan, Lucknow =

Seat of the Uttar Pradesh state legislature

Uttar Pradesh Legislature Building
- Uttar Pradesh Vidhan Bhavan
- Uttar Pradesh; Government Seal

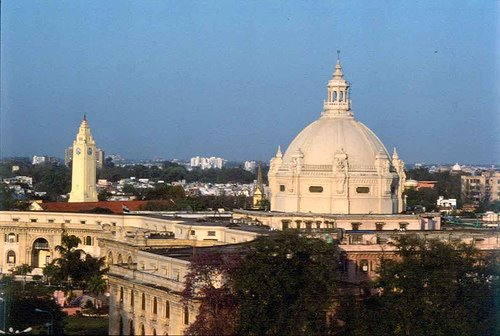
- Vidhan Bhavan building in Lucknow
- Alternative names: Council House (Né); Vidhan Sabha Bhavan; Assembly House
- Etymology: Vidhan Sabha of UP

General information
- Status: Completed
- Type: Legislature Building
- Architectural style: Indo-European architecture
- Location: Vidhan Sabha Marg, Lucknow, Uttar Pradesh – 226 001, Lucknow, India
- Coordinates: 26.870649°N 80.965277°E
- Elevation: 114 meters
- Current tenants: Uttar Pradesh Legislature
- Groundbreaking: 15 December 1922
- Construction started: 15 December 1922
- Inaugurated: 21 February 1928
- Cost: ₹21 lakh (equivalent to ₹47 crore or US$4.8 million in 2026) (in 1922)

Technical details
- Material: Sandstone

Design and construction
- Architects: Samuel Swinton Jacob and Heera Singh
- Quantity surveyor: Harcourt Butler
- Main contractor: Messrs Martin and Co

Renovating team
- Architect: A.L. Mortimer
- Renovating firm: Messrs Ford and Macdonald

Other information
- Seating capacity: 550 (Legislative Assembly chamber: 450; Legislative Council chamber: 100)
- Public transit: Secretariat Metro Station

Located in Lucknow, the Vidhan Bhavan is the seat of the bicameral legislature of the Indian state of Uttar Pradesh. The lower house is the Vidhan Sabha (Legislative Assembly) and the upper house the Vidhan Parishad (Legislative Council). The Vidhan Sabha had 431 members until 1967, but now comprises 403 directly elected members. Historically, one member from Anglo-Indian committee was nominated to the Vidhan Sabha, but that practice was discontinued in 2020 through 104th Constitutional Amendment Act, 2019. The Vidhan Parishad has 100 members.

Built in 1928, the building was originally called the "Council House". It has been home to the legislature since 1937, along with housing other important offices of government.

== History ==
In the early 20th century, the capital of what is now the state of Uttar Pradesh was Allahabad; a decision was taken in 1922 to move the capital to Lucknow and to construct a building there to house the Assembly Constituency. On 15 December 1922, then Governor of Uttar Pradesh, Spencer Harcourt Butler, laid the foundation of the Vidhan Bhavan. The building was designed by Samuel Swinton Jacob and Heera Singh; Singh also drew up the blueprint of the building. Butler subsequently monitored the construction of the building. The building was completed in little over five years at a cost of ₹21 lakh (equivalent to ₹47 crore or US$4.8 million in 2026) (1922 cost not adjusted for inflation) and was inaugurated on 21 February 1928.

== Building ==
Construction of Vidhan Bhavan started 15 December 1922 and took little over five years to complete. The building is made of carved light brown sandstone from Mirzapur. Many of the inside halls, galleries and verandas are built of marble from Agra and Jaipur. Circular marble staircases run on both sides of the entrance hall and the walls of the staircases are embellished with paintings. The main chamber of the building is octagonal in shape with a domed roof. A separate chamber for the upper house was constructed between 1935 and 1937. The buildings of both houses are connected by veranda with offices on both sides.

== Composition ==
Articles 168 to 212 in Part VI of the constitution of India deal with the organisation, composition, duration, officers, procedures, privileges, powers and so on of the state legislature. The Uttar Pradesh Legislature (Vidhan Bhavan) consists of two houses called the Vidhan Sabha and the Vidhan Parishad with the governor of Uttar Pradesh acting as their head.

=== Governor of Uttar Pradesh ===
Articles 153 to 167 in Part VI of the constitution of India deal with the state executive. The state executive consists of the governor, the chief minister, council of ministers and the advocate general of the state. The governor is the chief executive head of the state. The governor also acts as the agent of the center.

=== Uttar Pradesh Legislative Assembly (Vidhan Sabha) ===
The Uttar Pradesh Legislative Assembly is the lower house of the bicameral legislature. It has a total of 403 members. Till 1967, it had a strength of 431 members, including one nominated Anglo-Indian member. According to the recommendation of the Delimitation Commission, which is appointed after every Census, it was revised to 426. After reorganisation of the state on 9 November 2000, the strength of the Legislative Assembly has become 404 including one nominated member to represent the Anglo-Indian community. The term of the Vidhan Sabha is five years unless dissolved earlier. The election is held on the principle of "one adult one vote".

==== Terms ====
Every five years new election is done. And new assembly is elected by the people of Uttar Pradesh.

Terms Since 1952
Vidhan Sabha	Constitution	Dissolution	Days
1st	20 May 1952	31 March 1957	1,776
2nd	1 April 1957	6 March 1962	1,800
3rd	7 March 1962	9 March 1967	1,828
4th	10 March 1967	15 April 1968	402
5th	26 February 1969	4 March 1974	1,832
6th	4 March 1974	30 April 1977	1,153
7th	23 June 1977	17 February 1980	969
8th	9 June 1980	10 March 1985	1,735
9th	10 March 1985	29 November 1989	1,725
10th	2 December 1989	4 April 1991	488
11th	22 June 1991	6 December 1992	533
12th	4 December 1993	28 October 1995	693
13th	17 October 1996	7 March 2002	1,967
14th	26 February 2002	13 May 2007	1,902
15th	13 May 2007	9 March 2012	1,762
16th	8 March 2012	11 March 2017	1,829
17th	12 March 2017	28 March 2022	1,842
18th	29 March 2022	Ongoing	4 years, 205 days

==== Constituencies ====
There are total 403 constituencies given below in the table.

403 Constituencies of UP Legislative Assembly
District	No.	Constituency
Saharanpur	1	Behat
Saharanpur	2	Nakur
Saharanpur	3	Saharanpur Nagar
Saharanpur	4	Saharanpur
Saharanpur	5	Deoband
Saharanpur	6	Rampur Maniharan (SC)
Saharanpur	7	Gangoh
Shamli	8	Kairana
Shamli	9	Thana Bhawan
Shamli	10	Shamli
Muzaffarnagar	11	Budhana
Muzaffarnagar	12	Charthawal
Muzaffarnagar	13	Purqazi (SC)
Muzaffarnagar	14	Muzaffarnagar
Muzaffarnagar	15	Khatauli
Muzaffarnagar	16	Meerapur
Bijnor	17	Najibabad
Bijnor	18	Nagina (SC)
Bijnor	19	Barhapur
Bijnor	20	Dhampur
Bijnor	21	Nehtaur (SC)
Bijnor	22	Bijnor
Bijnor	23	Chandpur
Bijnor	24	Noorpur
Moradabad	25	Kanth
Moradabad	26	Thakurdwara
Moradabad	27	Moradabad Rural
Moradabad	28	Moradabad Nagar
Moradabad	29	Kundarki
Moradabad	30	Bilari
Sambhal	31	Chandausi (SC)
Sambhal	32	Asmoli
Sambhal	33	Sambhal
Rampur	34	Suar
Rampur	35	Chamraua
Rampur	36	Bilaspur
Rampur	37	Rampur
Rampur	38	Milak (SC)
Amroha	39	Dhanaura (SC)
Amroha	40	Naugawan Sadat
Amroha	41	Amroha
Amroha	42	Hasanpur
Meerut	43	Siwalkhas
Meerut	44	Sardhana
Meerut	45	Hastinapur
Meerut	46	Kithore
Meerut	47	Meerut Cantt.
Meerut	48	Meerut City
Meerut	49	Meerut South
Bagpat	50	Chhaprauli
Bagpat	51	Baraut
Bagpat	52	Baghpat
Ghaziabad	53	Loni
Ghaziabad	54	Muradnagar
Ghaziabad	55	Sahibabad
Ghaziabad	56	Ghaziabad
Ghaziabad	57	Modi Nagar
Hapur	58	Dholana
Hapur	59	Hapur
Hapur	60	Garhmukteshwar
Gautam Buddh Nagar	61	Noida
Gautam Buddh Nagar	62	Dadri
Gautam Buddh Nagar	63	Jewar
Bulandshahr	64	Sikandrabad
Bulandshahr	65	Bulandshahr
Bulandshahr	66	Syana
Bulandshahr	67	Anupshahr
Bulandshahr	68	Debai
Bulandshahr	69	Shikarpur
Bulandshahr	70	Khurja (SC)
Aligarh	71	Khair (SC)
Aligarh	72	Barauli
Aligarh	73	Atrauli
Aligarh	74	Chharra
Aligarh	75	Koil
Aligarh	76	Aligarh
Aligarh	77	Iglas (SC)
Hathras	78	Hathras (SC)
Hathras	79	Sadabad
Hathras	80	Sikandra Rao
Mathura	81	Chhata
Mathura	82	Mant
Mathura	83	Goverdhan
Mathura	84	Mathura
Mathura	85	Baldev (SC)
Agra	86	Etmadpur
Agra	87	Agra Cantt. (SC)
Agra	88	Agra South
Agra	89	Agra North
Agra	90	Agra Rural (SC)
Agra	91	Fatehpur Sikri
Agra	92	Kheragarh
Agra	93	Fatehabad
Agra	94	Bah
Firozabad	95	Tundla (SC)
Firozabad	96	Jasrana
Firozabad	97	Firozabad
Firozabad	98	Shikohabad
Firozabad	99	Sirsaganj
Kasganj	100	Kasganj
Kasganj	101	Amanpur
Kasganj	102	Patiyali
Etah	103	Aliganj
Etah	104	Etah
Etah	105	Marhara
Etah	106	Jalesar (SC)
Mainpuri	107	Mainpuri
Mainpuri	108	Bhongaon
Mainpuri	109	Kishni (SC)
Mainpuri	110	Karhal
Sambhal	111	Gunnaur
Budaun	112	Bisauli (SC)
Budaun	113	Sahaswan
Budaun	114	Bilsi
Budaun	115	Badaun
Budaun	116	Shekhupur
Budaun	117	Dataganj
Bareilly	118	Baheri
Bareilly	119	Meerganj
Bareilly	120	Bhojipura
Bareilly	121	Nawabganj
Bareilly	122	Faridpur (SC)
Bareilly	123	Bithari Chainpur
Bareilly	124	Bareilly
Bareilly	125	Bareilly Cantt
Bareilly	126	Aonla
Pilibhit	127	Pilibhit
Pilibhit	128	Barkhera
Pilibhit	129	Puranpur (SC)
Pilibhit	130	Bisalpur
Shahjahanpur	131	Katra
Shahjahanpur	132	Jalalabad
Shahjahanpur	133	Tilhar
Shahjahanpur	134	Powayan (SC)
Shahjahanpur	135	Shahjahanpur
Shahjahanpur	136	Dadraul
Lakhimpur Kheri	137	Palia
Lakhimpur Kheri	138	Nighasan
Lakhimpur Kheri	139	Gola Gokarnnath
Lakhimpur Kheri	140	Sri Nagar (SC)
Lakhimpur Kheri	141	Dhaurahra
Lakhimpur Kheri	142	Lakhimpur
Lakhimpur Kheri	143	Kasta (SC)
Lakhimpur Kheri	144	Mohammadi
Sitapur	145	Maholi
Sitapur	146	Sitapur
Sitapur	147	Hargaon (SC)
Sitapur	148	Laharpur
Sitapur	149	Biswan
Sitapur	150	Sevata
Sitapur	151	Mahmoodabad
Sitapur	152	Sidhauli (SC)
Sitapur	153	Misrikh (SC)
Hardoi	154	Sawayazpur
Hardoi	155	Shahabad
Hardoi	156	Hardoi
Hardoi	157	Gopamau (SC)
Hardoi	158	Sandi (SC)
Hardoi	159	Bilgram-Mallanwan
Hardoi	160	Balamau (SC)
Hardoi	161	Sandila
Unnao	162	Bangarmau
Unnao	163	Safipur (SC)
Unnao	164	Mohan (SC)
Unnao	165	Unnao
Unnao	166	Bhagwantnagar
Unnao	167	Purwa
Lucknow	168	Malihabad (SC)
Lucknow	169	Bakshi Kaa Talab
Lucknow	170	Sarojini Nagar
Lucknow	171	Lucknow West
Lucknow	172	Lucknow North
Lucknow	173	Lucknow East
Lucknow	174	Lucknow Central
Lucknow	175	Lucknow Cantt
Lucknow	176	Mohanlalganj (SC)
Raebareli	177	Bachhrawan (SC)
Amethi	178	Tiloi
Raebareli	179	Harchandpur
Raebareli	180	Rae Bareli
Raebareli	181	Salon (SC)
Raebareli	182	Sareni
Raebareli	183	Unchahar
Amethi	184	Jagdishpur (SC)
Amethi	185	Gauriganj
Amethi	186	Amethi
Sultanpur	187	Isauli
Sultanpur	188	Sultanpur
Sultanpur	189	Sadar
Sultanpur	190	Lambhua
Sultanpur	191	Kadipur (SC)
Farrukhabad	192	Kaimganj (SC)
Farrukhabad	193	Amritpur
Farrukhabad	194	Farrukhabad
Farrukhabad	195	Bhojpur
Kannauj	196	Chhibramau
Kannauj	197	Tirwa
Kannauj	198	Kannauj (SC)
Etawah	199	Jaswantnagar
Etawah	200	Etawah
Etawah	201	Bharthana (SC)
Auraiya	202	Bidhuna
Auraiya	203	Dibiyapur
Auraiya	204	Auraiya (SC)
Kanpur Dehat	205	Rasulabad (SC)
Kanpur Dehat	206	Akbarpur-Raniya
Kanpur Dehat	207	Sikandra
Kanpur Dehat	208	Bhognipur
Kanpur Nagar	209	Bilhaur (SC)
Kanpur Nagar	210	Bithoor
Kanpur Nagar	211	Kalyanpur
Kanpur Nagar	212	Govindnagar
Kanpur Nagar	213	Sishamau
Kanpur Nagar	214	Arya Nagar
Kanpur Nagar	215	Kidwai Nagar
Kanpur Nagar	216	Kanpur Cantt
Kanpur Nagar	217	Maharajpur
Kanpur Nagar	218	Ghatampur (SC)
Jalaun	219	Madhaugarh
Jalaun	220	Kalpi
Jalaun	221	Orai (SC)
Jhansi	222	Babina
Jhansi	223	Jhansi Nagar
Jhansi	224	Mauranipur (SC)
Jhansi	225	Garautha
Lalitpur	226	Lalitpur
Lalitpur	227	Mehroni (SC)
Hamirpur	228	Hamirpur
Hamirpur	229	Rath (SC)
Mahoba	230	Mahoba
Mahoba	231	Charkhari
Banda	232	Tindwari
Banda	233	Baberu
Banda	234	Naraini (SC)
Banda	235	Banda
Chitrakoot	236	Chitrakoot
Chitrakoot	237	Manikpur
Fatehpur	238	Jahanabad
Fatehpur	239	Bindki
Fatehpur	240	Fatehpur
Fatehpur	241	Ayah Shah
Fatehpur	242	Husainganj
Fatehpur	243	Khaga (SC)
Pratapgarh	244	Rampur Khas
Pratapgarh	245	Babaganj (SC)
Pratapgarh	246	Kunda
Pratapgarh	247	Bishwavnathganj
Pratapgarh	248	Pratapgarh
Pratapgarh	249	Patti
Pratapgarh	250	Raniganj
Kaushambi	251	Sirathu
Kaushambi	252	Manjhanpur (SC)
Kaushambi	253	Chail
Prayagraj	254	Phaphamau
Prayagraj	255	Soraon (SC)
Prayagraj	256	Phulpur
Prayagraj	257	Pratappur
Prayagraj	258	Handia
Prayagraj	259	Meja
Prayagraj	260	Karachhana
Prayagraj	261	Prayagraj West
Prayagraj	262	Prayagraj North
Prayagraj	263	Prayagraj South
Prayagraj	264	Bara (SC)
Prayagraj	265	Koraon
Barabanki	266	Kursi
Barabanki	267	Ram Nagar
Barabanki	268	Barabanki
Barabanki	269	Zaidpur (SC)
Barabanki	270	Dariyabad
Ayodhya	271	Rudauli
Barabanki	272	Haidergarh (SC)
Ayodhya	273	Milkipur (SC)
Ayodhya	274	Bikapur
Ayodhya	275	Ayodhya
Ayodhya	276	Goshainganj
Ambedkar Nagar	277	Katehari
Ambedkar Nagar	278	Tanda
Ambedkar Nagar	279	Alapur (SC)
Ambedkar Nagar	280	Jalalpur
Ambedkar Nagar	281	Akbarpur
Bahraich	282	Balha (SC)
Bahraich	283	Nanpara
Bahraich	284	Matera
Bahraich	285	Mahasi
Bahraich	286	Bahraich
Bahraich	287	Payagpur
Bahraich	288	Kaiserganj
Shravasti	289	Bhinga
Shravasti	290	Shrawasti
Balrampur	291	Tulsipur
Balrampur	292	Gainsari
Balrampur	293	Utraula
Balrampur	294	Balrampur (SC)
Gonda	295	Mehnaun
Gonda	296	Gonda
Gonda	297	Katra Bazar
Gonda	298	Colonelganj
Gonda	299	Tarabganj
Gonda	300	Mankapur (SC)
Gonda	301	Gaura
Siddharthnagar	302	Shohratgarh
Siddharthnagar	303	Kapilvastu (SC)
Siddharthnagar	304	Bansi
Siddharthnagar	305	Itwa
Siddharthnagar	306	Domariyaganj
Basti	307	Harraiya
Basti	308	Kaptanganj
Basti	309	Rudhauli
Basti	310	Basti Sadar
Basti	311	Mahadewa (SC)
Sant Kabir Nagar	312	Menhdawal
Sant Kabir Nagar	313	Khalilabad
Sant Kabir Nagar	314	Dhanghata (SC)
Maharajganj	315	Pharenda
Maharajganj	316	Nautanwa
Maharajganj	317	Siswa
Maharajganj	318	Maharajganj (SC)
Maharajganj	319	Paniyara
Gorakhpur	320	Caimpiyarganj
Gorakhpur	321	Pipraich
Gorakhpur	322	Gorakhpur Urban
Gorakhpur	323	Gorakhpur Rural
Gorakhpur	324	Sahajanwa
Gorakhpur	325	Khajani (SC)
Gorakhpur	326	Chauri-Chaura
Gorakhpur	327	Bansgaon (SC)
Gorakhpur	328	Chillupar
Kushinagar	329	Khadda
Kushinagar	330	Padrauna
Kushinagar	331	Tamkuhi Raj
Kushinagar	332	Fazilnagar
Kushinagar	333	Kushinagar
Kushinagar	334	Hata
Kushinagar	335	Ramkola (SC)
Deoria	336	Rudrapur
Deoria	337	Deoria
Deoria	338	Pathardeva
Deoria	339	Rampur Karkhana
Deoria	340	Bhatpar Rani
Deoria	341	Salempur (SC)
Deoria	342	Barhaj
Azamgarh	343	Atrauliya
Azamgarh	344	Gopalpur
Azamgarh	345	Sagri
Azamgarh	346	Mubarakpur
Azamgarh	347	Azamgarh
Azamgarh	348	Nizamabad
Azamgarh	349	Phoolpur Pawai
Azamgarh	350	Didarganj
Azamgarh	351	Lalganj (SC)
Azamgarh	352	Mehnagar (SC)
Mau	353	Madhuban
Mau	354	Ghosi
Mau	355	Muhammadabad-Gohna (SC)
Mau	356	Mau
Ballia	357	Belthara Road (SC)
Ballia	358	Rasara
Ballia	359	Sikanderpur
Ballia	360	Phephana
Ballia	361	Ballia Nagar
Ballia	362	Bansdih
Ballia	363	Bairia
Jaunpur	364	Badlapur
Jaunpur	365	Shahganj
Jaunpur	366	Jaunpur
Jaunpur	367	Malhani
Jaunpur	368	Mungra Badshahpur
Jaunpur	369	Machhlishahr (SC)
Jaunpur	370	Mariyahu
Jaunpur	371	Zafrabad
Jaunpur	372	Kerakat (SC)
Ghazipur	373	Jakhanian (SC)
Ghazipur	374	Saidpur (SC)
Ghazipur	375	Ghazipur Sadar
Ghazipur	376	Jangipur
Ghazipur	377	Zahoorabad
Ghazipur	378	Mohammadabad
Ghazipur	379	Zamania
Chandauli	380	Mughalsarai
Chandauli	381	Sakaldiha
Chandauli	382	Saiyadraja
Chandauli	383	Chakia (SC)
Varanasi	384	Pindra
Varanasi	385	Ajagara (SC)
Varanasi	386	Shivpur
Varanasi	387	Rohaniya
Varanasi	388	Varanasi North
Varanasi	389	Varanasi South
Varanasi	390	Varanasi Cantonment
Varanasi	391	Sevapuri
Bhadohi	392	Bhadohi
Bhadohi	393	Gyanpur
Bhadohi	394	Aurai (SC)
Mirzapur	395	Chhanbey (SC)
Mirzapur	396	Mirzapur
Mirzapur	397	Majhawan
Mirzapur	398	Chunar
Mirzapur	399	Marihan
Sonbhadra	400	Ghorawal
Sonbhadra	401	Robertsganj
Sonbhadra	402	Obra (ST)
Sonbhadra	403	Duddhi (ST)

=== Uttar Pradesh Legislative Council (Vidhan Parishad) ===
Main Article : Vidhan Parishad

The Uttar Pradesh Vidhan Parishad or the Uttar Pradesh Legislative Council is the upper house of the bicameral legislature of Uttar Pradesh state in northern India. Uttar Pradesh is one of the seven states in India, where the state legislature is bicameral, comprising two houses: the Vidhan Sabha (Legislative Assembly) and the Vidhan Parishad (Legislative Council). The Vidhan Parishad is a permanent House, consisting of 100 members.

==== History ====
The Uttar Pradesh Vidhan Parishad came into existence by the Government of India Act of 1935. The governor, Ram Naik, was a part of it. The Legislative Council consisted of 60 members. The term of a member of the council was nine years with one-third of its members retiring after every three years. The Houses enjoyed the right of electing their Presiding Officers known as the president. The first meeting of the legislative council was held on 29 July 1937. Sir Sitaram and Begum Aijaz Rasul were elected the president and the vice-president of the legislative council respectively. Sir Sitaram was in office till 9 March 1949. Chandra Bhal became the next chairman on 10 March 1949.

After the independence and adoption of the constitution on 26 January 1950 Chandra Bhal was re-elected the chairman of the legislative council and continued in office till 5 May 1958. Sri Nizamuddin was elected the deputy chairman of the council on 27 May 1952. He continued in office till 1964.

==== Nominations and election ====
When, under the provisions of the Government of India Act 1935, the legislative council came into existence in the United Provinces, it comprised 60 members. On 26 January 1950, the total membership of the Vidhan Parishad (legislative council) of Uttar Pradesh state was increased from 60 to 72. With the Constitution (Seventh Amendment) Act 1956, the strength of the council was enhanced to 108. After the reorganisation of Uttar Pradesh state in November 2000 and the creation of Uttarakhand state, this strength has now reduced to 100. The present composition of the Vidhan Parishad is as follows:

- 10 members are nominated by the governor of Uttar Pradesh.
- 38 members are elected by the Uttar Pradesh Vidhan Sabha members.
- 36 members are elected by the Local bodies.
- 8 members are elected by the teachers.
- 8 members are elected by the graduates.

==== Term ====
Members are now elected or nominated for six years and one-third of them retire every second year. The presiding officers of Vidhan Parishad are now known as chairman and deputy chairman. Mr. Ramesh Yadav is a chairman of this house at a time.

==== Constituencies and members ====
The following are the constituencies of the Uttar Pradesh Vidhan Parishad:

Graduates' constituencies (8)
#	Constituency	Member	Political Party	Term start	Term end
1	Bareilly–Moradabad	Jai Pal Singh	BJP	13-Feb-2023	12-Feb-2029
2	Gorakhpur–Faizabad	Devendra Pratap Singh	BJP	13-Feb-2023	12-Feb-2029
3	Kanpur	Arun Pathak	BJP	13-Feb-2023	12-Feb-2029
4	Agra	Manvendra Pratap Singh	BJP	01-Dec-2020	30-Nov-2026
5	Meerut	Dinesh Kumar Goel	BJP	01-Dec-2020	30-Nov-2026
6	Lucknow	Awanish Kumar Singh	BJP	01-Dec-2020	30-Nov-2026
7	Varanasi	Ashutosh Sinha	SP	01-Dec-2020	30-Nov-2026
8	Allahabad–Jhansi	Man Singh Yadav	SP	01-Dec-2020	30-Nov-2026

Teachers' constituencies (8)
#	Constituency	Member	Political Party	Term start	Term end
1	Kanpur	Raj Bahadur Singh Chandel	IND	13-Feb-2023	12-Feb-2029
2	Allahabad–Jhansi	Babu Lal Tiwari	BJP	13-Feb-2023	12-Feb-2029
3	Bareilly–Moradabad	Hari Singh Dhillon	BJP	01-Dec-2020	30-Nov-2026
4	Lucknow	Umesh Dwivedi	BJP	01-Dec-2020	30-Nov-2026
5	Varanasi	Lal Bihari Yadav	SP	01-Dec-2020	30-Nov-2026
6	Meerut	Shri Chand Sharma	BJP	01-Dec-2020	30-Nov-2026
7	Agra	Akash Agarwal	IND	01-Dec-2020	30-Nov-2026
8	Gorakhpur–Faizabad	Dhruv Kumar Tripathi	IND	01-Dec-2020	30-Nov-2026

Local Authorities' constituencies (36)
#	Constituency	Member	Political Party	Term start	Term end
1	Raebareli	Dinesh Pratap Singh	BJP	12-Apr-2022	11-Apr-2028
2	Jaunpur	Brijesh Singh	BJP	12-Apr-2022	11-Apr-2028
3	Muzaffarnagar- Saharanpur	Vandana Verma	BJP	12-Apr-2022	11-Apr-2028
4	Moradabad–Bijnor	Satyapal Saini	BJP	12-Apr-2022	11-Apr-2028
5	Rampur–Bareilly	Kunwar Maharaj Singh	BJP	12-Apr-2022	11-Apr-2028
6	Pilibhit–Shahjahanpur	Sudhir Gupta	BJP	12-Apr-2022	11-Apr-2028
7	Hardoi	Ashok Agrawal	BJP	12-Apr-2022	11-Apr-2028
8	Lakhimpur–Kheri	Anoop Kumar Gupta	BJP	12-Apr-2022	11-Apr-2028
9	Sitapur	Pawan Singh Chauhan	BJP	12-Apr-2022	11-Apr-2028
10	Lucknow–Unnao	Ram Chandra Pradhan	BJP	12-Apr-2022	11-Apr-2028
11	Pratapgarh	Akshay Pratap Singh	JSD(L)	12-Apr-2022	11-Apr-2028
12	Sultanpur	Shailendra Pratap Singh	BJP	12-Apr-2022	11-Apr-2028
13	Barabanki	Angad Singh	BJP	12-Apr-2022	11-Apr-2028
14	Bahraich	Pragya Tripathi	BJP	12-Apr-2022	11-Apr-2028
15	Gonda	Awadhesh Kumar Singh	BJP	12-Apr-2022	11-Apr-2028
16	Faizabad	Hariom Pandey	BJP	12-Apr-2022	11-Apr-2028
17	Basti–Siddharth Nagar	Subhash Yaduvansh	BJP	12-Apr-2022	11-Apr-2028
18	Gorakhpur–Maharajganj	C. P. Chand	BJP	12-Apr-2022	11-Apr-2028
19	Deoria	Ratanpal Singh	BJP	12-Apr-2022	11-Apr-2028
20	Azamgarh–Mau	Vikrant Singh "Rishu"	IND	12-Apr-2022	11-Apr-2028
21	Ballia	Ravishanker Singh	BJP	12-Apr-2022	11-Apr-2028
22	Mirzapur–Sonbhadra	Shyam Narayan Singh Alias Vineet Singh	BJP	12-Apr-2022	11-Apr-2028
23	Allahabad	K. P. Srivastav	BJP	12-Apr-2022	11-Apr-2028
24	Banda–Hamirpur	Jitendra Singh Sengar	BJP	12-Apr-2022	11-Apr-2028
25	Jhansi–Jalaun–Lalitpur	Rama Niranjan	BJP	12-Apr-2022	11-Apr-2028
26	Kanpur–Fatehpur	Avinash Singh Chauhan	BJP	12-Apr-2022	11-Apr-2028
27	Etawah–Farrukhabad	Pranshu Dutt Dwivedi	BJP	12-Apr-2022	11-Apr-2028
28	Agra–Firozabad	Vijay Shivhare	BJP	12-Apr-2022	11-Apr-2028
29	Mathura–Etah–Mainpuri	Ashish Kumar Yadav	BJP	12-Apr-2022	11-Apr-2028
30	Mathura–Etah–Mainpuri	Om Prakash Singh	BJP	12-Apr-2022	11-Apr-2028
31	Aligarh-Hathras	Chaudhary Rishipal Singh	BJP	12-Apr-2022	11-Apr-2028
32	Bulandshahar-Noida	Narendra Bhati	BJP	12-Apr-2022	11-Apr-2028
33	Meerut–Ghaziabad	Dharmendra Bhardwaj	BJP	12-Apr-2022	11-Apr-2028
34	Ghazipur	Vishal Singh Chanchal	BJP	12-Apr-2022	11-Apr-2028
35	Varanasi	Annapurna Singh	IND	12-Apr-2022	11-Apr-2028
36	Badaun	Vagish Pathak	BJP	12-Apr-2022	11-Apr-2028

Members elected by Legislative Assembly(38)
#	Member	Party	Term start	Term end
1	Vijay Bahadur Pathak	BJP	06-May-2024	05-May-2030
2	Mahendra Kumar Singh	BJP	06-May-2024	05-May-2030
3	Ashok Katariya	BJP	06-May-2024	05-May-2030
4	Santosh Singh	BJP	06-May-2024	05-May-2030
5	Dharmendra Singh	BJP	06-May-2024	05-May-2030
6	Ram Tirath Singhal	BJP	06-May-2024	05-May-2030
7	Mohit Beniwal	BJP	06-May-2024	05-May-2030
8	Keshav Prasad Maurya	BJP	06-Jul-2022	05-Jul-2028
9	Bhupendra Chaudhary	BJP	06-Jul-2022	05-Jul-2028
10	Daya Shankar Mishra	BJP	06-Jul-2022	05-Jul-2028
11	Jayendra Pratap Singh Rathore	BJP	06-Jul-2022	05-Jul-2028
12	Jaswant Singh Saini	BJP	06-Jul-2022	05-Jul-2028
13	Danish Azad Ansari	BJP	06-Jul-2022	05-Jul-2028
14	Narendra Kashyap	BJP	06-Jul-2022	05-Jul-2028
15	Manvendra Singh Chauhan	BJP	29-May-2023	05-Jul-2028
16	Mukesh Sharma	BJP	06-Jul-2022	05-Jul-2028
17	Bahoran Lal Maurya	BJP	06-Jul-2024	05-Jul-2028
18	Swatantra Dev Singh	BJP	31-Jan-2021	30-Jan-2027
19	A. K. Sharma	BJP	31-Jan-2021	30-Jan-2027
20	Kunwar Manvendra Singh	BJP	31-Jan-2021	30-Jan-2027
21	Govind Narayan Shukla	BJP	31-Jan-2021	30-Jan-2027
22	Salil Vishnoi	BJP	31-Jan-2021	30-Jan-2027
23	Ashwani Tyagi	BJP	31-Jan-2021	30-Jan-2027
24	Dharmveer Prajapati	BJP	31-Jan-2021	30-Jan-2027
25	Surendra Choudhary	BJP	31-Jan-2021	30-Jan-2027
26	Dharmendra Senthwar	BJP	11-Aug-2022	30-Jan-2027
27	Padmasen Chaudhary	BJP	29-May-2023	30-Jan-2027
28	Dara Singh Chauhan	BJP	23-Jan-2024	30-Jan-2027
29	Balram Yadav	SP	06-May-2024	05-May-2030
30	Shah Alam	SP	06-May-2024	05-May-2030
31	Kiranpal Kashyap	SP	06-May-2024	05-May-2030
32	Mukul Yadav	SP	06-Jul-2022	05-Jul-2028
33	Mohammad Jasmir Ansari	SP	06-Jul-2022	05-Jul-2028
34	Shahnawaz Khan	SP	06-Jul-2022	05-Jul-2028
35	Rajendra Chaudhary	SP	31-Jan-2021	30-Jan-2027
36	Ashish Patel	ADS	06-May-2024	05-May-2030
37	Yogesh Choudhary	RLD	06-May-2024	05-May-2030
38	Vichhelal Rajbhar	SBSP	06-May-2024	05-May-2030

Nominated members
#	Member	Party	Term start	Term end
1	Rajnikant Maheshwari	BJP	03-Apr-2023	02-Apr-2029
2	Saket Misra	BJP	03-Apr-2023	02-Apr-2029
3	Ram Surat Rajbhar	BJP	03-Apr-2023	02-Apr-2029
4	Hans Raj Vishwakarma	BJP	03-Apr-2023	02-Apr-2029
5	Tariq Mansoor	BJP	03-Apr-2023	02-Apr-2029
6	Lalaji Prasad Nirmal	BJP	03-Apr-2023	02-Apr-2029
7	Gopal Anjan Bhurji	BJP	01-Oct 2021	30-Sep-2027
8	Choudhary Virender Singh	BJP	01-Oct 2021	30-Sep-2027
9	Sanjay Nishad	NP	01-Oct 2021	30-Sep-2027
10	Vacant since 08-Jun-2024			30-Sep-2027

== Gallery ==
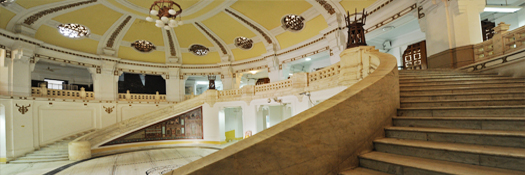
Inside of building towards central hall.

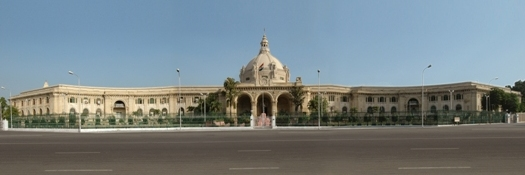
During Day

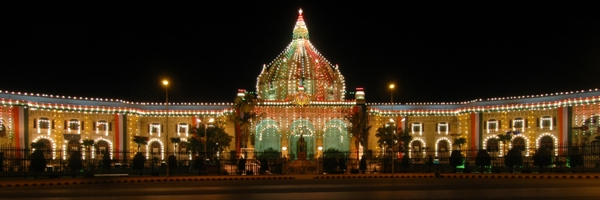
During Night

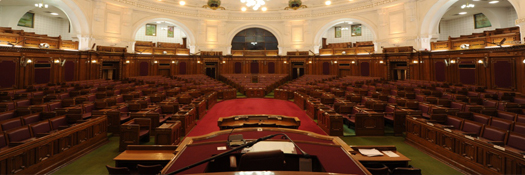
Vidhan Sabha Chamber
