= Dharmendra (disambiguation) =

Dharmendra (1935–2025) was an Indian actor, producer and politician.

Dharmendra (and variants) may also refer to:

- Dharmendra or Yama, lord of justice (from dharma (justice) + Indra (lord)) ; the Hindu god of death
- Dharminder or Dhar Mann (born 1984), Indian-American filmmaker
- Dharmendra Bhardwaj, Indian politician
- Dharmendra Bikram Nembang (born 1976), Nepalese poet
- Dharmendra Kashyap, Indian politician
- Dharmendra Kumar Singh Shakya, Indian politician
- Dharmendra Kumar Tyagi, Indian family planner
- Dharmendra Modha, Indian-American computer scientist
- Dharmender Phagna (born 1984), Indian cricketer
- Dharmendra Pradhan (born 1969), Indian politician
- Dharmendra Prasad Yadav, Indian politician
- Dharmendra Pratap Singh (born 1983), tallest living man in India
- Dharmender Rana, Indian judge
- Dharmendra Singh (born 1978), Indian cricketer
- Dharmendra Singh (politician), Indian politician
- Dharmender Singh Koli, Indian politician
- Dharmendra Singh Lodhi, Indian politician
- Dharmendra Singh Senthwar, Indian politician
- Dharmendra Singh Yadav (born 1972), Indian boxer
- Dharmendra Yadav (born 1979), Indian politician from Uttar Pradesh

== See also ==
- Dharmendrasinh Jadeja (born 1990), Indian cricketer
- Dharmendrasinh Vaghela, Indian politician
- Dharmendra antigen, test used in India
