= Shah Nawaz Khan =

Shah Nawaz Khan or Shahnawaz Khan may refer to:

== People ==
- Samsam ud Daula Shah Nawaz Khan (1700-1758), Indian courtier and historian
- Shah Nawaz Khan (Chief Justice), Pakistani judge
- Shah Nawaz Khan (general) (1914-1983), Indian army officer and politician
- Shah Nawaz Khan (Ghazni politician), Afghan representative from Ghazni to the Meshrano Jirga
- Shahnawaz Khan (Indian politician), member of Uttar Pradesh Legislative Council
- Shahnawaz Khan Mamdot (1883 – 1942), Punjabi landowner and politician of British India

== Places ==
- Shah Nawaz Khan, Punjab, a town in Okara District, Pakistan
- Shah Nawaz Khan metro station, Kolkata, India; named after the Indian general
