= Hansu Ram =

Member of Uttar Pradesh Legislative Assembly

Member of the Uttar Pradesh Legislative Assembly
- Incumbent
- Assumed office March 2022
- Preceded by: Dhananjay Kannoujia
- Constituency: Belthara Road

Personal details
- Born: 1 June 1955 (age 70) Azamgarh, Uttar Pradesh
- Party: Suheldev Bharatiya Samaj Party
- Spouse: Savita Devi
- Children: 6
- Parent: Lakhraj (father)
- Education: Master of Arts
- Alma mater: DDU Gorakhpur University
- Occupation: Politician, Farmer

Hansu Ram is an Indian politician, farmer, and a member of the 18th Uttar Pradesh Assembly from the Belthara Road Assembly constituency of Ballia. He is a member of the Suheldev Bharatiya Samaj Party.

== Early life ==
Hansu Ram was born on 1 January 1955 in Azamgarh, Uttar Pradesh, to a Hindu family of Lakhraj. He married Savita Devi on 1 May 1963, and they had six children.

== Education ==
Hansu Ram completed his Bachelor of Education at Mahatma Gandhi Post Graduate College, Gorakhpur, in 1977. Later, he joined Deen Dayal Upadhyay Gorakhpur University, Gorakhpur, where he completed a Master of Arts in political science in 1988.

== Posts held ==
#	From	To	Position	Comments
01	2022	Incumbent	Member, Uttar Pradesh Legislative Assembly	
