= Jagdish Narayan (politician) =

Member of Uttar Pradesh Legislative Assembly

Member of the Uttar Pradesh Legislative Assembly
- Incumbent
- Assumed office March 2022
- Preceded by: Harendra Prasad Singh
- Constituency: Zafrabad
- In office 1996–2002
- Constituency: Bayalsi
- In office 2002–2012
- Constituency: Beyalsi

Personal details
- Born: 11 April 1953 (age 72) Jaunpur, Uttar Pradesh
- Party: Suheldev Bharatiya Samaj Party
- Spouse: Geeta Rai
- Children: 4
- Parent: Durga Narayan (father)
- Education: Bachelor of Laws
- Alma mater: DDU Gorakhpur University
- Occupation: Politician, Farmer

Jagdish Narayan is an Indian politician, farmer, and a member of the 18th Uttar Pradesh Assembly from the Zafrabad Assembly constituency. He is a member of the Suheldev Bharatiya Samaj Party.

== Early life ==
Jagdish Narayan was born on 11 April 1953 in Jaunpur, Uttar Pradesh, to a Sanātanī Hindu family of Durga Narayan. He married Geeta Rai in 1968, and they have four children.

== Education ==
Jagdish Narayan completed his education with a Bachelor of Laws at Deen Dayal Upadhyay Gorakhpur University, Gorakhpur, in 1990.

== Posts held ==
#	From	To	Position	Comments
01	2022	Incumbent	Member, Uttar Pradesh Legislative Assembly	
