= Chairperson of the Uttar Pradesh Legislative Council =

Highest authority of the Legislative Council of Uttar Pradesh

Chairperson of Uttar Pradesh Legislative Council
- Seal of the Government of Uttar Pradesh

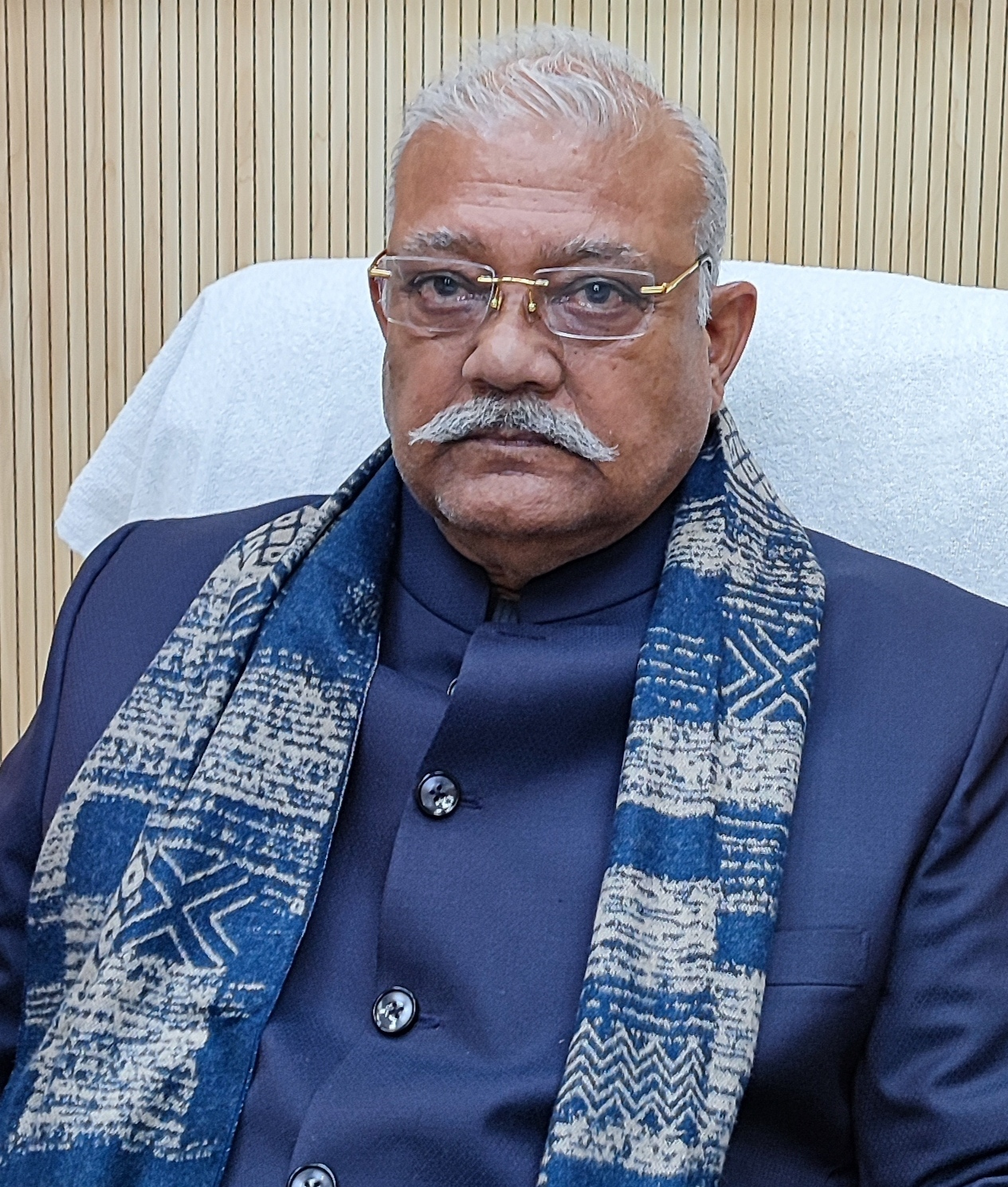
- Incumbent; Kunwar Manvendra Singh since 30 January 2021
- Style: The Honourable
- Type: Chairperson
- Status: Highest authority and presiding officer of the Legislative Council
- Member of: Uttar Pradesh Legislative Council
- Reports to: Government of Uttar Pradesh
- Residence: Lucknow
- Seat: Vidhan Bhavan, Lucknow
- Nominator: Members of the Legislative Council
- Term length: No limit
- Inaugural holder: Dr. Sir Sitaram
- Deputy: Deputy Chairperson of the Legislative Council

The chairperson of the Uttar Pradesh Legislative Council presides over the proceedings of the Uttar Pradesh Legislative Council. In the absence the deputy chairperson presides. The chairperson is elected internally by the Uttar Pradesh Legislative Council.

== Eligibility ==
The chairman of the Uttar Pradesh Legislative Council must:

1. Be a citizen of India.;
2. Be at least 25 years of age; and
3. Should not hold any office of profit under the Government of Uttar Pradesh.

== List of chair ==
The council is headed by a chairperson, elected by members in a simple majority vote. The following is the list of chairpersons of the council.

Sr No	Chairperson	Tenure		Party	Reference
1	Dr. Sir Sitaram	19 August 1925	12 March 1937	Indian National Congress	
2	Dr. Sir Sitaram	12 July 1937	9 March 1949	Indian National Congress	
3	Chandra Bhal	10 March 1949	25 January 1950	Indian National Congress	
4	Chandra Bhal	26 January 1950	5 May 1958	Indian National Congress	
5	Raghunath Vinayak Dhulekar	20 July 1958	5 May 1964	Indian National Congress	
6	Darbari Lal Sharma	5 August 1964	5 May 1968	Indian National Congress	
7	Virendra Swarup	15 March 1969	5 May 1974	Independent	
8	Virendra Swarup	11 June 1974	26 February 1980	Independent	
9	Virendra Bahadur SIngh Chandel	6 October 1980	5 May 1982	Indian National Congress	
10	Virendra Bahadur SIngh Chandel	3 March 1983	5 May 1988	Indian National Congress	
11	Jagdish Chandra Dikshit	6 April 1989	7 March 1990	Indian National Congress	
12	Shiv Prasad Gupta	5 July 1990	5 July 1992	Bharatiya Janata Party	
13	Nityanand Swami	25 April 1997	8 November 2000	Indian National Congress	
14	Sukhram Singh Yadav	3 August 2004	15 January 2010	Samajwadi Party	
15	Ganesh Shankar Pandey	21 January 2010	15 January 2016	Bahujan Samaj Party	
16	Ramesh Yadav	11 March 2016	30 January 2021	Samajwadi Party	
17	Kunwar Manvendra Singh	30 January 2021	present	Bharatiya Janata Party	
