= Zafrabad Assembly constituency =

Constituency of the Uttar Pradesh legislative assembly in India

Coordinates: 25.70°N 82.73°E

Zafrabad
- Constituency No. 371 for the Uttar Pradesh Legislative Assembly

Constituency details
- Country: India
- Region: North India
- State: Uttar Pradesh
- District: Jaunpur
- Total electors: 3,98,511
- Reservation: None

Member of Legislative Assembly
- 18th Uttar Pradesh Legislative Assembly
- Incumbent Jagdish Narayan
- Party: SBSP
- Alliance: NDA
- Elected year: 2022
- Preceded by: Harendra Prasad Singh

Zafrabad is a constituency of the Uttar Pradesh Legislative Assembly covering the city of Zafrabad in the Jaunpur district of Uttar Pradesh, India.

Zafrabad is one of five assembly constituencies in the Machhlishahr Lok Sabha constituency. Since 2008, this assembly constituency is numbered 371 amongst 403 constituencies.

== Members of the Legislative Assembly ==
Year	Member	Party
Till 2012 : Constituency did not exist
2012	Sachindra Nath Tripathi	Samajwadi Party
2017	Harendra Prasad Singh	Bharatiya Janata Party
2022	Jagadish Narayan	Suheldev Bharatiya Samaj Party

== Election results ==
=== 2027 ===
2027 Uttar Pradesh Legislative Assembly election: Zafrabad
Party	Candidate	Votes	%	±%
INDIA				
NDA				
BSP				
NOTA	None of the above			
Majority				
Turnout				
gain from		Swing		

=== 2022 ===
2022 Uttar Pradesh Legislative Assembly election: Zafrabad
Party	Candidate	Votes	%	±%
SBSP	Jagadish Narayan	90,620	40.57	
BJP	Harendra Prasad Singh	84,328	37.76	−3.89
BSP	Dr. Santosh Mishra	35,234	15.78	−6.25
Independent	Abhishek Singh (Sonu)	3,786	1.7	
Jan Adhikar Party	Brijesh Kumar	2,656	1.19	
INC	Lakshmi Nagar	2,235	1.0	
NOTA	None of the above	1,550	0.69	+0.11
Majority		6,292	2.81	−9.23
Turnout		223,351	56.05	−0.02
SBSP gain from BJP		Swing		

=== 2017 ===
Bharatiya Janta Party candidate Dr. Harendra Prasad Singh won in 2017 Uttar Pradesh Legislative Elections defeating Samajwadi Party candidate Sachindra Nath Tripathi by a margin of 24,865 votes.

2017 Uttar Pradesh Legislative Assembly Election: Zafrabad
Party	Candidate	Votes	%	±%
BJP	Harendra Prasad Singh	85,989	41.65	
SP	Shachindra Nath Tripathi	61,124	29.61	
BSP	Sanjiv Kuamr Upadhyay	45,490	22.03	
CPI	Jai Prakash	2,845	1.38	
NOTA	None of the above	1,198	0.58	
Majority		24,865	12.04	
Turnout		206,451	56.07	
