= Mudit =

Mudit can be a given name or a middle name. Notable people with the name include:

- Mudit Ganguly, Indian-Canadian drag performer
- Mudit Nayar, Indian actor
- Vandana Mudit Verma, Indian politician
