= Rashtriya Dal =

Defunct political party in India

Rashtriya Dal ('National Party') was a faction formed in 1960 by the teachers' representatives in the Uttar Pradesh Legislative Council, India. At the time, the Legislative Council had 12 teachers as members, as well as 4 former teachers. Rashtriya Dal was recognized by the speaker as a Legislative Council group. However, it was disbanded within a year, and the teachers' representatives were split along partisan lines.
