= Angad Singh =

Angad Singh may refer to:

- Angad Singh (INC politician)
- Angad Singh (BJP politician)
