= Mukesh Sharma (disambiguation) =

Mukesh Sharma (born 1981) is an Indian politician who served as a member of the Uttar Pradesh Legislative Assembly from 2012 to 2017

Mukesh Sharma may also refer to:

- Mukesh Sharma (Delhi politician), (born 1965)
- Mukesh Sharma (Uttar Pradesh Legislative Council member)
- Mukesh Sharma (Haryana politician)
