= Belthara Road Assembly constituency =

Constituency of the Uttar Pradesh legislative assembly in India

Coordinates: 26.13°N 83.85°E

Belthara Road
- Constituency No. 357 for the Uttar Pradesh Legislative Assembly

Constituency details
- Country: India
- Region: North India
- State: Uttar Pradesh
- District: Ballia
- Reservation: SC

Member of Legislative Assembly
- 18th Uttar Pradesh Legislative Assembly
- Incumbent Hansu Ram
- Party: SBSP
- Alliance: NDA
- Elected year: 2022

Belthara Road is a constituency of the Uttar Pradesh Legislative Assembly covering the city of Belthara Road in the Ballia district of Uttar Pradesh, India.

Belthara Road is one of five assembly constituencies in the Lok Sabha constituency of Salempur. Since 2008, this assembly constituency is numbered 357 amongst 403 constituencies.

== Members of Legislative Assembly ==
Year	Member	Party
Till 2012 : Constituency did not exist
2012	Gorakh Paswan	Samajwadi Party
2017	Dhananjay Kannoujia	Bharatiya Janata Party
2022	Hansu Ram	Suheldev Bharatiya Samaj Party

== Election results ==
=== 2027 ===
2027 Uttar Pradesh Legislative Assembly election: Belthara
Party	Candidate	Votes	%	±%
INDIA				
NDA				
BSP				
NOTA	None of the above			
Majority				
Turnout				
gain from		Swing		

=== 2022 ===
2022 Uttar Pradesh Legislative Assembly election: Belthara Road
Party	Candidate	Votes	%	±%
SBSP	Hansu Ram	78,995	39.57	
BJP	Chhattu Ram	73,481	36.81	−4.01
BSP	Praveen Prakash	38,803	19.44	−5.47
Jan Adhikar Party	Ramlal	2,093	1.05	+0.94
NOTA	None of the above	1,219	0.61	−0.08
Majority		5,514	2.76	−6.89
Turnout		199,617	55.72	−1.33
SBSP gain from BJP		Swing		

=== 2017 ===
Bharatiya Janta Party candidate Dhananjay Kannoujia won in last Assembly election of 2017 Uttar Pradesh Legislative Elections defeating Samajwadi Party candidate Gorakh Paswan by a margin of 18,319 votes.

2017 Uttar Pradesh Legislative Assembly Election: Belthara Roa
Party	Candidate	Votes	%	±%
BJP	Dhananjay Kannoujia	77,504	40.82	
SP	Gorakh Paswan	59,185	31.17	
BSP	Ghoora Ram	47,297	24.91	
NOTA	None of the above	1,305	0.69	
Majority		18,319	9.65	
Turnout		189,878	57.05	
