= Triveni Ram =

Indian politician

Member of Uttar Pradesh Legislative Assembly
- In office 2017–2022
- Preceded by: Subba Ram
- Succeeded by: Bedi Ram
- Constituency: Jakhanian, Ghazipur district

Personal details
- Born: March 25, 1968 (age 58)
- Party: Suheldev Bharatiya Samaj Party
- Occupation: MLA
- Profession: Politician

Triveni Ram is an Indian politician and former member of the Uttar Pradesh Legislative Assembly. He was a member of 17th Uttar Pradesh Assembly from 19 March 2017 to 12 March 2022, representing the Jakhanian Assembly constituency in the Ghazipur district of Uttar Pradesh. He is a member of the Suheldev Bharatiya Samaj Party.

== Political career ==
Ram was a member of the 17th Uttar Pradesh Assembly, representing the Jakhanian Assembly constituency as a member of the Suheldev Bharatiya Samaj Party (SBSP). He was not a candidate in the 2022 Uttar Pradesh Legislative Assembly elections, with the SBSP instead fielding Bedi Ram, who won the elections.

== Posts held ==
#	From	To	Position	Comments
01	2017	2022	Member, 17th Legislative Assembly	

== See also ==
- Uttar Pradesh Legislative Assembly
