= Jakhanian Assembly constituency =

Constituency of the Uttar Pradesh legislative assembly in India

Coordinates: 25.74°N 83.37°E

Jakhanian
- Constituency No. 373 for the Uttar Pradesh Legislative Assembly

Constituency details
- Country: India
- Region: North India
- State: Uttar Pradesh
- District: Ghazipur
- Total electors: 4,32,337
- Reservation: SC

Member of Legislative Assembly
- 18th Uttar Pradesh Legislative Assembly
- Incumbent Bedi Ram
- Party: SBSP
- Alliance: NDA
- Elected year: 2022

Jakhanian is a constituency of the Uttar Pradesh Legislative Assembly covering the city of Jakhanian in the Ghazipur district of Uttar Pradesh, India.

Jakhanian is one of five assembly constituencies in the Ghazipur Lok Sabha constituency. Since 2008, this assembly constituency is numbered 373 amongst 403 constituencies.

== Members of the Legislative Assembly ==
Year	Member	Party
1967	Deo Ram	Indian National Congress
1969	Deo Ram	Indian National Congress
1974	Jhilmit Ram	Bharatiya Kranti Dal
1977	Deo Ram	Janata Party
1980	Jhilmit Ram	Indian National Congress (I)
1984^	Chhedi Ram	Janata Party (Secular)
1985	Jhilmit Ram	Indian National Congress
1989	Rajnath Sonkar Shastri	Janata Dal
1991	Girdhari	Janata Dal
1993	Chandra Shekhar	Bahujan Samaj Party
1996	Vijay Kumar	Bahujan Samaj Party
2002	Chhedi Ram	Samajwadi Party
2007	Vijay Kumar	Bahujan Samaj Party
2012	Subba Ram	Samajwadi Party
2017	Triveni Ram	Suheldev Bharatiya Samaj Party
2022	Bedi Ram	Suheldev Bharatiya Samaj Party

== Election results ==
=== 2027 ===
2027 Uttar Pradesh Legislative Assembly election: Jakhanian
Party	Candidate	Votes	%	±%
INDIA				
NDA				
BSP				
NOTA	None of the above			
Majority				
Turnout				
gain from		Swing		

=== 2022 ===
2022 Uttar Pradesh Legislative Assembly election: Jakhanian
Party	Candidate	Votes	%	±%
SBSP	Bedi Ram	113,378	44.53	+9.54
BJP	Ramraj Vanvasi (Mushar)	76,513	30.05	
BSP	Vijay Kumar	51,585	20.26	−7.63
NOTA	None of the above	1,544	0.61	−0.16
Majority		36,865	14.48	+12.33
Turnout		254,608	58.89	−1.32
SBSP hold		Swing		

=== 2017 ===
Suheldev Bharatiya Samaj Party candidate Triveni Ram won in 2017 Uttar Pradesh Legislative Elections defeating Samajwadi Party candidate Gareeb by a margin of 5,157 votes.

2017 Uttar Pradesh Legislative Assembly Election: Jakhania
Party	Candidate	Votes	%	±%
SBSP	Triveni Ram	84,158	34.99	
SP	Gareeb	79,001	32.84	
BSP	Sanjiv Kumar	67,077	27.89	
NCP	Keshnath Prasad	2,368	0.98	
NOTA	None of the above	1,837	0.77	
Majority		5,157	2.15	
Turnout		240,534	60.21	
