= Vijay Bahadur Pathak =

Indian politician

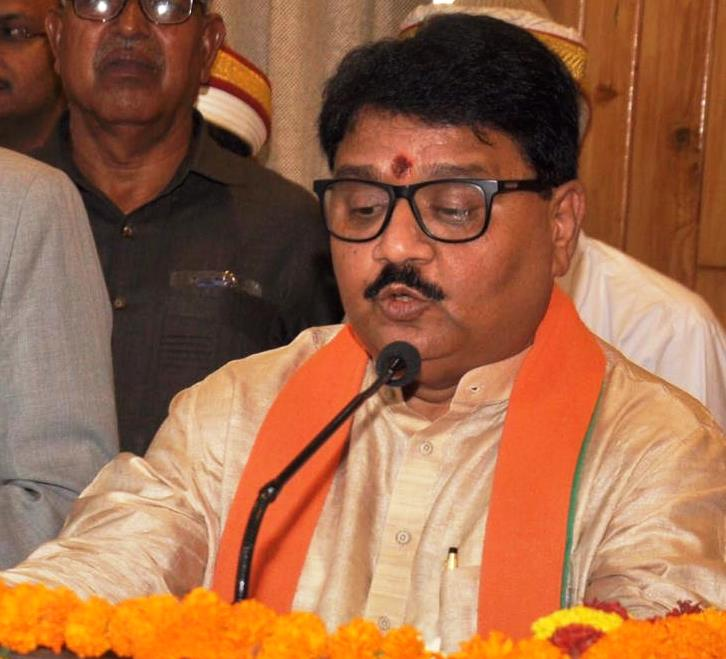

Member of the Uttar Pradesh Legislative Council
- Incumbent
- Assumed office 6 May 2018
- Preceded by: Akhilesh Yadav
- Constituency: elected by Legislative Assembly members

Personal details
- Born: 1 January 1968 (age 58) Azamgarh, Uttar Pradesh, India
- Party: Bharatiya Janata Party – (State Vice President, BJP UP & State In-charge of Panchayat Chunav- 2021) Executive Chairman of Privilege Committee, Vidhan Parishad, UP
- Spouse: Smt. Pratima Pathak
- Children: 2 sons (Vrishank Pathak, Vibhav Pathak)
- Profession: Politician

Vijay Bahadur Pathak is an Indian politician from the state of Uttar Pradesh who is a leader of Bharatiya Janta Party and State Vice President of UP State BJP. He is also a consecutively Second Time member of the Uttar Pradesh Legislative Council.

== Early life ==
Pathak was born in a middle-class Brahmin family. He is associated with a political family. 1 January 1968, his father Shri Radheshyam Pathak (a RSS activist) was the candidate of Bhartiya Jana Sangh.

== Political career ==
In 1986, Pathak was the president of Bharatiya Janata Yuva Morcha of Azamgarh city unit . In 1987, he was elected as president of Student union of Shri Durga Ji Graduate College, Chandeshwar Azamgarh. In 1988, he was the member of State Working Committee of the Bharatiya Janata Yuva Morcha Uttar Pradesh. In 1989, he was made political secretary to Shri Kalraj MishraJi. In 1990, he was made State Secretary Bharatiya Janata Yuva Morcha, Uttar Pradesh. He played a key role in the conduct of political activities while staying at BJP headquarters during the Ram Janmabhoomi movement. He became member of BJP Uttar Pradesh Working Committee from 1994. In 1997, he was Public Relations Officer of Shri Kalraj MishraJi, Minister of Uttar Pradesh Government. In 1998 he became the Vice President of Uttar Pradesh Olympics Association . He was made State Media Incharge of BJP in 2000. He also contested In 2002 Uttar Pradesh Legislative Assembly election for BJP from Nizamabad Vidhan Sabha Constituency. In 2005 he became the party spokesman. He also became the joint secretary of the Archery Association and President of Azamgarh Olympic Association. He was given the responsibility of the State Spokesperson of the Bharatiya Janta Party Uttar Pradesh state unit on 2 August 2010. He was appointed State general secretary for BJP Uttar Pradesh on 9 July 2016. On 9 February 2018 he was re-elected as State general secretary. On 19 April 2018 he was elected as the Member of Uttar Pradesh Legislative Council, 22 August 2020 Working As a Vice President of Bharatiya Janta Party Uttar Pradesh Uttar Pradesh. On 6 May 2024 he was re-elected asas the Member of Uttar Pradesh Legislative Council.
