= Kunwar Manvendra Singh =

Chairman of the Uttar Pradesh Legislative Council since 2021

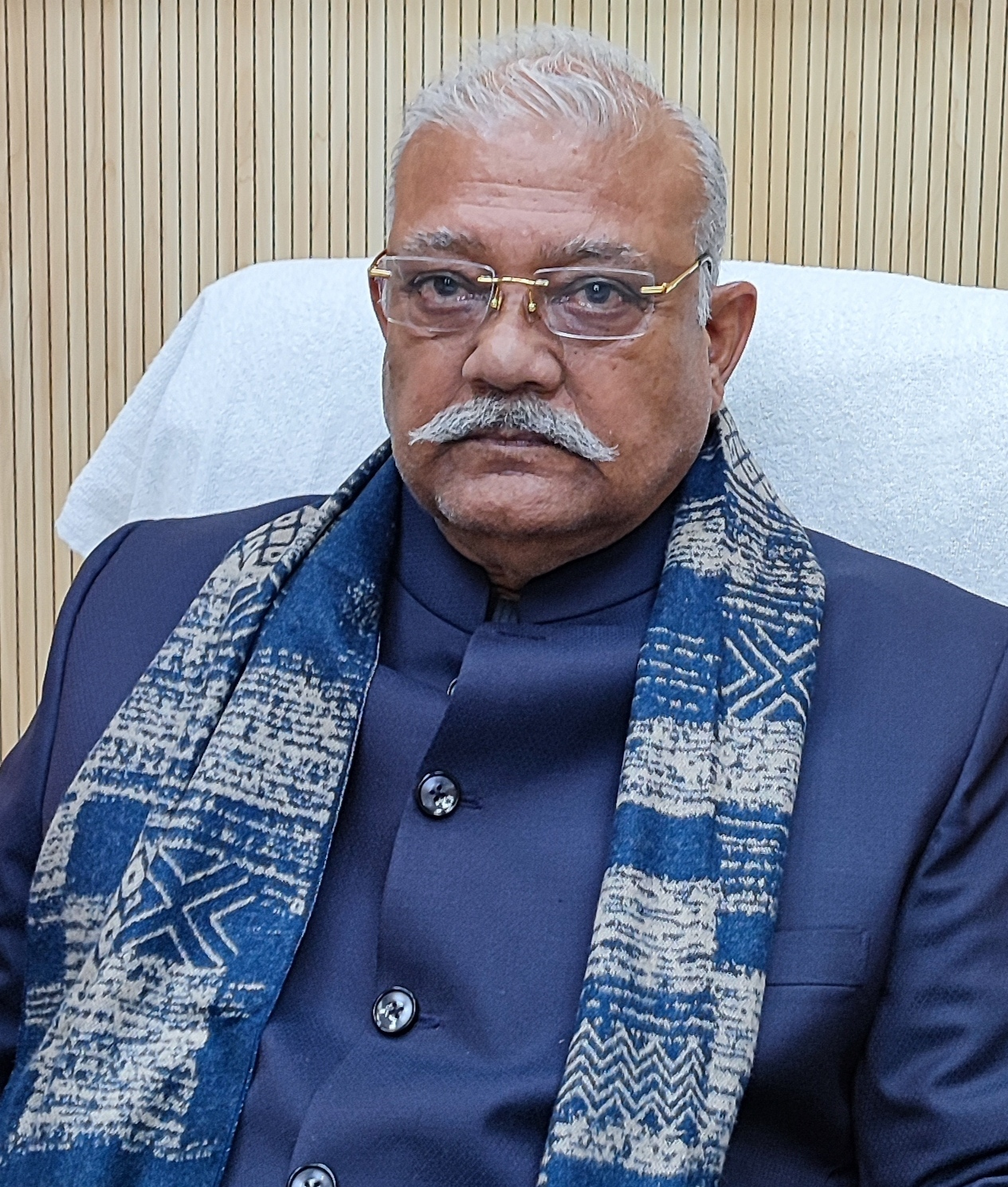
- Singh in 2022

Chairperson of the Uttar Pradesh Legislative Council
- Incumbent
- Assumed office 30 January 2021
- Governor: Anandiben Patel
- Preceded by: Ramesh Yadav

Deputy Chairperson of the Uttar Pradesh Legislative Council
- In office 6 August 2004 – 5 May 2006
- Governor: T. V. Rajeswar

Pro tem Chairperson of Uttar Pradesh Legislative Council
- In office 6 June 2002 – 2 August 2004
- Governor: Vishnu Kant Shastri

Member of Uttar Pradesh Legislative Council
- Incumbent
- Assumed office 1 December 2020
- Constituency: Elected by the MLAs
- In office 6 May 2000 – 5 May 2006
- Constituency: Elected by the MLAs
- In office 19 May 1990 – 18 May 1996
- Constituency: Jhansi-Jalaun-Lalitpur Local Authorities

Member of Uttar Pradesh Legislative Assembly
- In office 10 March 1985 – 29 November 1989
- Preceded by: Ranjeet Singh Judeo
- Succeeded by: Ranjeet Singh Judeo
- Constituency: Garautha

Personal details
- Born: 15 November 1952 (age 73) Agra, Uttar Pradesh, India
- Party: Bharatiya Janata Party
- Spouse: Kausalya Singh (m. 1982)
- Children: 2 (sons)
- Education: M.A, LL.B Lucknow University
- Occupation: Politician

Kunwar Manvendra Singh (born 15 November 1952) is an Indian politician belonging to the Bharatiya Janata Party currently serving as the Chair of Uttar Pradesh Legislative Council.

== Early life ==
He was born in Agra in 1952 to Kunwar Yogendra Singh & Lata Devi. He has been associated with the RSS since 1969. He later married in 1982 and has two sons. He also holds a MA and a LLB degree from Lucknow University.

== Political career ==
He has been associated with Sangh and Vidyarthi Parishad since his early days.

He was elected district president of the BJP-Jhansi Unit. He was elected to the legislative assembly of Uttar Pradesh once in the elections held in 1985, and three times as a member of the Legislative Council. He has served as the Chairman of Uttar Pradesh Jal Vidyut Nigam from 1997 to 2000 and later as the Chairman of Bundelkhand Vikas Board from 2019 to 2021 during the present tenure of Sri Yogi Adityanath as Chief Minister. He had previously been the acting chairman of the council from May 2002 to August 2004. He was also elected as Deputy Chairman Legislative Council, U.P. from August 2004 to 5 May 2006. On 21 January 2021, he was elected unopposed with 11 other candidates to the Uttar Pradesh Legislative Council.
