= Shailendra Pratap Singh =

Indian politician

Member of Uttar Pradesh Legislative Council
- Incumbent
- Assumed office 2016
- Constituency: Sultanpur Local Authorities
- In office 1990–2010
- Constituency: Sultanpur Local Authorities

Personal details
- Party: Bharatiya Janata Party (2022- current)
- Other political affiliations: Samajwadi Party (2016- 2022)
- Profession: Politician

Shailendra Pratap Singh is an Indian politician who is currently serving as the member of the Uttar Pradesh Legislative Council since 2016 from Sultanpur Local Authority Constituencies. He is a party member of the Bharatiya Janata Party.

== Political career ==
Singh previously held 4 times MLC position from the same local authority constituencies and was formerly affiliated with Samajwadi Party.

Singh is a member of the "Parliamentary and Social Harmony Committee".

== See also ==
- Uttar Pradesh Legislative Council
- Uttar Pradesh Legislative Assembly
- Member of Parliament, Lok Sabha
