= Ashwani Tyagi =

Indian politician

Member of the Uttar Pradesh Legislative Council
- Incumbent
- Assumed office 31 Jan 2021
- Constituency: elected by Legislative assembly members

Personal details
- Political party: Bhartiya Janata Party

Ashwani Tyagi is an Indian politician from the Bharatiya Janata Party. He is serving as a member of the Uttar Pradesh Legislative Council and President of the western area of Bharatiya Janata Party, Uttar Pradesh.
