= Rajendra Chaudhary (Uttar Pradesh politician) =

Indian politician

Member (MLC) of Uttar Pradesh Legislative Council
- Incumbent
- Assumed office 31 January 2021
- Constituency: elected by Legislative Assembly members
- In office 2012–2018
- Constituency: elected by Legislative Assembly members

Member (MLA) of Uttar Pradesh Legislative Assembly
- In office 1977–1980
- Preceded by: Pyare Lal
- Succeeded by: Surendra Kumar
- Constituency: Ghaziabad

Personal details
- Born: Kotgaon village, Ghaziabad district, Uttar Pradesh
- Political party: Samajwadi Party
- Spouse: unmarried
- Parent: Amrit Singh (father)
- Education: BA-LLB; MA (Economics)

Rajendra Chaudhary is a politician in Uttar Pradesh, India, belonging to the Samajwadi Party, who currently serves as Member of Legislative Council since 2021. He is the Chief Spokesperson of the Samajwadi Party in Uttar Pradesh, and also additionally serves as the party’s state incharge of Uttarakhand.

Chaudhary served as a Member of the Uttar Pradesh Legislative Assembly in the year 1978 from Bharatiya Kranti Dal, headed by the former Prime Minister Chaudhary Charan Singh, and became the chairperson of UP Agro in 1992. He also served as the Minister of Science and Technology under the Samajwadi Party in the year 2002.

In 2012 he was nominated as the MLC from Uttar Pradesh along with Akhilesh Yadav, and in February 2013 he was appointed a Cabinet Minister in the Akhilesh Yadav ministry. He holds the portfolios for the Jail Ministry and the Food & Civil Supplies Department.
