= Lalaji Prasad Nirmal =

Indian politician

Member of Uttar Pradesh Legislative Council
- Incumbent
- Assumed office April 2023
- Nominated by: Governor of Uttar Pradesh
- Governor: Anandiben Patel
- Chief Minister: Yogi Adityanath

Personal details
- Party: Bharatiya Janata Party

Lalaji Prasad Nirmal is an Indian politician from the state of Uttar Pradesh, Currently he is serving as member of Uttar Pradesh Legislative Council. Previously he has also served as chairman of Uttar Pradesh Scheduled Castes Finance and Development Corporation. He is affiliated with the Bharatiya Janata Party. He is also serving as the President of Baba Saheb Dr. Bhimrao Ambedkar Mahasabha.

== Political career ==
Post's Held	From	To
Member of Uttar Pradesh Legislative Council	April 2023	Incumbent
Chairman of Uttar Pradesh Scheduled Castes Finance and Development Corporation	April 2018	N/A
Chairman of Bharat Ratna Dr. Ambedkar Cultural Centre	N/A	N/A
