= Chaudhary Rishipal Singh =

Indian politician

Member of Uttar Pradesh Legislative Council
- Incumbent
- Assumed office 12 April 2022
- Constituency: Aligarh-Hathras

Personal details
- Party: Bharatiya Janata Party
- Profession: Politician

Chaudhary Rishipal Singh is an Indian politician who is currently serving as a member of the Uttar Pradesh Legislative Council and a party member of the Bharatiya Janata Party. He was elected as MLC from Aligarh-Hathras of Local Authority Constituencies.
