= Vandana Mudit Verma =

Indian politician

- वंदना मुदित वर्मा

Member of the Uttar Pradesh Legislative Council

Personal details
- Party: Bhartiya Janata Party

Vandana Mudit Verma is an Indian politician and member of the Uttar Pradesh Legislative Council. She represents the constituency Muzaffarnagar Saharanpur. She is a member of the member of the Bharatiya Janata Party.

== Education and Political career ==
Vandana Verma is from Kutubpur Meerapur village in the Muzaffarnagar district of Uttar Pradesh. She holds a Master's degree and previously served as the Chairman of a Cooperative Bank. Upon being elected as a Member of the Legislative Council (MLC), Verma pledged to focus on the development of the common people in her constituency. She is committed to implementing and promoting the women-focused schemes of the BJP-led Narendra Modi government at the grassroots level.
