= Uttar Pradesh Legislative Council =

Upper house of the bicameral legislature of the state of Uttar Pradesh

Uttar Pradesh Legislative Council Uttar Pradesh Vidhan Parishad

Type
- Type: Upper house of the Uttar Pradesh Legislature
- Term limits: 6 years

Leadership
- Governor of Uttar Pradesh: Anandiben Patel since 29 July 2019
- Chairperson: Kunwar Manvendra Singh, BJP since 31 January 2021
- Leader of the House: Keshav Prasad Maurya, BJP since 10 August 2022
- Leader of Opposition: Lal Bihari Yadav, SP since 22 July 2024
- Deputy Leader of Opposition: Mohammad Jasmir Ansari, SP since 22 July 2024
- Principal Secretary: Dr Rajesh Singh, IAS

Structure
- Seats: 100 (90 elected + 10 nominated)
- Political groups: Government (83) NDA (83): BJP (79); AD(S) (1); NISHAD (1); RLD (1); SBSP (1); Official Opposition (12) SP+ (12): SP (12); Other opposition (4): JSD(L) (1); IND (3)

Elections
- Last election: 2026
- Next election: 2027

Meeting place
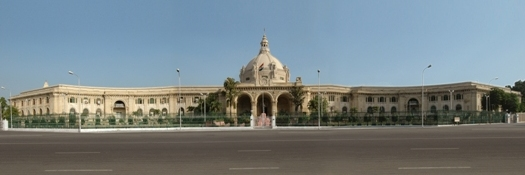
- Vidhan Parishad Chamber, Vidhan Bhavan, Vidhan Sabha Marg, Lucknow - 226 001

Website
- Uttar Pradesh Legislative Council

The Uttar Pradesh Legislative Council, is the upper house of the bicameral legislature of Uttar Pradesh, a state in India. Uttar Pradesh is one of the six states in India, where the state legislature is bicameral, comprising two houses: the Legislative Assembly and the Legislative Council. The Legislative Council is a permanent house, consisting of 100 members.

== History ==
The Uttar Pradesh Legislative Assembly came into existence by the Government of India Act of 1935. The Legislative Council consisted of 60 members. The term of a member of the Council was six years with one-third of its members retiring after every two years. The Houses enjoyed the right of electing their Presiding Officers known as the President. The first meeting of the Legislative Council was held on 29 July 1937. Sir Sitaram and Begum Aizaz Rasul were elected the President and the Vice-President of the Legislative Council respectively. Sir Sitaram was in office until 9 March 1949. Chandra Bhal became the next Chairman on 10 March 1949.

After the independence and adoption of the constitution on 26 January 1950 Chandra Bhal was re-elected the Chairman of the Legislative Council and served until 5 May 1958. Sri Nizamuddin was elected the Deputy Chairman of the Council on 27 May 1952. He served until 1964.

== Nominations and election ==
When, under the provisions of the Government of India Act 1935, the Legislative Council came into existence in the United Provinces, it comprised 60 members. On 26 January 1950, the total membership of the legislative council of Uttar Pradesh state was increased from 60 to 72. With the Constitution (Seventh Amendment) Act 1956, the strength of the Council was enhanced to 108. After the reorganization of Uttar Pradesh state in November 2000 and the creation of Uttarakhand state, this strength has now reduced to 100.

=== Composition of Legislative Council ===
The present composition of the Legislative Council is as follows:

Uttar Pradesh Legislative Council has 100 members (MLC).

- 38 members are elected by the Uttar Pradesh Legislative Assembly members (MLA).
- 36 members are elected by local authorities.
- 8 members are elected by graduates.
- 8 members are elected by teachers.
- 10 members are nominated by the Governor of Uttar Pradesh.

=== Party composition ===
Alliance	Party	No. of MLCs	Leader of the party in Council
NDA; Seats: 83	BJP	79	Keshav Prasad Maurya (Leader of the House)
NDA; Seats: 83	AD(S)	1	Ashish Singh Patel
NDA; Seats: 83	NISHAD	1	Sanjay Nishad
NDA; Seats: 83	RLD	1	Yogesh Choudhary
NDA; Seats: 83	SBSP	1	Vichhelal Rajbhar
SP+ Seats: 12	SP	12	Lal Bihari Yadav (Leader of the Opposition)
Others; Seats: 4	JSD(L)	1	Akshay Pratap Singh
Others; Seats: 4	IND	3	—
Vacant		1	
Total number of MLCs		100	

== Term ==
Members are now elected or nominated for six years and one-third of them retire on the expiration of every second year, so a member continues as such for six years. The vacant seats are filled up by fresh elections and nominations (by Governor) at the beginning of every third year. The retiring members are also eligible for re-election and re-nomination any number of times. The Presiding Officers of Legislative Council are Chairman and Deputy Chairman. Kunwar Manvendra Singh is the current Chairman of the Uttar Pradesh Legislative Council.

== Constituencies and members (100) ==
See List of members of the Uttar Pradesh Legislative Council

The following are the constituencies of the Uttar Pradesh Legislative Council:

=== Elected by Legislative Assembly (38) ===
Keys: BJP (28) AD(S) (1) RLD (1) SBSP (1) SP (7)

#	Member	Party	Alliance	Term start	Term end
1	Vijay Bahadur Pathak	BJP	NDA	06-May-2024	05-May-2030
2	Mahendra Kumar Singh	BJP	NDA	06-May-2024	05-May-2030
3	Ashok Katariya	BJP	NDA	06-May-2024	05-May-2030
4	Santosh Singh	BJP	NDA	06-May-2024	05-May-2030
5	Dharmendra Singh	BJP	NDA	06-May-2024	05-May-2030
6	Ram Tirath Singhal	BJP	NDA	06-May-2024	05-May-2030
7	Mohit Beniwal	BJP	NDA	06-May-2024	05-May-2030
8	Keshav Prasad Maurya	BJP	NDA	06-Jul-2022	05-Jul-2028
9	Bhupendra Chaudhary	BJP	NDA	06-Jul-2022	05-Jul-2028
10	Daya Shankar Mishra	BJP	NDA	06-Jul-2022	05-Jul-2028
11	Jayendra Pratap Singh Rathore	BJP	NDA	06-Jul-2022	05-Jul-2028
12	Jaswant Singh Saini	BJP	NDA	06-Jul-2022	05-Jul-2028
13	Danish Azad Ansari	BJP	NDA	06-Jul-2022	05-Jul-2028
14	Narendra Kashyap	BJP	NDA	06-Jul-2022	05-Jul-2028
15	Manvendra Singh Chauhan	BJP	NDA	29-May-2023	05-Jul-2028
16	Mukesh Sharma	BJP	NDA	06-Jul-2022	05-Jul-2028
17	Bahoran Lal Maurya	BJP	NDA	06-Jul-2024	05-Jul-2028
18	Swatantra Dev Singh	BJP	NDA	31-Jan-2021	30-Jan-2027
19	A. K. Sharma	BJP	NDA	31-Jan-2021	30-Jan-2027
20	Kunwar Manvendra Singh	BJP	NDA	31-Jan-2021	30-Jan-2027
21	Govind Narayan Shukla	BJP	NDA	31-Jan-2021	30-Jan-2027
22	Salil Vishnoi	BJP	NDA	31-Jan-2021	30-Jan-2027
23	Ashwani Tyagi	BJP	NDA	31-Jan-2021	30-Jan-2027
24	Dharmveer Prajapati	BJP	NDA	31-Jan-2021	30-Jan-2027
25	Surendra Choudhary	BJP	NDA	31-Jan-2021	30-Jan-2027
26	Dharmendra Senthwar	BJP	NDA	11-Aug-2022	30-Jan-2027
27	Padmasen Chaudhary	BJP	NDA	29-May-2023	30-Jan-2027
28	Dara Singh Chauhan	BJP	NDA	23-Jan-2024	30-Jan-2027
29	Ashish Patel	AD(S)	NDA	06-May-2024	05-May-2030
30	Yogesh Choudhary	RLD	NDA	06-May-2024	05-May-2030
31	Vichhelal Rajbhar	SBSP	NDA	06-May-2024	05-May-2030
32	Balram Yadav	SP	SP+	06-May-2024	05-May-2030
33	Shah Alam	SP	SP+	06-May-2024	05-May-2030
34	Kiranpal Kashyap	SP	SP+	06-May-2024	05-May-2030
35	Mukul Yadav	SP	SP+	06-Jul-2022	05-Jul-2028
36	Mohammad Jasmir Ansari	SP	SP+	06-Jul-2022	05-Jul-2028
37	Shahnawaz Khan	SP	SP+	06-Jul-2022	05-Jul-2028
38	Rajendra Chaudhary	SP	SP+	31-Jan-2021	30-Jan-2027

=== Elected by Local Authorities constituencies (36) ===
Keys: BJP (33) Independent (2) JSD(L) (1)

#	Constituency	Member	Party	Alliance	Term start	Term end
1	Raebareli	Dinesh Pratap Singh	BJP	NDA	12-Apr-2022	11-Apr-2028
2	Jaunpur	Brijesh Singh	BJP	NDA	12-Apr-2022	11-Apr-2028
3	Muzaffarnagar–Saharanpur	Vandana Verma	BJP	NDA	12-Apr-2022	11-Apr-2028
4	Moradabad–Bijnor	Satyapal Saini	BJP	NDA	12-Apr-2022	11-Apr-2028
5	Rampur–Bareilly	Kunwar Maharaj Singh	BJP	NDA	12-Apr-2022	11-Apr-2028
6	Pilibhit–Shahjahanpur	Sudhir Gupta	BJP	NDA	12-Apr-2022	11-Apr-2028
7	Hardoi	Ashok Agrawal	BJP	NDA	12-Apr-2022	11-Apr-2028
8	Lakhimpur–Kheri	Anoop Kumar Gupta	BJP	NDA	12-Apr-2022	11-Apr-2028
9	Sitapur	Pawan Singh Chauhan	BJP	NDA	12-Apr-2022	11-Apr-2028
10	Lucknow–Unnao	Ram Chandra Pradhan	BJP	NDA	12-Apr-2022	11-Apr-2028
11	Sultanpur	Shailendra Pratap Singh	BJP	NDA	12-Apr-2022	11-Apr-2028
12	Barabanki	Angad Singh	BJP	NDA	12-Apr-2022	11-Apr-2028
13	Bahraich	Pragya Tripathi	BJP	NDA	12-Apr-2022	11-Apr-2028
14	Gonda	Awadhesh Kumar Singh	BJP	NDA	12-Apr-2022	11-Apr-2028
15	Faizabad	Hariom Pandey	BJP	NDA	12-Apr-2022	11-Apr-2028
16	Basti–Siddharth Nagar	Subhash Yaduvansh	BJP	NDA	12-Apr-2022	11-Apr-2028
17	Gorakhpur–Maharajganj	C. P. Chand	BJP	NDA	12-Apr-2022	11-Apr-2028
18	Deoria	Ratanpal Singh	BJP	NDA	12-Apr-2022	11-Apr-2028
19	Ballia	Ravishanker Singh	BJP	NDA	12-Apr-2022	11-Apr-2028
20	Mirzapur–Sonbhadra	Shyam Narayan Singh	BJP	NDA	12-Apr-2022	11-Apr-2028
21	Allahabad	K. P. Srivastav	BJP	NDA	12-Apr-2022	11-Apr-2028
22	Banda–Hamirpur	Jitendra Singh Sengar	BJP	NDA	12-Apr-2022	11-Apr-2028
23	Jhansi–Jalaun–Lalitpur	Rama Niranjan	BJP	NDA	12-Apr-2022	11-Apr-2028
24	Kanpur–Fatehpur	Avinash Singh Chauhan	BJP	NDA	12-Apr-2022	11-Apr-2028
25	Etawah–Farrukhabad	Pranshu Dutt Dwivedi	BJP	NDA	12-Apr-2022	11-Apr-2028
26	Agra–Firozabad	Vijay Shivhare	BJP	NDA	12-Apr-2022	11-Apr-2028
27	Mathura–Etah–Mainpuri	Ashish Kumar Yadav	BJP	NDA	12-Apr-2022	11-Apr-2028
28	Mathura–Etah–Mainpuri	Om Prakash Singh	BJP	NDA	12-Apr-2022	11-Apr-2028
29	Aligarh–Hathras	Chaudhary Rishipal Singh	BJP	NDA	12-Apr-2022	11-Apr-2028
30	Bulandshahar–Noida	Narendra Bhati	BJP	NDA	12-Apr-2022	11-Apr-2028
31	Meerut–Ghaziabad	Dharmendra Bhardwaj	BJP	NDA	12-Apr-2022	11-Apr-2028
32	Ghazipur	Vishal Singh Chanchal	BJP	NDA	12-Apr-2022	11-Apr-2028
33	Badaun	Vagish Pathak	BJP	NDA	12-Apr-2022	11-Apr-2028
34	Varanasi	Annapurna Singh	IND	None	12-Apr-2022	11-Apr-2028
35	Azamgarh–Mau	Vikrant Singh	IND	None	12-Apr-2022	11-Apr-2028
36	Pratapgarh	Akshay Pratap Singh	JSD(L)	None	12-Apr-2022	11-Apr-2028

=== Elected from Graduate constituencies (8) ===
Keys: BJP (5) SP (3)

#	Constituency	Member	Party	Alliance	Term start	Term end
1	Bareilly–Moradabad	Jai Pal Singh	BJP	NDA	13-Feb-2023	12-Feb-2029
2	Gorakhpur–Faizabad	Devendra Pratap Singh	BJP	NDA	13-Feb-2023	12-Feb-2029
3	Kanpur	Arun Pathak	BJP	NDA	13-Feb-2023	12-Feb-2029
4	Agra	Manvendra Pratap Singh	BJP	NDA	01-Dec-2026	30-Nov-2032
5	Meerut	Dinesh Kumar Goel	BJP	NDA	01-Dec-2026	30-Nov-2032
6	Lucknow	Kanti Singh	SP	SP+	01-Dec-2026	30-Nov-2032
7	Varanasi	Ashutosh Sinha	SP	SP+	01-Dec-2026	30-Nov-2032
8	Allahabad–Jhansi	Man Singh Yadav	SP	SP+	01-Dec-2026	30-Nov-2032

=== Elected from Teacher constituencies (8) ===
Keys: BJP (5) SP (2) IND (1)

#	Constituency	Member	Party	Alliance	Term start	Term end
1	Allahabad–Jhansi	Babu Lal Tiwari	BJP	NDA	13-Feb-2023	12-Feb-2029
2	Bareilly–Moradabad	Hari Singh Dhillon	BJP	NDA	01-Dec-2026	30-Nov-2032
3	Lucknow	Umesh Dwivedi	BJP	NDA	01-Dec-2026	30-Nov-2032
4	Meerut	Shrichand Sharma	BJP	NDA	01-Dec-2026	30-Nov-2032
5	Gorakhpur–Faizabad	Dhruv Kumar Tripathi	BJP	NDA	01-Dec-2026	30-Nov-2032
6	Varanasi	Lal Bihari Yadav	SP	SP+	01-Dec-2026	30-Nov-2032
7	Agra	Akash Agarwal	SP	SP+	01-Dec-2026	30-Nov-2032
8	Kanpur	Raj Bahadur Singh Chandel	IND	None	13-Feb-2023	12-Feb-2029

=== Nominated by Governor (10) ===
Keys: BJP (8) NISHAD (1) Vacant (1)

#	Member	Party	Alliance	Term start	Term end
1	Rajnikant Maheshwari	BJP	NDA	03-Apr-2023	02-Apr-2029
2	Saket Misra	BJP	NDA	03-Apr-2023	02-Apr-2029
3	Ram Surat Rajbhar	BJP	NDA	03-Apr-2023	02-Apr-2029
4	Hans Raj Vishwakarma	BJP	NDA	03-Apr-2023	02-Apr-2029
5	Tariq Mansoor	BJP	NDA	03-Apr-2023	02-Apr-2029
6	Lalaji Prasad Nirmal	BJP	NDA	03-Apr-2023	02-Apr-2029
7	Gopal Anjan Bhurji	BJP	NDA	01-Oct 2021	30-Sep-2027
8	Choudhary Virender Singh	BJP	NDA	01-Oct 2021	30-Sep-2027
9	Sanjay Nishad	NISHAD	NDA	01-Oct 2021	30-Sep-2027
10	Vacant since 8 June 2024				30-Sep-2027

== See also ==
- Uttar Pradesh Legislative Assembly
- Leader of the Opposition in the Uttar Pradesh Legislative Council
