= Pawan Singh Chauhan =

Indian politician

Member of Uttar Pradesh Legislative council
- Incumbent
- Assumed office 2022
- Preceded by: Anand Bhadauriya
- Constituency: Sitapur Local Authorities

Personal details
- Born: 3 February 1965 (age 61) Lucknow, Uttar Pradesh, India
- Party: Bharatiya Janata Party
- Education: MBA
- Occupation: Educationist
- Profession: Politician

Pawan Singh Chauhan (born 3 February 1965) is an Indian politician from Bhartiya Janata Party. He has been a member of the Uttar Pradesh Legislative Council from Sitapur since 2022. And he is the Chairman of SR Group.

== Early life and career ==
He was born on 3 February 1965 in Lucknow, the capital of Uttar Pradesh. He also worked as a tea seller in his childhood. His son's name is Piyush Singh Chauhan, Vice Chairman of SR Group Lucknow.
