= Yogesh Choudhary =

Indian politician

Yogesh Chaudhary

Member of the Uttar Pradesh Legislative Council
- Incumbent
- Assumed office 6 May 2024
- Preceded by: Mohsin Raza
- Constituency: elected by Legislative Assembly members

Personal details
- Born: 11 January 1973 (age 53) Mathura, Uttar Pradesh, India
- Party: Rashtriya Lok Dal
- Profession: Politician

Yogesh Nauhwar is an Indian politician who is serving as a Member of Uttar Pradesh Legislative Council.

== Political career ==
Yogesh Chaudhary joined RLD in 2007. He contested in a by-election in the seat of Mant in 2012 after it was vacated by Jayant Chaudhary but lost. In 2017, he contested in the same constituency on a RLD Ticket but lost by a margin of 432 votes. In 2022, his ticket was withdrawn at the last stage after filing nomination. In 2024, RLD made him a candidate for the MLC election and he was elected unopposed along with 9 NDA candidates.
