= Manvendra Singh Chauhan =

Indian Politician

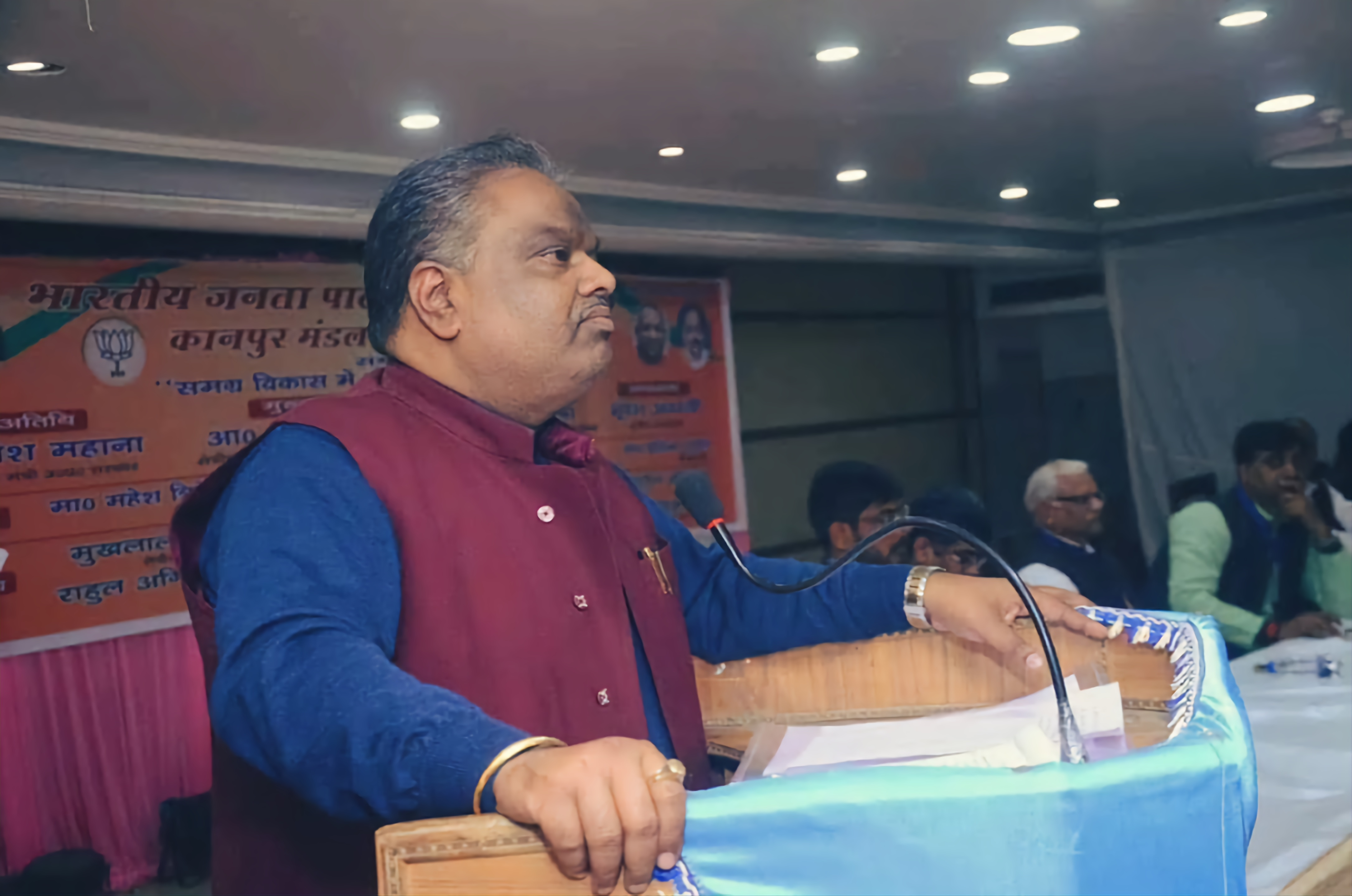
- Chauhan in 2019

Member of Uttar Pradesh Legislative Council
- Incumbent
- Assumed office 29 May 2023
- Constituency: elected by Legislative Assembly members

Ex. Vice President of Bharatiya Janata Party, Uttar Pradesh
- Incumbent
- Assumed office 2023

Regional President of Bharatiya Janata Party, Kanpur - Bundelkhand
- In office 2016–2023

Personal details
- Born: 26 January 1970 (age 56) Kanpur district, Uttar Pradesh, India
- Party: Bharatiya Janata Party
- Parent: Late Suryabhan Singh Chauhan (father)
- Occupation: Politician

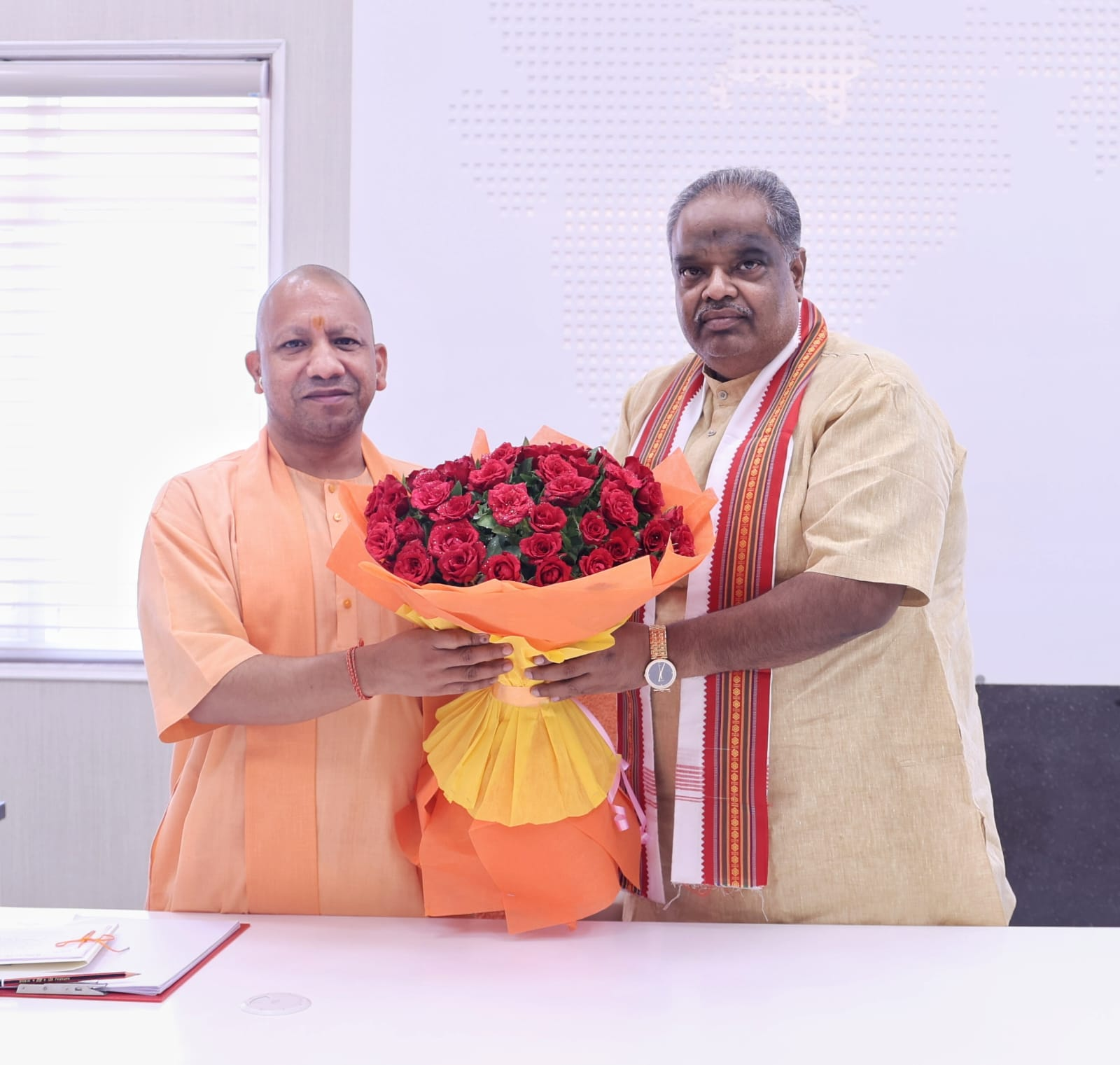
Chauhan in right with Chief Minister of Uttar Pradesh Yogi Adityanath in 2023

Manvendra Singh Chauhan (born 26 January 1970) is an Indian Politician currently serving as a member in Uttar Pradesh Legislative Council. He was a Vice President in the Bhartiya Janta Party state unit of Uttar Pradesh and has been the regional president for Kanpur Bundelkhand region of Uttar Pradesh for BJP organisation from 2016 to 2023. Before 2016 he also served as regional vice president for BJP Kanpur region from 2012 to 2016.

== Early life and education ==
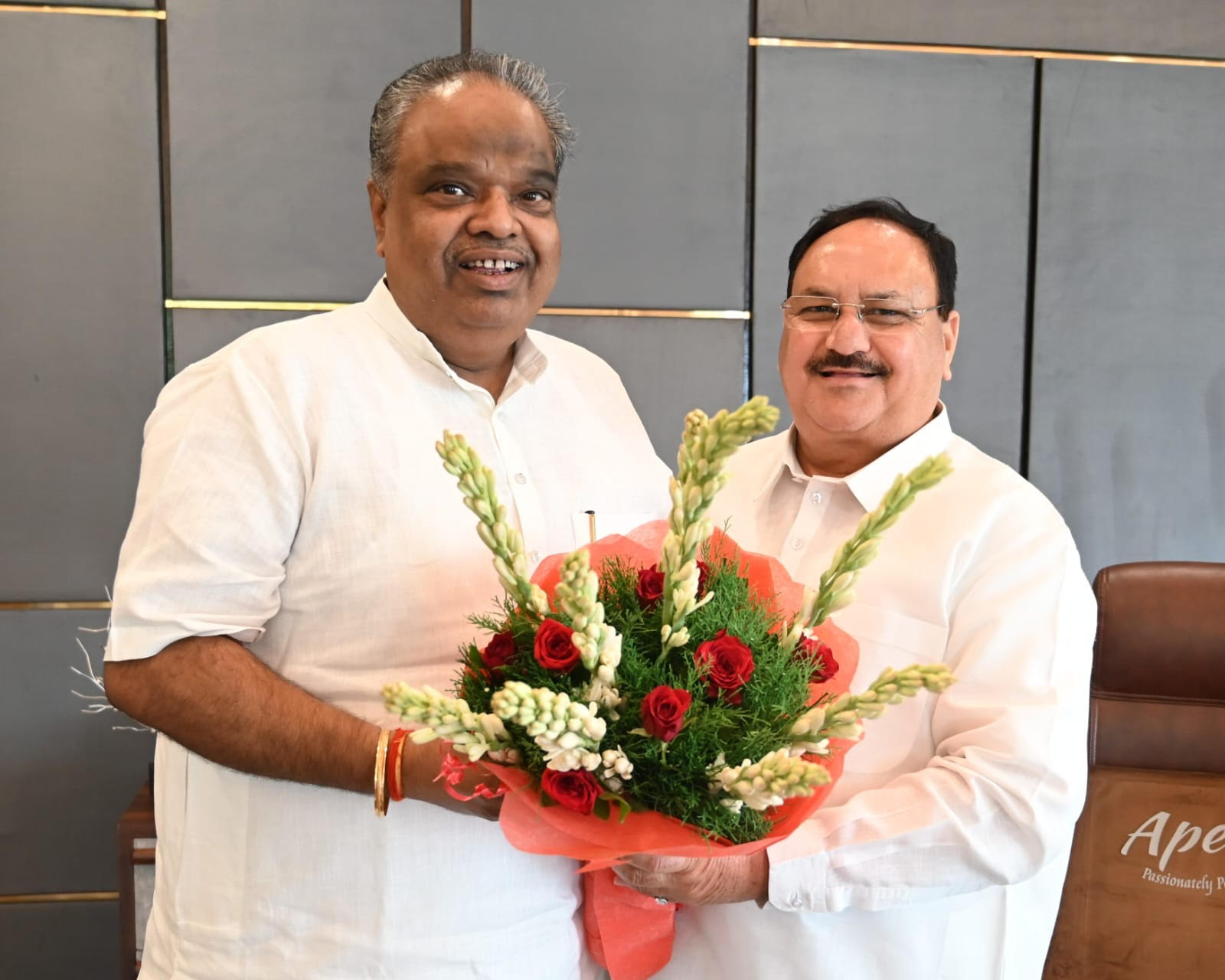
Chauhan with BJP National President J P Nadda in 2023

Manvendra Singh Chauhan was born in Kanpur District of Uttar Pradesh in 1970 to Shri Suryabhan Singh Chauhan and Shrimati Kamlesh Kumari Chauhan. His father was a state civil services officer and he did his schooling from Kanpur. He is a graduate with a bachelor's degree in commerce from CSJMU, Kanpur.

== Political career ==
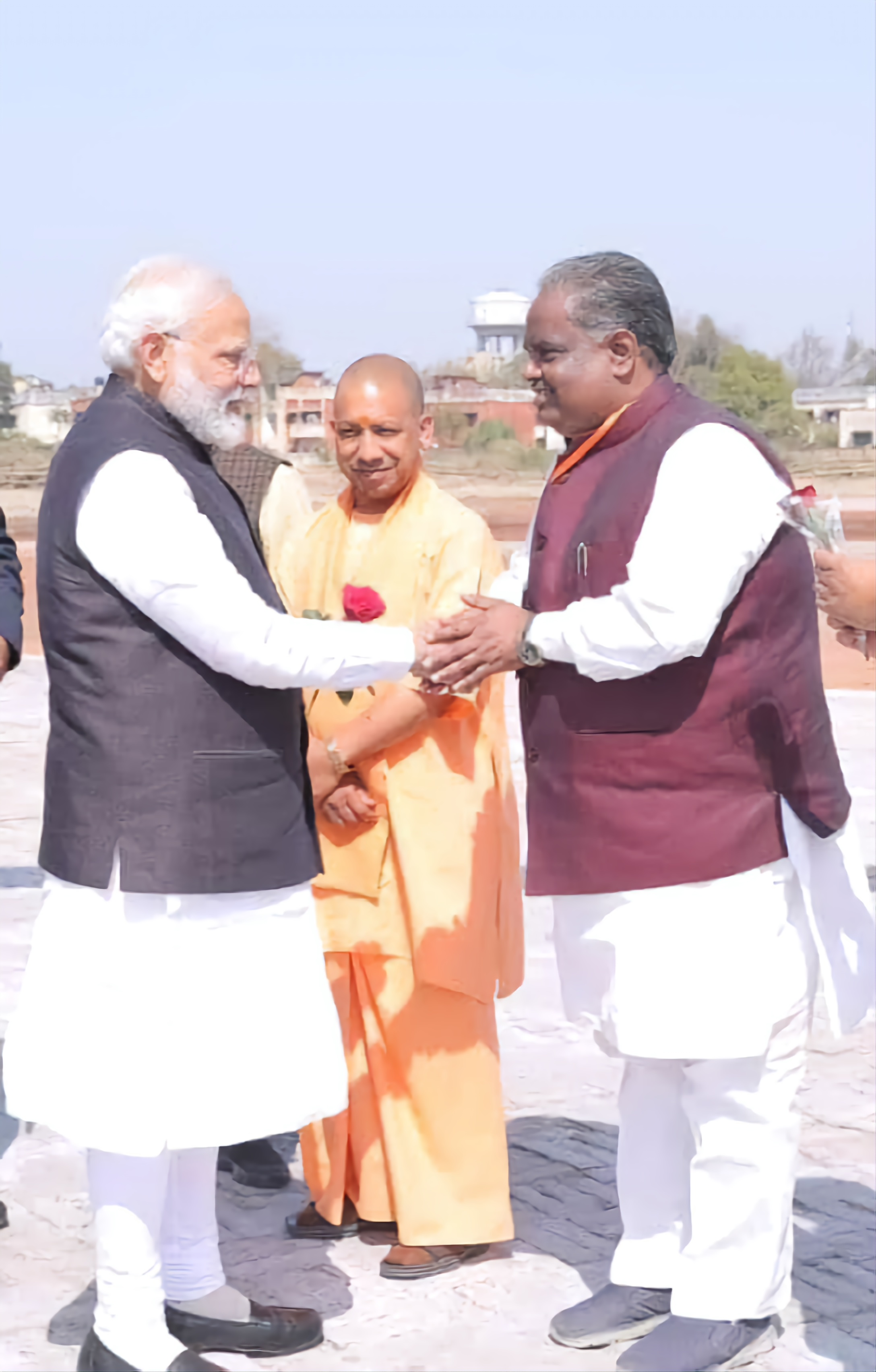
Chauhan with Prime Minister Narendra Modi in 2019

Chauhan has been involved with Bhartiya Janta Party and RSS since an early age. He has worked in several capacities in different wings of Bhartiya Janta Party. He worked as a treasurer for the Panchayat Raj Prakosht of BJP in U.P. in the early phases of his career and later as vice president in the Kisan Morcha of BJP in U.P.

He was made regional vice president of BJP Kanpur region in 2012, a post that he held until 2016 when the Kanpur region was combined with the Bundelkhand region of the BJP organisation and he was made the Regional President. He held the office of Regional President from 2016 to 2023 when he was made a Vice President of party's state unit. He is also a nominated member of Legislative Council of Uttar Pradesh since 2023.
