= Saket Misra =

Indian politician

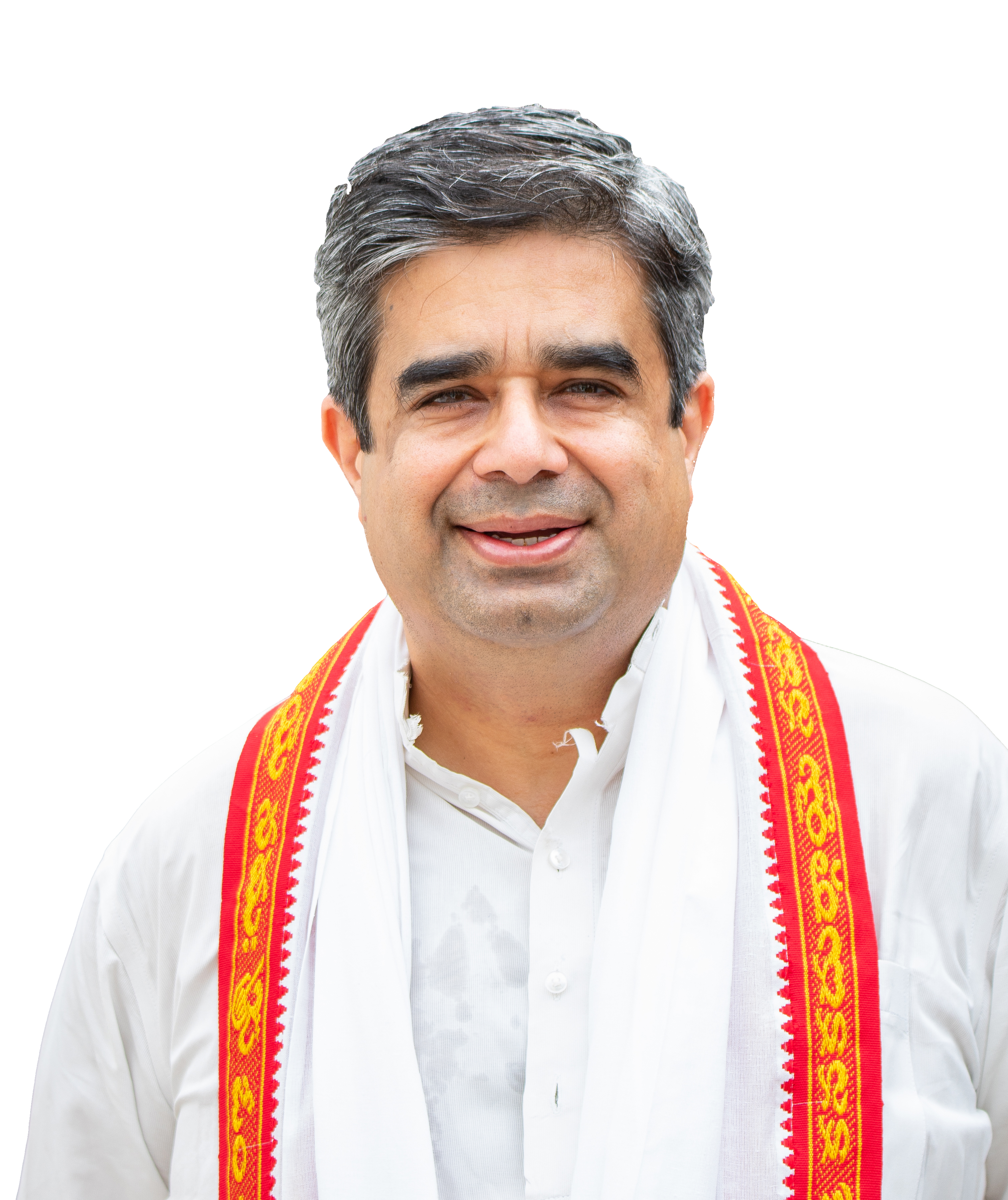

Member of Uttar Pradesh Legislative council
- Incumbent
- Assumed office 2023
- Constituency: Nominated By Governor

Personal details
- Born: Lucknow
- Party: Bharatiya Janata Party
- Parent: Nripendra Misra (father)
- Education: St. Stephen's College, Delhi; Delhi University; Indian Institute of Management, Calcutta; Harvard Business School; London Business School
- Profession: Ex. IPS, Investment Banker, Trader, Politician

Saket Misra (Hindi: साकेत मिश्र; born 24 July 1971) is an Indian politician, former career asset manager, investment banker and former IPS officer. As a way of giving back to society, he has become involved in social action and community service in recent years. Saket is a nominated member of Uttar Pradesh Legislative Council since April 2023.

== Early life and education ==
Misra was born in Lucknow, Uttar Pradesh. His father, Nripendra Misra, hails from Deoria and is a former IAS officer. His mother, Smt. Kusum Misra, is a housewife and belongs to Shravasti (formerly Bahraich). Given his father's transferable job, Saket studied at various schools in India and the United States. He attended St. Stephen's College and graduated with a B.A. (Honours) in Economics. At St. Stephen's, he received the Rajpal Memorial Award. He then pursued his MBA at IIM Calcutta and double-majored in Finance and Marketing.

Misra has also attended advanced courses at Harvard Business School and London Business School.

== Career ==
Misra was selected for the Indian Police Service in 1994 (UP cadre). He pursued a career in Investment Banking.

Banking: After opting out of the Indian Police Service in 1994, Misra began his investment banking career with Deutsche Bank. He worked with Deutsche Bank in India, Hong Kong, and Singapore, including in senior regional management roles. Subsequently, he joined Royal Bank of Scotland and, as a managing director, handled many Asia-Pacific responsibilities. Misra then returned to India and became CEO of an NBFC.

Teaching: Misra serves as an Adjunct Faculty at the Indian Institute of Corporate Affairs.

Poorvanchal Vikas Board – In 2019, Misra was appointed Advisor, Poorvanchal Vikas Board, to provide ideas for the holistic development of Eastern Uttar Pradesh. He travelled across eastern Uttar Pradesh, and was enriched by the knowledge gained from on-the-ground interactions with the people. Bringing together his international experience and insights from his observations across Poorvanchal, he came up with policy proposals for the Uttar Pradesh government's consideration.

== Community Service ==
Misra is passionate about the country and wants to contribute to India's resurgence as an economic power and a force for good on the global stage. He wants to create opportunities for the underprivileged in India to achieve their potential and to get rights that have been denied for a long time. While overseas, he helped organize international conferences that showcased the New India and tried to build consensus about fairer access to the global commons. He has been a speaker at multiple investment seminars to attract investment to India. He worked with social enterprises like the Singapore Indian Development Association and collected resources for providing assistance to those hurt by natural calamities.

Coming back to India, Misra focused on improving lives in Poorvanchal (Eastern Uttar Pradesh). He has fought against injustice and the exploitation of the underprivileged. He has also worked to channel CSR initiatives to the needy in Poorvanchal, ensuring no leakages and efficient use of resources. As an Advisor to the Poorvanchal Vikas Board, Misra was able to identify major gaps in health, education, and transport in various districts that were then acted upon.

== Political career ==
His entry into politics was an offshoot of his community service. Inspired by the transformational efforts of Prime Minister Narendra Modi, he too wanted to make a humble contribution. He was nominated as Member of Uttar Pradesh Legislative Council. Saket lost as a candidate from the Shravasti Lok Sabha constituency for the Lok Sabha Elections 2024.

== Other Engagements ==
Founded the Aabhar Trust, which provides assistance to the children of martyred police service personnel. The trust is entirely funded by Saket and his family from their salaries and savings.

Frequent contributor to national newspapers (Economic Times, Business Standard, Times of India, Dainik Jagran etc.,) and on debates hosted by national news channels like CNN, CNBC, etc. on economics, development, and the cross-over between international strategy, politics, and economics.

== Family ==
Saket's family consists of his wife and two children.

Saket's maternal grandfather, the late Badlu Ram Shukla, was one of the most senior lawyers in the Purvanchal area. He himself funded the education of thousands of youths. He was one of the founders of the Praja Socialist Party and represented Bahraich as a Member of Parliament and a Member of Legislative Assembly.

== Award and honours ==
Saket received Bharat Gaurav Puraskar in 2021 for social service and contribution to society.
