= Ram Tirath Singhal =

Indian politician

Member of Uttar Pradesh Legislative Council
- Incumbent
- Assumed office 6 May 2024
- Constituency: elected by Legislative Assembly members

Mayor of Jhansi
- In office 2017–2023

Personal details
- Born: 23 November 1956 (age 69) Bundelkhand, Jhasi, Uttar Pradesh, India
- Party: Bharatiya Janata Party
- Parent: Jagdish Prasad Singhal (father)
- Profession: Politician; Businessman

Ram Tirath Singhal is an Indian politician currently serving as the member of the Uttar Pradesh Legislative Council and the party member of the Bharatiya Janata Party.

== Early life ==
Singhal was born on 23 November 1956 to businessman Jagdish Prasad Singhal.

== Education ==
Singhal completed his master's degree in Economics from Bundelkhand University.

== Political career ==
In the following Jhansi Mayor Election Result 2017 BJP's Ram Tirth Singhal won Mayor's seat of Jhansi by defeating the BSP's Brijendra Vyas with 16074 votes.

Singhal is currently a Uttar Pradesh Legislative Council member. BJP announced seven candidates for the legislative council election 2024 before elections during a media conference in his office and Singhal's name was mentioned in the list.
