= Pranshu Dutt Dwivedi =

Indian Politician (born 1983)

Pranshu Dutt Diwedi

Former President Bharatiya Janata Yuva Morcha, Uttar Pradesh
- In office June 21, 2021 – June 26, 2026
- Preceded by: Subhash Yaduvansh
- Succeeded by: Dr Rohit Mishra

Member of Uttar Pradesh Legislative Council
- Incumbent
- Assumed office April 12, 2022
- Preceded by: Pushpraj Jain
- Constituency: Etawah-Farrukhabad Local authorities

Personal details
- Born: April 15, 1983 (age 43) Farrukhabad, Uttar Pradesh
- Party: Bhartiya Janta Party
- Relations: Brahm Dutt Dwivedi (uncle) Sunil Dutt Dwivedi (cousin)
- Parent: Hari Dutt Dwivedi (Father)

Pranshu Dutt Diwedi is an Indian politician who is currently serving as a Member of the Uttar Pradesh Legislative Council and the State President of BJP Yuva Morcha. He is from Farrukhabad, Uttar Pradesh.
