= Mohit Beniwal =

Indian politician

Member of Uttar Pradesh Legislative Council
- Incumbent
- Assumed office 6 May 2024
- Constituency: elected by legislative assembly members

State Vice President of BJP Unit in Uttar Pradesh
- Incumbent
- Assumed office March 2023

Personal details
- Party: Bharatiya Janata Party
- Education: IIT Delhi (B.Tech.)
- Profession: Politician

Mohit Beniwal is an Indian politician currently serving as the Member of Uttar Pradesh Legislative Council since 2024 and affiliated with Bharatiya Janata Party.

Beniwal is State Vice President of BJP in Uttar Pradesh, prior to which he was President, BJP West U.P. Zone.

== Education ==
Beniwal completed his B.Tech degree from IIT Delhi.
