= Shah Nawaz Khan, Punjab =

Coordinates: 30°33′0″N 73°33′0″E

- Town and union council
- Interactive map of Shah Nawaz Khan, Punjab
- Country: Pakistan
- Province: Punjab
- District: Okara
- Time zone: UTC+5 (PST)

Shah Nawaz Khan is a town and union council of Depalpur Tehsil in the Okara District of Punjab province, Pakistan. It is lies to the south of the district capital Okara and south-west of the tehsil capital Depalpur at 30°33'0N 73°32'60E.
