= Vishal Singh Chanchal =

Indian politician

Member of Uttar Pradesh Legislative Council
- Incumbent
- Assumed office 12 April 2016
- Preceded by: Madan Singh Yadav
- Constituency: Ghazipur local authorities

Personal details
- Born: 20 March 1983 (age 43) Ghazipur, Uttar Pradesh, India
- Party: Bharatiya Janata Party
- Parent: Devendra Pratap Singh (father)

Vishal Singh Chanchal is an Indian politician and social activist and he has been serving as a member of the Uttar Pradesh Legislative Council since 12 April 2016.

== Political career ==
In the 2016 Ghazipur MLC elections, the result was declared on 12 April 2016. Vishal Singh Chanchal defeated Sanand Singh, the candidate of the Samajwadi Party, by a margin of 65 votes.

In the 2022 Ghazipur MLC elections, the result was declared on 12 April 2022. Vishal Singh Cha defeated Madan Singh Yadav, the candidate of Independent, by a margin of 5,666 votes.
