= Vichhelal Rajbhar =

Indian politician

Vichhelal Ram Rajbhar

Member of Uttar Pradesh Legislative Council
- Incumbent
- Assumed office 6 May 2024
- Constituency: elected by Legislative Assembly members

State President Suheldev Bharatiya Samaj Party Purvanchal Mukhya Committee
- Incumbent
- Assumed office 2022

District President Suheldev Bharatiya Samaj Party Mau Uttar Pradesh
- In office 2005–2016

Personal details
- Party: Suheldev Bharatiya Samaj Party
- Profession: Politician

Vichhelal Ram Rajbhar is a Member of Uttar Pradesh Legislative Council who belongs to Suheldev Bharatiya Samaj Party.

== Political career ==
Vichhelal Rajbhar is close to Party President and Cabinet Minister Om Prakash Rajbhar.

He joined SBSP in 2003.

He contested the local Jila Panchayat Election in 2005 but lost by a small margin. After that he held the post of Jila Adhyaksh Mau from 2005 until 2016. From 2022 he has been State President Purvanchal Mukhya Committee of SBSP.
