= Avinash Singh Chauhan =

Indian politician

Member of Uttar Pradesh Legislative Council
- Incumbent
- Assumed office 11 April 2022
- Preceded by: Dillip Singh
- Constituency: Kanpur-Fatehpur local authorities

State President of Bhartiya Janta Party, Kanpur Dehant, Uttar Pradesh
- Incumbent
- Assumed office 2020

Personal details
- Born: Sheruaa, Kanpur, Uttar Pradesh, India
- Party: Bharatiya Janata Party

Avinash Singh Chauhan is an Indian politician who has been serving as a member of the Uttar Pradesh Legislative Council since 12 April 2022.

== Early life ==
Chauhan originally hails from Sheruaa village in Kanpur, Uttar Pradesh.

== Political career ==
Chauhan has been serving as the State President of the Bharatiya Janata Party, Kanpur Dehat, since 2020. He filed his nomination for the MLC elections in 2022 from the Kanpur-Fatehpur local authorities.

In the 2022 Kanpur-Fatehpur MLC elections, the result was declared on 12 April 2022. Avinash Singh Chauhan defeated Dilip Singh, the candidate of the Samajwadi Party, by a margin of 4,387 votes.
