= Gopal Anjan Bhurji =

Indian politician

Member of Uttar Pradesh Legislative Council
- Incumbent
- Assumed office October 18, 2021
- Nominated by: Governor of Uttar Pradesh
- Chief Minister: Yogi Adityanath

Personal details
- Party: Bharatiya Janata Party
- Occupation: Politician

Gopal Anjan Bhurji is an Indian politician from the state of Uttar Pradesh currently he is serving as member of Uttar Pradesh Legislative Council from 18 October 2021. He was nominated by the governor of Uttar Pradesh for his services to the community. He is affiliated with the Bharatiya Janata Party. Previously he has served as vice - chairman of Uttar Pradesh Khadi & Village Industries Board (UPKVIB).
