= Shah Nawaz Khan (Afghan politician) =

Afghan politician

- Occupation: legislator

Shah Nawaz Khan came to serve to represent Ghazni Province in Afghanistan's Meshrano Jirga, the upper house of its National Legislature, in 2005. He is a member of the Pashtun ethnic group.
