= Om Prakash Singh (Mathura-Etah-Mainpuri politician) =

Indian politician

Member of Uttar Pradesh Legislative Council
- Incumbent
- Assumed office 12 April 2022
- Constituency: Mathura-Etah-Mainpuri Local Authorities

Personal details
- Party: Bharatiya Janata Party
- Profession: Politician

Om Prakash Singh is an Indian politician who has been serving as a member of the Uttar Pradesh Legislative Council representing Mathura-Etah-Mainpuri local Authority Constituencies since 12 April 2022. He represented the Bharatiya Janata Party.

== Political career ==
Singh served as the district president from 2009 to 2011 from etah district, Uttar pradesh. He has also been the District General Secretary twice. He was the District President of Yuva Morcha in 1993. Currently, he is a member of the State Executive Committee and co-convener of the BJP Cooperative Cell.
