= Rajnikant Maheshwari =

Indian politician

Member of Uttar Pradesh Legislative Council
- Incumbent
- Assumed office 3 April 2023
- Constituency: Nominated by governor

State Vice President of BJP in Braj Region
- Incumbent
- Assumed office March 2023

Personal details
- Party: Bharatiya Janata Party
- Profession: Politician

Rajnikant Maheshwari is an Indian politician and a member of the political party Bharatiya Janata Party who is currently serving as the member of the Uttar Pradesh Legislative Council since 2023 nominated by Governor.

== Political career ==
Maheshwari was appointed 2 times BJP President of Braj region.

== See also ==
- Uttar Pradesh Legislative Council
- Uttar Pradesh Legislative Assembly
- Member of Parliament, Lok Sabha
