= Santosh Singh (politician) =

Indian politician

Member of Uttar Pradesh Legislative Council
- Incumbent
- Assumed office 6 May 2024
- Constituency: elected by Legislative Assembly members

Personal details
- Party: Bharatiya Janata Party
- Profession: Politician

Santosh Singh is an Indian politician, currently affiliated with the Bharatiya Janata Party and serving member of the Uttar Pradesh Legislative Council since 2024.

== Early life and education ==
Santosh Singh was born in 1970 in a distinguished Rajput (Kshatriya) family of village Manjharia Ganga (Deoria Ganga), Khalilabad, Sant Kabir Nagar district, Uttar Pradesh. His father, Shri Ram Kinkar Singh, was a respected government teacher, known as a scholar and eminent person in the area. His mother, Smt. Manki Devi, died during his childhood.

He received his primary education in the village school established by his father. After this, he received his high school and intermediate education from Government Inter College, Basti. In 1988, he took admission in Lucknow University, from where he received his undergraduate and postgraduate degrees in Ancient Indian History.

== Student life and beginning of public life ==
While studying at Lucknow University, he came in contact with Akhil Bharatiya Vidyarthi Parishad (ABVP). Due to his commitment towards the organization and leadership ability, he was elected as the General Secretary of the Lucknow University Students Union in the year 1995-96 and as the President in the year 1998-99. He won both the elections with record votes. During his tenure, the construction of Bhaurao Deoras Dwar was notable as a major achievement.

== Political career ==
Singh is currently a Uttar Pradesh Legislative Council member. BJP announced seven candidates for the legislative council election 2024 before elections during a media conference in his office, and Singh's name was mentioned in the list.

From 2000 to 2004, he worked as a member of the National Working Committee of Bharatiya Janata Yuva Morcha (BJYM).

From 2004 to 2007, he was a member of the State Working Committee of the Bharatiya Janata Party, Uttar Pradesh, and led the organisational work in Uttar Pradesh as the State In-charge of Yuva Morcha.

From 2007 to 2010, he was again in-charge of various districts as a State Working Committee member and conducted organisational campaigns.

Between 2010 and 2013, he took over the responsibility of State Secretary of BJP Uttar Pradesh.

From 2013 to 2016, he was again a member of the State Working Committee. During this period, he was also responsible for the successful conduct of the rallies of Prime Minister Shri Narendra Modi, in-charge of many districts, and coordinator of campaigns.

While serving as State Secretary for two consecutive terms from 2016 to 2020, he led the party's rallies, election campaigns, and organisational activities in various districts.

From 2020 to 2022, he served as State Vice President of BJP Uttar Pradesh, where he was in-charge of many districts, campaigns and election rallies.

From 2022 to present, he has been active as the BJP State Vice President and Braj region in-charge.

In March 2024, he was nominated as a member of the Uttar Pradesh Legislative Council (MLC) by the Bharatiya Janata Party. His current term is till the year 2030.
