= Dhananjay Kannoujia =

Indian politician

MLA, 17th Legislative Assembly
- Incumbent
- Assumed office March 2017
- Preceded by: Gorakh Paswan
- Constituency: Belthara Road, Ballia

Personal details
- Born: 10 February 1984 (age 42) Jamuav, Belthara Road, Ballia, Uttar Pradesh
- Party: Bharatiya Janata Party
- Parent: Saryu Parsad Kanojiya
- Education: Navoday Alumni Ballia UP
- Occupation: MLA
- Profession: Politician, Agriculturist

Dhananjay Kannoujia is an Indian politician and a member of the 17th Legislative Assembly, Uttar Pradesh state in India. He represents the Belthara Road constituency in Ballia district of Uttar Pradesh.

== Political career ==
Dhananjay Kannoujia contested the Uttar Pradesh Assembly election as Bharatiya Janata Party candidate and defeated his close contestant Gorakh Paswan from Samajwadi Party with a margin of 18,319 votes.

== Posts held ==
#	From	To	Position	Comments
01	March 2017	March 2022	Member, 17th Legislative Assembly	

== See also ==
- Uttar Pradesh Legislative Assembly
