= Govind Narayan Shukla =

Indian politician

Member of Uttar Pradesh Legislative Council
- Incumbent
- Assumed office 31 Jan 2021
- Constituency: elected by Legislative Assembly members

State General Secretary Bharatiya Janata Party Uttar Pradesh
- Incumbent
- Assumed office 2018

Personal details
- Born: 1968 (age 57–58) Amethi, Uttar Pradesh
- Party: Bharatiya Janata Party
- Profession: Politician
- Nickname: Raja Babu

Govind Narayan Shukla alias Raja Babu is a Member of Uttar Pradesh legislative council and State General Secretary of Bharatiya Janata Party Uttar Pradesh.

== Political career ==
Shukla belongs to BJP and he started working for BJP at an early age. He is currently General Secretary of BJP Uttar Pradesh. BJP made him candidate for MLC election in 2021 and he won unopposed.
