= Angad Singh (BJP politician) =

Indian politician (born 1966)

Member of Uttar Pradesh Legislative Council
- Incumbent
- Assumed office 12 April 2022
- Constituency: Barabanki

Personal details
- Born: 1966 (age 59–60) Dariyabad, Barabanki, Uttar Pradesh, India
- Party: Bharatiya Janata Party
- Spouse: Punam Singh
- Parent: Jagannath Singh (father)
- Education: Lucknow University (Social work)
- Profession: Politician

Angad Kumar Singh also known as Angad Singh is an Indian politician who is currently serving as a member of the Uttar Pradesh Legislative Council and a party member of the Bharatiya Janata Party. He was elected from the Local Authority Constituencies.

== Early life ==
Singh was born to Jagannath Singh in year 1966.

== Education ==
Singh completed master's degree in social work from Lucknow University in year 1988.

== Personal life ==
Singh was married to Punam Singh.
