= Harendra Prasad Singh =

Indian politician

MLA, 17th Legislative Assembly
- Incumbent
- Assumed office March 2017
- Constituency: Zafarabad, Jaunpur

Personal details
- Party: Bharatiya Janata Party
- Occupation: MLA
- Profession: Politician

Dr Harendra Prasad Singh is an Indian politician and a member of 17th Legislative Assembly Uttar Pradesh state of India. He represents the Zafarabad constituency in Jaunpur of Uttar Pradesh. He contested Uttar Pradesh Assembly Election as Bharatiya Janata Party candidate and defeated his close rival Sachindra Nath Tripathi from Samajwadi Party with a margin of 24,865 votes.

== Political career ==
Harendra Prasad Singh is a member of the 17th Legislative Assembly of Uttar Pradesh. He is a member of Bharatiya Janata Party.

== Posts held ==
#	From	To	Position	Comments
01	2017	Incumbent	Member, 17th Legislative Assembly	

== See also ==
- Uttar Pradesh Legislative Assembly
