= Shahnawaz Khan (Indian politician) =

Indian politician

Member of Uttar Pradesh Legislative Council
- Incumbent
- Assumed office 6 July 2022
- Constituency: elected by Legislative assembly members

Personal details
- Born: March 9, 1980 (age 46) Saharanpur
- Party: Samajwadi Party
- Parent: Sarfaraz Khan (Ex Minister UP Govt.) (father)
- Education: Bachelor of Science
- Alma mater: Chaudhary Charan Singh University
- Occupation: Politician

Shahnawaz Khan is an Indian politician member of the Uttar Pradesh Legislative Council. He represents the constituency Saharanpur district as Party member of Samajwadi Party.

== Early life ==
Khan was born to Sarfaraz Khan at Dara Milkana, Saharanpur district. He gained a Bachelor of Science from Chaudhary Charan Singh University in 2000 and completed Masters in International Business from Leeds Metropolitan University in 2008.
