= Dharmendra Singh (politician) =

Indian politician

Member of Uttar Pradesh Legislative Council
- Incumbent
- Assumed office 6 May 2024
- Constituency: elected by legislative assembly members

Personal details
- Party: Bharatiya Janata Party
- Profession: Politician

Dharmendra Singh is an Indian politician currently serving as the Member of Uttar Pradesh Legislative Council and affiliated with Bharatiya Janata Party.
