= Dharmendra Singh Senthwar =

Indian politician

Member of Uttar Pradesh Legislative Council
- Incumbent
- Assumed office 11 Aug 2022
- Chief Minister: Yogi Adityanath
- Constituency: elected by Legislative Assembly members

Regional President of Bharatiya Janata Party, Gorakhpur
- Incumbent
- Assumed office 2022

Personal details
- Born: Gorakhpur district, Uttar Pradesh, India
- Party: BJP
- Occupation: Politician

Dharmendra Singh Senthwar is an Indian politician. He has been a Member of the Uttar Pradesh Legislative Council since 11 August 2022. He is affiliated with the Bharatiya Janata Party.

== Political career ==
He has been the Regional President of the Bharatiya Janata Party in Gorakhpur since 2022.

== Personal life ==
He hails from Gorakhpur district, Uttar Pradesh, India.
