= Mukesh Sharma (Uttar Pradesh Legislative Council member) =

Indian politician

Member of Uttar Pradesh Legislative Council
- Incumbent
- Assumed office 6 July 2022
- Constituency: elected by Legislative assembly members

President of Lucknow Maha Nagar
- In office 2019–2023

Personal details
- Party: Bharatiya Janata Party
- Profession: Politician

Mukesh Sharma is an Indian politician currently serving as the Member of Uttar Pradesh Legislative Council since 2022 and affiliated with Bharatiya Janata Party.

== Political career ==
Mukesh Sharma was declared the president of Lucknow Mahanagar in Bharatiya Janata Party.

Mukesh Sharma is the second president after Jaipal Singh in BJP's tenure in 39's rules.

== Positions held ==
Year	Description
6 July 2022	Elected to by legislative member from Uttar Pradesh Legislative Council
2019 - 2023	President of Lucknow Maha Nagar
