= Dharmendra Bhardwaj =

Indian politician

Member of Uttar Pradesh Legislative Council
- Incumbent
- Assumed office 12 April 2022
- Preceded by: Sunil Rohta
- Constituency: Meerut-Ghaziabad local authorities

Chancellor of Motherhood University, Roorkee, Uttarakhand
- Incumbent
- Assumed office 2019
- Preceded by: Yash Kaushik

Personal details
- Party: Bharatiya Janata Party

Dharmendra Bhardwaj is an Indian politician who has been serving as a member of the Uttar Pradesh Legislative Council since 12 April 2022 and current Chancellor of Motherhood University and Chairperson of Mahaveer Ayurvedic Medical College and Hospital, Meerut, Uttar Pradesh.

== Political career ==
In the 2022 Meerut-Ghaziabad MLC elections, the result was declared on 12 April 2022. Dharmendra Bhardwaj defeated Sunil Rohta, the candidate of the Rashtriya Lok Dal, by a margin of 4,140 votes.
