= Suheldev Bharatiya Samaj Party =

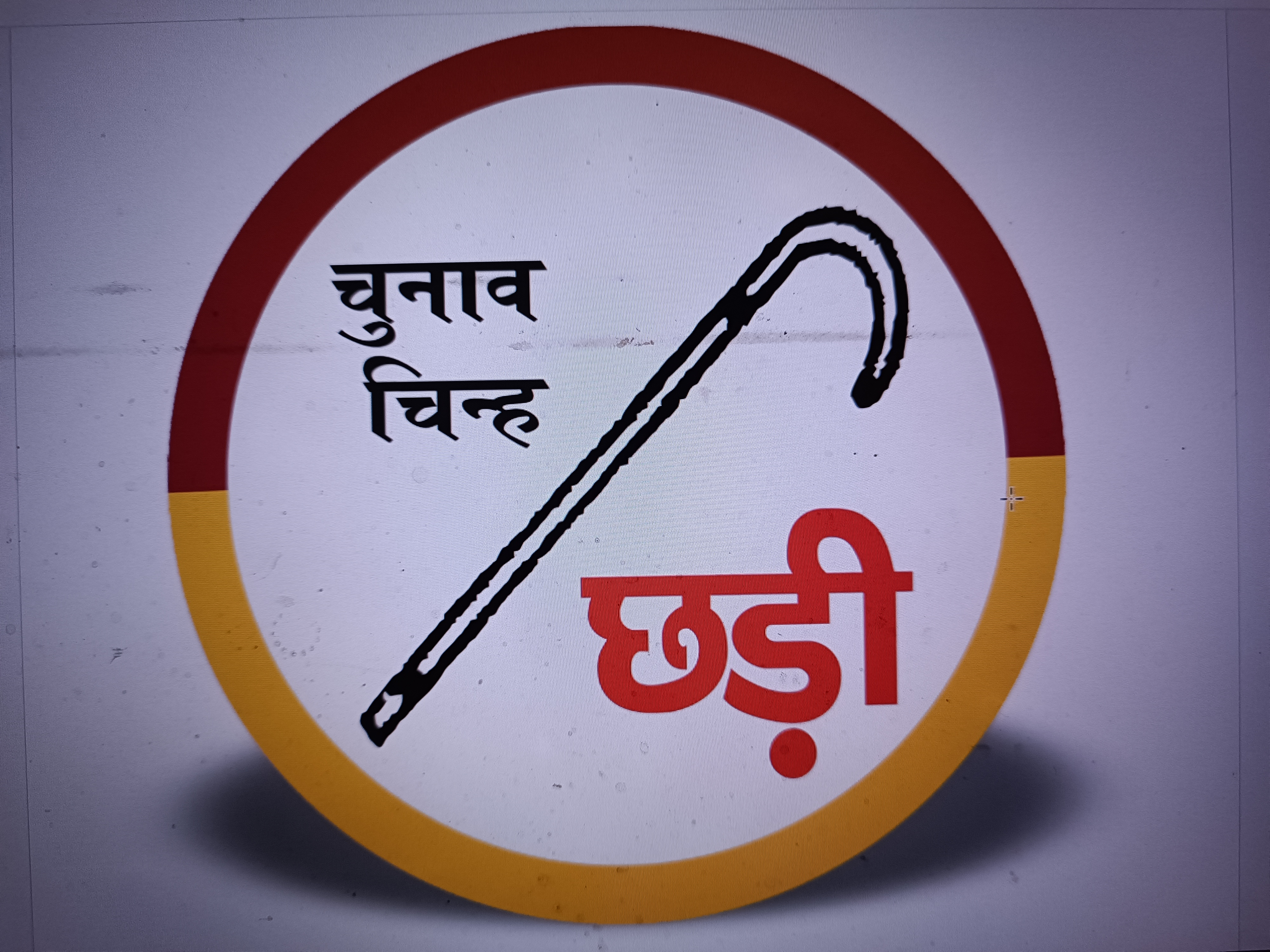
- Abbreviation: SBSP
- Leader: Om Prakash Rajbhar
- Founded: October 27, 2002; 23 years ago
- Colours: Yellow
- ECI status: Registered Unrecognized Party
- Alliance: NDA (2017–2019, 2023–present), GDSF (2020) (Bihar), SP+ (2021–2022)
- Seats in Uttar Pradesh Vidhan Sabha: 5 / 403
- Seats in Uttar Pradesh Vidhan Parishad: 1 / 100

Election symbol

Website
- www.sbsp.in

Suheldev Bharatiya Samaj Party is an Indian political party founded in 2002. The party is led by Om Prakash Rajbhar, Cabinet Minister in Uttar Pradesh. The party has its headquarters in Rasra, Ballia district, Uttar Pradesh. The party has a yellow flag.

== Profile ==
SBSP is based primarily based in eastern Uttar Pradesh and draws its support from the Rajbhar community. The party calls for the inclusion of the Rajbhar community in the list of Scheduled Tribes. However, it also favours the setting up of reservation quotas on socio-economic grounds.

== Electoral performance ==
=== Lok Sabha elections ===
Indian General Elections (Uttar Pradesh)
| Election Year | Election | Alliance | Party | Contested Seat | seat Won | Seats-/+ | Total Votes | Votes % | Votes % -/+ | | | | | |
Indian General Election 2004
| 2004 | 2004 | None | SBSP | 14 | 0 / 543 | 0 | 2,75,267 | 0.07% | New entry | | | | | |
| Indian General Election 2009 | | None | SBSP | | | | | | | | | | | |
| 2009 | 2009 | None | SBSP | | Adhikar Manch | SBSP | 20 | 0 / 543 | 0 | 3,19,307 | 0.12% | New entry | | |
| Indian General Election 2014 | | | SBSP | | Adhikar Manch | SBSP | | | | | | | | |
| 2014 | 2014 | | SBSP | Ekta Manch | Adhikar Manch | SBSP | SBSP | 13 | 0 / 543 | 0 | 1,18,947 | 0.15% | New entry | |
| Indian General Election 2019 | | | SBSP | Ekta Manch | | SBSP | SBSP | | | | | | | |
| 2019 | 2019 | | NDA | Ekta Manch | BJP | SBSP | SBSP | 1 | 0 / 543 | 0 | 2,77,260 | 0.30% | New entry | |
| Indian General Election 2024 | | | NDA | | BJP | SBSP | SBSP | | | | | | | |
| 2024 | 2024 | | NDA | | BJP | NDA | SBSP | SBSP | 1 | 0 / 543 | 0 | 3,40,188 | 0.38% | New entry |

=== Uttar Pradesh Assembly elections ===
Uttar Pradesh Assembly elections
| Election Year | Election | Alliance | Party | Contested Seat | seat Won | Seats-/+ | Total Votes | Votes % | Votes in % -/+ | | | | | |
Uttar Pradesh Assembly Election 2007
| 2007 | 14th Assembly | None | SBSP | 97 | 0 / 543 | 0 | 491,347 | 0.94% | New entry | | | | | |
| Uttar Pradesh Assembly Election 2012 | | None | SBSP | | | | | | | | | | | |
| 2012 | 15th Assembly | None | SBSP | | None | SBSP | 52 | 0 / 543 | 0 | 477,330 | 0.63% | New entry | | |
| Uttar Pradesh Assembly Election 2017 | | | SBSP | | None | SBSP | | | | | | | | |
| 2017 | 16th Assembly | | SBSP | | None | SBSP | NDA | SBSP | 8 | 4 / 543 | ▲4 | 6,07,911 | 0.70% | ▲0.07% |
| Uttar Pradesh Assembly Election 2022 | | | SBSP | | | SBSP | NDA | SBSP | | | | | | |
| 2022 | 18th Assembly | | SP+ | | SBSP | SBSP | NDA | SBSP | 8 | 6 / 403 | ▲2 | 12,52,925 | 1.36% | ▲0.66% |
| Uttar Pradesh Assembly elections 2027 | | | SP+ | | SBSP | SBSP | | SBSP | | | | | | |
| 2027 | 19th Assembly | | SP+ | | SBSP | NDA | SBSP | SBSP | TBD | 0 / 403 | | | | |

== Uttar Pradesh Assembly in member of SBSP ==
List of Members of Assembly of Uttar Pradesh
| SL.No. | Member Name | Alliance | Party | Constituency | Portrait | Assumed office | Left office | Time in office | Chief Minister | | | |
Uttar Pradesh Assembly Election 2017
| 1 | Om Prakash Rajbhar(MLA) | NDA | SBSP | Zahoorabad | | 19-March-2017 | Incumbent | 5 years, 0 days | YOGI ADITYANATH | | | |
| 2 | Ramanand Baudh(MLA) | NDA | SBSP | Ramkola | | 19-March-2017 | Incumbent | 5 years, 0 days | YOGI ADITYANATH | | | |
| 3 | Triveni Ram(MLA) | NDA | SBSP | Jakhanian | | 19-March-2017 | Incumbent | 5 years, 0 days | YOGI ADITYANATH | | | |
| 4 | Kailash Nath Sonkar(MLA) | NDA | SBSP | Ajagara | | 19-March-2017 | Incumbent | 5 years, 0 days | YOGI ADITYANATH | | | |
| Uttar Pradesh Assembly Election 2022 | | NDA | SBSP | | | | | | YOGI ADITYANATH | | | |
| 1 | Om Prakash Rajbhar(MLA) | NDA | SBSP | SP+ | SBSP | Zahoorabad | | 19-March-2022 | YOGI ADITYANATH | Incumbent | 4 years, 186 days | YOGI ADITYANATH |
| 2 | Dudhram(MLA) | Mahadewa(SC) | | SP+ | SBSP | 19-March-2022 | Incumbent | 4 years, 186 days | | | | YOGI ADITYANATH |
| 3 | Hansu Ram(MLA) | Belthara Road | | SP+ | SBSP | 19-March-2022 | Incumbent | 4 years, 186 days | | | | YOGI ADITYANATH |
| 4 | Abbas Ansari(MLA) | Mau | | SP+ | SBSP | 10-March-2022 | No Incumbent 01 Jun 2025 | 2 years, 347 days | | | | YOGI ADITYANATH |
| 5 | Jagadish Narayan(MLA) | Zafrabad | | SP+ | SBSP | 19-March-2022 | Incumbent | 4 years, 186 days | | | | YOGI ADITYANATH |
| 6 | Triveni Ram(MLA) | Jakhanian | | SP+ | SBSP | 19-March-2022 | Incumbent | 4 years, 186 days | | | | YOGI ADITYANATH |

== List of Members of Legislative Council of Uttar Pradesh ==
Uttar Pradesh Legislative council Election 2024
| SL.No. | Portrait | Member Name | Alliance | Party | Assumed Office | Left Office | Time in Office | Chief Minister |
|---|---|---|---|---|---|---|---|---|
| 1 | | Vichhelal Rajbhar(MLC) | NDA | SBSP | 06-May-2024 | Incumbent | 2 years, 138 days | YOGI ADITYANATH |

== Electoral history ==
=== Indian general election, 2004 ===
SBSP fielded 14 candidates in the 2004 Indian general election, one in Bihar and the rest in Uttar Pradesh. Together they obtained 275,267 votes (0.07% of the nationwide vote).

=== Bihar assembly elections, 2005 ===
The party contested the February 2005 Bihar Legislative Assembly election with three candidates. Together they obtained 13,655 votes (0.06% of the statewide vote). SBSP fielded two candidates in the subsequent October 2005 Legislative Assembly election in Bihar. Together they obtained 11,037 votes (0.05% of the statewide vote).

=== Uttar Pradesh assembly election, 2007 ===
The party contested 97 candidates in the 2007 Uttar Pradesh Legislative Assembly election. All but three candidates forfeited their deposits. It obtained a total of 491,347 votes (0.94% of the statewide vote).

=== Indian general election, 2009 ===
Ahead of the 2009 Indian general election SBSP joined the Apna Dal-led coalition Adhikar Manch ('Rights Platform'), an alliance of BSP splinter groups. SBSP fielded twenty candidates, who together obtained 319,307 votes, though all forfeited their deposits.

=== Bihar assembly election, 2010 ===
The party fielded six candidates in the 2010 Bihar Legislative Assembly election. Together they obtained 15,437 votes (0.05% of the statewide vote).

=== Uttar Pradesh assembly election, 2012 ===
The party ran 52 candidates in the 2012 Uttar Pradesh Legislative Assembly election. All but four candidates forfeited their deposits. In total the party obtained 477,330 votes (0.63% of the statewide vote).

=== Indian general election, 2014 ===
SBSP fielded 13 candidates in the 2014 Indian general election, whom together mustered 118,947 votes (0.02% of the nationwide vote). Ahead of the election SBSP took part in forming the Ekta Manch ('Unity Platform'), a coalition of smaller parties in Uttar Pradesh. Om Prakash Rajbhar served as convenor of the coalition.

=== Bihar assembly election, 2015 ===
In 2015 Bihar Legislative Assembly election, SBSP contested in only 2 seats but could not win any of them. though Azad Paswan a candidate came in 3rd in polls.

=== Uttar Pradesh assembly election, 2017 ===
In the 2017 Uttar Pradesh Legislative Assembly election, and working in alliance with BJP, SBSP contested eight seats in UP. It won five seats, with party leader Om Prakash Rajbhar becoming a minister in UP government.

=== Indian general election, 2019 ===
SBSP fielded 39 candidates in the 2019 Indian general election in Uttar Pradesh against BJP. This was in response to ally Bharatiya Janata Party’s proposal that SBSP contest on the saffron party’s lotus symbol from Ghosi in eastern Uttar Pradesh.

=== Bihar assembly election, 2020 ===
In the 2020 Bihar Legislative Assembly election, SBSP contested in only five seats as part of Grand Democratic Secular Front that also included Rashtriya Lok Samta Party, Bahujan Samaj Party, Samajwadi Janata Dal Democratic, All India Majlis-e-Ittehadul Muslimeen, and Janvadi Party (Socialist).

=== Uttar Pradesh assembly election, 2022 ===
In the 2022 Uttar Pradesh Legislative Assembly election, working in alliance with SP, SBSP contested in 17 seats in UP. They won six seats, with party leader Om Prakash Rajbhar in Uttar Pradesh.

=== Uttar Pradesh Legislative Council election, 2024 ===
In the 2024 election result NDA Gave One seat to SBSP out of 10 seats in the election SBSP fielded Vichhelal Rajbhar who won unopposed.

== See also ==
- List of political parties in India
