= Allahabad Lok Sabha constituency =

Lok Sabha Constituency in Uttar Pradesh, India

Coordinates: 25.4°N 81.8°E

Allahabad UP-52
- Lok Sabha constituency
- Interactive Map Outlining Allahabad Lok Sabha constituency

Constituency details
- Country: India
- Region: North India
- State: Uttar Pradesh
- Assembly constituencies: Meja; Karachhana; Allahabad South; Bara; Koraon
- Established: 1951–present
- Total electors: 1716160
- Reservation: None

Member of Parliament
- 18th Lok Sabha
- Incumbent Ujjwal Raman Singh
- Party: Indian National Congress
- Elected year: 2024

Allahabad is a Lok Sabha (parliamentary) constituency in the Prayagraj district (former Allahabad district) of Indian state of Uttar Pradesh.

Allahabad saw two MPs elected and became the prime minister. Lal Bahadur Shastri became the prime minister from 1964 to 1966. V. P. Singh was elected twice from this constituency and later went on to become the prime minister from 1989 to 1990.

Most Successful parties from Allahabad Lok Sabha
1. INC ( 10 Times) (43.3%)
2. BJP (5 Times) (21.4%)
3. Janata Dal (3 times) (12.8%)
4. Samajwadi Party (2 times) (8.50%)
5. Janata Party (1 time) (4.20%)

== Vidhan Sabha Segments ==
No	Name	District	Member	Party	2024 Lead
259	Meja	Prayagraj	Sandeep Singh Patel	SP	INC
260	Karachhana	Prayagraj	Piyush Ranjan Nishad	BJP	INC
263	Allahabad South	Prayagraj	Nand Gopal Gupta	BJP	BJP
265	Koraon (SC)	Prayagraj	Rajmani Kol	BJP	INC
264	Bara (SC)	Prayagraj	Dr.Vachaspati	AD(S)	INC

== Members of Lok Sabha ==
Year	Member	Party
1952	Sri Prakasa	Indian National Congress
1952^	Purushottam Das Tandon	Indian National Congress
1957	Lal Bahadur Shastri	Indian National Congress
1962	Lal Bahadur Shastri	Indian National Congress
1967	Hari Krishna Shastri	Indian National Congress
1971	Hemwati Nandan Bahuguna	Indian National Congress
1977	Janeshwar Mishra	Janata Party
1980	V. P. Singh	Indian National Congress (I)
1980^	Krishna Prakash Tiwari	Indian National Congress (I)
1984	Amitabh Bachchan	Indian National Congress
1988^	V. P. Singh	Jan Morcha
1989	Janeshwar Mishra	Janata Dal
1991	Saroj Dubey	Janata Dal
1996	Murli Manohar Joshi	Bharatiya Janata Party
1998	Murli Manohar Joshi	Bharatiya Janata Party
1999	Murli Manohar Joshi	Bharatiya Janata Party
2004	Rewati Raman Singh	Samajwadi Party
2009	Rewati Raman Singh	Samajwadi Party
2014	Shyama Charan Gupta	Bharatiya Janata Party
2019	Rita Bahuguna Joshi	Bharatiya Janata Party
2024	Ujjwal Raman Singh	Indian National Congress

^ denotes Bye-poll

== Election results ==
=== 2024 elections ===
2024 Indian general elections: Allahabad
Party	Candidate	Votes	%	±%
INC	Ujjwal Raman Singh	462,145	48.80	▲45.21
BJP	Neeraj Tripathi	403,350	42.59	▼13.03
BSP	Ramesh Kumar Patel	49,144	5.19	▲5.19
NOTA	None of the Above	9,952	1.05	▲0.19
Majority		58,795	6.21	▼14.52
Turnout		947,000	51.82	▼0.01
INC gain from BJP		Swing		

=== 2019 elections ===
2019 Indian general elections: Allahabad
Party	Candidate	Votes	%	±%
BJP	Rita Bahuguna Joshi	494,454	55.62	+20.43
SP	Rajendra Singh Patel	3,10,179	34.89	+6.65
INC	Yogesh Shukla	31,953	3.59	−7.90
CPI	Giridhar Gopal Tripathi	10,403	1.17	New
NOTA	None of the Above	7,625	0.86	+0.45
Majority		1,84,275	20.73	+13.78
Turnout		8,89,553	51.83	−1.67
BJP hold		Swing	+20.43	

=== 2014 elections ===
2014 Indian general election: Allahabad
Party	Candidate	Votes	%	±%
BJP	Shyama Charan Gupta	313,772	35.19	+24.08
SP	Kunwar Rewati Raman Singh	2,51,763	28.24	−9.70
BSP	Keshari Devi Patel	1,62,073	18.18	−13.46
INC	Nand Gopal Gupta Nandi	1,02,453	11.49	+4.89
IND.	Draupadi Devi	8,321	0.93	+0.93
AAP	Adarsh Shastri	6,439	0.72	+0.72
NOTA	None of the Above	3,624	0.41	+0.41
Majority		62,009	6.95	+0.61
Turnout		8,91,635	53.50	+10.09
BJP gain from SP		Swing	+24.08	

=== 2009 elections ===
2009 Indian general election: Allahabad
Party	Candidate	Votes	%	±%
SP	Kunwar Rewati Raman Singh	209,431	38.06	+2.42
BSP	Ashok Kumar Bajpai	174,511	31.72	+14.72
BJP	Yogesh Shukla	60,983	11.09	−20.23
INC	Shyam Krishna Pandey	33,027	6.73	+0.55
AD(K)	Bihari Lal Sharma	22,086	4.01	+0.14
Independent	Hira Lal	7,537	1.37	
Independent	Abhay Srivastava	5,976	1.09	
Independent	Kusum Kumari	4,236	0.77	
Independent	Akbal Mohammd	2,358	0.43	
Independent	Narendra Kumar Tiwari	2,340	0.43	
RMSP	Om Prakash	2,253	0.41	
NELU	Sarfuddin	2,062	0.37	
Majority		34,920	6.34	+2.02
Turnout		5,50,197	43.41	
SP hold		Swing		

=== 2004 elections ===
2004 Indian general election: Allahabad
Party	Candidate	Votes	%	±%
SP	Kunwar Rewati Raman Singh	2,34,008	35.64	
BJP	Dr. Murli Manohar Joshi	2,05,625	31.32	
BSP	R. K. Singh Patel	1,11,576	17.00	
INC	Satya Prakash Malaviya	40,545	6.18	
AD(K)	Raj Karan Bind	25,426	3.87	
Majority		28,383	4.32	
Turnout		6,56,498	42.13	
SP gain from BJP		Swing		

=== 1999 elections ===
1999 Indian general election: Allahabad
Party	Candidate	Votes	%	±%
BJP	Dr. Murli Manohar Joshi	2,19,114	33.79	
SP	Kunwar Rewati Raman Singh	1,48,783	22.94	
INC	Dr. Rita Bahuguna Joshi	1,33,428	20.57	
BSP	Ram Dular Singh Patel	1,09,383	16.87	
AD(K)	Ram Prakash Singh Patel	15,231	2.35	
Independent	C. P. Srivastava	10,486	1.63	
Independent	Shiv Dutt Shukla	4,002	0.62	
Majority		70,331	10.85	
Turnout		6,48,551	45.98	
BJP hold		Swing		

=== 1998 elections ===
1998 Indian general election: Allahabad
Party	Candidate	Votes	%	±%
BJP	Dr. Murli Manohar Joshi	2,65,232	39.70	
SP	Shyama Charan Gupta	2,21,942	33.22	
BSP	Dr. K. P. Srivastava	1,14,179	17.09	
INC	Dal Bahadur Singh	29,092	4.35	
AD(K)	Dr. Kailash Nath Singh Patel	22,210	3.32	
Majority		43,290	6.48	
Turnout		6,68,083	47.40	
BJP hold		Swing		

=== 1996 elections ===
1996 Indian general election: Allahabad
Party	Candidate	Votes	%	±%
BJP	Murli Manohar Joshi	2,16,844	42.71	
JD	Saroj Dubey	1,13,321	22.32	
BSP	Ram Sewak Singh	1,02,352	20.16	
INC	Jagdish Narayan Mishra	30,007	5.91	
Independent	Vijay Shankar	7,827	1.54	
Majority		1,03,523	20.39	
Turnout		5,07,695	36.48	
BJP gain from JD		Swing		

=== 1991 elections ===
1991 Indian general election: Allahabad
Party	Candidate	Votes	%	±%
JD	Saroj Dubey	1,14,898	29.72	
BJP	Shyama Charan Gupta	1,09,702	28.38	
INC	Anil Shastri	61,488	15.91	
BSP	Jang Bahadur Singh Patel	56,279	14.56	
JP	Moti Lal Kushwaha	21,549	5.57	
Majority		5,196	1.34	
Turnout		3,86,549	39.27	
JD hold		Swing		

=== 1989 elections ===
1989 Indian general election
Party	Candidate	Votes	%	±%
JD	Janeshwar Mishra	1,78,508	42.92	
INC	Kamala Bahuguna	1,39,568	33.56	
BSP	Jang Bahadur Singh Patel	79,004	19.00	
Independent	Rama Kant	2,690	0.65	
Independent	Shasharka Mishra	2,193	0.53	
Majority		38,940	9.36	
Turnout		4,15,896	43.26	
JD gain from Jan Morcha		Swing		

=== 1988 bye-poll elections ===
By Election, 1988
Party	Candidate	Votes	%	±%
Jan Morcha	V. P. Singh	2,02,996	52.03	
INC	Sunil Shastri	92,245	23.64	
BSP	Kanshi Ram	69,517	17.82	
Independent	Hari Shankar	2,067	0.53	
Independent	L. Sharma	1,917	0.49	
Majority		1,10,751	28.39	
Turnout		3,90,091		
Jan Morcha gain from INC		Swing		

=== 1984 elections ===
1984 Indian general election
Party	Candidate	Votes	%	±%
INC	Amitabh Bachchan	2,97,461	68.21	
LKD	Hemwati Nandan Bahuguna	1,09,666	25.15	
Majority		1,87,795	43.06	
Turnout		4,36,120	56.08	
INC hold		Swing		

=== 1977 elections ===
1977 Indian general election
Party	Candidate	Votes	%	±%
JP	Janeshwar Mishra	1,90,697	57.71	
INC	V. P. Singh	1,00,709	30.48	
ABHM	Om Prakash Nirala	14,761	4.47	
Independent	Kripal Singh	7,363	2.23	
Independent	Govind Mishra	4,297	1.30	
Majority		89,988	27.23	
Turnout		3,30,419	52.85	
JP gain from INC		Swing		

=== 1971 elections ===
1971 Indian general election
Party	Candidate	Votes	%	±%
INC	Hemwati Nandan Bahuguna	1,42,886	58.84%	
INC(O)	Mangala Prasad Tiwari	46,998	19.35%	
BKD	Prem Chandra	13,152	5.42%	
ABHM	Braj Narain (Brajesh)	11,742	4.84%	
Majority		68,533	28.98	
Turnout		2,50,213	46.50%	
INC hold		Swing		

=== 1967 elections ===
1967 Indian general election
Party	Candidate	Votes	%	±%
INC	Hari Krishna Shastri	1,14,131	49.23%	
SSP	Salikram Jaiswal	97,587	42.10%	
ABJS	H. L. Pandey	20,102	8.67%	
Majority		16,544	7.10%	
Turnout		2,43,634	51.80%	
INC hold		Swing		

=== 1962 elections ===
1962 Indian general election
Party	Candidate	Votes	%	±%
INC	Lal Bahadur Shastri	1,37,324	58.07	
ABJS	Ram Gopal Sand	68,791	29.09	
Independent	Mubarak Mazdoor	30,373	12.84	
Majority		68,533	28.98	
Turnout		2,36,488	53.01	
INC hold		Swing		

=== 1957 elections ===
1957 Indian general election
Party	Candidate	Votes	%	±%
INC	Lal Bahadur Shastri	1,24,896	58.41	
PSP	Radhey Shyam Pathak	68,864	32.21	
Majority		56,032	26.20	
Turnout		2,13,814	51.50	
INC hold		Swing		

== See also ==
- List of mayors of Prayagraj
- List of constituencies of the Lok Sabha

Lok Sabha
Preceded by Sabarkantha	Constituency represented by the prime minister 1964-1966	Succeeded by Sabarkantha
