= Shyama Charan Gupta =

Indian politician (1945–2021)

Member of Parliament, Lok Sabha
- In office 16 May 2014 – 23 May 2019
- Preceded by: Rewati Raman Singh
- Succeeded by: Rita Bahuguna Joshi
- Constituency: Allahabad

Member of Parliament, Lok Sabha
- In office 13 May 2004 – 16 May 2009
- Preceded by: Ram Sajeevan
- Succeeded by: R. K. Singh Patel
- Constituency: Banda

Personal details
- Born: 9 February 1945 Chitrakoot, United Provinces, British India
- Died: 9 April 2021 (aged 76) Delhi, India
- Party: Bhartiya Janata Party (1991–1998, 2014–2019); Samajwadi Party (1998–2014, 2019–2021)
- Profession: Industrialist; Politician; Philanthropist
- Website: www.shyamgroup.org

Shyama Charan Gupta (9 February 1945 – 9 April 2021) was an Indian politician from the Bharatiya Janata Party, entrepreneur, and Member of Parliament representing Allahabad (Lok Sabha constituency) in the North Indian state of Uttar Pradesh. He was the founder of Shyama Group of companies, established in 1973.

== Early life and education ==
Shyama Charan Gupta was born in Unchadih, District Chitrakoot (Uttar Pradesh) on February 9, 1945. He was educated in a nearby village Manikpur till High School, completed Intermediate from Allahabad. His academic qualifications include B.A, LL.B. from Kanpur and Lucknow subsequently.

== Political career ==
Shyama Charan Gupta contested the parliamentary elections for the first time from Banda as an Independent candidate in 1984 and came third. His second parliamentary election was from Allahabad in 1991 on BJP ticket. He lost to Janata Dal's Saroj Dubey by 5,196 votes. In 1996, he campaigned for Murli Manohar Joshi only to challenge him in 1998 Lok Sabha elections as Samajwadi Party candidate. After losing the poll, he shifted to Banda (Lok Sabha constituency) in 1999 general elections. On 28 August 1989, he was elected as Mayor of Allahabad. He was elected the Mayor of Allahabad after a gap of 19 years, it was a prestigious election which he won as an independent candidate with the support of then Janta Dal. He emerged as a solid and a powerful Baniya Leader of Eastern UP during that time. In 2004, Shyama Charan was elected to the 14th Lok Sabha from Banda parliamentary constituency on the ticket of Samajwadi Party. He unsuccessfully fought from Phulpur in 2009 general election, losing to his Bahujan Samaj Party rival by a margin of less than 15,000 votes. In 2014 general election he won from Allahabad on a BJP ticket.

Gupta dropped hints of his dissatisfaction with Mulayam Singh Yadav’s party when one of his sons joined the Bhartiya Janata Party in January, 2014, reportedly at his insistence. He resigned from Samajwadi Party and joined BJP to contest the 2014 Lok Sabha election from Allahabad. He won the elections getting 313,772 votes, a margin of 62,009 votes over incumbent MP Rewati Raman Singh of the SP. He was a member in the Committee on Finance, Committee for the Ministry of Mines & Steel, Committee on Subordinate Legislation. Also previously during his tenure as Member of Parliament from Banda, between 2004 and 2009, he was on the Standing Committee of Finance and on the Consultative Committee of Food Processing.

== Business career ==
He established Shyama Group of companies in 1973, which was involved in Bidi manufacturing and has stakes in hospitality and real estate sectors.

== Personal life ==
Shyama Charan Gupta was married to Jamunotri Gupta.

He died from COVID-19 on 9 April 2021, aged 76.

Lok Sabha
Preceded by Rewati Raman Singh	Member of Parliament from Allahabad; 2014 – 2019	Succeeded by Rita Bahuguna Joshi
