= Raj Ghat and associated memorials =

Memorial in Delhi, India

Raj Ghat
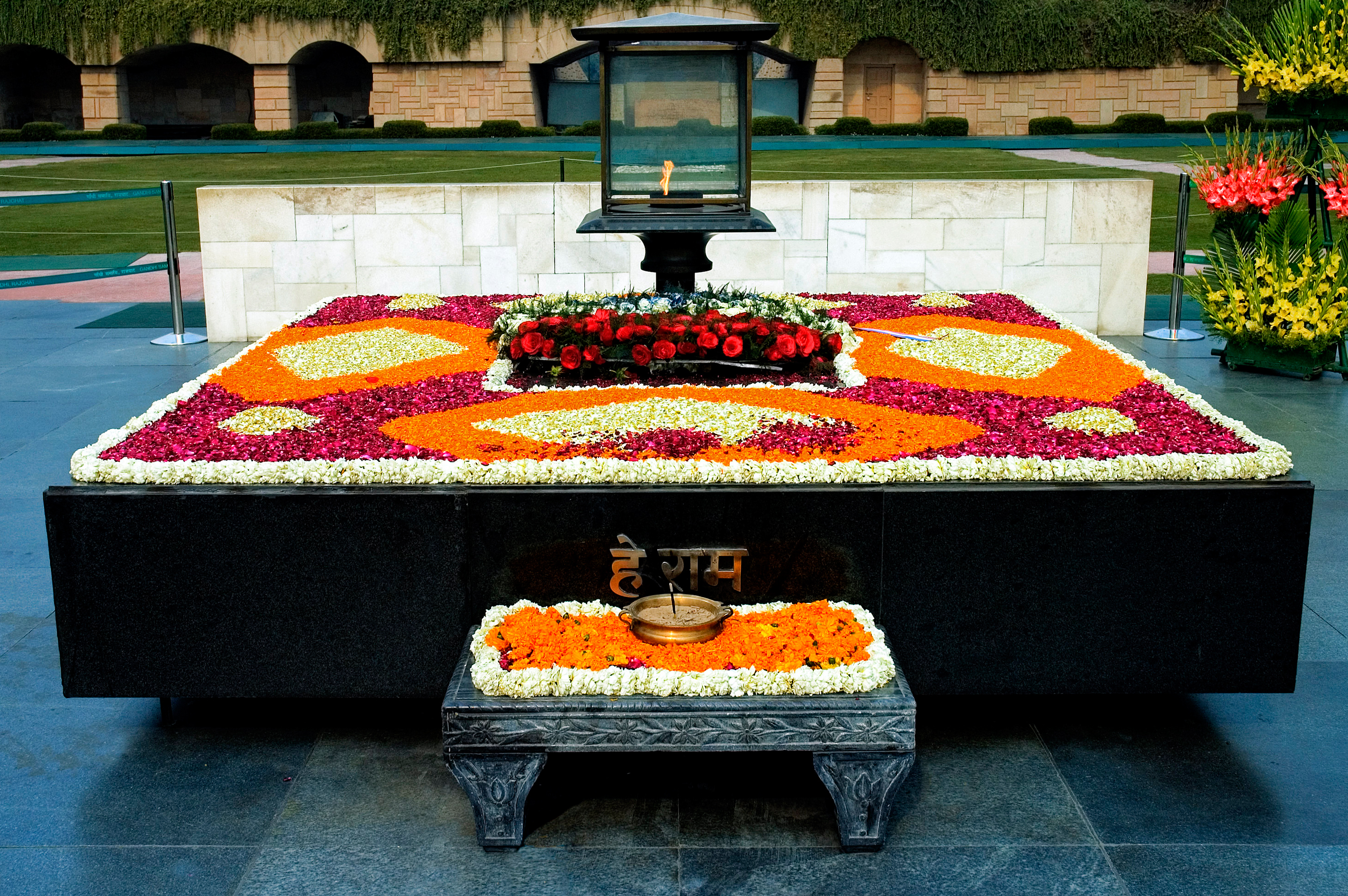
- Memorial of Mahatma Gandhi at Raj Ghat
- Interactive map of the Raj Ghat area

General information
- Type: Tomb
- Location: Ring Road, behind Red Fort Shahjahanabad, Gandhi Smriti, Raj Ghat, New Delhi, Delhi, 110002
- Coordinates: 28°38′25.8″N 77°14′57.6″E
- Groundbreaking: 1948

Raj Ghat is a memorial complex in New Delhi, though part of Central Delhi, Delhi, India.

The first memorial there was dedicated to Mahatma Gandhi, where a black marble platform was raised to mark the location of his cremation on 31 January 1948 and consists of an eternal flame at one end. Located on Delhi's Ring Road, a stone footpath leads to the walled enclosure that houses the memorial. Later, the memorial complex was expanded to include memorials for other prominent Indian leaders including Charan Singh, Jawaharlal Nehru, Lal Bahadur Shastri, Indira Gandhi, Rajiv Gandhi, Chandra Shekhar and Atal Bihari Vajpayee.

== Etymology ==
Raj Ghat loosely translates to Royal Steps with the word "royal" alluding to the importance of the place and "steps" referencing the climb from the banks of the Yamuna river.

== Location ==
Raj Ghat was the name of a location of historic ghat just outside Shahjahanabad (Old Delhi) on the west bank of the Yamuna River east of Daryaganj.

== List of memorials ==
The first memorial was dedicated to Mahatma Gandhi and sited on the spot where his remains were cremated on 31 January 1948. It consists of a black marble platform with an eternal flame at one end. A stone footpath leads to the walled enclosure that houses the memorial. Later the memorial complex was expanded to include several other samadhis for various leaders in the vicinity of Raj Ghat. The landscaping and planting of these memorials were originally performed by Alick Percy-Lancaster, Superintendent of Horticultural operations with the Government of India.

In 2000, the government of India under Atal Bihari Vajpayee decided not to create separate memorials for different leaders as the existing memorials already occupied over 245 acres of prime land in Delhi.

Name	Title/Position	Date of death	Memorial name (Meaning in English)	Image
Mahatma Gandhi	Father of the Nation (India)	30 January 1948	Raj Ghat (Royal Platform)	
Jawaharlal Nehru	First Prime Minister of India	27 May 1964	Shantivan (Forest of Peace)	
Lal Bahadur Shastri	Second Prime Minister of India	11 January 1966	Vijay Ghat (Victory Platform)	
Sanjay Gandhi	Former member of parliament	23 June 1980	Samadhi of Sanjay Gandhi (Tomb of Sanjay Gandhi)	
Indira Gandhi	Third Prime Minister of India	31 October 1984	Shakti Sthal (Place of Strength)	
Jagjivan Ram	Fourth Deputy Prime Minister of India	6 July 1986	Samta Sthal (Place of Equality)	
Charan Singh	Fifth Prime Minister of India	29 May 1987	Kisan Ghat (Farmer Platform)	
Rajiv Gandhi	Sixth Prime Minister of India	21 May 1991	Vir Bhumi (Land of Brave)	
Lalita Shastri	Spouse of Lal Bahadur Shastri	13 April 1993	Samadhi of Lalita Shastri (Tomb of Lalita Shastri)	
Zail Singh	Seventh President of India	25 December 1994	Ekta Sthal (Place of Unity)	
Shankar Dayal Sharma	Ninth President of India	26 December 1999	Karma Bhumi (Land of Duty)	
Devi Lal	Sixth Deputy Prime Minister of India	6 April 2001	Sangharsh Sthal (Place of Struggle)	
P. V. Narasimha Rao	Ninth Prime Minister of India	23 December 2004	Gyan Bhumi (Land of Knowledge)	
K. R. Narayanan	Tenth President of India	9 November 2005	Uday Bhumi (Land of Dawn)	
Chandra Shekhar	Eighth Prime Minister of India	8 July 2007	Jannayak Sthal (Place of People's Leader)	
Ramaswamy Venkataraman	Eighth President of India	27 January 2009	Ekta Sthal (Place of Unity)	
Inder Kumar Gujral	Twelfth Prime Minister of India	30 November 2012	Smriti Sthal (Place of Remembrance)	
Atal Bihari Vajpayee	Tenth Prime Minister of India	16 August 2018	Sadaiv Atal (Firm Forever)	
Pranab Mukherjee	Thirteenth President of India	31 August 2020	Rashtriya Smriti (National Memory)	

== Controversies ==
The hard materials used in the memorial have raised questions about the nature of Gandhian architecture, specifically the stark difference between the architecture of Raj Ghat and a Gandhian low-cost housing architecture.
