= Pavan Choudary =

Indian writer and television host (born 1965)

- Born: 29 August 1965 (age 61); Sagar, Madhya Pradesh, India
- Occupation: Author
- Writing career
- Genre: non-fiction
- Website: www.pavanchoudary.in

Pavan Choudary (born 29 August 1965) is an Indian writer, TV talk-show host, TEDx speaker, and CEO. He has written several books including How a Good Person can Really Win (Earlier version- When you are sinking become a submarine- Winning Through Wisdom and Creativity), Machiavelli for Moral People, Broom and Groom (co-author Kiran Bedi) and The Rx Factor.

Choudary also hosts the TV show Hum Aisey Kyun Hain on Doordarshan and has written columns for The Times of India (Gurgaon), the Financial Chronicle and Firstpost. He is the managing director of Vygon India, a French multinational company.

== Personal life ==
Choudary was born on 29 August 1965 in Sagar, Madhya Pradesh, India. He received his education at Bal Bharti Air Force School Delhi and St. Joseph Convent School, Sagar, Madhya Pradesh. He obtained graduation in Pharmacy honours from Sagar University and MBA from Shimla University. He is married to his college friend Anu Choudary.

== Career ==
=== Early career ===
Choudary began his career joining the Jagsonpal Pharmaceuticals in 1988, switched to advertising field and again came back to the pharmaceutical sector, in Cadila Pharmaceuticals. Later he joined the Indian multinational, Dabur Pharmaceuticals as a Marketing Manager.

=== CEO and managing director ===
Pavan is the CEO and managing director of Vygon India Pvt. Ltd., a leading French Multinational company in Healthcare. When he joined Vygon in 1997, he was amongst the youngest CEOs to head a multinational in India. He is also an active member of the worldwide strategy planning effort of Vygon and spearheads Vygon's M&A initiative in India.

=== Author ===
Choudary writes on wisdom and on different subjects including Social reforms. His recent book, How a Good Person can Really Win (Earlier version- When you are sinking become a submarine- Winning Through Wisdom and Creativity) describes how a principled man can win against an unprincipled person through wisdom and creativity. His book, The Rx Factor – Strategic Creativity in Pharmaceutical Marketing is a seminal work on marketing and strategy in healthcare. Pavan's books have also been translated into Hindi, Marathi, Gujarati, Bengali, Tamil, Kannada, Telugu and Malayalam.

He co-authored two books with Kiran Bedi; Broom & Groom – a classic on Hygiene and manners for a social renaissance of civil behaviour, and Uprising 2011: Indians Against Corruption – an assembled chronicle of the civil-society supported anti-corruption movement in India.

Success Sutras for the 21st Century: A Trilogy of Wisdom (Set of 3 Hardback books – Chanakya's Political Wisdom, Kabir's Spiritual Wisdom and Confucius’ Social Wisdom) is a political, social and spiritual commentary by Choudary that describes how to achieve Political sharpness, Social order and Spiritual bliss for the common man as well as for the statesman/politician.

=== TV Host and Columnist ===
Pavan hosts the nation-building TV program on social and civic reform Hum Aisey Kyun Hain on Doordarshan and writes a popular column (at present in recess) for The Times of India on civic reform.

=== Teaching ===
Pavan has lectured at the Indian Institutes of Management (IIM) at Ahmedabad, Lucknow and Kozhikode; the Sardar Vallabh Bhai Patel National Police Academy, Hyderabad; the Lal Bahadur Shastri National Academy of Administration, Mussoorie; Sydney Technical University; Singapore Management University and other prestigious institutes in India and abroad. He has also addressed the senior management of several leading companies from across the world.

== Bibliography ==
- The Rx Factor – Strategic Creativity in Pharmaceutical Marketing, Sage Publications, 1997: ISBN 978-0-8039-9378-5, Hardcover: ISBN 978-0-8039-9379-2, Paperback: ISBN 978-81-7036-627-0, New edition, Wisdom Village Publications: ISBN 9788190655583
- When you are Sinking become a Submarine, Wisdom Tree, 2007, ISBN 9788183280525, New edition, Wisdom Village Publications, 2006, ISBN 9789380710006
- Success Sutras for the 21st Century: A Trilogy of Wisdom, Wisdom Village Publications, 2009, ISBN 9788190655545
- Chanakya's Political Wisdom, Wisdom Village Publications, 2009, ISBN 9788190655507
- Kabir's Spiritual Wisdom, Wisdom Village Publications, 2009, ISBN 9788190655521
- Confucius' Social Wisdom, Wisdom Village Publications, 2009, ISBN 9788190655552
- Broom & Groom (co-author Kiran Bedi), Wisdom Village Publications, 2010, ISBN 9789380710013
- Machiavelli for Moral People, Wisdom Village Publications, 2012, ISBN 9789380710112
- Uprising 2011 (co-author Kiran Bedi), Wisdom Village Publications, 2013, ISBN 9789380710440
- How a Good Person can Really Win, Wisdom Village Publications, 2013, ISBN 9789380710457
- Lal Bahadur Shastri – Lessons in Leadership, (co-author Anil Shastri) Wisdom Village Publications, 2014, ISBN 9789380710365
- India Protests (co-author Kiran Bedi), Wisdom Village Publications, 2014, ISBN 9789380710372
- Swachh Bharat Checklist (co-author Kiran Bedi), Wisdom Village Publications, 2015, ISBN 9789380710600

== See also ==
- List of Indian writers
