= Broom & Groom =

Book by Pavan Choudary and Kiran Bedi

- Author: Pavan Choudary and Kiran Bedi
- Language: English
- Genre: Personality Development
- Publisher: Wisdom Village Publications
- Publication place: India
- Media type: Print (Hardbound)
- ISBN: 9789380710013
- Website: www.broomandgroom.in

Broom & Groom, by co-authors Pavan Choudary and Kiran Bedi, is a 2010 book on hygiene and manners intended to awaken "the right to civic sense" among the people of India. The book became a best-seller within six months of its launch. On a literal level, "broom" is used for cleaning house and "groom" for civility.

== Summary ==
Through illustrations and graphics, the book provides readers with various examples of uncivilized behaviour. It was released in August 2010 at the press club in New Delhi. At the launch, the authors noted, "The fundamental thought behind the book is to trigger a civic sense movement where the people in power and the public come together and once and for all change the conditions we live in."

The book aims to help corporate sector employees differentiate themselves from competition, encourage children to excel at social interactions, and help students distinguish themselves at interviews. Broom & Groom has been well-received across India by large corporations such as G4S, Maruti, and Torrent, institutes such as Bharatiya Vidyapeeth, and many schools across the country.

It has been translated into Hindi, Marathi, Gujarati, Bengali, Telugu, Tamil, Kannada and Malayalam.

Commenting on the book, A. P. J. Abdul Kalam, former President of India said, "Every citizen of the nation, from all walks of life, needs to have a disciplined life. This book will contribute to creating an awareness among all in setting their own standards in disciplining their lives leading to good life, good society, and thereby a good nation."

== Synopsis ==
This book is divided into two main categories: grooming and brooming. Under grooming, the book covers areas such as how to greet guests appropriately, how to handle hierarchy in both office and personal settings, and how to converse effectively. It further details how to be a good host and guest; social interaction etiquette; dining manners; mobile manners; restaurant manners; parking etiquette; how to behave while driving or walking on roads, in public places such as offices, lifts, airports, cinema halls, hospitals, and classrooms; and how to behave around VIPS, foreigners, teachers, and house help. Grooming includes how to maintain physical appearance, how to keep one's office, bathroom manners, day-to-day decency, and how to maintain the kitchen.
