= Haji Parvej Ahmad =

Indian politician

Haji Parvez Ahmad

Member of the Legislative Assembly
- In office 2012–2017
- Preceded by: Nand Gopal Gupta
- Succeeded by: Nand Gopal Gupta
- Constituency: Allahabad South constituency

Personal details
- Born: 14 January 1963 (age 63)
- Spouse: Yasmeen Akhtar
- Children: 3
- Education: Bishop Johnson School And College University of Allahabad

Haji Parvez Ahmad is a Samajwadi Party politician who has served as a Member of the Legislative Assembly in the state of Uttar Pradesh, India. He was elected by a margin of 414 votes to the Legislative Assembly of Uttar Pradesh in 2012 from Allahabad South constituency, when his closest rival was Nand Gopal Gupta of the Bahujan Samaj Party (BSP). He lost the same seat to Gupta, who had moved from the BSP to the Bharatiya Janata Party, in the 2017 elections. The winning margin on that occasion was 28,587 votes.
