= List of mayors of Prayagraj =

Prayagraj Mayoral Constituency is one of the 14 mayoral constituencies of Uttar Pradesh.

== Total Number of Voters ==
Election	Polling Stations	Male Voters	Female Voters	Total Voters
2017	216	6,04,854	4,69,734	10,74,588

== List of Mayors ==
Year	Member	Political Party
1995	Prof. Rita Bahuguna Joshi	Independent
2000	Dr. K. P. Srivastava	Samajwadi Party
2006	Ch. Jitendra Nath Singh	Indian National Congress
2012	Abhilasha Gupta Nandi	Independent
2017	Abhilasha Gupta Nandi	Bharatiya Janata Party
2023	Ganesh Chandra Kesarwani	Bharatiya Janata Party

== Election results ==
Uttar Pradesh Local Body Election, 2023: Allahabad
Party	Candidate	Votes	%	±%
BJP	Ganesh Kesarwani	235,675	47.66	
SP	Ajay Kumar Srivastava	106,286	21.50	
INC	Prabha Mishra	40,486	8.19	
BSP	Saeed Ahmad	36,799	7.44	
AIMIM	Phool Chandra Dubey	10,086	3.10	
AAP	Salil Srivastava	4,695	1.44	
NOTA	None of the Above	1,544	0.47	
Majority		129,351	26.16	
Turnout		494,471	31.45	
BJP hold		Swing		

Uttar Pradesh Local Body Election, 2017: Allahabad
Party	Candidate	Votes	%	±%
BJP	Abhilasha Gupta	1,31,297	40.30	
SP	Vinod Chandra Dubey	67,913	20.84	
INC	Vijay Mishra	64,579	19.82	
BSP	Ramesh Chandra Kesarwani	24,969	7.66	
IND.	Phool Chandra Dubey	10,086	3.10	
AAP	Salil Srivastava	4,695	1.44	
NOTA	None of the Above	1,544	0.47	
Majority		63,384	19.46	
Turnout		3,25,811	30.32	
BJP gain from Independent		Swing		
