= Rewati Raman Singh =

Indian politician

Kunwar Rewati Raman Singh

Member of Parliament, Rajya Sabha for Uttar Pradesh
- In office 5 July 2016 – 4 July 2022
- Preceded by: Kanak Lata Singh
- Succeeded by: Kapil Sibal

Member of Parliament, Lok Sabha
- In office 2004 – 2014
- Preceded by: Murli Manohar Joshi
- Succeeded by: Shyama Charan Gupta
- Constituency: Allahabad

Personal details
- Born: 5 October 1943 (age 82) Allahabad, United Provinces, British India
- Party: SP
- Other political affiliations: Janata Dal
- Spouse: Beena Singh
- Children: 2 (including Ujjwal Raman Singh)
- Education: University of Allahabad
- Website: http://rajyasabha.nic.in

Kunwar Rewati Raman Singh (born 5 October 1943) is an Indian politician from the Prayagraj Lok Sabha Constituency in Uttar Pradesh. He played a major role and was the co-founder of the Samajwadi Party with SP supremo Mulayam Singh Yadav, Beni Prasad Verma and Azam Khan.

He was the national secretary of Samajwadi Party. He has served Karachhana, the Vidhan Sabha constituency of Allahabad more than 7 times as a Member of the Legislative Assembly (MLA). He was also elected as a Member of Parliament (Lok Sabha) from Allahabad twice after defeating the popular BJP politician, Murali Manohar Joshi in 2004 general elections. He has now been elected as an MP (Rajya Sabha) from Uttar Pradesh. He was made irrigation minister and environment minister.

== Early life ==
Rewati Raman Singh was born in a Bhumihar family. He actively took part in the JP Movement against emergency imposed by Indira Gandhi. He had also worked with Minister of External Affairs Sushma Swaraj, Chief minister of Uttar Pradesh Yogi Adityanath and many other leaders to clean the holy Ganges river. He had worked with many popular leaders like former prime minister V. P. Singh, Chandra Shekhar, and Raj Narain.

== Positions held ==
- Member, Public Accounts Committee
- Leader of opposition, Uttar Pradesh Legislative Assembly (from 6 December 1991 to 6 December 1992)
- Member of Parliament from Allahabad (Lok Sabha constituency) two terms (2004 and 2009)
- Member of Parliament Rajya Sabha from Uttar Pradesh from 2016 to 2022
