= Allahabad South Assembly constituency =

Constituency of the Uttar Pradesh legislative assembly in India

Coordinates: 25.35°N 81.85°E

Allahabad South
- Constituency No. 263 for the Uttar Pradesh Legislative Assembly

Constituency details
- Country: India
- Region: North India
- State: Uttar Pradesh
- District: Prayagraj
- Lok Sabha constituency: Allahabad
- Total electors: 399,776(2019)
- Reservation: None

Member of Legislative Assembly
- 18th Uttar Pradesh Legislative Assembly
- Incumbent Nand Gopal Gupta
- Party: Bharatiya Janata Party
- Elected year: 2022

Allahabad South is one of five assembly constituencies in the Allahabad Lok Sabha constituency. Since 2008, this assembly constituency is numbered 263 amongst 403 constituencies.

Currently this seat belongs to Bharatiya Janta Party candidate Nand Gopal Gupta Nandi who won in last Assembly election of 2022 Uttar Pradesh Legislative Elections defeating Samajwadi Party candidate Raish Chandra Shukla by a margin of 26,182 votes.

== Members of Legislative Assembly ==
Year	Member	Party
1957	Kalyan Chandra Mohiley	Praja Socialist Party
1962	Kalyan Chandra Mohiley	Praja Socialist Party
1967	Kalyan Chandra Mohiley	Samyukta Socialist Party
1969	Ram Gopal Sand	Bharatiya Jana Sangh
1974	Satya Prakash Malaviya	Bharatiya Kranti Dal
1977	Satya Prakash Malaviya	Janata Party
1980	Satish Chandra Jaiswal	Indian National Congress (I)
1985	Satish Chandra Jaiswal	Indian National Congress
1989	Keshari Nath Tripathi	Bharatiya Janata Party
1991	Keshari Nath Tripathi	Bharatiya Janata Party
1993	Keshari Nath Tripathi	Bharatiya Janata Party
1996	Keshari Nath Tripathi	Bharatiya Janata Party
2002	Keshari Nath Tripathi	Bharatiya Janata Party
2007	Nand Gopal Gupta	Bahujan Samaj Party
2012	Haji Parvej Ahmad	Samajwadi Party
2017	Nand Gopal Gupta	Bharatiya Janata Party
2022	Nand Gopal Gupta	Bharatiya Janata Party

== Election results ==
=== 2027 ===
2027 Uttar Pradesh Legislative Assembly election: Allahabad South
Party	Candidate	Votes	%	±%
INDIA				
NDA				
BSP				
NOTA	None of the above			
Majority				
Turnout				
gain from		Swing		

=== 2022 ===
2022 Uttar Pradesh Legislative Assembly election: Prayagraj South
Party	Candidate	Votes	%	±%
BJP	Nand Gopal Gupta	97,864	54.14	▲1.61
SP	Raish Chandra Shukla	71,682	39.66	▲3.28
BSP	Devendra Mishra Alias Nagraha	4,208	2.33	▼4.54
INC	Alpana Nishad	2,098	1.16	
NOTA	None of the above	831	0.46	▲0.08
Majority		26,182	14.48	▼1.67
Turnout		180,745	44.27	▼0.89
BJP hold		Swing		

=== 2017 ===
2017 Uttar Pradesh Legislative Assembly election: Prayagraj South
Party	Candidate	Votes	%	±%
BJP	Nand Gopal Gupta	93,011	52.53	
SP	Haji Parvej Ahmad	64,424	36.38	
BSP	Masooq Khan	12,162	6.87	
NOTA	None of the above	665	0.38	
Majority		28,587	16.15	
Turnout		177,063	45.16	
BJP gain from SP		Swing		

=== 2012 ===
2012 Uttar Pradesh state assembly election: Prayagraj South
Party	Candidate	Votes	%	±%
SP	Haji Parvej Ahmad	43,040	29.44	
BSP	Nand Gopal Gupta	42,626	29.16	
BJP	Keshari Nath Tripathi	33,399	22.85	
INC	Ch. Jitendra Nath Singh	19,121	13.08	
PECP	Mohd. Julfikar Khan	4,092	2.80	
Majority		414	0.28	
Turnout		1,46,174	45.05	
SP gain from BSP		Swing		
