= Aditya Dubey =

Indian environmental activist (born 2003)

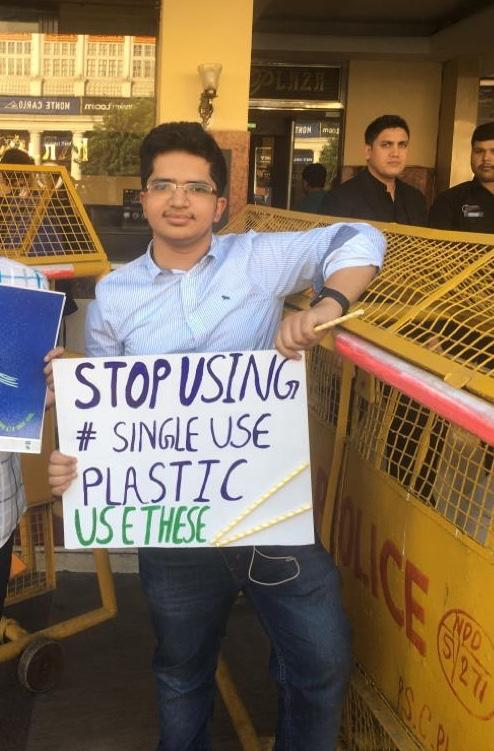
- Aditya Dubey at a protest against single use plastic at PVR, New Delhi
- Born: 27 March 2003 (age 23); New Delhi, India
- Occupation: Environmental activist
- Relatives: Saroj Dubey (grandmother)
- Awards: The Diana Award in 2021

Aditya Dubey is an Indian environmental activist. He is a recipient of the Diana Award in 2021. In August 2020, Dubey filed a petition with the Supreme Court of India, requesting the apex court to help farmers with free stubble-removing machines that could result in reduction in stubble burning which is considered a major cause of air pollution in Delhi. He also reached out to the Chief Ministers of Delhi, Punjab and Haryana, seeking end to fines or police actions for stubble burning.

The plea was addressed by the Supreme Court and a three judge bench formed a committee led by judge Madan B Lokur to monitor the situation. An ordinance ‘Commission For Management Of Air Quality in Delhi & Adjoining Areas, 2020 was eventually promulgated to handle the air pollution problem in Delhi and nearby areas. Dubey was also part of the 'No Car Sunday' initiative in Delhi that promoted giving up use of personal vehicles for a day.

== Early life and work ==
Aditya was born to Anurag Dubey and Anu Dubey in New Delhi in 2003. His grandfather Dr. Justice J.N. Dubey was a judge and grandmother the late Saroj Dubey was an Indian politician. Aditya passed his senior secondary exams in 2021 from the Modern School Barakahamba Road, New Delhi. Having suffered poor health and problems with lungs because of the air pollution in Delhi, NCR motivated Dubey to work for the environment. He started the Plant a Million trees initiative in 2016. In 2019, Dubey had filed a complaint against the Amazon, Flipkart. The complaint was filed with National Green tribunals and concerned about the excessive use of plastic and card boxes for product deliveries. He later worked against the single-use plastic in collaboration with the Central Pollution Control Board.

During the Covid Pandemic he launched the Covid Hunger Helpline with his friends which provided food and rations to the underprivileged classes who were suffering due to the lockdown.

== Awards and recognition ==
Aditya won the UK prestigious Diana Legacy Award in 2021 for taking an initiative that led to planting of over 180,000 trees.
