= Karachhana Assembly constituency =

Constituency of the Uttar Pradesh legislative assembly in India

Coordinates: 25.27°N 81.95°E

Karachhana
- Constituency No. 260 for the Uttar Pradesh Legislative Assembly

Constituency details
- Country: India
- Region: North India
- State: Uttar Pradesh
- District: Prayagraj
- Total electors: 335,550 (2019)
- Reservation: None

Member of Legislative Assembly
- 18th Uttar Pradesh Legislative Assembly
- Incumbent Piyush Ranjan Nishad
- Party: Bharatiya Janata Party
- Elected year: 2022

Karachhana is a constituency of the Uttar Pradesh Legislative Assembly covering the city of Karachhana in the Prayagraj district of Uttar Pradesh, India.

Karachhana is one of five assembly constituencies in the Prayagraj Lok Sabha constituency. Since 2008, this assembly constituency is numbered 260 amongst 403 constituencies.

== Members of Legislative Assembly ==
Year	Name	Party
1993	Nand Lal Patel	Bahujan Samaj Party
1996	Rewati Raman Singh	Samajwadi Party
2002	Rewati Raman Singh	Samajwadi Party
2004★	Ujjwal Raman Singh	Samajwadi Party
2007	Anand Kumar	Bahujan Samaj Party
2012	Deepak Patel	Bahujan Samaj Party
2017	Ujjwal Raman Singh	Samajwadi Party
2022	Piyush Ranjan Nishad	Bharatiya Janata Party

★By Election

== Election results ==
=== 2027 ===
2027 Uttar Pradesh Legislative Assembly election: Karachhana
Party	Candidate	Votes	%	±%
INDIA				
NDA				
BSP				
NOTA	None of the above			
Majority				
Turnout				
gain from		Swing		

=== 2022 ===
Bharatiya Janta Party candidate Piyush Ranjan Nishad won in 2022 Uttar Pradesh Legislative Assembly election defeating Samajwadi Party candidate Ujjwal Raman Singh by a margin of 9,584 votes and Bahujan Samaj Party candidate Arvind Kumar Shukla stood third place by getting 21,930 votes.

2022 Uttar Pradesh Legislative Assembly Election: Karachhan
Party	Candidate	Votes	%	±%
BJP	Piyush Ranjan Nishad	89,527	44.06	+10.96
SP	Ujjwal Raman Singh	80,199	39.47	−1.19
BSP	Arvind Kumar Shukla	21,950	10.8	−9.83
INC	Rinki Patel	4,343	2.14	
NOTA	None of the above	1,891	0.93	−0.24
Majority		9,328	4.59	−2.97
Turnout		203,189	58.06	−1.86
BJP gain from SP		Swing		

=== 2017 ===
Samajwadi Party candidate Ujjwal Raman Singh won in 2017 Uttar Pradesh Legislative Elections defeating Bharatiya Janta Party candidate Piyush Ranjan Nishad by a margin of 15,024 votes.

2017 Uttar Pradesh Legislative Assembly Election: Karachhan
Party	Candidate	Votes	%	±%
SP	Ujjwal Raman Singh	80,806	40.66	
BJP	Piyush Ranjan Nishad Sonu	65,782	33.1	
BSP	Deepak Patel	40,998	20.63	
NOTA	None of the above	2,308	1.17	
Majority		15,024	7.56	
Turnout		198,734	59.92	
