= Ujjwal Raman Singh =

Indian politician

Member of Parliament, Lok Sabha
- Incumbent
- Assumed office 4 June 2024
- Preceded by: Rita Bahuguna Joshi
- Constituency: Allahabad

Cabinet Minister: Environment Department, Government of Uttar Pradesh
- In office 2004–2007
- Ministry: Third Mulayam Singh Yadav ministry

Member of the Uttar Pradesh Legislative Assembly
- In office 2017–2022
- Preceded by: Deepak Patel
- Succeeded by: Piyush Ranjan Nishad
- Constituency: Karachana
- In office 2004–2007
- Preceded by: Rewati Raman Singh
- Succeeded by: Anand Kumar
- Constituency: Karachana

Personal details
- Born: 16 February 1973 (age 53) Allahabad, Uttar Pradesh, India
- Party: Indian National Congress
- Spouse: Nitu Singh
- Children: Devishi Singh, Anant Singh
- Parent: Kunwar Rewati Raman Singh
- Education: Faculty of Law (Campus Law Centre), St. Stephen’s College, Delhi University
- Profession: Politician

Ujjwal Raman Singh is an Indian politician from Indian National Congress. He is currently serving as Member of Parliament, Lok Sabha from Allahabad. He was former Cabinet Minister Environment Department in the Government of Uttar Pradesh. He was a member of Uttar Pradesh Legislative Assembly in 2004 to 2007 and 2013 to 2017 from Karachana.

He represented the Karachana constituency of Uttar Pradesh as a member of the Samajwadi Party. Ujjwal Raman Singh is the son of senior Samajwadi Party leader Rewati Raman Singh. On 2 April 2024 he joined Indian National Congress. He was elected to 18th Lok Sabha from Prayagraj.

== Political career ==
Ujjwal Raman Singh was elected as an MLA from Karachana in 2004 on Samajwadi Party's ticket as his father left the seat after becoming an MP.

Singh had also served the state as the environment minister in Mulayam Singh Yadav's government and launched Compressed natural gas in Agra, Lucknow and Kanpur. He also served as Chairman of 'Beej Vikas Nigam'. He was re-elected in 2017 assembly election as an MLA again from Karachana. His victory was important for his party because he was the only candidate who won from Samajwadi Party in Allahabad and nearby constituencies. On 2 April 2024 he joined Indian National Congress in Uttar Pradesh Congress Committee Office. He was elected to 18th Lok Sabha from Allahabad with a margin of 58,795 votes.

== Posts held ==
#	From	To	Position
01	2024		Member, 18th Lok Sabha
02	2017	2022	Member, 17th Legislative Assembly
02	2012	2017	Chairman at Beej Vikas Nigam Uttar pradesh Cabinet minister
03	2005	2007	Environment minister
04	2004	2007	Member, 14th Legislative Assembly

== See also ==
- Uttar Pradesh Legislative Assembly
