= Saroj Dubey =

Indian politician (1938–2020)

Member of Parliament, Lok Sabha
- In office 1991–1996
- Preceded by: Janeshwar Mishra
- Succeeded by: Murli Manohar Joshi
- Constituency: Allahabad, Uttar Pradesh

Member of Parliament, Rajya Sabha
- In office 1998–2004
- Constituency: Bihar

Personal details
- Born: 5 September 1938 Faizabad, United Provinces, British India (now Ayodhya, Uttar Pradesh, India)
- Died: 21 June 2020 (aged 81) Noida, Uttar Pradesh, India
- Party: Rashtriya Janata Dal
- Other political affiliations: Janata Dal
- Spouse: Justice J.N. Dubey
- Children: 2
- Relatives: Aditya Dubey (grandson)

Saroj Dubey (née Trivedi; 5 September 1938 - 21 June 2020) was an Indian politician. She was elected to the Lok Sabha the lower house of Indian Parliament from Allahabad in Uttar Pradesh in 1991 as a member of the Janata Dal. However, later after the break-up of the Janata Dal, She joined the Rashtriya Janata Dal and was a member of the Rajya Sabha, the upper house of the Parliament of India representing Bihar. Her son Anurag Dubey and daughter-in-law Anu Dubey are Supreme Court lawyers. Her grandson Aditya Dubey is an environmental activist. Her granddaughter Anoushka Tiwari is studying Computer Engineering at Carnegie Mellon University, USA.
