= Hari Krishna Shastri =

Indian politician

Member of Parliament, Lok Sabha
- In office 1967–1971
- Preceded by: Lal Bahadur Shastri
- Succeeded by: Hemwati Nandan Bahuguna
- Constituency: Allahabad
- In office 1980–1989
- Preceded by: Liaquat Husain
- Succeeded by: Vishwanath Pratap Singh
- Constituency: Fatehpur

Personal details
- Born: 21 February 1938; Allahabad (Uttar Pradesh)
- Died: 17 June 1997 (aged 59); New Delhi
- Political party: Indian National Congress
- Spouse: Vibha Shastri
- Parent(s): Lal Bahadur Shastri; Lalita Shastri
- Relatives: Sunil Shastri; Anil Shastri
- Education: Mechanical Engineering

Hari Krishna Shastri (21 February 1938 – 17 June 1997) was an Indian politician who was a Minister in the Government of India. He was a member of Fourth (1967, from Allahabad), Seventh (1980, from Fatehpur) and Eighth Lok Sabha. He was the losing candidate from Fatehpur in 1989 general election.

== Personal life ==
He was the son of former Prime Minister Lal Bahadur Shastri.
