= Shakti Sthal =

Monument to Indira Gandhi in New Delhi, India

Coordinates: 28°38′39″N 77°14′56″E

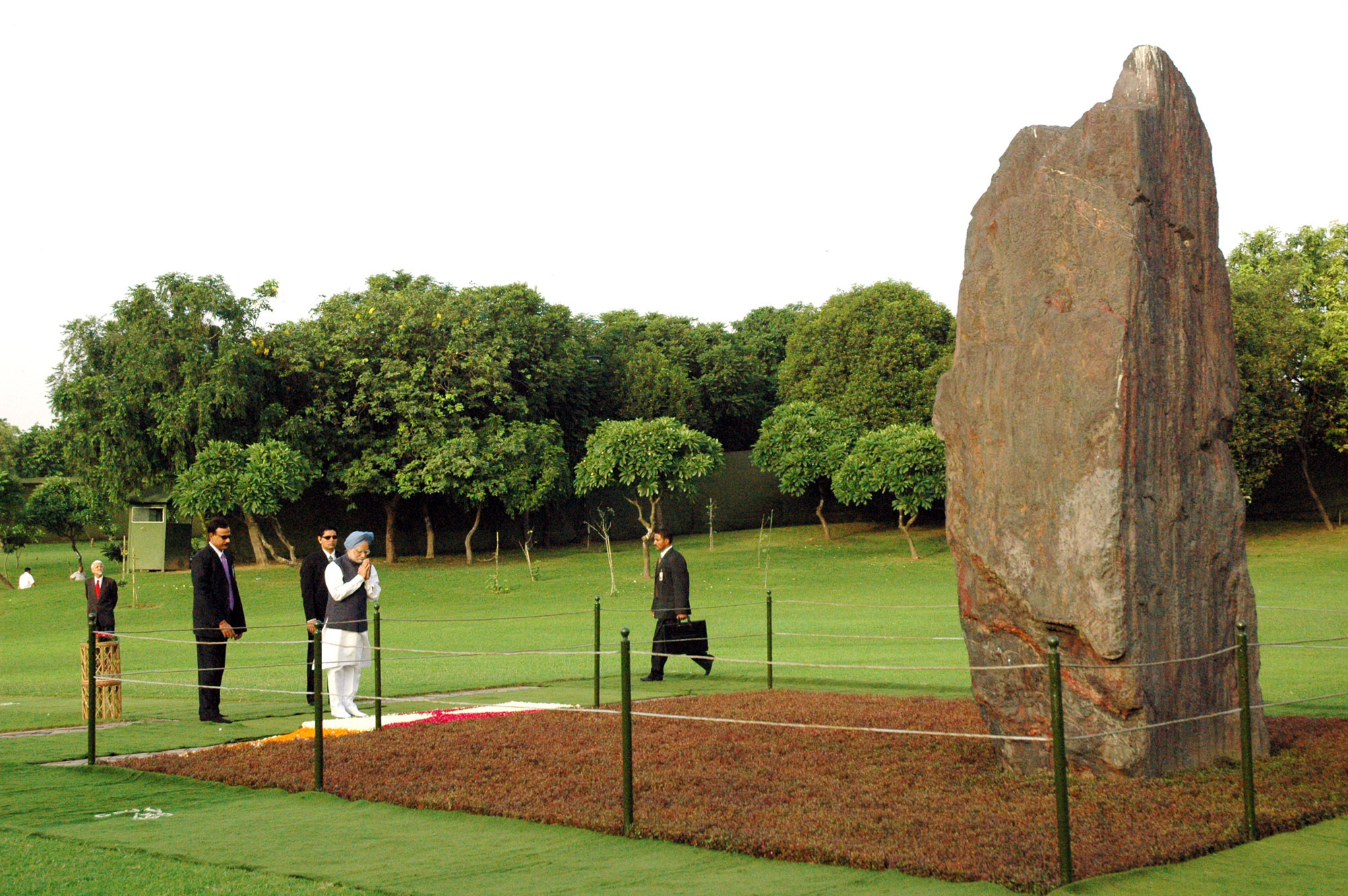
The former Prime Minister Manmohan Singh paying homage at Shakti Sthal on 15 August 2007

Shakti Sthal (transl. 'Place of strength') is a memorial in Raj Ghat, New Delhi, India, marking the cremation site of Indira Gandhi. Politicians of the Indian National Congress traditionally visit the monument to pay tributes.

== Description ==
The site is marked by a large monolithic rock of iron ore, symbolizing the title "iron lady of India". The rock was sourced from one of the mines in Sundergarh district, Odisha.

== See also ==
- Raj Ghat and associated memorials
