= Uprising 2011: Indians Against Corruption =

Uprising 2011, Indians Against Corruption
- Author: Pavan Choudary and Kiran Bedi
- Subjects: History/Politics
- Publisher: Wisdom Village Publications
- Publication place: India
- Media type: Print (paperback) (color)
- Pages: 130
- ISBN: 9789380710440

Uprising 2011- Indians Against Corruption, published in January 2013, is a pictorial diary/chronicle of the civil-society supported anti-corruption movement that took place in India between 2010 and 2012. The period compilation has been jointly brought together by Kiran Bedi and Pavan Choudary as a dedication to all the Indians who participated in anti-corruption uprising led by Anna Hazare.

== Summary ==
Uprising 2011 is a compilation of selected news clippings, cartoons, interesting quotes and published articles of the anti-corruption movement that took place in India between 2010 – 2012, also referred to as India's Arab Spring or its second war of independence (against corruption). The book gives a thumb-nail view of the historical awakening of the Indian society, to take the readers through the struggle chronologically as it was being reported.

== See also ==
- Corruption in India
