= Bara Assembly constituency =

Constituency of the Uttar Pradesh legislative assembly in India

Coordinates: 26.59°N 82.45°E

Bara
- Constituency No. 72 for the Uttar Pradesh Legislative Assembly

Constituency details
- Country: India
- Region: North India
- State: Uttar Pradesh
- District: Prayagraj
- Total electors: 325,412 (2019)
- Reservation: SC

Member of Legislative Assembly
- 18th Uttar Pradesh Legislative Assembly
- Incumbent Vachaspati
- Party: AD(S)
- Alliance: NDA
- Elected year: 2022

Bara is a constituency of the Uttar Pradesh Legislative Assembly covering the city of Bara in the Prayagraj district of Uttar Pradesh, India.

Bara is one of five assembly constituencies in the Prayagraj. Since 2008, this assembly constituency is numbered 264 amongst 403 constituencies.

== Members of the Legislative Assembly ==
Election	Name	Party
2002	Udaibhan Karwaria	Bharatiya Janata Party
2007	Udaibhan Karwaria	Bharatiya Janata Party
2012	Ajai Kumar	Samajwadi Party
2017	Ajai Kumar	Bharatiya Janata Party
2022	Vachaspati	Apna Dal (Soneylal)

== Election results ==
=== 2027 ===
2027 Uttar Pradesh Legislative Assembly election: Bara
Party	Candidate	Votes	%	±%
INDIA				
NDA				
BSP				
NOTA	None of the above			
Majority				
Turnout				
gain from		Swing		

=== 2022 ===
2022 Uttar Pradesh Legislative Assembly election: Bara
Party	Candidate	Votes	%	±%
AD(S)	Vachaspati	89,203	43.49	
SP	Ajay	76,679	37.38	+13.61
BSP	Dr. Ajay Kumar	22,719	11.08	−8.42
INC	Manju Sant	3,443	1.68	+0.6
Peoples Party of India (Democratic)	Ram Kumar Vidyarthi	2,575	1.26	
NOTA	None of the above	2,731	1.33	+0.09
Majority		12,524	6.11	−11.81
Turnout		205,129	61.25	+1.99
AD(S) gain from BJP		Swing		

=== 2017 ===
Bharatiya Janta Party candidate Dr. Ajai Kumar won in 2017 Uttar Pradesh Legislative Elections defeating Samajwadi Party candidate Ajay by a margin of 34,053 votes.

2017 Uttar Pradesh Legislative Assembly Election: Bar
Party	Candidate	Votes	%	±%
BJP	Dr. Ajai Kumar	79,209	41.69	
SP	Ajay (Bharti Munna Bhaiya)	45,156	23.77	
BSP	Ashok Kumar Gautam	37,052	19.5	
NISHAD	Phool Chandra	10,704	5.63	
Independent	Hansraj Kol	3,729	1.96	
CPI	Ayodhya Prasad Adivasi Kol	2,573	1.35	
INC	Suresh Kumar Verma	2,045	1.08	
NOTA	None of the above	2,327	1.24	
Majority		34,053	17.92	
Turnout		189,974	59.26	

=== 2012 ===
Samajwadi Party candidate Dr. Ajay Kumar defeated BJP candidate Vibhavnath Bharti.
