= Vachaspati (politician) =

Indian politician

Vachaspati Arya

Member of the Uttar Pradesh Legislative Assembly
- Incumbent
- Assumed office 2022
- Preceded by: Ajai Kumar
- Constituency: Bara

Personal details
- Born: 1957 (age 68–69) Sirathu, Prayagraj district, Uttar Pradesh
- Party: Apna Dal (Soneylal)
- Education: Master of Arts (Chhatrapati Shahu Ji Maharaj University)

Vachaspati (born 1957) is an Indian politician from Uttar Pradesh. He is a member of the Uttar Pradesh Legislative Assembly from the Bara Assembly constituency, which is a reserved constituency for Scheduled Caste community, in Prayagraj district. He won the 2022 Uttar Pradesh Legislative Assembly election representing the Apna Dal (Soneylal).

== Early life and education ==
Vachaspati is from Sirathu, Prayagraj district, Uttar Pradesh. He is the son of late Rajaram. He completed his MA in 2022 at Chhatrapati Shahu Ji Maharaj University, Kanpur.

== Career ==
Vachaspati won from Bara Assembly constituency, representing Apna Dal (Soneylal), in the 2022 Uttar Pradesh Legislative Assembly election. He polled 89,203 votes and defeated his nearest rival, Ajay Munna of the Samajwadi Party, by a margin of 12,464 votes.
