= Piyush Ranjan Nishad =

Member of the Uttar Pradesh Legislative Assembly

Member of Uttar Pradesh Legislative Assembly
- Incumbent
- Assumed office March 2022
- Preceded by: Ujjwal Raman Singh
- Constituency: Karachhana

Personal details
- Born: 9 September 1972 (age 53) Prayagraj, Uttar Pradesh
- Party: Bharatiya Janata Party
- Profession: Politician

Piyush Ranjan Nishad is an Indian politician and a member of the 18th Uttar Pradesh Assembly from the Karachhana Assembly constituency of Prayagraj district. He is a member of the Bharatiya Janata Party.

== Early life ==
Piyush Ranjan Nishad was born on 9 September 1972 in Prayagraj, Uttar Pradesh, to a Hindu family of Kamta Prasad Nishad. He married Shakuntala Nishad in 1995, and they had four children.

== See also ==
- 18th Uttar Pradesh Assembly
- Karachhana Assembly constituency
- Uttar Pradesh Legislative Assembly
