= Abhilasha Gupta =

Indian politician

Mayor of Prayagraj
- In office 7 July 2012 – 2023
- Preceded by: Ch.Jitendra Nath Singh
- Succeeded by: Ganesh Kesarwani

Personal details
- Party: Bharatiya Janata Party
- Spouse: Nand Gopal Gupta (m. 1995)
- Education: Graduate

Abhilasha Gupta Nandi is a politician from Prayagraj, Uttar Pradesh, India. She was mayor of the Prayagraj Municipal Corporation from 2012 to 2023.

She was elected mayor on 7 July 2012, becoming the youngest person to have been elected to the post. In the 2012 Mayoral election, she defeated her nearest rival Kamla Singh of the BJP by a comprehensive margin of more than 69,000 votes. She is married to Nand Gopal Nandi.

She was arrested on 14 February 2014 in a case related to the alleged violation of the model code of conduct in 2012 civic body polls. Abhilasha and her husband Nand Gopal Nandi who was affiliated with Bahujan Samaj Party, have been expelled from the party for their alleged anti-party activities in a case related to the alleged violation of the model code of conduct in 2012 civic body polls in March, 2014.

She joined the BJP in January, 2017, along with her husband Nand Gopal Nandi.

Gupta comfortably defended her post in the Mayoral elections of 2017, defeating her nearest rival, Samajwadi Party's Vinod Dubey, by more than 63,000 votes.
