= Lalita Shastri =

Wife of Lal Bahadur Shastri, former Prime Minister of India

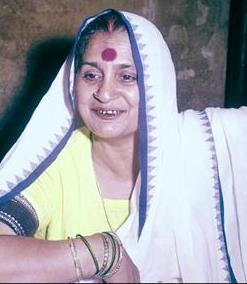

Spouse of the Prime Minister of India
- In office 9 June 1964 – 11 January 1966
- Prime Minister: Lal Bahadur Shastri
- Preceded by: Vacant
- Succeeded by: Vacant

Personal details
- Born: Lalmani Devi; 11 January 1910 Mirzapur, United Provinces of Agra and Oudh, British India (present-day Uttar Pradesh, India)
- Died: 13 April 1993 (aged 83) New Delhi, Delhi, India
- Spouse: Lal Bahadur Shastri (m. 1928; died 1966)
- Children: 6; including Anil, Hari Krishna and Sunil

Lalita Shastri (born Lalmani Devi; 11 January 1910 – 13 April 1993) was the wife of Prime Minister of India, Lal Bahadur Shastri.

Devi was from Mirzapur in Uttar Pradesh. She married Shastri on 16 May 1928. After marriage, the couple lived for several years in Prayagraj (then Allahabad) before moving to Lucknow and then to New Delhi. Shastri spent nine years of his life in jail. During these spells, Devi looked after the children and household. The family moved to New Delhi in 1952 when Shastri became the railway minister. However, they vacated the premises after his death. But in 1968, the then-Prime Minister Indira Gandhi allotted the house to Devi and she lived there until her death on 13 April 1993.

Today, Lal Bhadur Shastri Memorial run by Lal Bahadur Shastri National Memorial Trust, is situated next to 10 Janpath, the official residence of her husband as prime minister, at 1, Motilal Nehru Place, New Delhi.

She founded the Shastri Sewa Niketan. Her son Sunil Shastri is its present chairman. Devi died in 1993 in New Delhi. Anil Shastri, one of her sons, is a former Lok Sabha member.

An epic poetry book in Hindi titled Lalita Ke Aansoo written by Krant M. L. Verma was published in 1978. In this book the complete story of her husband Lal Bahadur Shastri has been narrated by Lalita Shastri. Lalita herself wrote verse on occasion, and a few songs written by her (such as "भोला भोला रटते रटते") were set to tune by Chitragupta and sung by Lata Mangeshkar.
