= Lal Bahadur Shastri =

Prime Minister of India from 1964 to 1966

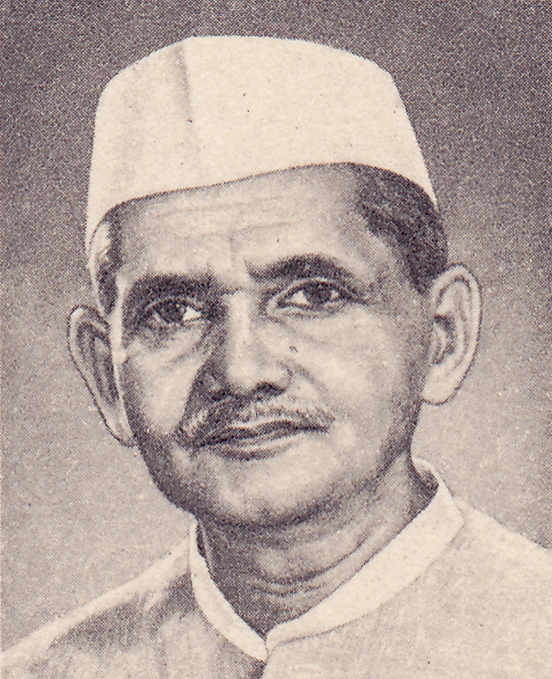
- Stamp photo of PM Lal Bahadur Shastri

Prime Minister of India
- In office 9 June 1964 – 11 January 1966
- President: Sarvepalli Radhakrishnan
- Vice President: Zakir Husain
- Preceded by: Jawaharlal Nehru; Gulzarilal Nanda (acting)
- Succeeded by: Gulzarilal Nanda (acting); Indira Gandhi

Union Minister of External Affairs
- In office 9 June 1964 – 18 July 1964
- Prime Minister: Himself
- Preceded by: Gulzarilal Nanda
- Succeeded by: Sardar Swaran Singh

Union Minister of Home Affairs
- In office 4 April 1961 – 29 August 1963
- Prime Minister: Jawaharlal Nehru
- Preceded by: Govind Ballabh Pant
- Succeeded by: Gulzarilal Nanda

Union Minister of Railways
- In office 13 May 1952 – 7 December 1956
- Prime Minister: Jawaharlal Nehru
- Preceded by: N. Gopalaswami Ayyangar
- Succeeded by: Jagjivan Ram

Personal details
- Born: Lal Bahadur Srivastava; 2 October 1904 Mughalsarai, United Provinces of Agra and Oudh, British India
- Died: 11 January 1966 (aged 61) Tashkent, Uzbek SSR, Soviet Union
- Cause of death: Heart attack
- Party: Indian National Congress
- Spouse: Lalita Shastri (m. 1928)
- Children: 6; including Anil Shastri, Hari Krishna Shastri and Sunil Shastri
- Education: Kashi Vidyapith, Varanasi
- Profession: Politician
- Nickname: Nanhe

Lal Bahadur Shastri (Note: pronounced [laːlᵊ bəˈɦaːd̪ʊɾ ˈʂaːst̪ᵊɾiː]) (2 October 1904 – 11 January 1966) was an Indian politician and statesman who served as the prime minister of India from 1964 to 1966. He previously served as home minister from 1961 to 1963.

Shastri was born to Sharad Prasad Srivastava and Ramdulari Devi in Mughalsarai on 2 October 1904. He studied in East Central Railway Inter college and the Harish Chandra High School, which he left to join the non-cooperation movement. He worked for the betterment of the Harijans at Muzaffarpur and dropped his caste-derived surname of "Srivastava". Influenced by Mahatma Gandhi, he joined the Indian Independence movement in the 1920s. He served as the president of Servants of the People Society, founded by Lala Lajpat Rai and held prominent positions in the Indian National Congress (INC). Following Indian independence in 1947, Shastri led several union ministries under prime minister Jawaharlal Nehru.

As prime minister, Shastri promoted the White revolution, a national campaign to increase the production and supply of milk, by supporting the Amul milk co-operative and creating the National Dairy Development Board. Underlining the need to boost India's food production, Shastri also promoted the Green Revolution in India in 1965. This led to an increase in food grain production, especially in the states of Punjab, Haryana and Uttar Pradesh. He led the country during the India–Pakistan war of 1965. His slogan "Jai Jawan, Jai Kisan" ("Hail to the soldier; Hail to the farmer") became very popular during the war. The war formally ended with the Tashkent Declaration on 10 January 1966; Shastri died the next day.

== Early years (1904–1920) ==
Shastri was born on 2 October 1904 at the home of his maternal grandparents. Shastri's paternal ancestors were in the service of the zamindar of Ramnagar in Banaras, and Shastri lived there for the first year of his life. Shastri's father, Sharad Prasad Srivastava, was a school teacher who later became a clerk in the revenue office at Prayagraj, while his mother, Ramdulari Devi, was the daughter of Munshi Hazari Lal, the headmaster and English teacher at a railway school in Mughalsarai. Shastri was the second child and eldest son of his parents; he had an elder sister, Kailashi Devi (b. 1900).

In April 1905, when Shastri was hardly 18 months old, his father, who had recently been promoted to the post of deputy tehsildar, died in an epidemic of bubonic plague. Ramdulari Devi, then only 23 years old and pregnant with her third child, took her two children and moved from Ramnagar to her father's house in Mughalsarai and settled there for good. She gave birth to a daughter, Sundari Devi, in July 1906. Thus, Shastri and his sisters grew up in the household of his maternal grandfather, Hazari Lalji. However, Hazari Lalji himself died from a stroke in mid-1908. Thereafter, the family was looked after by his brother (Shastri's great-uncle) Darbari Lal, who was the head clerk in the opium regulation department at Ghazipur, and later by his son (Ramdulari Devi's cousin) Bindeshwari Prasad, a school teacher in Mughalsarai.

This situation was standard for the time, where the Indian joint family system was a thriving reality; the sense of family relationship and responsibility it fostered was the primary social security of the time. Nor should it be surmised from these circumstances that Shastri grew up in an under-privileged manner, or that his education and comforts were compromised. On the contrary, since he was a rank student, he received a better education than some of his cousins. Bindeshwari Prasad, on the limited salary of a school teacher, with many dependents, nevertheless managed to give a good education to all the children in his care.

In 1917, Bindeshwari Prasad was transferred to Varanasi, and the entire family moved there, including Ramdulari Devi and her three children. In Varanasi, Shastri joining the seventh standard at Harish Chandra High School.

== Early activities (1921–1945) ==
While his family had no links to the independence movement then taking shape, among his teachers at Harish Chandra High School was an intensely patriotic and highly respected teacher named Nishkameshwar Prasad Mishra, who gave Shastri much-needed financial support by allowing him to tutor his children. Inspired by Mishra's patriotism, Shastri took a deep interest in the freedom struggle, and began to study its history and the works of several of its noted personalities, including those of Swami Vivekananda, Mahatma Gandhi and Annie Besant. In January 1921, when Shastri was in the 10th standard and three months from sitting the final examinations, he attended a public meeting in Benares hosted by Gandhi and Pandit Madan Mohan Malaviya. Inspired by the Mahatma's call for students to withdraw from government schools and join the non-cooperation movement, Shastri withdrew from Harish Chandra High School the next day and joined the local branch of the Congress Party as a volunteer, actively participating in picketing and anti-government demonstrations. He was soon arrested and jailed, but was then let off as he was still a minor.

Shastri's immediate supervisor was a former Benares Hindu University lecturer named J.B. Kripalani, who would become one of the most prominent leaders of the Indian independence movement and one among Gandhi's closest followers. Recognising the need for the younger volunteers to continue their educations, Kripalani and a friend, V.N. Sharma, had founded an informal school centered around "nationalist education" to educate the young activists in their nation's heritage and with the support of a wealthy philanthropist and ardent Congress nationalist, Shiv Prasad Gupta, the Kashi Vidyapith was inaugurated by Gandhi in Benares as a national institution of higher education on 10 February 1921. Among the first students of the new institution, Shastri graduated with a first-class degree in philosophy and ethics from the Vidyapith in 1925. He was given the title Shastri ("scholar"). The title was a bachelor's degree awarded by the institution but it stuck as part of his name.

Shastri enrolled himself as a life member of the Servants of the People Society (Lok Sevak Mandal), founded by Lala Lajpat Rai, and began to work for the betterment of the Harijans under Gandhi's direction at Muzaffarpur. Later he became the president of the society.

=== Independence Activism of Lal Bahadur Shastri ===
In 1928 Shastri became an active and mature member of the Indian National Congress at the call of Mahatma Gandhi. He was imprisoned for two and a half years. Later, he worked as the Organizing Secretary of the Parliamentary Board of U.P. in 1937. In 1940, he was sent to prison for one year, for offering individual Satyagraha support to the independence movement.

On 8 August 1942, Mahatma Gandhi issued the Quit India speech at Gowalia Tank in Bombay, demanding that the British leave India. Shastri, who had just then come out after a year in prison, travelled to Allahabad. For a week, he sent instructions to the independence activists from Jawaharlal Nehru's home, Anand Bhavan. He served as an elected representative for United Provinces in 1937 and 1946. During the freedom struggle, Shastri spent a total of nearly nine years in British prisons.

== Political career (1947–1964) ==
=== State minister ===
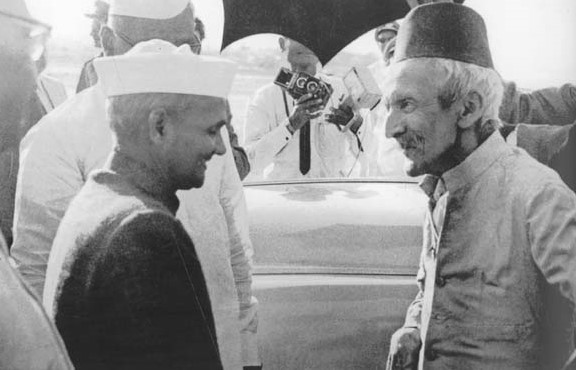
Shastri with the 7th Nizam of Hyderabad State

Following India's independence, Shastri was appointed Parliamentary Secretary in his home state, Uttar Pradesh. He became the Minister of Police and Transport under Govind Ballabh Pant's Chief Ministership on 15 August 1947 following Rafi Ahmed Kidwai's departure to become a minister at the centre. As the Transport Minister, he was the first to appoint women conductors. As the minister in charge of the Police Department, he ordered that police use water jets, whose instructions was given by him, instead of lathis to disperse unruly crowds. His tenure as police minister (As Home Minister was called prior to 1950) saw successful curbing of communal riots in 1947, mass migration and resettlement of refugees.

=== Cabinet minister ===
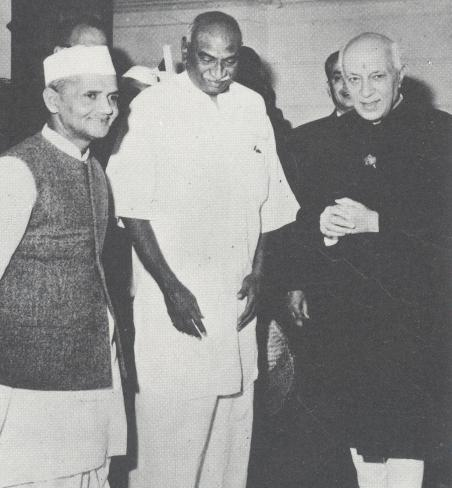
Jawaharlal Nehru with Lal Bahadur Shastri and K. Kamaraj

In 1951, Shastri was made the General Secretary of the All-India Congress Committee with Jawaharlal Nehru as the prime minister. He was directly responsible for the selection of candidates and the direction of publicity and electioneering activities. He played an important role in the landslide successes of the Congress Party in the Indian General Elections of 1952, 1957 and 1962. In 1952, he successfully contested UP Vidhansabha from Soraon North cum Phulpur West seat and won by getting over 69% of vote. He was believed to be retained as home minister of UP, but in a surprise move was called to Centre as minister by Nehru. Shastri was made Minister of Railways and Transport in First Cabinet of Republic of India on 13 May 1952.

In September 1956, taking political and moral responsibility for the 1956 Mahbubnagar train accident, he offered his resignation as the Minister of Railways to Prime Minister Jawaharlal Nehru, who refused. After the 1956 Ariyalur train accident, a similar accident about 2.5 months later, Shastri again offered his resignation, which was accepted. He left the office of Railway Minister on 7 December 1956.

He served as the Minister of Commerce and Industry in 1959 and Minister of Home Affairs in 1961. Shastri laid the foundation of Mangalore Port in 1964 as a minister without a portfolio.

== Prime Minister (1964–1966) ==
Jawaharlal Nehru died in office on 27 May 1964. Then Congress Party president K. Kamaraj was instrumental in making Shastri prime minister on 9 June. Shastri, though mild-mannered and soft-spoken, was a Nehruvian socialist and thus held appeal to those wishing to prevent the ascent of conservative right-winger Morarji Desai.

In his first broadcast as prime minister, on 11 June 1964, Shastri stated:

There comes a time in the life of every nation when it stands at the cross-roads of history and must choose which way to go. But for us, there need be no difficulty or hesitation, no looking to right or left. Our way is straight and clear—the building up of a socialist democracy at home with freedom and prosperity for all, and the maintenance of world peace and friendship with all nations.

=== Domestic policies ===
Shastri retained many members of Nehru's Council of Ministers. T. T. Krishnamachari was retained as the Finance Minister of India, as was Defence Minister Yashwantrao Chavan. Further, He appointed Swaran Singh to succeed him as External Affairs Minister. He also appointed Indira Gandhi, daughter of Jawaharlal Nehru and former Congress President, as the Minister of Information and Broadcasting. Gulzarilal Nanda continued as the Minister of Home Affairs.

Lal Bahadur Shastri's tenure witnessed the Madras anti-Hindi agitation of 1965. The government of India had for a long time made an effort to establish Hindi as the sole national language of India. This was resisted by the non–Hindi-speaking states, particularly Madras State. To calm the situation, Shastri gave assurances that English would continue to be used as the official language as long the non–Hindi-speaking states wanted. The riots subsided after Shastri's assurance, as did the student agitation.

=== Economic policies ===
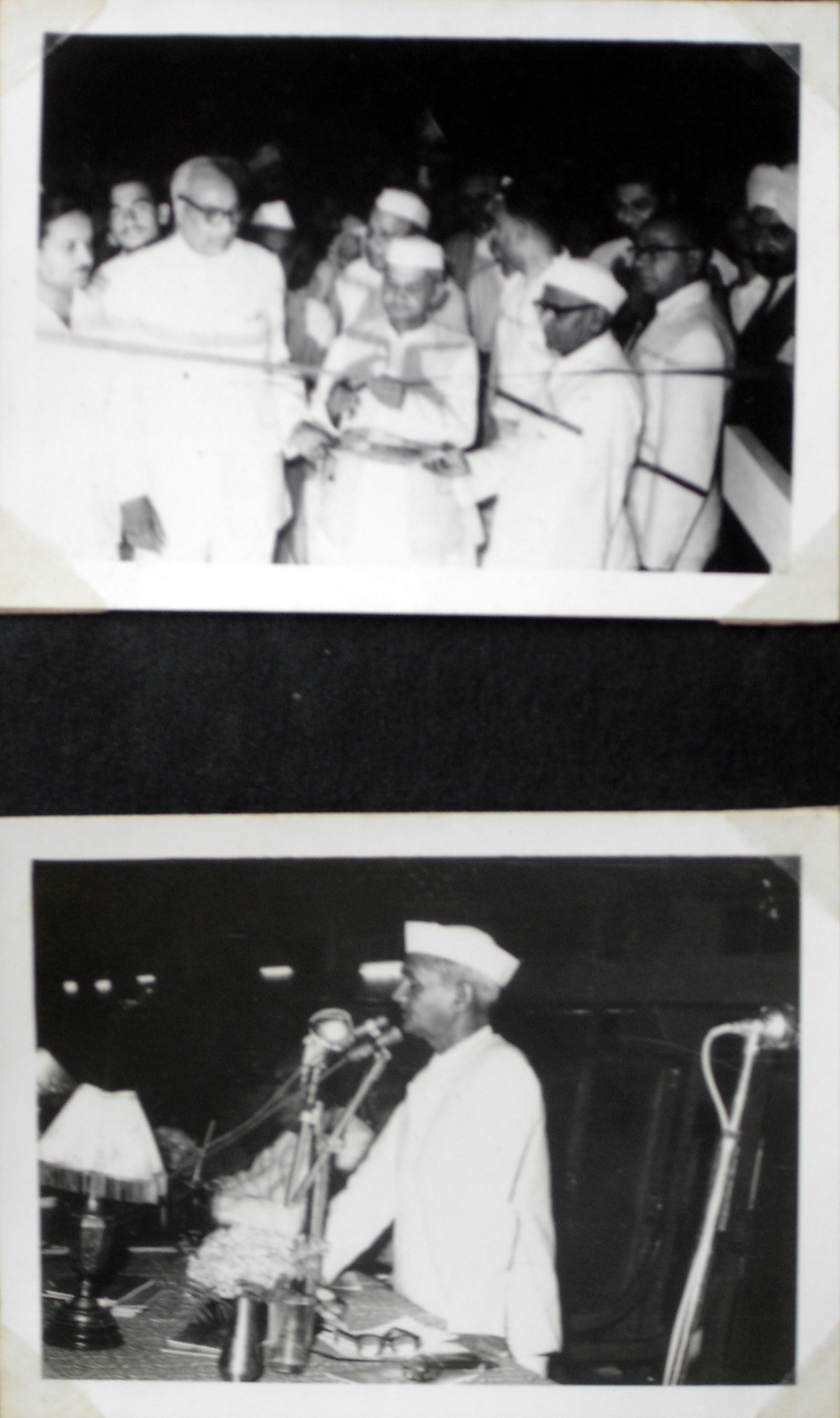
Inauguration of the Main Building of MNREC Allahabad by Lal Bahadur Shashtri on 18 April 1965

Shastri continued Nehru's socialist economic policies with central planning. He promoted the White revolution – a national campaign to increase the production and supply of milk – by supporting the Amul milk co-operative of Anand, Gujarat and creating the National Dairy Development Board. He visited Anand on 31 October 1964 for inauguration of the Cattle Feed Factory of Amul at Kanjari. As he was keenly interested in knowing the success of this co-operative, he stayed overnight with farmers in a village, and even had dinner with a farmer's family. He discussed his wish with Verghese Kurien, then the general manager of Kaira District Co-operative Milk Producers' Union Ltd (Amul) to replicate this model to other parts of the country for improving the socio-economic conditions of farmers. As a result of this visit, the National Dairy Development Board (NDDB) was established at Anand in 1965.

While speaking on the chronic food shortages across the country, Shastri urged people to voluntarily give up one meal so that the food saved could be distributed to the affected populace. However, he ensured that he first implemented the system in his own family before appealing to the country. He went on air to appeal to his countrymen to skip a meal a week. The response to his appeal was overwhelming. Even restaurants and eateries downed the shutters on Monday evenings. Many parts of the country observed the "Shastri Vrat". He motivated the country to maximize the cultivation of food grains by ploughing the lawn himself, at his official residence in New Delhi. During the 22-day war with Pakistan in 1965, On 19 October 1965, Shastri gave the seminal 'Jai Jawan Jai Kishan' ("Hail the soldier, Hail the farmer") slogan at Urwa in Allahabad that became a national slogan. Underlining the need to boost India's food production, Shastri also promoted the Green Revolution in India in 1965. This led to an increase in food grain production, especially in Punjab, Haryana, and Uttar Pradesh. Major milestones in this undertaking were the development of high-yielding varieties of wheat, and rust resistant strains of wheat.

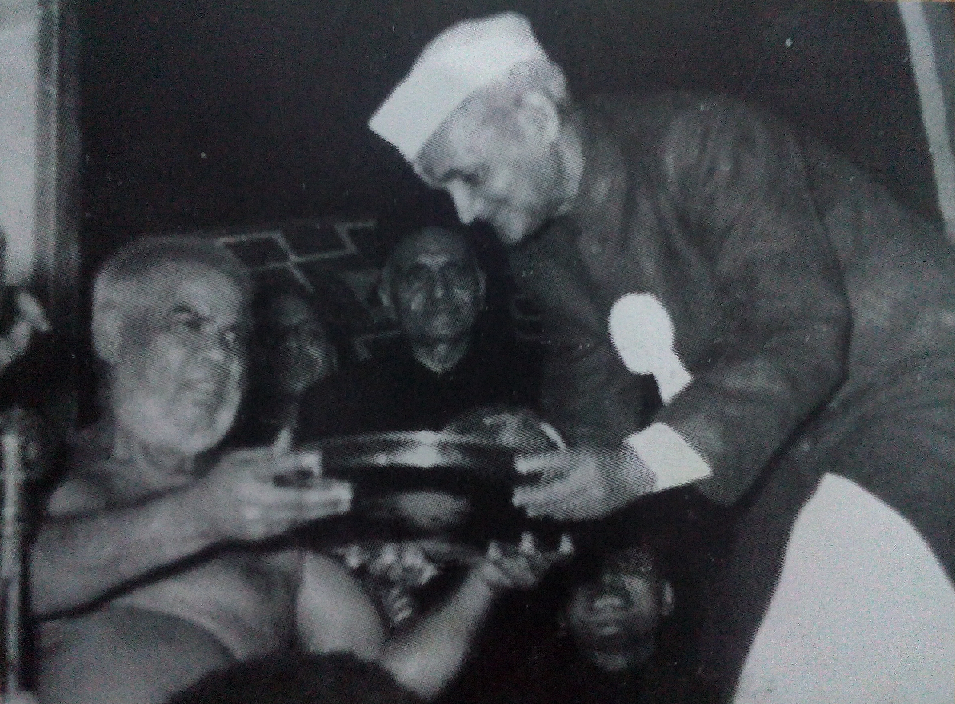
Lal Bahadur Shastri in 1964

Though he was a socialist, Shastri stated that India cannot have a regimented type of economy. His government passed the National Agricultural Products Board Act and was responsible for setting up the Food Corporation of India under the Food Corporation's Act 1964.

=== Jai Jawan Jai Kisan ===
For the outstanding slogan given by him during the Indo-Pak war of 1965, the Ministry of Information and Broadcasting (India) commemorated Shastri 47 years after his death on his 48th martyr's day:

Former Prime Minister Lal Bahadur Shastri was one of those great Indians who has left an indelible impression on our collective life. Lal Bahadur Shastri's contribution to our public life were unique in that they were made in the closest proximity to the life of the common man in India. Lal Bahadur Shastri was looked upon by Indians as one of their own, one who shared their ideals, hopes and aspirations. His achievements were looked upon not as the isolated achievements of an individual but of our society collectively. Under Shastri's leadership India faced and repulsed the Pakistani invasion of 1965. It is not only a matter of pride for the Indian Army but also for every citizen of the country. His slogan Jai Jawan! Jai Kisan!! reverberates even today through the length and breadth of the country. Underlying this is the inner-most sentiments 'Jai Hind'. The war of 1965 was fought and won for our self-respect and our national prestige. For using our Defence Forces with such admirable skill, the nation remains beholden to Shri Lal Bahadur Shastri. He will be remembered for all times to come for his large heartedness and public service.

=== Foreign policy ===
Shastri continued Nehru's policy of non-alignment but also built closer relations with the Soviet Union. In the aftermath of the Sino-Indian War of 1962 and the formation of military ties between China and Pakistan, Shastri's government decided to expand the country's defence budget. In 1964, Shastri signed an accorresponsibilities of local governments to provide adequate facilities to shelter the repatriates upon disembarkation on Indian soil. Particularly in the Madras State the chief minister during that time, Minjur K. Bhaktavatsalam, showed care in rehabilitation of the returnees. In December 1965, Shastri made an official visit with his family to Rangoon, Burma and re-established cordial relations with the country's military government of General Ne Win.

=== War with Pakistan ===
Laying claim to half the Kutch peninsula, the Pakistani army skirmished with Indian forces in August 1965. In his report to the Lok Sabha on the confrontation in Kutch, Shastri stated:

In the utilization of our limited resources, we have always given primacy to plans and projects for economic development. It would, therefore, be obvious for anyone who is prepared to look at things objectively that India can have no possible interest in provoking border incidents or in building up an atmosphere of strife... In these circumstances, the duty of Government is quite clear and this duty will be discharged fully and effectively... We would prefer to live in poverty for as long as necessary but we shall not allow our freedom to be subverted.

On 1 August 1965, major incursions of militants and Pakistani soldiers began, hoping not only to break down the government but incite a sympathetic revolt. The revolt did not happen, and India sent its forces across the Ceasefire Line (now Line of Control) and threatened Pakistan by crossing the International Border near Lahore as war broke out on a general scale. Massive tank battles occurred in the Punjab, and while the Pakistani forces made gains in the northern part of subcontinent, Indian forces captured the key post at Haji Pir, in Kashmir, and brought the Pakistani city of Lahore under artillery and mortar fire.

The India-Pakistan war ended on 23 September 1965 with a United Nations-mandated ceasefire. In a broadcast to the nation on the day of the ceasefire, Shastri stated:

While the conflict between the armed forces of the two countries has come to an end, the more important thing for the United Nations and all those who stand for peace is to bring to an end the deeper conflict.... How can this be brought about? In our view, the only answer lies in peaceful coexistence. India has stood for the principle of coexistence and championed it all over the world. Peaceful coexistence is possible among nations no matter how deep the differences between them, how far apart they are in their political and economic systems, no matter how intense the issues that divide them.

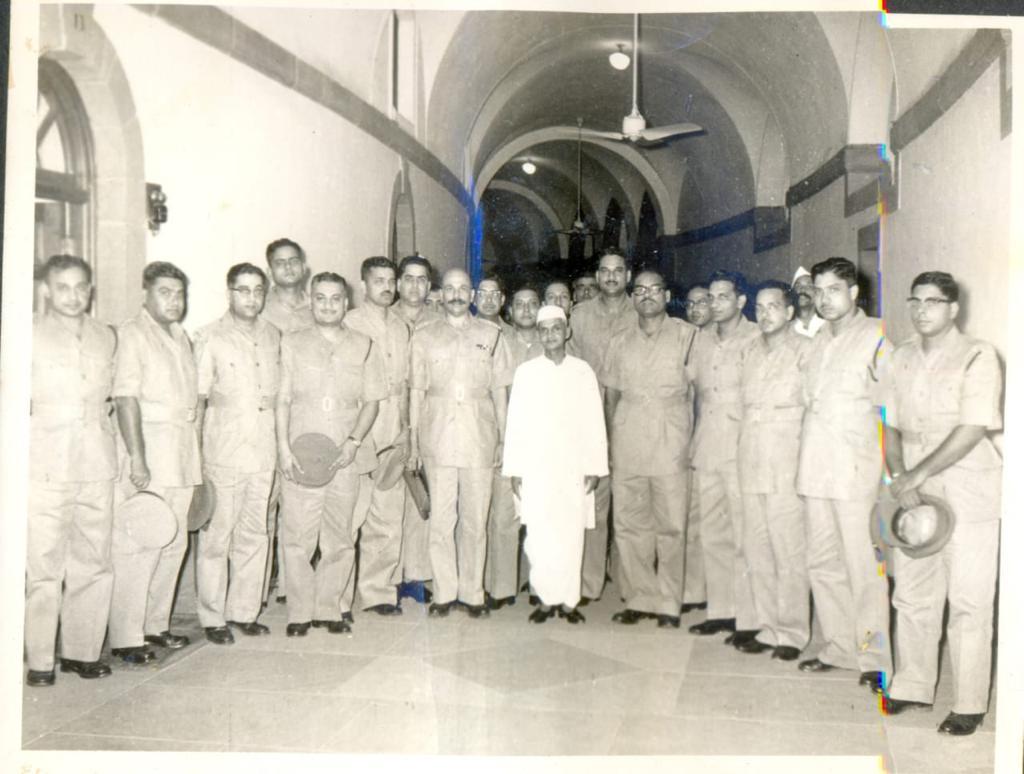
Lal Bahadur Shastri with police officers

During his tenure as prime minister, Shastri visited many countries including the Soviet Union, Yugoslavia, England, Canada, Nepal, Egypt and Burma. In October 1964 while returning from the Non Alliance Conference in Cairo, on the invitation of the-then president of Pakistan, Muhammad Ayub Khan, to have lunch with him, Shastri made a stopover at Karachi Airport for a few hours. Breaking with protocol, Ayub Khan personally received him at the airport and they had an informal meeting.

After the ceasefire with Pakistan in 1965, Shastri and Ayub Khan attended a summit in Tashkent (former USSR, now in modern Uzbekistan), organized by Alexei Kosygin. On 10 January 1966, Shastri and Ayub Khan signed the Tashkent Declaration which formally ended the war.

== Family and personal life ==
Shastri was 5 feet 2 inches (157.5 cm) tall and always wore a dhoti. The only occasion on which he wore pyjamas was a dinner in honor of the Queen of the United Kingdom in 1961 in the Rashtrapati Bhavan. On 16 May 1928, Shastri married Lalita Devi who was from Mirzapur. The couple had four sons and two daughters. Hari Krishna Shastri is the eldest son; The eldest daughter is Kusum Shastri. Suman Shastri is the next eldest, whose son, Siddharth Nath Singh is a spokesman of the Bharatiya Janata Party and Minister of Health, Government of Uttar Pradesh. Anil Shastri is the youngest and is a member of his father's Congress Party; his son Adarsh Shastri gave up his corporate career with Apple Inc to contest the General elections of 2014 from Prayagraj on an Aam Aadmi Party ticket. He lost that election but was elected in 2015 as a member of the Delhi Legislative Assembly. Sunil Shastri who is a member of the Indian National Congress and Ashok Shastri, the youngest son who worked in the corporate world before his death at the age of 37, his wife Neera Shastri was a member of the Bharatiya Janata Party national executive. Other members of the family, have also been involved in the corporate and social life of India.

Shastri was a vegetarian, non-smoker and teetotaller who preferred one meal a day. He was known to work eighteen hour days.

== Death ==
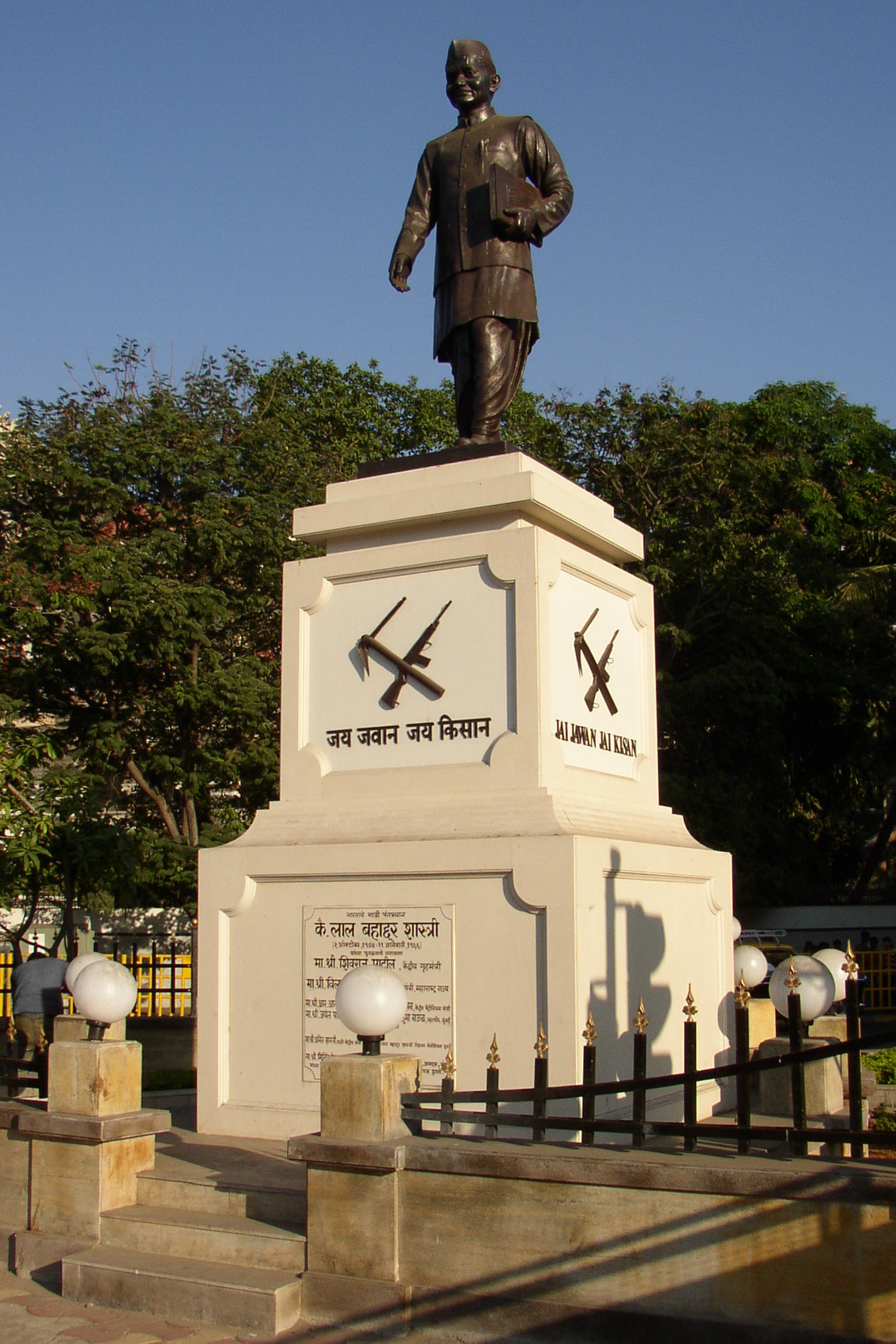
Shastri's statue in Mumbai

Shastri is suspected to have died due to a massive heart attack in Tashkent, Uzbekistan (then in the Soviet Union) on 11 January 1966, one day after signing a peace treaty to end the India–Pakistan war of 1965. Many of Shastri's supporters and close relatives refused at the time, and have refused since, to believe the circumstances of his death, instead alleging foul play. Conspiracy theories appeared within hours of his death, and have thereafter persisted. A movie named The Tashkent Files was made on the topic of his death. An RTI was filed to the Prime Minister's Office, office responded that it has one file on his death but cannot declassify it to the public. Many people still believe that he was poisoned. He is a national hero; the Vijay Ghat memorial was established in his memory. Upon his death, Gulzarilal Nanda once again assumed the role of acting prime minister, until the Congress Party elected Indira Gandhi over Morarji Desai to officially succeed Shastri.

== Awards and honours ==
=== National honours ===
- India:
  - Bharat Ratna (1966, posthumous)

=== Freedom of the City ===
- Belgrade, Yugoslavia:
  - Honorary Citizenship of Belgrade (1965)

== Legacy ==
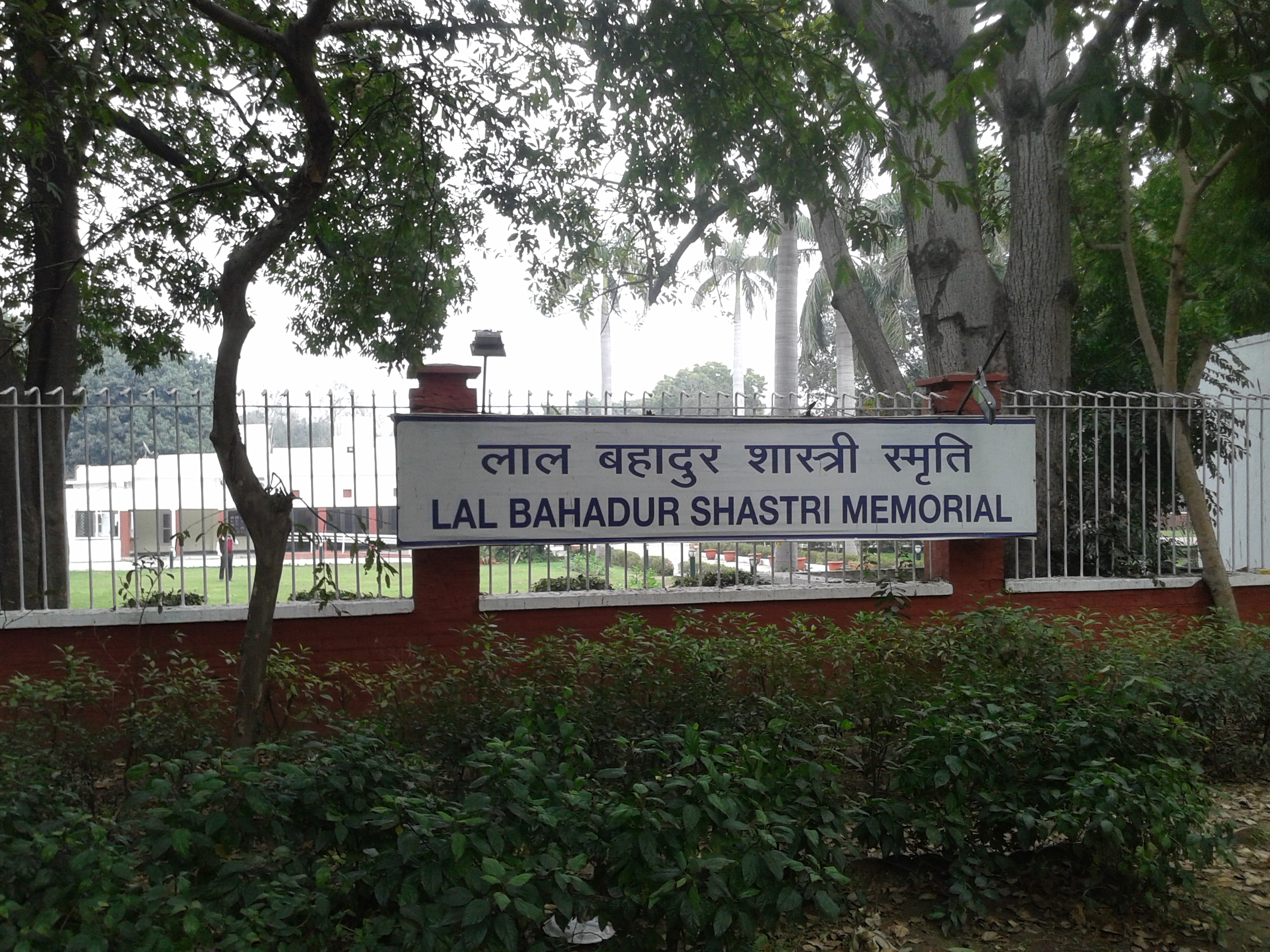
Lal Bahadur Shastri Memorial, New Delhi

Shastri is regarded as one of the most respected prime ministers of India. He was a secularist who refused to mix religion with politics. In a public meeting held at the Ram Lila grounds in Delhi, a few days after the ceasefire, he complained about a BBC report which claimed that Shastri's identity as a Hindu meant that he was ready for a war with Pakistan. He stated:

"While I am a Hindu, Mir Mushtaq who is presiding over this meeting is a Muslim. Mr. Frank Anthony who has addressed you is a Christian. There are also Sikhs and Parsis here. The unique thing about our country is that we have Hindus, Muslims, Christians, Sikhs, Parsis, and people of all other religions. We have temples and mosques, gurdwaras and churches. But we do not bring all this into politics. This is the difference between India and Pakistan. Whereas Pakistan proclaims herself to be an Islamic State and uses religion as a political factor, we Indians have the freedom to follow whatever religion we may choose, and worship in any way we please. So far as politics is concerned, each of us is as much an Indian as the other."

Kuldip Nayar, Shastri's media advisor from 1960 to 1964, recalls that, during the Quit India Movement, his daughter was ill and he was released on parole from jail. However, he could not save her life because doctors had prescribed costly drugs. Later on in 1963, on the day when he was dropped from the cabinet, he was sitting in his home in the dark, without a light. When asked about the reason, he said as he no longer is a minister, all expenses will have to be paid by himself and that as an MP and minister he didn't earn enough to save for times of need.

Although Shastri had been a cabinet minister for many years in the 1950s, he was poor when he died. All he owned at the end was an old car, which he had bought in installments from the government and for which he still owed money. He was a member of the Servants of India society (which included Mahatma Gandhi, Lala Lajpat Rai, Gopal Krishna Gokhle) which asked all its members to shun accumulation of private property and remain in public life as servants of the people. He was the first railway minister who resigned from office following a major train accident as he felt moral responsibility.

The foundation stone of Bal Vidya Mandir, a distinguished school of Lucknow, was laid by him during his tenure as the prime minister, on 19 November 1964. He inaugurated the Central Institute of Technology Campus at Tharamani, Chennai, in November 1964. He inaugurated the Plutonium Reprocessing Plant at Trombay in 1965. As suggested by Dr. Homi Jehangir Bhabha, Shastri authorized the development of nuclear explosives. Bhabha initiated the effort by setting up the nuclear explosive design group Study of Nuclear Explosions for Peaceful Purposes (SNEPP). He inaugurated the Andhra Pradesh Agricultural University at Hyderabad on 20 March 1965 which was renamed the Acharya N. G. Ranga Agricultural University in 1996 and was separated into two universities after the formation of Telangana State. The university in Telangana was named in July 2014 as Professor Jayashanker Agricultural University. Shastri also inaugurated the National Institute of Technology, Allahabad. Lal Bahadur Shastri inaugurated the Jawahar Dock of the Chennai Port Trust and started the construction work of V.O. Chidambaranar Port Authority in November 1964. He inaugurated the Sainik School Balachadi, in the state of Gujarat. He laid the foundation stone of Almatti dam. The commissioned dam bears his name.

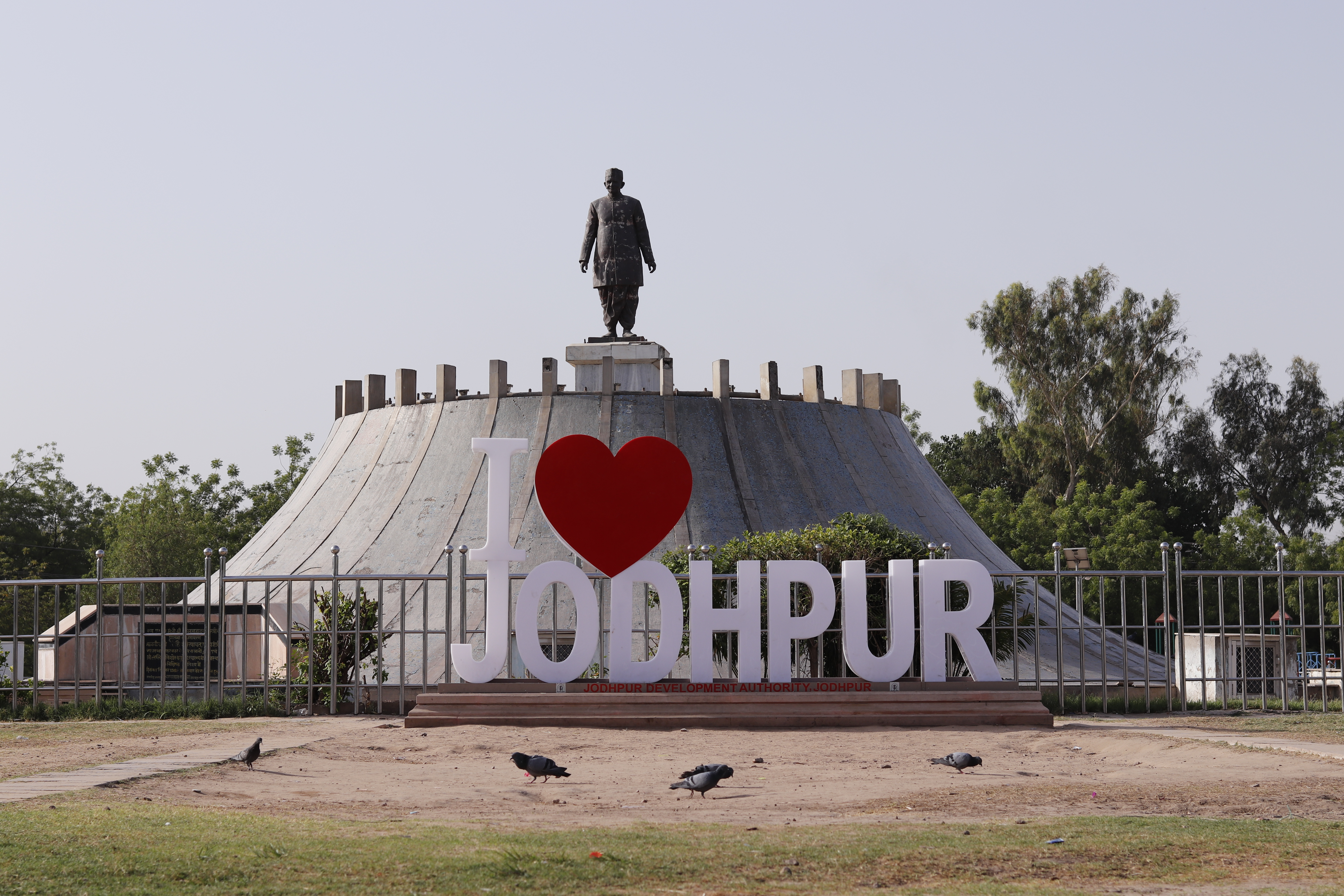
Shastri Circle Jodhpur

=== Memorials ===
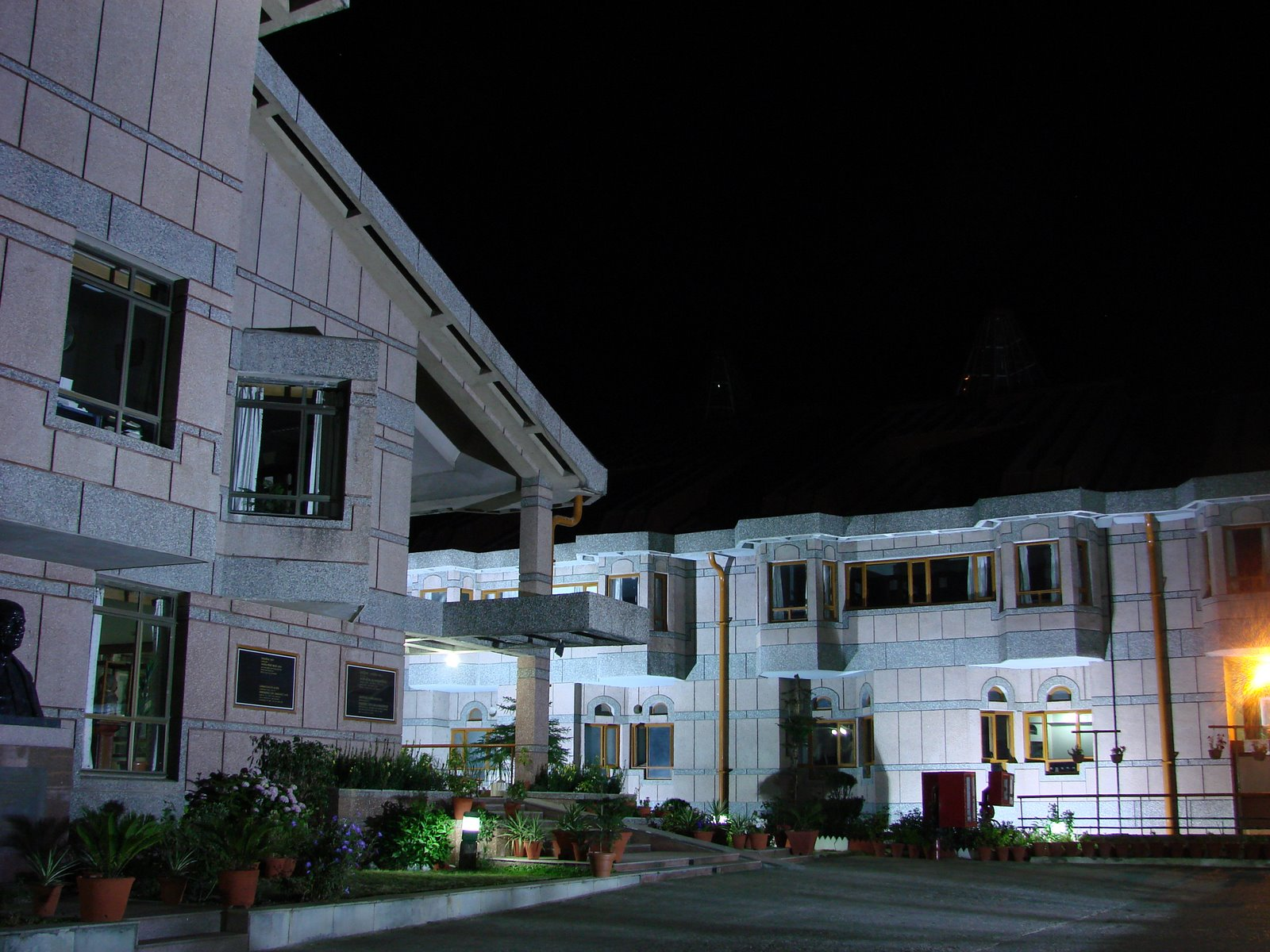
Lal Bahadur Shastri National Academy of Administration, Mussoorie

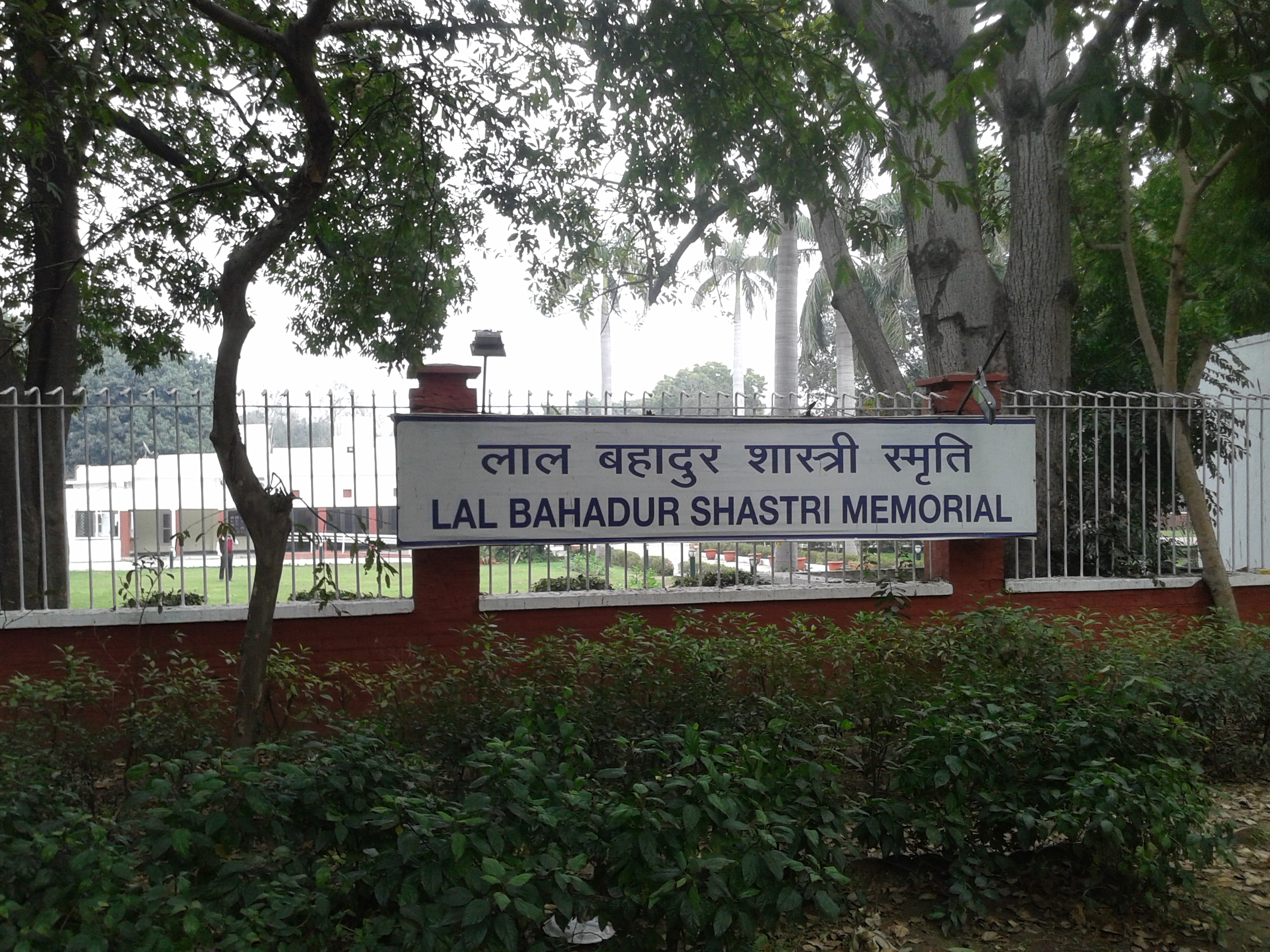
Lal Bahadur Shastri Memorial, New Delhi

Shastri was known for his honesty and humility throughout his life. He was posthumously awarded the Bharat Ratna, and a memorial "Vijay Ghat" was built for him in Delhi. Several educational institutes including Lal Bahadur Shastri National Academy of Administration (Mussorie, Uttarakhand) bear his name. The Lal Bahadur Shastri Institute of Management was established in Delhi by the Lal Bahadur Shastri Educational Trust in 1995. The Shastri Indo-Canadian Institute was named after Shastri due to his role in promoting scholarly activity between India and Canada. Lal Bahadur Shastri Memorial run by the Lal Bahadur Shastri National Memorial Trust, is situated next to 10 Janpath his residence when he was prime minister, at 1, Motilal Nehru Place, New Delhi. One of the halls of residence of IIT Kharagpur is named after him as Lal Bahadur Shastri Hall of Residence.

In 2011, on Shastri's 45th death anniversary, the Uttar Pradesh Government announced the renovation of Shastri's ancestral house at Ramnagar in Varanasi and declared plans to convert it into a biographical museum. Varanasi International Airport is named after him. The Lal Bahadur Shastri Centre for Indian Culture with a monument and a street named after him are in the city of Tashkent, Uzbekistan. A few stadiums are named after him in the cities of Hyderabad, Telangana, Ahmedabad in Gujarat, Kollam in Kerala, Ghazhiabad and Bhawanipatna in Odisha. The Almatti Dam across the River Krishna in northern Karnataka was renamed the Lal Bahadur Shastri Sagar. The foundation stone was laid by him. MV Lal Bahadur Shastri, a cargo ship, is named after him. The Reserve Bank of India released coins in the denomination of 5 rupees during his birth century celebrations. An All India Lal Bahadur Shastri Hockey tournament has been held every year since 1991 – it is a major hockey tournament. The Left Bank Canal of the Nagarjuna Sagar Dam in Andhra Pradesh is named the Lal Bahadur Shastri Canal and is 295 km in Length.

Some major roads in the cities of New Delhi, Mumbai, Pune, Puduchery, Lucknow, Warangal and Allahabad and Ernakulam are named after him, as is Sashtri Road, Kottayam, Kerala. There is a Lal Bahadur Shastri Medical College in Mandi, Himachal Pradesh and Shastri Bhavans in New Delhi, Chennai and Lucknow. In 2005, the Government of India created a chair in his honour in the field of democracy and governance at Delhi University.

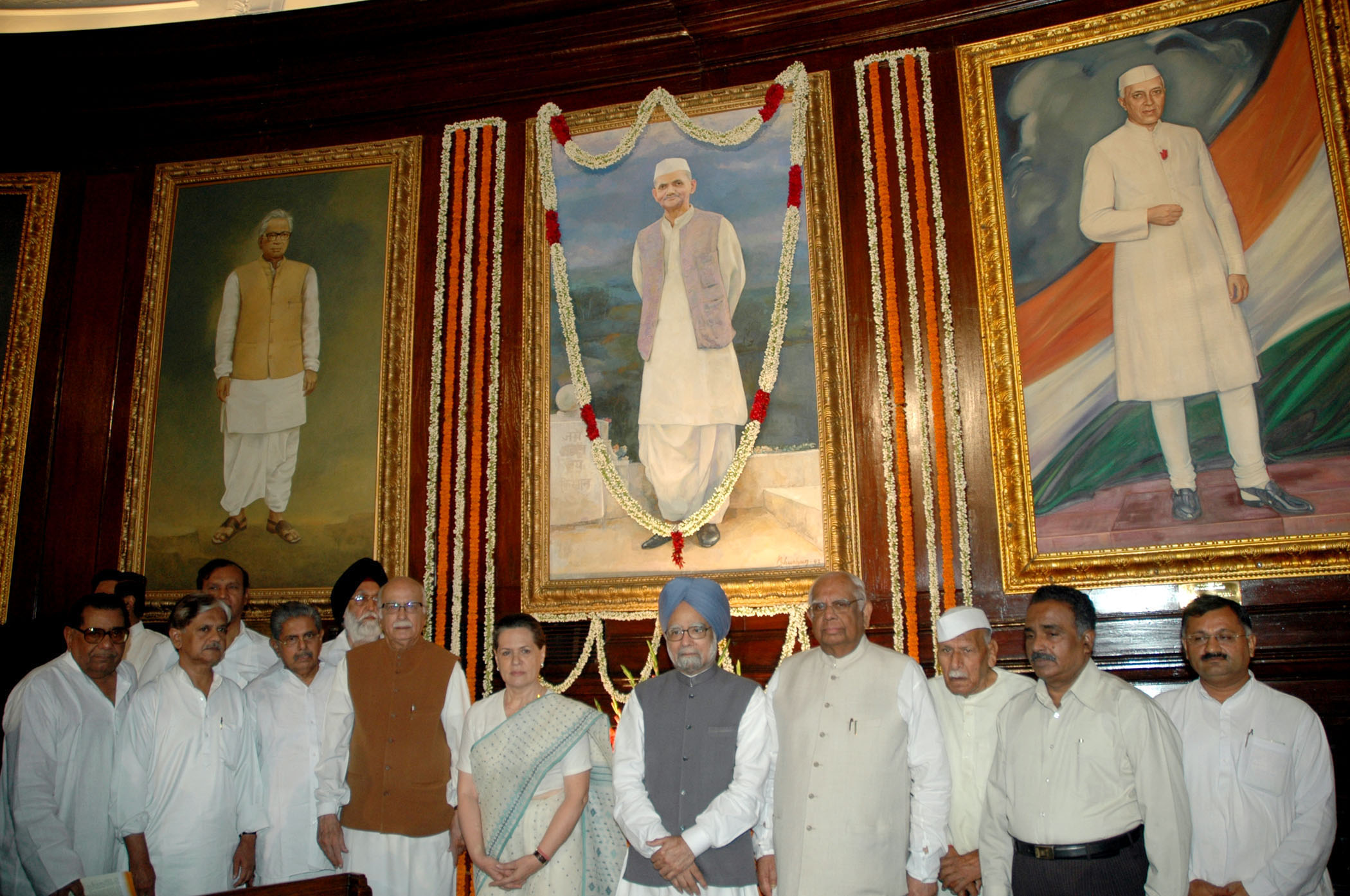
Manmohan Singh, the Speaker, Lok Sabha, Shri Somnath Chatterjee along with other dignitaries paid homage to the former Prime Minister Shri Lal Bahadur Shastri on his 104th birth anniversary

A portrait of Shastri hangs in the Central Hall of the Parliament House of India. The portrait, painted by Vidya Bhushan, was unveiled by the then President of India, Dr. Shanker Dayal Sharma on 2 October 1993.

== In popular culture ==
Shastri's life and death, in particular, have been a subject of Indian popular culture. Homage to Lal Bahadur Shastri is a 1967 short documentary film directed by S. Sukhdev and produced by the Films Division of India which pays tribute to the former prime minister. Apne Shastri Ji (1986) was also made as a homage to him.

Jai Jawaan Jai Kisaan is a 2015 Indian Hindi-language biographical drama film by Milan Ajmera, titled after the popular slogan by Shastri it portrays his entire life from birth to death where he is portrayed by Akhilesh Jain. Lal Bahadur Shastri's Death, a 2018 television documentary film by Jyoti Kapur Das reconstructs his death and covers various conspiracy theories around it, including interviews with his son Sunil Shastri. A film titled The Tashkent Files (2019), directed by Vivek Agnihotri revolves around the mystery of the death of Lal Bahadur Shastri.

Pradhanmantri (lit. 'Prime Minister'), a 2013 Indian documentary television series which aired on ABP News and covers the various policies and political tenures of Indian PMs, dedicated the entire seventh episode "Lal Bahadur Shastri" to his term as the country's leader with Akhil Mishra in the role of Shastri.

The 1967 Bollywood film Upkar by Manoj Kumar, which is based on the 1965 war, was dedicated to Shastri. It also eulogised him in the song "Mere Desh Ki Dharti" when the hero exclaims "Rang Lal hai Lal Bahadur se". Lal Bahadur Shastri, a 2014 Indian Malayalam-language comedy film by Rejishh Midhila is titled after the prime minister but has no apparent connection with his life.

== See also ==
- List of prime ministers of India
- List of unsolved deaths
- List of heads of state and government who died in office

Political offices
Preceded by Govind Ballabh Pant	Minister of Home Affairs; 1961–1963	Succeeded by Gulzarilal Nanda
Preceded by Gulzarilal Nanda; Acting	Minister of External Affairs; 1964	Succeeded by Sardar Swaran Singh
Preceded by Gulzarilal Nanda; Acting	Prime Minister of India; 1964–1966	Succeeded by Gulzarilal Nanda; Acting
Preceded by Gulzarilal Nanda; Acting	Chairperson of the Planning Commission; 1966	Succeeded by Gulzarilal Nanda; Acting
