= Salikram Jaiswal =

Indian freedom fighter and politician

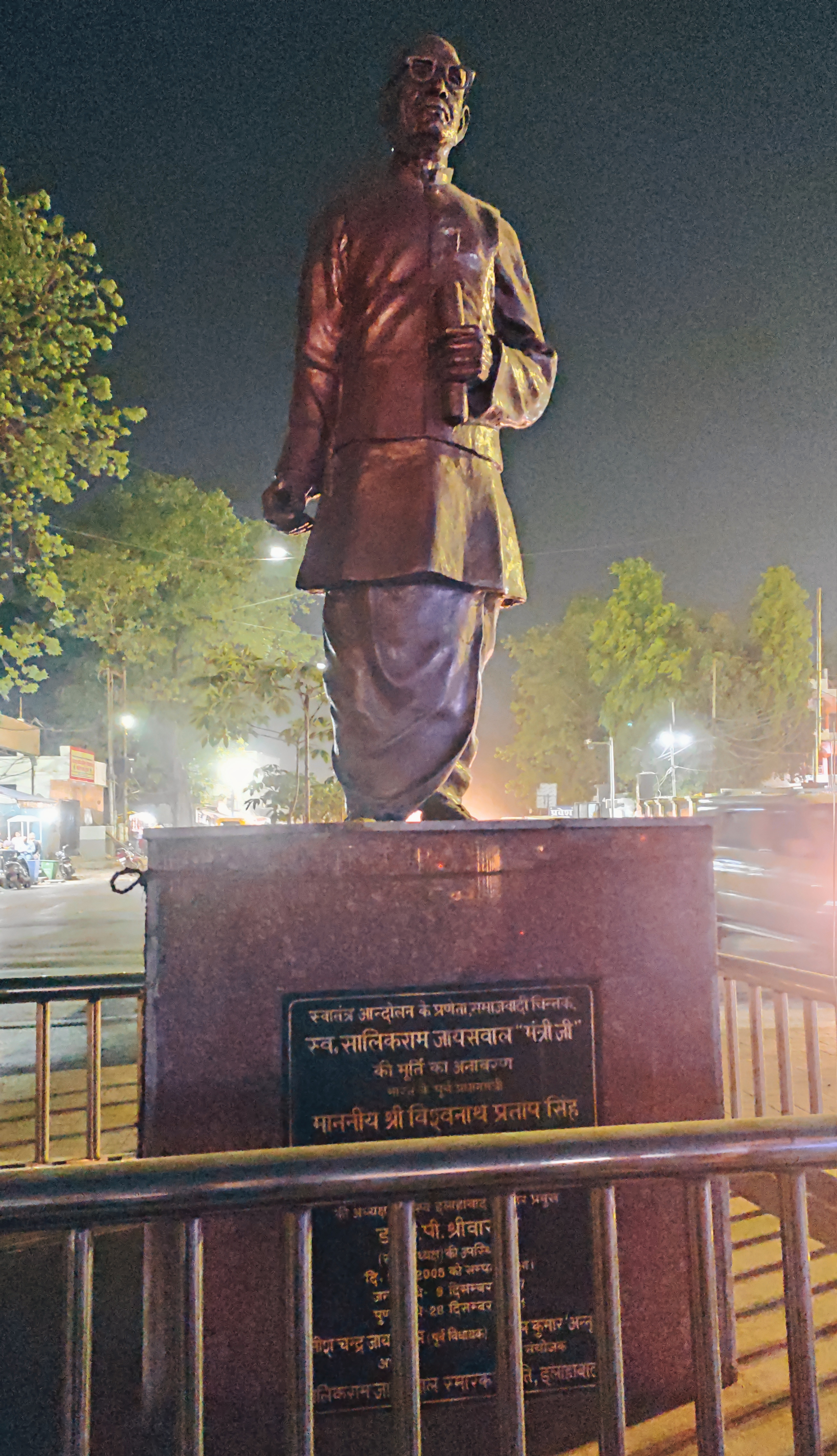
- Statue of Salikram Jaiswal

Member of Uttar Pradesh Legislative Assembly
- In office 1948; 1953-1957; 1962-1967

Member of Uttar Pradesh Legislative Council
- In office 1973

Health Minister, Government of Uttar Pradesh
- In office 1974–1974

Personal details
- Born: 9 December 1907 Bahadurganj, Allahabad, United Provinces of Agra and Oudh, British India
- Died: 28 December 1981 (aged 74) Allahabad, Uttar Pradesh, India
- Party: Indian National Congress (before 1948; after 1970s)
- Other political affiliations: Praja Socialist Party; Samyukta Socialist Party
- Education: Ewing Christian College, University of Allahabad
- Occupation: Freedom fighter, politician

Saligram Jaiswal (9 December 1907 – 28 December 1981) was a freedom fighter and socialist politician from Prayagraj, Uttar Pradesh in India. He was also a Health Minister in the Government of Uttar Pradesh, under Hemwati Nandan Bahuguna, though he resigned from his position in 1974 after the government reinstated land revenue for land holdings up to 6.25 acres. He died on 28 December 1981 in Allahabad.

== Early life ==
Salikram Jaiswal was born on 9 December 1907 in the Bahadurganj area of Allahabad (present-day Prayagraj). He received his education from Ewing Christian College and the University of Allahabad.

== Participation in India's freedom struggle ==
Salikram Jaiswal joined the Indian National Congress in 1928 and took part in the Civil Disobedience Movement in 1930, which led to his arrest. In 1939, he was arrested again during a meeting held in Handia, where he defended himself in court but was sentenced to six months of imprisonment. His contribution to India's freedom struggle continued with his participation in the Individual Satyagraha of 1941 and the Quit India Movement of 1942. Jaiswal was arrested a total of five times and spent seven years in prison.

== Political career ==
He was a member of Indian National Congress, where he was the secretary of District Congress Committee from 1932 to 1942. In 1934, he was elected a member of Allahabad Municipal Board along with K. D. Malviya, Lal Bahadur Shastri and Vijay Lakshmi Pandit.

After India's independence, Salikram Jaiswal left the Indian National Congress due to differences with the party leadership. In 1948, he was elected as a member of the Uttar Pradesh Legislative Assembly, and he successfully won elections again in 1953 and 1962.

Subsequently, he joined the Praja Socialist Party and was its president during the Allahabad convention. Later, he joined the breakaway Samyukta Socialist Party (SSP) and was a member of its National Executive. In 1970, he was the unanimous SSP nominee to contest the election for Mayor of Allahabad, though he stood as an independent. However, he lost the election to another independent candidate, S. N. Kacker, by two votes.

However, under the influence of Indira Gandhi, Salikram Jaiswal later rejoined the Indian National Congress. In 1973, he became a member of the Uttar Pradesh Legislative Council, and in 1974, he was appointed as the Health Minister in the Government of Uttar Pradesh. However, due to ideological differences, he resigned from the council of ministers.

== Legacy ==
In May 2022, the Prayagraj Municipal Corporation approved the renaming of the Mutthiganj locality to "Salikram Jaiswal Nagar". The renaming had originally been announced in 1982 and a commemorative plaque had also been installed, but the decision remained pending for 40 years. This change was made in honour of the freedom fighter and socialist leader Salikram Jaiswal.
