= Murli Manohar Joshi =

Indian politician and academic (born 1934)

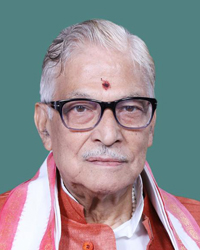
- Official portrait, 2014

Union Minister of Human Resource Development
- In office 19 March 1998 – 22 May 2004
- Prime Minister: Atal Bihari Vajpayee
- Preceded by: S. R. Bommai
- Succeeded by: Arjun Singh

3rd National President of the Bharatiya Janata Party
- In office 1991–1993
- Preceded by: Lal Krishna Advani
- Succeeded by: Lal Krishna Advani

Union Minister of Home Affairs
- In office 16 May 1996 – 1 June 1996
- Prime Minister: Atal Bihari Vajpayee
- Preceded by: Shankarrao Chavan
- Succeeded by: H. D. Deve Gowda

Union Minister of Science and Technology
- In office 19 March 1998 – 21 May 2004
- Prime Minister: Atal Bihari Vajpayee
- Preceded by: Yoginder K Alagh
- Succeeded by: Kapil Sibal

Member of Parliament, Lok Sabha
- In office 16 May 2014 – 23 May 2019
- Preceded by: Sriprakash Jaiswal
- Succeeded by: Satyadev Pachauri
- Constituency: Kanpur, Uttar Pradesh
- In office 16 May 2009 – 16 May 2014
- Preceded by: Rajesh Kumar Mishra
- Succeeded by: Narendra Modi
- Constituency: Varanasi, Uttar Pradesh
- In office 10 May 1996 — 17 May 2004
- Preceded by: Saroj Dubey
- Succeeded by: Rewati Raman Singh
- Constituency: Allahabad, Uttar Pradesh
- In office 22 March 1977 – 10 January 1980
- Preceded by: Narendra Singh Bisht
- Succeeded by: Harish Rawat
- Constituency: Almora, Uttar Pradesh

Member of Parliament, Rajya Sabha
- In office 5 July 1992 – 11 May 1996
- Constituency: Uttar Pradesh

Personal details
- Born: 5 January 1934 (age 92) Delhi, British India
- Party: Bharatiya Janata Party (since 1980)
- Other political affiliations: Janata Party (1977-1980); Bharatiya Jana Sangh (1957-1977)
- Spouse: Tarla Joshi
- Education: BSc, MSc, PhD; University of Allahabad
- Awards: Padma Vibhushan (2017)
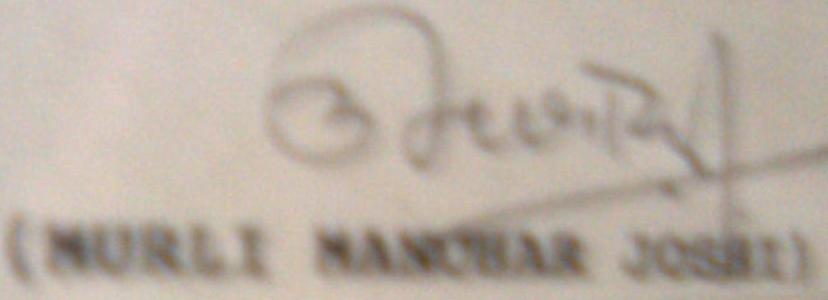
- Signature

Murli Manohar Joshi (born 5 January 1934) is an Indian politician and physicist. He is one of the founding members and a senior leader of the Bharatiya Janata Party (BJP) and served as its president from 1991 to 1993. In addition to his role in the BJP, he is a lifelong member of the Rashtriya Swayamsevak Sangh (RSS), a Hindutva paramilitary organisation. Joshi is a former Member of Parliament from Kanpur Lok Sabha constituency. He is a former professor of physics in University of Allahabad. Joshi later became the Union Human Resources & Development Minister in the National Democratic Alliance government. Joshi was awarded Padma Vibhushan, the second-highest civilian award, in 2017 by the Government of India.

== Background and personal life ==
Joshi was born in Delhi on 5 January 1934. His family hails from Almora in Kumaon region, which is now part of the Uttarakhand state. His father's name was Manmohan Joshi. In 1966, Joshi was married to Tarla Joshi, a lady of his own community and similar family background, in a match arranged by their families in the usual Indian way. The lifelong marriage has proven entirely harmonious and conventional. The couple are the parents of two daughters, Nivedita and Priyamvada.

== Education ==
Joshi had his early education in Chandpur, Bijnor district and in Almora, from where his family hails. He completed his B.Sc. from Meerut College and M.Sc. from University of Allahabad. In Allahabad, one of his teachers was Rajendra Singh, who later became the Sarsanghchalak of the Rashtriya Swayamsevak Sangh.

Joshi did his doctorate in physics at University of Allahabad. The subject of his doctoral thesis was spectroscopy. He published a research paper in Physics in Hindi, which was a first of its kind. After completing his PhD, Joshi started teaching physics at University of Allahabad.

== Politics and activism ==
Joshi came in contact with the RSS in Delhi at a young age and took part in the Cow Protection Movement in 1953–54, in the Kumbh Kisan Andolan of UP in 1955, demanding halving of land revenue assessment. During the Emergency period (1975–1977) in India, Joshi was in jail from 26 June 1975 until the Lok Sabha elections in 1977. He was elected Member of Parliament from Almora. When the Janata Party (which then included his party) came to power forming the first non-Congress government in Indian history, Joshi was elected General Secretary of the Janata Parliamentary Party. After the fall of the government, his party came out of Janata Party in 1980, and formed the Bharatiya Janata Party or the BJP. Joshi first looked after the Central Office as a General Secretary and later became Party Treasurer. As General Secretary of BJP, he was directly in charge of Bihar, Bengal and North-Eastern States. Later, when BJP formed a government in India under Atal Bihari Vajpayee, Joshi served as the Human Resource Development Minister in the cabinet.

In December 1991, Joshi held a yatra, the Ekta Yatra, intended to signal that BJP supported national unity and opposed separatist movements. It began on 11 December in Kanyakumari, Tamil Nadu and visited 14 states. The rally's final stop to hoist the Indian flag in Jammu and Kashmir on 26 January 1992 was considered unsuccessful, with minimal local participation.

Joshi is known to have been influenced by the life and work of Babasaheb Ambedkar, Mahatma Jyotiba Phule and Deendayal Upadhyaya. Joshi was a three-term M.P. from Allahabad before he was defeated in the Lok Sabha elections of May 2004. He won election to the 15th Lok Sabha from Varanasi as a BJP candidate. He also served as the home minister for 13 days government in 1996. Joshi was appointed as Chairman of the Manifesto Preparation Board of the BJP in 2009. He was honoured as "Proud Past Alumni" of Allahabad University by Allahabad University Alumni Association.

He was a sitting MP from Varanasi and he vacated that seat for Narendra Modi in 2014 Lok Sabha Elections. He later contested from Kanpur and won from the constituency by a margin of 2.23 lac votes.

== Awards and honours ==
=== National honours ===
- India
  - Padma Vibhushan (2017)

=== Foreign honours ===
- Mongolia
  - Friendship Medal (2002)
- Russia
  - Order of Friendship (2013)

=== Honorary degrees ===
- (Ukraine) Kyiv Polytechnic Institute:
  - Doctor of Science (DSC) (2003)
- (India) Doon University:
  - Doctor of Science (DSC) (2018)

=== Other awards ===
- Honorary Fellow of Russian Academy of Natural Sciences (2001)
- Nikolay Rerikh Medal, International Academy of Ecology, Man and Nature Protection Sciences (2001)
- Outstanding Parliamentarian Award (2009)

Lok Sabha
Preceded by Narendra Singh Bisht	Member of Parliament for Almora; 1977 – 1980	Succeeded by Harish Rawat
Preceded by Saroj Dubey	Member of Parliament for Allahabad; 1996 – 2004	Succeeded by Rewati Raman Singh
Preceded by Rajesh Kumar Mishra	Member of Parliament for Varanasi; 2009 – 2014	Succeeded by Narendra Modi
Rajya Sabha
Preceded by N/A	Member of Parliament for Uttar Pradesh; 1992 – 1996	Succeeded by N/A
Preceded by N/A	Member of Parliament for Uttar Pradesh; 2004 – 2009	Succeeded by Shriram Pal
Party political offices
Preceded by L. K. Advani	President; Bharatiya Janata Party; 1991 – 1993	Succeeded by L. K. Advani
