= Nand Gopal Gupta =

Indian politician

Cabinet Minister Government of Uttar Pradesh
- Incumbent
- Assumed office 25 March 2022
- Governor: Anandiben Patel
- Chief Minister: Yogi Adityanath
- Ministry & Department's: Industrial Development; Export Promotion; NRI; Investment Promotion
- In office 19 March 2017 – 12 March 2022
- Governor: Ram Naik; Anandiben Patel
- Chief Minister: Yogi Adityanath
- Ministry & Department's: Civil Aviation; Political Pension; Minority Welfare; Muslim Waqf and Haj
- In office 18 October 2007 – 18 March 2012
- Governor: T. V. Rajeswar; Banwari Lal Joshi
- Chief Minister: Mayawati
- Ministry & Department's: Institutional Finance; Stamp; Court Fees

Member of Uttar Pradesh Legislative Assembly
- Incumbent
- Assumed office 11 March 2017
- Preceded by: Haji Parvej Ahmad
- Constituency: Prayagraj South
- In office 13 May 2007 – 8 March 2012
- Preceded by: Keshari Nath Tripathi
- Succeeded by: Haji Parvej Ahmad
- Constituency: Prayagraj South

Personal details
- Born: April 23, 1974 (age 52) Prayagraj, Uttar Pradesh (then Allahabad)
- Party: Bharatiya Janata Party (2017-Present)
- Other political affiliations: Indian National Congress (2014-2017); Bahujan Samaj Party (Before 2014)
- Spouse: Abhilasha Gupta (m.1994)
- Children: 2 (son's), 1 (daughter)
- Parent: Late Suresh Chandra Gupta (father)
- Profession: Business, Industry
- Website: http://nandgopalguptanandi.in

Nand Gopal Gupta ‘Nandi’ (born 23 April 1974) is an Indian politician who currently serves as the Cabinet Minister for Industrial Development, Export Promotion, NRI and Investment Promotion in the Uttar Pradesh Government. He is also a Member of the Legislative Assembly (MLA) from Prayagraj South constituency and is affiliated with the Bharatiya Janata Party (BJP).

== Family ==
Gupta is married to Abhilasha Gupta, who serves as the National Brand Ambassador for the Pradhan Mantri Jan Kalyan Yojna (Prachar Prasar Abhiyaan). Abhilasha has had her own political career, having been elected as the Mayor of Prayagraj Municipal Corporation, first on a Bahujan Samaj Party (BSP) ticket in 2012 and later on a BJP ticket in 2017.

== Political career ==
In 2007, Gupta was elected to the Legislative Assembly of Uttar Pradesh from the Prayagraj South Assembly constituency as a candidate of the Bahujan Samaj Party (BSP). In the 2012 assembly elections, he was defeated by Samajwadi Party candidate Haji Parvej Ahmad in the Prayagraj South seat. In the national elections of 2014, he sought election to the Lok Sabha as an Indian National Congress candidate from Prayagraj but lost. In 2017, he was elected to the Uttar Pradesh assembly from Prayagraj South Assembly constituency for the BJP.

At present he is Cabinet Minister of Minority Affairs, Political Pension and Civil Aviation in the BJP-led Government of Uttar Pradesh.

In July 2020, a First Information Report (FIR) was filed against Gupta alleging that he forcefully had his people paint all the houses saffron along with pictures of Hindu deities in his colony without obtaining the consent of house owners or the residents.

== Personal life ==
Gupta is married to Abhilasha Gupta, who is also a politician. He was seriously injured in a 2010 bomb attack in Prayagraj, for which fellow MLA Vijay Mishra is among those who have been charged.
