= Sunil Shastri =

Indian politician

Sunil Shastri सुनील शास्त्री

Member of Parliament, Rajya Sabha
- In office 22 May 2002 – 25 November 2002

Member of Legislative Assembly, Uttar Pradesh
- In office 1980–1989
- Preceded by: Awadhesh Kumar Srivastava
- Succeeded by: Shiv Pratap Shukla
- Constituency: Gorakhpur Urban

Minister of Energy, Government of Uttar Pradesh
- In office 1985–1987

Minister of Heavy Industries, Institutional Finance and Public Enterprises, Government of Uttar Pradesh
- In office 1989–1991

Personal details
- Born: 13 February 1950 (age 75) Lucknow, Uttar Pradesh, India
- Political party: Indian National Congress (before 2009, 2021—present); Bharatiya Janata Party (2009—2021)
- Spouse: Meera Shastri (m. 1973)
- Children: 3 sons
- Parent(s): Lal Bahadur Shastri; Lalita Shastri
- Relatives: Hari Krishna Shastri; Anil Shastri

Sunil Shastri (born 13 February 1950) is an Indian politician and a former cabinet minister in the Government of Uttar Pradesh. He is the son of Lal Bahadur Shastri, the second Prime Minister of India. Before joining politics, he served the Bank of India as an Officer in different capacities for fourteen years. He was also elected to Uttar Pradesh Legislative Assembly from Gorakhpur Urban assembly constituency as INC candidate. His son Vinamra Shastri is a corporate leader and writes about politics. He fought against V. P. Singh from Allahabad Lok Sabha seat on Congress party ticket, but lost.
