= Anil Shastri =

Indian politician

Anil Kumar Shastri
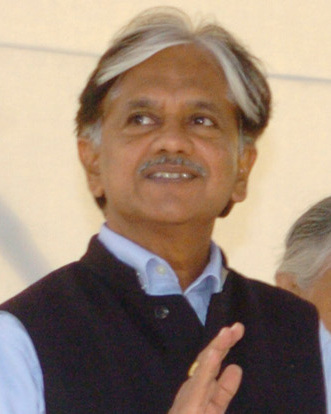

Member of Parliament, Lok Sabha
- In office 1989–1991
- Preceded by: Shyamlal Yadav
- Succeeded by: Shrish Chandra Dikshit
- Constituency: Varanasi

Personal details
- Born: 4 June 1948 (age 78)
- Party: Indian National Congress
- Other political affiliations: Janata Dal
- Children: 3
- Parents: Lal Bahadur Shastri (father); Lalita Shastri (mother)
- Relatives: Hari Krishna Shastri; Sunil Shastri
- Education: Ashridge Executive Education at Hult International Business School

Anil Kumar Shastri (born 4 June 1948) is an Indian politician and a senior leader of the Indian National Congress. He is known for his outspoken views. Presently, he is Chairman of the Hindi Department in All India Congress Committee. He was elected to the ninth Lok Sabha from Varanasi in 1989 as member of Janata Dal and was a Minister in the Ministry of Finance, Govt. of India.

== Early life ==
Anil Shastri was born in Lucknow to Lal Bahadur Shastri, a former Prime Minister of India and Lalita Shastri. He is an alumnus of St. Columba's School, Delhi and St. Stephen’s College, Delhi. He completed his Advanced Management Programme at Ashridge Business School, now part of Hult International Business School.

== Career ==
=== Social and educational activities ===
He has been instrumental in promoting higher education particularly in the field of management. He has set up three institutions and is the Chairman of Lal Bahadur Shastri Institute of Management, Delhi, Lal Bahadur Shastri Institute of Management & Technology, Bareilly, Lal Bahadur Shastri Institute of Technology & Management, Indore and Lal Bahadur Shastri polytechnic, Manda, Allahabad. Anil Shastri is Holding Trustee of Lal Bahadur Shastri National Memorial Trust which is involved with various socio-cultural activities. Anil Shastri also worked with a leading TATA Company, Voltas for seventeen years in senior positions.

His son Adarsh Shastri has worked in the corporate world for 17 years in senior positions who quit his job with Apple and joined the Aam Aadmi Party. He unsuccessfully contested the 2014 Lok Sabha elections from Allahabad, UP constituency and then won Feb. 2015 Delhi Assembly elections from Dwarka Constituency of Delhi.

== Positions held ==
- Member of Parliament (for Janata Dal), ninth Lok Sabha, Varanasi, 1989
- Minister in the Ministry of Finance, Govt. of India

== Publications ==
- Pavan Choudary and Anil Shastri. Lal Bahadur Shastri: Lessons in Leadership. Wisdom Village Publications, 2014. ISBN 9789380710365.

== See also ==
- Lal Bahadur Shastri Former prime minister of India
