= List of people from Kanpur =

The following is a list of notable people associated with the Indian city of Kanpur, Uttar Pradesh. These people were born or lived in Kanpur.

== A ==
- Manindra Agrawal
- Subhashini Ali
- Surinder Amarnath
- Abhishek Avasthi
- Abhijeet Bhattacharya

== B ==
- Aparnaa Bajpai
- Valentine Bambrick
- Shamim Bano
- Frank Bellew
- Raghunandan Singh Bhadauria
- Abhijeet Bhattacharya
- Abhay Bhushan
- Bryce Chudleigh Burt
- James Bush (sportsman)
- Harcourt Butler

== C ==
- Naresh Chander Chaturvedi
- Sharvee Chaturvedi
- Cecil Clementi
- Sibyl, Lady Colefax

== D ==
- Poonam Dhillon
- Ashwni Dhir
- Jagatvir Singh Drona

== G ==
- Rohan Gavaskar
- Anirvan Ghosh
- Mahendra Mohan Gupta
- Shyam Lal Gupta

== H ==
- Harish-Chandra
- Sir Henry Havelock-Allan, 1st Baronet
- Jan Holden
- Adrian A. Husain

== I ==
- Shazia Ilmi

== J ==
- Rashid Jahan
- Shriprakash Jaiswal
- Sunil Jogi

== K ==
- Mohammad Kaif
- Premlata Katiyar
- Ajay Kapoor (politician)
- Abul Khair Kashfi
- Vinay Katiyar
- Hard Kaur
- Azimullah Khan
- Imran Khan (cricketer, born May 1973)
- Gaurav Khanna
- Giriraj Kishore
- Radhey Shyam Kori
- Ram Nath Kovind
- Sucheta Kriplani
- Dev Kumar
- Saket Kushwaha

== M ==
- Mina MacKenzie
- Satish Mahana
- Ajai Malhotra
- Alice Marval
- Alhaj Minnatullah
- Irshad Mirza
- Amit Mishra (cricketer, born 1991)
- Satish Mishra
- Vishal Mishra
- Bal Chandra Misra
- Gopal Shankar Misra
- Narendra Mohan
- Haseena Moin
- Henry Montgomery (bishop)
- Robert Montgomery (colonial administrator)

== P ==
- Raja Ram Pal
- Fanny Parkes
- William Peel (Royal Navy officer)

== R ==
- Altaf Raja
- Baji Rao II
- Frederick Roberts, 1st Earl Roberts
- Clement Daniel Rockey
- Pradeep Rohatgi
- John Forbes Royle
- John Ryan (VC 1857)

== S ==
- Rakesh Sachan
- Amit Sadh
- Lakshmi Sahgal
- Nana Sahib
- Kratika Sengar
- Gopal Sharma
- Anand Shukla
- Rajeev Shukla
- Rakesh Shukla
- Rishabh Shukla
- Amit Sial
- Anurag Singh
- Ram Swaroop Singh
- Irfan Solanki
- Raju Srivastav
- Raju Srivastava
- Tanmay Srivastava, Cricketer
- Virendra Swarup
- Jagendra Swarup

== T ==
- Laxmi Ganesh Tewari
- Mowbray Thomson
- Ankit Tiwari
- Aseem Trivedi
- Ragini Trivedi

== U ==
- Amin Ullah

== V ==
- Atal Bihari Vajpayee
- Maharishi Valmiki
- Purnima Verma
- Ganesh Shankar Vidyarthi
- Salil Vishnoi

== W ==
- Nushoor Wahidi
- Bob Woolmer
- Sheila Wright

== Y ==
- Abhishek Yadav
- Chaudhary Harmohan Singh Yadav
- Kuldeep Yadav
