= Kanpur Lok Sabha constituency =

Lok Sabha constituency in Uttar Pradesh

Coordinates: 26.46°N 80.32°E

Kanpur UP-43
- Lok Sabha constituency
- Interactive Map Outlining Kanpur Lok Sabha constituency

Constituency details
- Country: India
- Region: North India
- State: Uttar Pradesh
- Assembly constituencies: Govind Nagar; Sisamau; Arya Nagar; Kidwai Nagar; Kanpur Cantt.
- Established: 1952
- Reservation: None

Member of Parliament
- 18th Lok Sabha
- Incumbent Ramesh Awasthi
- Party: Bharatiya Janata Party
- Elected year: 2024

Kanpur Lok Sabha constituency is one of the 80 Lok Sabha (parliamentary) constituencies in Uttar Pradesh state in northern India. The constituency covers almost one-fourth of the area of Kanpur city and is hundred percent urban. The rest of the city comes under Akbarpur Lok Sabha constituency and the outgrowths across Ganga river are the part of Unnao Lok Sabha constituency. Some suburbs of the city like Chobepur and parts of Mandhana lie in Misrikh Lok Sabha constituency.

== Assembly segments ==
| No | Name | District | Member | Party | 2024 Lead |
|---|---|---|---|---|---|
| 212 | Govind Nagar | Kanpur Nagar | Surendra Maithani | BJP | BJP |
| 213 | Sishamau | Kanpur Nagar | Naseem Solanki | SP | INC |
| 214 | Arya Nagar | Kanpur Nagar | Amitabh Bajpai | SP | INC |
| 215 | Kidwai Nagar | Kanpur Nagar | Mahesh Trivedi | BJP | BJP |
| 216 | Kanpur Cantt. | Kanpur Nagar | Mohammad Hassan Roomi | SP | INC |

== Members of Parliament ==
| Year | Name | Party |
|---|---|---|
| 1952 | Harihar Nath Shastri | Indian National Congress |
| 1952 | Shiv Narayan Tandon | Indian National Congress |
| 1952 | Raja Ram Shastri | Praja Socialist Party |
| 1957 | S. M. Banerjee | Independent politician |
| 1962 | S. M. Banerjee | Independent politician |
| 1967 | S. M. Banerjee | Independent politician |
| 1971 | S. M. Banerjee | Independent politician |
| 1977 | Manohar Lal | Janata Party |
| 1980 | Arif Mohammed Khan | Indian National Congress |
| 1984 | Naresh Chandra Chaturvedi | Indian National Congress |
| 1989 | Subhashini Ali | Communist Party of India (Marxist) |
| 1991 | Jagat Vir Singh Drona | Bharatiya Janata Party |
| 1996 | Jagat Vir Singh Drona | Bharatiya Janata Party |
| 1998 | Jagat Vir Singh Drona | Bharatiya Janata Party |
| 1999 | Sriprakash Jaiswal | Indian National Congress |
| 2004 | Sriprakash Jaiswal | Indian National Congress |
| 2009 | Sriprakash Jaiswal | Indian National Congress |
| 2014 | Murli Manohar Joshi | Bharatiya Janata Party |
| 2019 | Satyadev Pachauri | Bharatiya Janata Party |
| 2024 | Ramesh Awasthi | Bharatiya Janata Party |

== Election results ==
=== 2024 ===
2024 Indian general elections: Kanpur
| Party | Candidate | Votes | % | ±% |
|---|---|---|---|---|
| BJP | Ramesh Awasthi | 443,055 | 49.93 | ▼5.70 |
| INC | Alok Misra | 422,087 | 47.56 | ▲10.43 |
| BSP | Kuldeep Bhadauria | 12,032 | 1.36 | ▲1.36 |
| NOTA | None of the Above | 4,117 | 0.46 | ▼0.02 |
| Majority | | 20,968 | 2.37 | ▼16.13 |
| Turnout | | 887,396 | 53.30 | ▲1.68 |
| BJP hold | | Swing | ▼5.70 | |

=== 2019 ===
2019 Indian general elections: Kanpur
| Party | Candidate | Votes | % | ±% |
|---|---|---|---|---|
| BJP | Satyadev Pachauri | 468,937 | 55.63 | −1.22 |
| INC | Sriprakash Jaiswal | 3,13,003 | 37.13 | +6.98 |
| SP | Ram Kumar | 48,275 | 5.73 | −3.72 |
| SJP | Alok Kumar | 1,885 | 0.22 | New |
| BSCP | Poonam Shukla | 1,130 | 0.13 | New |
| NOTA | None of the Above | 4,057 | 0.48 | +0.21 |
| Majority | | 1,55,934 | 18.50 | −8.20 |
| Turnout | | 8,42,994 | 51.62 | −0.21 |
| BJP hold | | Swing | -1.22 | |

=== 2014 ===
2014 Indian general elections: Kanpur
| Party | Candidate | Votes | % | ±% |
|---|---|---|---|---|
| BJP | Dr. Murli Manohar Joshi | 474,712 | 56.85 | ▲18.62 |
| INC | Sriprakash Jaiswal | 251,766 | 30.15 | ▼11.77 |
| BSP | Saleem Ahmad | 53,218 | 6.37 | ▼3.06 |
| SP | Surendra Mohan Agarwal | 25,723 | 3.08 | ▼3.73 |
| AAP | Mahmood Hussain Rehmani | 11,925 | 1.43 | ▲1.43 |
| Independent | Kishore Bajpai | 3,005 | 0.36 | ▲0.36 |
| Independent | Prem Chandra Pandey | 2,350 | 0.28 | ▲0.28 |
| NOTA | None of the Above | 2,278 | 0.27 | ▲0.27 |
| Majority | | 222,946 | 26.70 | ▲23.01 |
| Turnout | | 835,079 | 51.83 | ▲14.93 |
| BJP gain from INC | | Swing | ▲14.93 | |

=== 2009 ===
2009 Indian general elections: Kanpur
| Party | Candidate | Votes | % | ±% |
|---|---|---|---|---|
| INC | Sriprakash Jaiswal | 2,14,988 | 41.92 | +7.80 |
| BJP | Satish Mahana | 1,96,082 | 38.23 | +5.02 |
| BSP | Sukhda Mishra | 48,374 | 9.43 | +4.91 |
| SP | Surendra Mohan Agarwal | 34,919 | 6.81 | −18.95 |
| Independent | Ahamed Hussain | 3,728 | 0.73 | 0 |
| BPD | Omendra Bharat | 3,237 | 0.63 | 0 |
| Independent | Maya Kaushal | 2,503 | 0.49 | 0 |
| Independent | Mohammad Isha | 2,394 | 0.47 | 0 |
| Independent | Nisha | 1,463 | 0.29 | 0 |
| Independent | V. N. Awasthi | 1,274 | 0.25 | 0 |
| Majority | | 18,906 | 3.69 | +2.78 |
| Turnout | | 5,12,878 | 36.90 | −6.45 |
| INC hold | | Swing | +2.78 | |

=== 2004 ===
2004 Indian general elections: Kanpur
| Party | Candidate | Votes | % | ±% |
|---|---|---|---|---|
| INC | Shriprakash Jaiswal | 2,11,109 | 34.12 | −12.07 |
| BJP | Satya Dev Pachauri | 2,05,471 | 33.21 | −7.56 |
| SP | Haji Mushtaq Solanki | 1,59,361 | 25.76 | +19.36 |
| BSP | Anubhav | 27,962 | 4.52 | +0.37 |
| CPI(M) | Subhashini Ali | 4,558 | 0.74 | |
| Independent | Mohd. Hanim (Kinner Ramkali) | 1,975 | 0.32 | |
| ABHM | Chandra Prakash | 1,607 | 0.26 | |
| Independent | Saroj Rahi | 1,070 | 0.17 | |
| AD(K) | Sunil Patel | 957 | 0.15 | |
| Independent | Ravi Shankar Balmiki | 945 | 0.15 | |
| Independent | Jagannath Mistri | 822 | 0.13 | |
| Independent | Chandramani | 721 | 0.12 | |
| Independent | Ram Ratan | 644 | 0.10 | |
| Independent | Ajeet Mohan | 615 | 0.10 | |
| RLD | Manohar Lal | 477 | 0.08 | |
| Independent | Sanjeev Pandey | 427 | 0.07 | |
| Majority | | 5,638 | 0.91 | |
| Turnout | | 6,18,721 | 43.35 | |
| INC hold | | Swing | -12.07 | |

=== 1999 ===
1999 Indian general election: Kanpur
| Party | Candidate | Votes | % | ±% |
|---|---|---|---|---|
| INC | Shriprakash Jaiswal | 2,93,610 | 46.19 | |
| BJP | Jagat Vir Singh Drona | 2,59,151 | 40.77 | |
| SP | Shyam Lal Gupta | 40,690 | 6.40 | |
| BSP | Man Singh Bagga | 26,376 | 4.15 | |
| Independent | Santosh Kumar | 3,638 | 0.49 | |
| Independent | S. M. Tariq Anwar | 3,275 | 0.47 | |
| Majority | | 34,459 | 5.42 | |
| Turnout | | 6,35,624 | 44.83 | |
| INC gain from BJP | | Swing | | |

=== 1998 ===
1998 Indian general election: Kanpur
| Party | Candidate | Votes | % | ±% |
|---|---|---|---|---|
| BJP | Jagat Vir Singh Drona | 3,35,996 | 49.39 | |
| SP | Surendra Mohan Agarwal | 1,99,987 | 29.40 | |
| INC | Sriprakash Jaiswal | 90,274 | 13.27 | |
| BSP | Pawan Kumar Gupta | 49,474 | 7.27 | |
| Independent | Iqbal Siddiqui | 812 | 0.12 | |
| Majority | | 1,36,009 | 19.99 | |
| Turnout | | 6,80,263 | 48.52 | |
| BJP hold | | Swing | | |

=== 1996 ===
1996 Indian general election: Kanpur
| Party | Candidate | Votes | % | ±% |
|---|---|---|---|---|
| BJP | Jagat Vir Singh Drona | 2,97,550 | 52.19 | |
| CPI(M) | Subhashini Ali | 1,46,460 | 25.69 | |
| BSP | Sharfuddin Ahmad | 51,333 | 9.00 | |
| INC | Bhudhar Narayan Mishra | 47,403 | 8.31 | |
| Independent | Satya Narain | 2,621 | 0.46 | |
| Majority | | 1,51,090 | 26.50 | |
| Turnout | | 5,70,127 | 41.53 | |
| BJP hold | | Swing | | |

=== 1991 ===
1991 Indian general election: Kanpur
| Party | Candidate | Votes | % | ±% |
|---|---|---|---|---|
| BJP | Jagat Vir Singh Drona | 1,93,275 | 47.97 | |
| INC | Ram Narayan Pathak | 79,654 | 19.77 | |
| CPI(M) | Subhashini Ali | 70,912 | 17.60 | |
| JP | Tasneem Ashraf | 30,672 | 7.61 | |
| BSP | Ram Nath | 15,874 | 3.94 | |
| LKD | Ram Singh Yadav | 2,035 | 0.51 | |
| Majority | | 1,13,621 | 28.20 | |
| Turnout | | 4,02,868 | 37.71 | |
| BJP gain from CPI(M) | | Swing | | |

=== 1989 ===
1989 Indian general election: Kanpur
| Party | Candidate | Votes | % | ±% |
|---|---|---|---|---|
| CPI(M) | Subhashini Ali | 1,74,438 | 41.06 | |
| BJP | Jagat Vir Singh Drona | 1,17,851 | 27.74 | |
| INC | Naresh Chandra Chaturvedi | 98,112 | 23.10 | |
| BSP | Sharif | 11,219 | 2.64 | |
| Independent | Guru Rajkumar Singh Ambedkar | 4,159 | 0.98 | |
| Majority | | 56,587 | 13.32 | |
| Turnout | | 4,24,808 | 40.57 | |
| CPI(M) gain from INC | | Swing | | |

=== 1984 ===
1984 Indian general election: Kanpur
| Party | Candidate | Votes | % | ±% |
|---|---|---|---|---|
| INC | Naresh Chandra Chaturvedi | 2,14,160 | 56.92 | |
| JP | Syed Shahabuddin | 76,791 | 20.41 | |
| BJP | Somnath Shukla | 37,451 | 9.95 | |
| LKD | Shyam Mishra | 23,439 | 6.23 | |
| Independent | Ambika Prasad Sultaniya | 7,947 | 2.11 | |
| Majority | | 1,37,369 | 36.51 | |
| Turnout | | 3,76,216 | 55.94 | |
| INC hold | | Swing | | |

=== 1980 ===
1980 Indian general election: Kanpur
| Party | Candidate | Votes | % | ±% |
|---|---|---|---|---|
| INC(I) | Arif Mohammad Khan | 1,63,230 | 45.49 | |
| JP | Maqbool Husain Kureshi | 88,049 | 24.54 | |
| Independent | Bhagwati Prasad Dixit | 51,717 | 14.41 | |
| JP(S) | Manohar Lal | 42,795 | 11.93 | |
| Independent | Om Prakash | 2,385 | 0.66 | |
| Majority | | 75,181 | 20.95 | |
| Turnout | | 3,58,848 | 50.74 | |
| INC(I) gain from JP | | Swing | | |

=== 1977 ===
1977 Indian general election: Kanpur
| Party | Candidate | Votes | % | ±% |
|---|---|---|---|---|
| JP | Manohar Lal | 2,69,629 | 70.96 | |
| INC | Naresh Chandra Chaturvedi | 95,340 | 25.09 | |
| Independent | Bhagwati Prasad Dixit | 6,799 | 1.79 | |
| Independent | S. M. Banerjee | 5,035 | 1.33 | |
| Independent | Ram Chandra Sathi | 1,677 | 0.44 | |
| Majority | | 1,74,289 | 45.87 | |
| Turnout | | 3,83,842 | 58.37 | |
| JP gain from Independent | | Swing | | |

=== 1971 ===
1971 Indian general election: Kanpur
| Party | Candidate | Votes | % | ±% |
|---|---|---|---|---|
| Independent | S. M. Banerjee | 1,48,845 | 60.93 | |
| ABJS | Babu Ram Shukla | 59,646 | 24.42 | |
| Independent | Mohammad Waseem | 24,776 | 10.14 | |
| CPI(M) | Sheo Varma | 3,123 | 1.28 | |
| Independent | Lakhan Lal | 1,334 | 0.55 | |
| Majority | | 89,199 | 36.51 | |
| Turnout | | 2,44,289 | 48.27 | |
| Independent hold | | Swing | | |

=== 1967 ===
1967 Indian general election: Kanpur
| Party | Candidate | Votes | % | ±% |
|---|---|---|---|---|
| Independent | S. M. Banerjee | 77,882 | 32.34 | |
| INC | G. Dutt | 71,365 | 29.63 | |
| ABJS | Babu Ram Shukla | 46,899 | 19.47 | |
| Independent | M. Ali | 14,299 | 5.94 | |
| CPI(M) | Ram Asrey | 13,389 | 5.56 | |
| Majority | | 6,517 | 2.71 | |
| Turnout | | 2,40,823 | 51.83 | |
| Independent hold | | Swing | | |

=== 1962 ===
1962 Indian general election: Kanpur
| Party | Candidate | Votes | % | ±% |
|---|---|---|---|---|
| Independent | S. M. Banerjee | 1,39,039 | 53.21 | |
| INC | Bejoy Kumar Sinha | 80,934 | 30.97 | |
| ABJS | Babu Ram Shukla | 20,571 | 7.87 | |
| PSP | Vimal Mehrotra | 6,526 | 2.50 | |
| Independent | Moti Lal | 4,039 | 1.55 | |
| Majority | | 58,105 | 22.24 | |
| Turnout | | 2,71,823 | 56.05 | |
| Independent hold | | Swing | | |

=== 1957 ===
1957 Indian general election: Kanpur
| Party | Candidate | Votes | % | ±% |
|---|---|---|---|---|
| Independent | S. M. Banerjee | 87,612 | 49.49 | |
| INC | Surya Prasad Awasthi | 70,988 | 40.10 | |
| Majority | | 16,624 | 9.39 | |
| Turnout | | 1,77,016 | 42.28 | |
| Independent gain from PSP | | Swing | | |

=== 1952 By-election ===
By Election, 1952: Kanpur Central
| Party | Candidate | Votes | % | ±% |
|---|---|---|---|---|
| PSP | Prof. Raja Ram Shastri | 65,739 | 55.25 | |
| INC | Chail Behari Dixit Kantak | 51,951 | 43.67 | |
| Independent | Sita Ram | 1,284 | 1.08 | |
| Majority | | 13,788 | 11.58 | |
| Turnout | | 1,18,974 | 28.94 | |
| PSP gain from INC | | Swing | | |

=== 1952 By-election ===
By Election, 1952: Kanpur Central
| Party | Candidate | Votes | % | ±% |
|---|---|---|---|---|
| INC | Shiv Narayan Tandon | 60,087 | 42.93 | |
| PSP | Prof. Raja Ram Shastri | 45,300 | 32.36 | |
| CPI | Sant Singh Yusuf | 31,019 | 22.16 | |
| RRP | N. Upadhyay | 3,561 | 2.54 | |
| Majority | | 14,787 | 10.57 | |
| Turnout | | 1,39,967 | 35.07 | |
| INC hold | | Swing | | |

=== 1952 ===
1952 Indian general election: Kanpur Central
| Party | Candidate | Votes | % | ±% |
|---|---|---|---|---|
| INC | Harihar Nath Shastri | 88,812 | 64.91 | |
| Socialist Party (India) | Ramau Shanker Avasthi | 17,635 | 12.89 | |
| Independent | Chail Behari Dixit Kantak | 14,861 | 10.86 | |
| KMPP | Ganga Sahai Chaubey | 4,476 | 3.27 | |
| Independent | Barhma Nand Misra | 3,423 | 2.50 | |
| Independent | Ram Ji Das | 3,281 | 2.40 | |
| Independent | Sohan Lal Shenghavia | 3,079 | 2.25 | |
| Independent | Gajpat Rai | 1,253 | 0.92 | |
| Majority | | 71,177 | 52.02 | |
| Turnout | | 1,36,821 | 34.60 | |
| INC win (new seat) | | | | |

== See also ==
- Kanpur district
- List of constituencies of the Lok Sabha
- Kanpur (Mayoral Constituency)
- Kanpur (Division Graduates Constituency)
- Kanpur-Akbarpur Lok Sabha constituency
- Kanpur-Bilhaur Lok Sabha constituency
- Kanpur Dehat Lok Sabha constituency
- General Ganj Assembly constituency
