= Arif Mohammad Khan =

Former Governor of Bihar

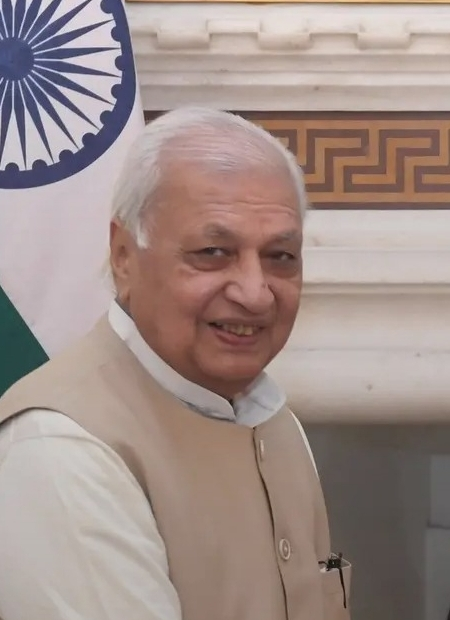
- Khan, c. 2024

42nd Governor of Bihar
- In office 2 January 2025 – 14 March 2026
- President: Droupadi Murmu
- Chief Minister: Nitish Kumar
- Preceded by: Rajendra Arlekar
- Succeeded by: Syed Ata Hasnain

27th Governor of Kerala
- In office 6 September 2019 – 2 January 2025
- President: Ram Nath Kovind (until 25 July 2022); Droupadi Murmu (from 25 July 2022)
- Chief Minister: Pinarayi Vijayan
- Preceded by: P. Sathasivam
- Succeeded by: Rajendra Arlekar

Union Minister of Civil Aviation
- In office 6 December 1989 – 10 November 1990
- President: Ramaswamy Venkataraman
- Prime Minister: V. P. Singh
- Preceded by: V. P. Singh
- Succeeded by: Harmohan Dhawan

Member of Parliament, Lok Sabha
- In office 12 January 1980 – 28 December 1984
- Preceded by: Manohar Lal
- Succeeded by: Naresh Chander Chaturvedi
- Constituency: Kanpur, Uttar Pradesh
- In office 29 December 1984 – 18 June 1991
- Preceded by: Maulana Saiyad Muzaffar Hussain
- Succeeded by: Rudrasen Chaudhary
- Constituency: Bahraich, Uttar Pradesh
- In office 10 March 1998 – 26 April 1999
- Preceded by: Padamsen Chaudhary
- Succeeded by: Padamsen Chaudhary
- Constituency: Bahraich, Uttar Pradesh

Personal details
- Born: 18 November 1951 (age 74) Bulandshahr, Uttar Pradesh, India
- Party: Bharatiya Janata Party
- Other political affiliations: Indian National Congress (political party); Janata Dal (political party); National Democratic Alliance (political alliance)
- Spouse: Reshma Arif (m. 1977)
- Children: 2

Arif Mohammad Khan (born 18 November 1951) is an Indian politician who previously served as the 42nd Governor of Bihar from 2025 to 2026. He belongs from the state of Uttar Pradesh and is a member of the Bharatiya Janata Party (BJP), and served as Governor of Kerala from 2019 to 2025, Governor of Bihar from 2025 to 2026, and as a Union minister, holding several portfolios like civil aviation.

== Early life and education ==
Arif Mohammad Khan was born on 18 November 1951 in Bulandshahr. He was educated at Jamia Millia School, Delhi, Aligarh Muslim University, Aligarh and at Shia College, University of Lucknow.

Ex-MLA Asif Muhammad Khan is his younger brother. Arif Mohammad Khan translated Vande Mataram into Urdu. It can be read in Urdu (Devanagari script)

== Political career (1972–2019; 2026- Present) ==
Khan started his political career as a student leader. He was the President of Aligarh Muslim University Students' Union in the year 1972–73 and also its honorary Secretary a year earlier (1971–72). He contested the first legislative assembly election from Siyana constituency of Bulandshahar on Bharatiya Kranti Dal party's banner but was defeated. He became a member of the legislative assembly of UP in 1977 at the age of 26.

Khan joined the Indian National Congress party and was elected to the Lok Sabha in 1980 from Kanpur and 1984 from Bahraich. In 1986, he quit the Indian National Congress due to differences over the passage of Muslim Personal Law Bill which was piloted by Rajiv Gandhi in the Lok Sabha. He was against the legislation to enable Muslim men to avoid giving their divorced wife or wives any maintenance after the iddah period as per the Quran and resigned because of differences with Rajiv Gandhi on this issue. Khan joined the Janata Dal and was re-elected to the Lok Sabha in 1989. During the Janata Dal rule Khan served as Union Minister of Ministry of Civil Aviation. He left the Janata Dal to join the Bahujan Samaj Party and again entered the Lok Sabha in 1998 from Bahraich. Khan held ministerial responsibilities from 1984 to 1990. In 2004, he joined the Bharatiya Janata Party (BJP) and unsuccessfully contested the Lok Sabha election that year from Kaiserganj constituency. Later BJP appointed Khan as the Governor of Kerala and later was appointed as the Governor of Bihar.

On 10 May 2026, he spoke about the Shah Bano Case.

== Jain Hawala Case ==
Journalist Sanjay Kapoor, in his book "Bad Money, Bad Politics" has claimed that Khan received an amount of 7 crores of Hawala money. As per the CBI charge sheet, he was accused of being paid this amount of money when he was Union Minister, but he was later acquitted in the case.

== Political views ==
=== Reformation in Islam ===
Arif Mohammad Khan has always supported reformation within Muslims. He resigned from position of Minister of state protesting against Rajiv Gandhi Congress Government stand on Shah Bano case in 1986. He defended Supreme Court judgement on Shah Bano case in Parliament. Khan opposed triple talaq in India and said that pronouncement of divorce by Muslim men in such manner should be punishable by 3 years in jail. Khan has asserted that Muslim men are still allowed to be polygamous and can also give a divorce easily by paying paltry sums.

Khan welcomed the Karnataka High Court's judgement upholding that the hijab is not an essential garment according to Islam during the 2022 Karnataka hijab row, stating that enforcing the wearing of a hijab is a conspiracy to push back Muslim females into the four walls of their homes and reduce their career prospects - he gave an example of imagining a female IPS officer who is responsible for controlling law and order in a district, who cannot do so wearing a hijab.

On being asked for a reaction about the murder of Kanhaiya Lal in Udaipur by reporters, Khan responded that madrasas teach that blasphemy should be punished by beheading and demanded that what is taught there should be examined.

== Current activities ==
Khan has been deeply involved in writing since his student days. He is the author of the best-selling book of the year 2010 Text and Context: Quran and Contemporary Challenges, published by Rupa & Co. Now Arif Mohammad Khan is actively involved in writing articles and columns related to Islam and Sufism. He has advocated abolishing of All India Muslim Personal Law Board. Arif Mohammad Khan also supported the Supreme Court of India's Mohd. Ahmed Khan v. Shah Bano Begum to make the right to maintenance of a divorced Muslim wife absolute.

== Governorship (2019– 2026) ==
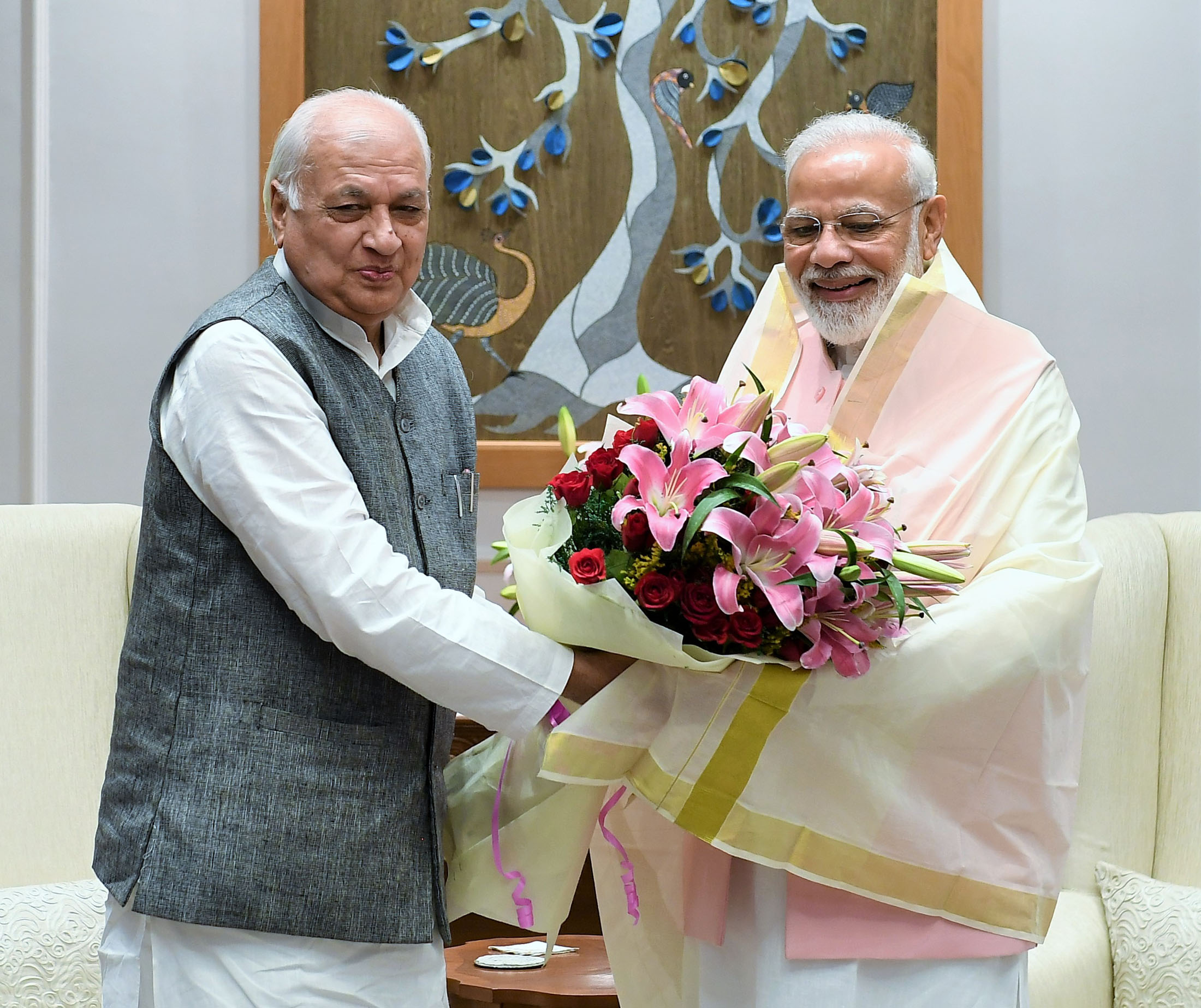
Arif Mohammad Khan meeting with Narendra Modi on 12 October 2019.jpg

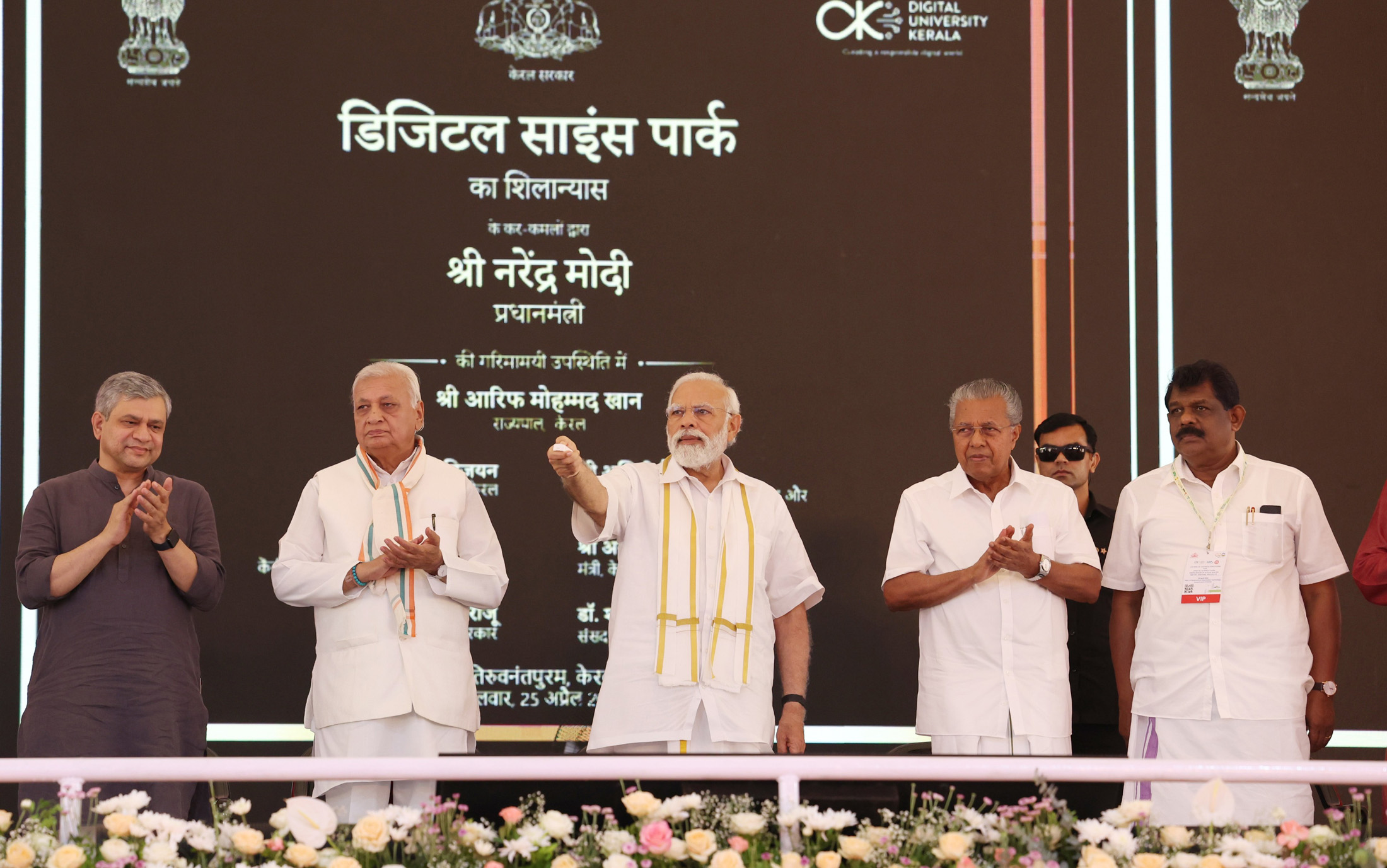
Arif Mohammad Khan during an inaugural function in Kerala on 25 April 2023.

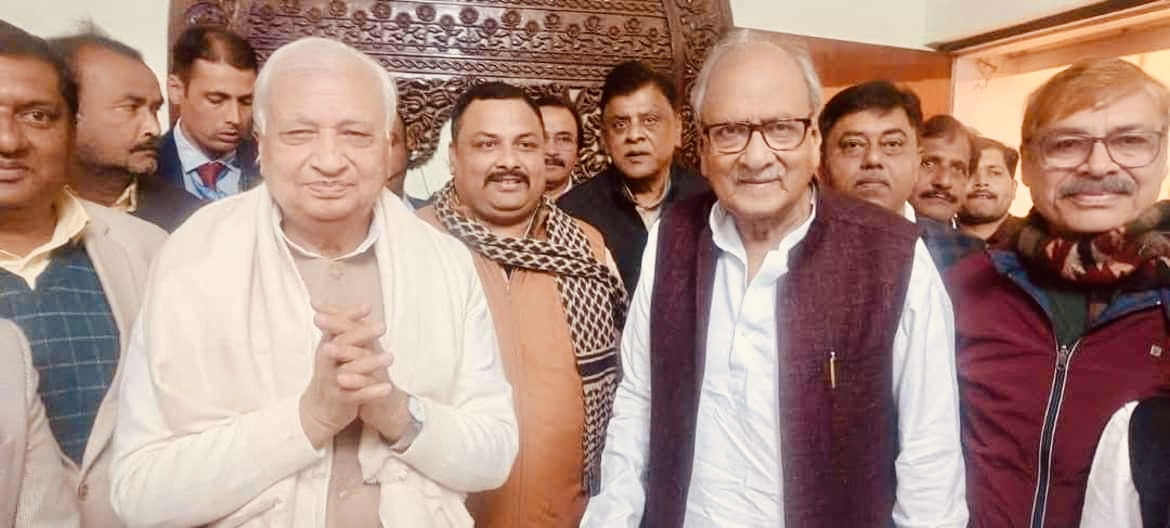
Arif Mohammad Khan with former Kerala governor Nikhil Kumar on 19 January 2025.

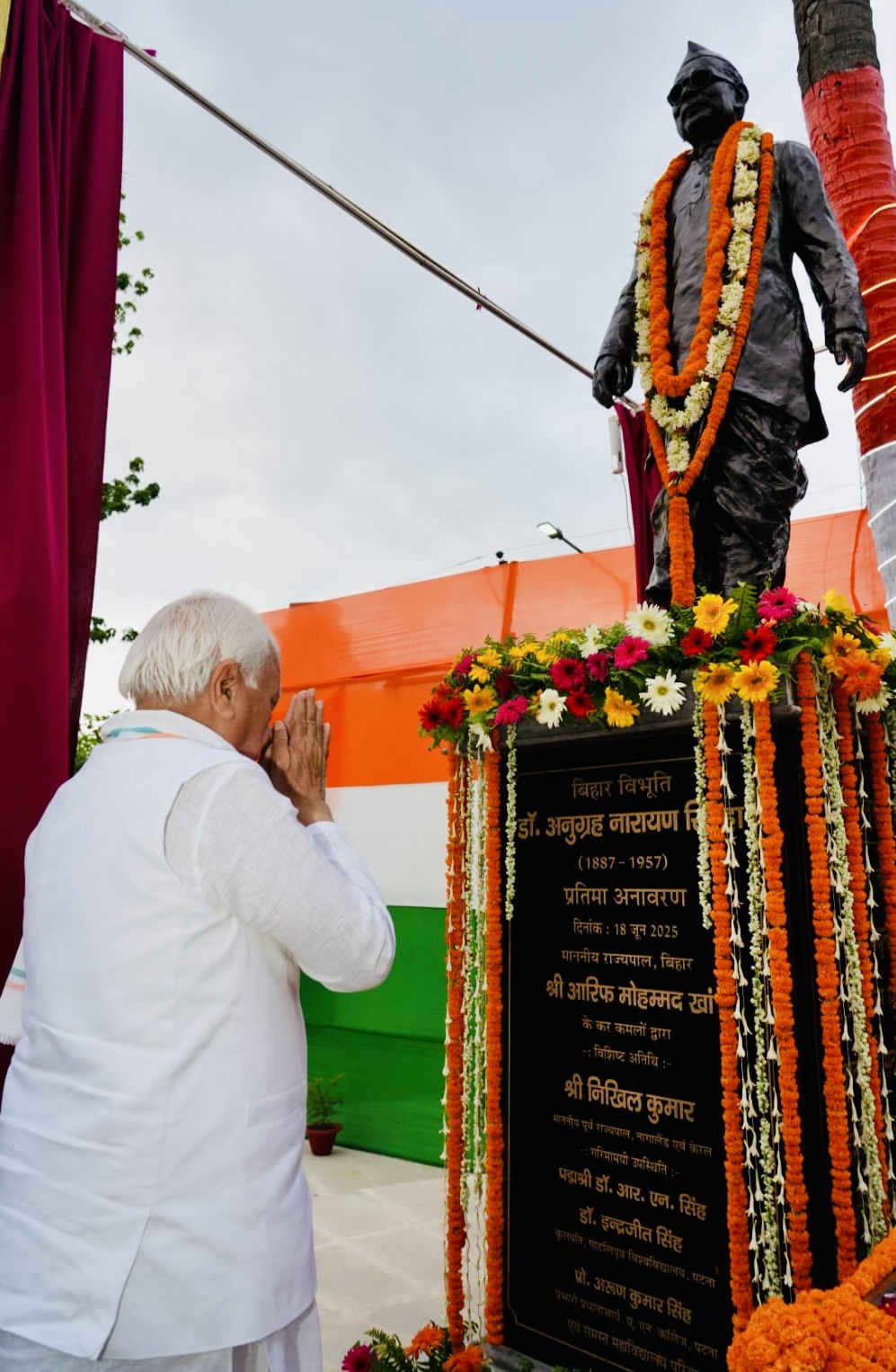
Arif Mohammad Khan inaugurating Bihar Vibhuti Dr Anugraha Statue in Bihar on 18 June 2025.

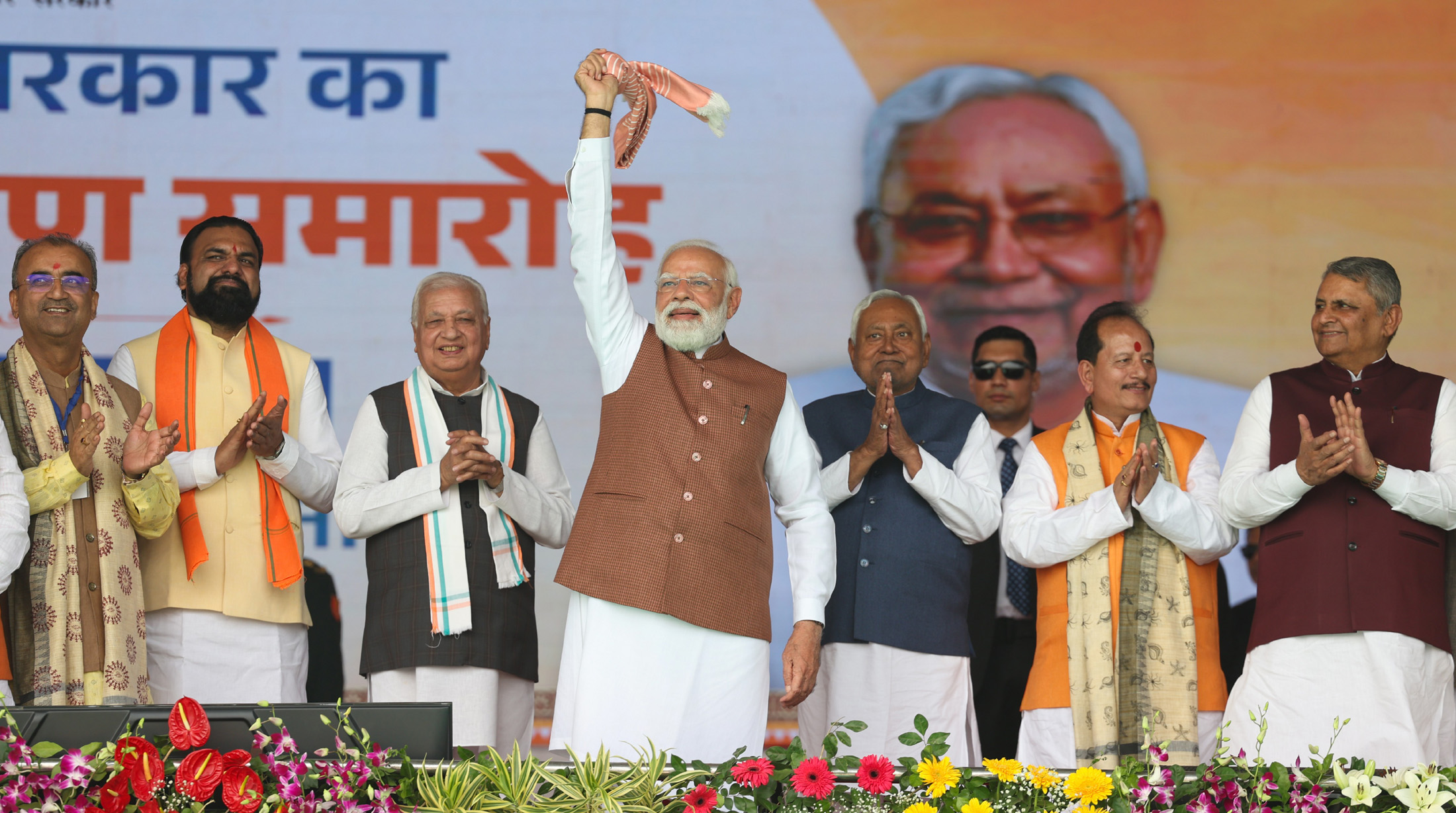
Arif Mohammad Khan during the swearing-in ceremony of the new government formed in Bihar on 20 November 2025.

=== Governor of Kerala (2019–2025) ===
Khan was appointed the Governor of Kerala on 1 September 2019 by the order of the President of India, Ram Nath Kovind. He took charge as Governor on 6 September 2019 from P. Sathasivam he continued in office till 2 January 2025. Then he was appointed as the Governor of Bihar. The political controversy regarding the appointment of vice-chancellors of backgrounds from SFI/CPIM to the universities of Kerala had put him in the spotlight. He wasn't given a proper farewell by the Kerala state government owing to various controversies between the office of the governor and the government. His farewell wasn't attended by the Chief Minister Pinarayi Vijayan nor any of the cabinet ministers.

=== Governor of Bihar (2025–2026) ===
Khan was appointed by the president as the Governor of Bihar on 24 December 2024, and assumed office on 2 January 2025. He left office on 14 March 2026 when he was replaced by Syed Ata Hasnain after just a period of 1 year & 71 days.

== See also ==
- Muslim Women (Protection of Rights on Divorce) Act 1986
- Mohd. Ahmed Khan v. Shah Bano Begum
- Mukhtar Abbas Naqvi
- Syed Zafar Islam
- Tahir Aslam Gora
- Tarek Fatah

Lok Sabha
Preceded by Manohar Lal	Member of Parliament for Kanpur; 1980 – 1984	Succeeded by Naresh Chander Chaturvedi
Preceded by Maulana Saiyad Muzaffar Hussain	Member of Parliament for Bahraich; 1984 – 1991	Succeeded by Rudrasen Chaudhary
Preceded by Padamsen Chaudhary	Member of Parliament for Bahraich; 1998 – 1999	Succeeded by Padamsen Chaudhary
Political offices
Preceded by P. Sathasivam	Governor of Kerala; 6 September 2019 – 2 January 2025	Succeeded by Rajendra Arlekar
Political offices
Preceded by Rajendra Arlekar	Governor of Bihar; 2 January 2025 – 13 March 2026	Succeeded by Syed Ata Hasnain
