= Subhashini Ali =

Indian politician

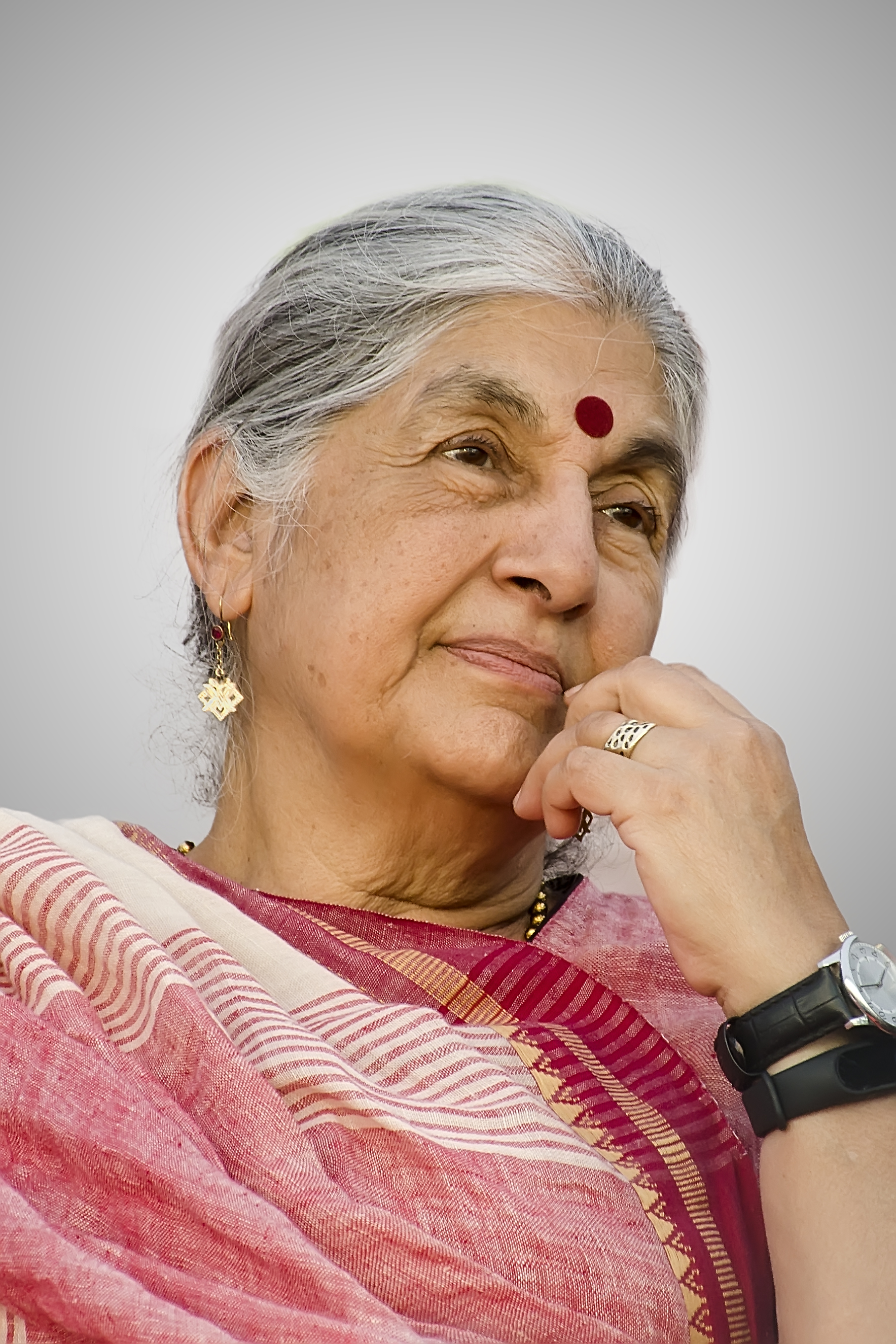
- Subhashini Ali in 2019

Member of Parliament, Lok Sabha
- In office 1989–1991
- Constituency: Kanpur
- Preceded by: Naresh Chandra Chaturvedi
- Succeeded by: Jagat Vir Singh Drona

President, All India Democratic Women's Association
- Succeeded by: Jagmati Sangwan

Member of Polit Bureau, Communist Party of India (Marxist)
- Incumbent
- Assumed office 2015

Personal details
- Born: Subhashini Sehgal; 29 December 1947 (age 78) Kanpur, United Provinces, India
- Party: Communist Party of India (Marxist)
- Spouse: Muzaffar Ali (separated)
- Relations: Swaminathan family
- Children: Shaad Ali
- Parents: Prem Sahgal (father); Lakshmi Sahgal (mother)
- Education: Women's Christian College, Kanpur University
- As of 27 January, 2007

Subhasini Ali (née Sehgal; born 29 December 1947) is an Indian Marxist politician. She is a Polit Buro Member of the Communist Party of India (Marxist). She is also the former President of the All India Democratic Women's Association and former Member of Parliament from Kanpur, in Uttar Pradesh.

== Early life and education ==
Subhashini Ali is the daughter of Colonel Prem Sahgal and Captain Lakshmi Sahgal (née Dr. Lakshmi Swaminadhan) who were a part of the Indian National Army. She attended Welham Girls' School in Dehradun. She did her bachelor's degree from Women's Christian College in Madras and later did her master's degree from the Kanpur University.

== Career ==
=== Politics ===
As a trade Unionist and leader of the All India Democratic Women's Association, she was once very influential in the politics of Kanpur where the Communist Party of India (CPI) held sway over trade unions and which elected CPI-supported S.M. Banerjee to Lok Sabha four times from 1957 to 1971. This influence of CPI helped her win the General elections of 1989 to the parliament and she defeated her nearest rival BJP candidate by 56,587 votes from Kanpur. The CPI influence waned after the emergency in 1977 and she lost the General elections of 1996 by 151,090 votes. She finished at the fifth place in the General elections of 2004 polling only 4558 votes (0.74%). She fought the General elections of 2014 from Barrackpore as a CPI(M) candidate but lost.

She is currently a member of the Central Committee of the Communist Party of India (Marxist). She was inducted to the polit bureau (PB) of Communist Party of India (Marxist) in 2015 thereby becoming the second women member in PB after Brinda Karat.

Ali published her translation of The Communist Manifesto by Karl Marx and Friedrich Engels into Hindi in 2019.

=== Films ===
Subhashini Ali designed period costumes for the 1981 film Umrao Jaan, directed by her then-husband Muzaffar Ali. She also dabbles in amateur acting, and her first starring role was in Asoka in 2001, followed by an English feature, The Guru, in 2002, and was seen again in 2005, with her fellow party member, Brinda Karat in the film Amu.

She inspired the film Anjuman (1986) directed by Muzaffar Ali.

== Personal life ==
She was previously married to filmmaker Muzaffar Ali. Their son, Shaad Ali, is also a filmmaker who is known for directing many popular films.

Ali is an atheist. She is the cousin of Indian classical dancer Mallika Sarabhai, daughter of her mother's sister Mrinalini Sarabhai and scientist Vikram Sarabhai.

== See also ==
- Swaminathan family
