= Arun Pathak (Uttar Pradesh politician) =

Indian politician, social activist and teacher

Member of Uttar Pradesh Legislative Council
- Incumbent
- Assumed office 2015
- Preceded by: Jagendra Swarup
- Constituency: Kanpur

Personal details
- Born: April 14, 1973 (age 52) Kanpur, Uttar Pradesh
- Party: Bharatiya Janata Party
- Occupation: Politician & Teacher

Arun Pathak (born 14 April 1973) is an Indian politician, serving as a Member of Uttar Pradesh Legislative Council from Kanpur Division Graduates Constituency as a member of BJP.

== Early life ==
He was born and raised in Kanpur.He also studied and worked as a chemistry teacher at BNSD Inter College in Kanpur.

== Political career ==
In 2015 he was elected as Member of Legislative Council in a by-election from Kanpur Division Graduates Constituency as the BJP candidate.

He defeated a member of the Swarup family of Kanpur; successive members of that family had previously held the seat since 1916.
