= Sishamau Assembly constituency =

Constituency of the Uttar Pradesh legislative assembly in India

Sishamau
- Constituency No. 213 for the Uttar Pradesh Legislative Assembly

Constituency details
- Country: India
- Region: North India
- State: Uttar Pradesh
- District: Kanpur Nagar
- Total electors: 2,71,539 (2024)
- Reservation: None

Member of Legislative Assembly
- 18th Uttar Pradesh Legislative Assembly
- Incumbent Naseem Solanki
- Party: Samajwadi Party

Sishamau Assembly constituency Sīsāmaū Vidhānasabhā Nirvācana Kṣētra) is one of 403 legislative assembly seats of the Uttar Pradesh. It comes under Kanpur Lok Sabha constituency.

== Overview ==
Sishamau (earlier Scesambow) comprises Wards No. 2, 4, 10, 13, 15, 16, 18, 28, 34, 39, 43, 46, 49, 51, 57, 63, 64, 79, 88, 95, 98, and 110 in Kanpur Municipal Corporation of 2-Kanpur Sadar Tehsil.

== Members of Legislative Assembly ==
Year	Member	Party
1974	Sheo Lal	Indian National Congress
1977	Moti Ram	Janata Party
1980	Kamla Dariyabadi	Indian National Congress (I)
1985	Kamla Dariyabadi	Indian National Congress
1989	Shiv Kumar Beria	Janata Dal
1991	Rakesh Sonkar	Bharatiya Janata Party
1993	Rakesh Sonkar	Bharatiya Janata Party
1996	Rakesh Sonkar	Bharatiya Janata Party
2002	Sanjeev Dariyabadi	Indian National Congress
2007	Sanjeev Dariyabadi	Indian National Congress
2012	Irfan Solanki	Samajwadi Party
2017	Irfan Solanki	Samajwadi Party
2022	Irfan Solanki	Samajwadi Party
2024^	Naseem Solanki	Samajwadi Party

^ denotes bypoll

== Election results ==
=== 2027 ===
2027 Uttar Pradesh Legislative Assembly election: Sishamau
Party	Candidate	Votes	%	±%
INDIA				
NDA				
BSP				
NOTA	None of the above			
Majority				
Turnout				
gain from		Swing		

=== 2024 bypoll ===
Uttar Pradesh Legislative Assembly by-election, 2024: Sishamau
Party	Candidate	Votes	%	±%
SP	Naseem Solanki	69,714	52.36	
BJP	Suresh Awasthi	61,150	45.93	
BSP	Virendra Kumar	1,410	1.06	
NOTA	None of the Above	483	0.36	
Majority		8,564	6.43	
Turnout		1,33,137	49.06	
SP hold		Swing		

=== 2022 ===
U. P. Assembly Election, 2022: Sishamau
Party	Candidate	Votes	%	±%
SP	Haji Irfan Solanki	79,163	50.68	+3.33
BJP	Salil Vishnoi	66,897	42.83	−0.75
INC	Haji Sohel Ahmed	5,616	3.6	
BSP	Rajnish Tiwari	2,937	1.88	−5.87
NOTA	None of the above	664	0.43	−0.09
Majority		12,266	7.85	+4.08
Turnout		156,209	56.83	+0.19
SP hold		Swing	+3.33	

=== 2017 ===
U. P. Assembly Election, 2017: Sishamau
Party	Candidate	Votes	%	±%
SP	Haji Irfan Solanki	73,030	47.35	
BJP	Suresh Awasthi	67,204	43.58	
BSP	Nand Lal Kori	11,949	7.75	
NOTA	None of the above	791	0.52	
Majority		5,826	3.77	
Turnout		154,222	56.64	
SP hold		Swing		

=== 2012 ===
Uttar Pradesh Assembly Election, 2012: Sishamau
Party	Candidate	Votes	%	±%
SP	Haji Irfan Solanki	56,496	42.17	
BJP	Hanuman Swarup Mishra	36,833	27.50	
INC	Sanjeev Dariyabadi	22,024	16.44	
BSP	Mohammad Waseeq	15,846	11.83	
Independent	Prem Chandra	560	0.42	
Majority		19,663	14.67	
Turnout		1,33,957	51.95	
SP gain from INC		Swing		

=== 2007 ===
Uttar Pradesh Assembly Elections, 2007: Sishamau
Party	Candidate	Votes	%	±%
INC	Sanjeev Dariyabadi	25,775	33.79	
BJP	Rakesh Sonkar	24,411	32.00	
BSP	Anil Sonkar Warsi	13,986	18.33	
SP	Chandra Pal Diwakar	10,250	13.43	
Independent	Sushil	649	0.85	
Majority		1,364	1.79	
Turnout		76,279	34.73	
INC hold		Swing		

=== 2002 ===
Uttar Pradesh assembly elections, 2002: Sishamau
Party	Candidate	Votes	%	±%
INC	Sanjeev Daryabadi	29,482	37.91	
BJP	Kapoor Chandra Sonker	23,933	30.77	
SP	Durgesh Balmiki	16,878	21.70	
BSP	Shital Charan	5,493	7.06	
Independent	Hem Nath	550	0.71	
Majority		5,549	7.14	
Turnout		77,770	36.75	
INC gain from BJP		Swing		

=== 1996 ===
Uttar Pradesh assembly elections, 1996: Sishamau
Party	Candidate	Votes	%	±%
BJP	Rakesh Sonker	43,201	47.33	
CPI(M)	Daulat Ram	26,101	28.60	
INC	Kamla Daryabadi	20,996	23.00	
ABHM	Ram Swaroop	326	0.36	
BSP(R)	Manoj Kumar Gautam	278	0.30	
Majority		17,100	18.73	
Turnout		91,270	44.78	
BJP hold		Swing		

=== 1993 ===
U. P. Assembly Election, 1993: Sishamau
Party	Candidate	Votes	%	±%
BJP	Rakesh Sonkar	51,949	52.60	
SP	Sanjai Sonkar	21,975	22.25	
CPI(M)	Daulat Ram	11,415	11.56	
INC	Ashok Dhanvik	10,426	10.56	
BKD	Pankaj Kumar Rawat	814	0.82	
Majority		29,974	30.35	
Turnout		98,759	52.70	
BJP hold		Swing		

=== 1991 ===
U. P. Assembly Election, 1991: Sishamau
Party	Candidate	Votes	%	±%
BJP	Rakesh Sonkar	36,576	50.47	
INC	Deen Dayal	14,820	20.45	
JP	Tulsi Ram	8,191	11.30	
CPI(M)	Daulat Ram	8,033	11.08	
BSP	Sunder Lal Balmiki	3,221	4.44	
Majority		21,756	30.02	
Turnout		72,473	39.55	
BJP hold		Swing		

=== 1989 ===
U. P. Assembly Election, 1989: Sishamau
Party	Candidate	Votes	%	±%
JD	Shiv Kumar Beria	29,983	37.59	
INC	Kamla Dariyabadi	22,768	28.54	
BJP	Panna Lal Tambe	18,854	23.64	
BSP	Rita Devi	6,073	7.61	
IND.	M. Lal	1,328	1.66	
Majority		7,215	9.05	
Turnout		79,770	43.88	
JD gain from INC		Swing		

=== 1985 ===
U. P. Assembly Election, 1985: Sishamau
Party	Candidate	Votes	%	±%
INC	Kamla Dariyabadi	25,953	50.61	
CPI(M)	Daulat Ram	16,251	31.69	
BJP	Chhavi Lal	5,186	10.11	
JP	Moti Ram	2,395	4.67	
Independent	Bhola Nath	501	0.98	
Majority		9,702	18.92	
Turnout		51,285	33.88	
INC hold		Swing		

== See also ==
- List of Vidhan Sabha constituencies of Uttar Pradesh
