= Arya Nagar Assembly constituency =

Constituency of the Uttar Pradesh legislative assembly in India

Arya Nagar
- Constituency No. 214 for the Uttar Pradesh Legislative Assembly

Constituency details
- Country: India
- Region: North India
- State: Uttar Pradesh
- District: Kanpur Nagar
- Total electors: 3,05,433 (2024)
- Reservation: None

Member of Legislative Assembly
- 18th Uttar Pradesh Legislative Assembly
- Incumbent Amitabh Bajpai
- Party: Samajwadi Party
- Elected year: 2022
- Preceded by: Salil Vishnoi

Arya Nagar Assembly constituency is one of 403 legislative assembly seats of the Uttar Pradesh. It is part of the Kanpur Lok Sabha constituency.

== Overview ==
Arya Nagar comprises Wards No. 1, 26, 29, 52, 54, 55, 62, 69, 72, 76, 78, 89, 91, 94, 99, 102, 105, 106, 108, 110 in Kanpur Municipal Corporation, Central Railway Colony (OG) – Ward No. 111 & Rawatpur Station Yard (OG) – Ward No. 112 of 2-Kanpur Sadar Tehsil.

== Members of Legislative Assembly ==
Year	Member	Party
1969	Shiv Lal	Indian National Congress
1974	Abdul Rahman Khan Nashtar	Indian National Congress
1977	Babu Badre	Janata Party
1980	Abdul Rahman Khan Nashtar	Indian National Congress (Indira)
1985	Hafiz Mohammad Umar	Indian National Congress
1989	Reshma Arif	Janata Dal
1991	Satya Dev Pachauri	Bharatiya Janata Party
1993	Mahesh Chandra	Bahujan Samaj Party
1996	Haji Mushtaq Solanki	Samajwadi Party
2002	Haji Mushtaq Solanki	Samajwadi Party
2007	Irfan Solanki	Samajwadi Party
2012	Salil Vishnoi	Bharatiya Janata Party
2017	Amitabh Bajpai	Samajwadi Party
2022	Amitabh Bajpai	Samajwadi Party

== Election results ==
=== 2027 ===
2027 Uttar Pradesh Legislative Assembly election: Arya Nagar
Party	Candidate	Votes	%	±%
INDIA				
NDA				
BSP				
NOTA	None of the above			
Majority				
Turnout				
gain from		Swing		

=== 2022 ===
2022 Uttar Pradesh Legislative Assembly election: Arya Nagar
Party	Candidate	Votes	%	±%
SP	Amitabh Bajpai	76,897	50.56	+2.42
BJP	Suresh Awasthi	68,973	45.35	+1.09
INC	Pramod Jaiswal	3,309	2.18	+1.1
BSP	Toni Jaiswal	1,387	0.91	−3.2
NOTA	None of the above	547	0.36	−0.1
Majority		7,924	5.21	+1.33
Turnout		152,099	50.95	−1.89
SP hold		Swing	+2.42	

=== 2017 ===
2017 Uttar Pradesh Legislative Assembly election: Arya Nagar
Party	Candidate	Votes	%	±%
SP	Amitabh Bajpai	70,993	48.14	
BJP	Salil Vishnoi	65,270	44.26	
BSP	Abdul Haseeb	6,061	4.11	
INC	Pramod Jaiswal	1,596	1.08	
AIMIM	Haji Rabiullah	1,557	1.06	
NOTA	None of the above	681	0.46	
Majority		5,723	3.88	
Turnout		147,465	52.84	
SP gain from BJP		Swing		

=== 2012 ===
U. P. Legislative Assembly Election, 2012: Arya Nagar
Party	Candidate	Votes	%	±%
BJP	Salil Vishnoi	51,200	40.73	+21.73
SP	Jitendra Bahadur Singh	35,789	28.47	−24.00
INC	Dr. Anil Kumar Sharma	19,345	15.39	+1.49
BSP	Kailash Sharma	12,797	10.18	−1.05
PECP	Mohammad Israr	1,528	1.22	+1.22
Majority		15,411	12.26	−21.21
Turnout		1,25,695	49.78	+9.39
BJP gain from SP		Swing	+21.73	

=== 2007 ===
U. P. Legislative Assembly Election, 2007: Arya Nagar
Party	Candidate	Votes	%	±%
SP	Haji Irfan Solanki	36,376	52.47	
BJP	Harish Matreja	13,173	19.00	
INC	Pawan Gupta	9,636	13.90	
BSP	Sunil Babu	7,788	11.23	
BPD	Omendra Pratap Singh	1,227	1.77	
Majority		23,203	33.47	
Turnout		69,326	40.39	
SP hold		Swing		

=== 2002 ===
U. P. Legislative Assembly Election, 2002: Arya Nagar
Party	Candidate	Votes	%	±%
SP	Haji Mushtaq Solanki	46,448	54.09	
BJP	Anant Kumar (Antu Mishra)	19,132	22.28	
INC	Bhudhar Narayan Mishra	12,920	15.04	
BSP	Rajneesh Tiwari	4,490	5.23	
Independent	Pauva Kinner	2,034	2.37	
Majority		27,316	32.81	
Turnout		85,878	43.25	
SP hold		Swing		

=== 1996 ===
U. P. Legislative Assembly Election, 1996: Arya Nagar
Party	Candidate	Votes	%	±%
SP	Haji Mushtaq Solanki	39,531	40.84	
BJP	Satya Dev Pachauri	36,969	38.19	
BSP	Jiya Ul Islam	17,036	17.60	
Independent	Adil Ashraf	1,819	1.88	
Natural Law	Aushaf Hussain	262	0.27	
Majority		2,562	2.65	
Turnout		96,801	50.70	
SP gain from BSP		Swing		

=== 1993 ===
Uttar Pradesh Assembly Election, 1993: Arya Nagar
Party	Candidate	Votes	%	±%
BSP	Mahesh Chandra	45,981	47.28	
BJP	Satya Dev Pachauri	40,913	42.07	
INC	Hafiz Mohammad Umar	7,300	7.51	
JD	Mohammad Amin	650	0.67	
CPI	Arvind Raj Swaroop	564	0.58	
Majority		5,068	7.21	
Turnout		97,257	57.51	
BSP gain from BJP		Swing		

=== 1991 ===
Uttar Pradesh Assembly Election, 1991: Arya Nagar
Party	Candidate	Votes	%	±%
BJP	Satya Dev Pachauri	29,964	43.34	
IUML	Mohammad Suleman	19,859	28.72	
INC	S. M. Usman	8,222	11.89	
BSP	Ramesh Chandra Kureel	5,315	7.69	
JD	Saiyad Abul Barkat Nazmi	3,306	4.78	
Majority		10,105	14.62	
Turnout		69,135	43.09	
BJP gain from JD		Swing		

=== 1989 ===
U. P. Assembly Election, 1989: Arya Nagar
Party	Candidate	Votes	%	±%
JD	Reshma Arif	14,250	20.70	
IUML	Mohammad Suleman	13,811	20.06	
BJP	Ganesh Awasthi	12,877	18.71	
INC	Hafiz Mohammad Umar	12,354	17.95	
IND.	Pawan Dixit	7,018	10.19	
BSP	Om Prakash	5,806	8.43	
Majority		439	0.64	
Turnout		68,878	43.78	
JD gain from INC		Swing		

=== 1985 ===
U. P. Assembly Election, 1985: Arya Nagar
Party	Candidate	Votes	%	±%
INC	Hafiz Mohammad Umar	19,918	45.00	
BJP	Surendra Nath	12,056	27.24	
Independent	Akhtar Hussain Akhtar	6,432	14.53	
CPI	Harbans Singh	1,826	4.13	
Independent	Suleman	1,334	3.01	
Majority		7,862	17.76	
Turnout		44,258	32.73	
INC hold		Swing		

== See also ==
- List of Vidhan Sabha constituencies of Uttar Pradesh
