= Harihar Nath Shastri =

Indian politician

Harihar Nath Shastri हरि हर नाथ शास्त्री

Member of Parliament, Lok Sabha
- In office 1952–1953
- Succeeded by: S. N. Tandon
- Constituency: Kanpur Central

Member of Legislative Assembly, Uttar Pradesh
- In office 1936–1939
- In office 1946–1947

President, All India Trade Union Congress
- In office 1933–1935

Personal details
- Born: 1905 Ballia (Uttar Pradesh)
- Party: Indian National Congress
- Education: Graduate from BHU

Harihar Nath Shastri was an Indian politician and a member of the Indian National Congress. He was the first Member of Parliament for Kanpur and also actively worked as a labour leader. In the late 1920s, he was viewed as a communist but was considered moderate by the late 1930s. He became the first president of the Indian National Railway Workers Federation (INRWF) in 1948. In 1925, he was recruited as a life member of the Servants of the People Society, by its founder-director, the late Lala Lajpat Rai, with whom he worked for a year as his private secretary. In 1947, he became a member of the Constituent Assembly of India, and upon its dissolution, became a member of the Indian Parliament, the Lok Sabha, from Kanpur.
