= Kanpur Graduates constituency =

Legislative Council seat in Uttar Pradesh

Kanpur Graduates Constituency is one of 100 Legislative Council seats in Uttar Pradesh, India. This constituency covers Kanpur Nagar, Kanpur Dehat and Unnao district.

== Members of the Legislative Council ==
Year	Name	Party
1916	Rai Bahadur Anand Swarup	Independent
1922	Rai Bahadur Anand Swarup	Independent
1928	Rai Bahadur Anand Swarup	Independent
1932	Rai Bahadur Dr. Brijendra Swarup	Independent
1938	Rai Bahadur Dr. Brijendra Swarup	Independent
1944	Rai Bahadur Dr. Brijendra Swarup	Independent
1950	Rai Bahadur Dr. Brijendra Swarup	Independent
1956	Dr. Virendra Swarup	Independent
1962	Dr. Virendra Swarup	Independent
1968	Dr. Virendra Swarup	Independent
1974	Dr. Virendra Swarup	Independent
1980	Jagendra Swarup	Independent
1986	Jagendra Swarup	Independent
1992	Jagendra Swarup	Independent
1998	Jagendra Swarup	Independent
2004	Jagendra Swarup	Independent
2010	Jagendra Swarup	Independent
2015*	Arun Pathak	Bharatiya Janata Party
2017	Arun Pathak	Bharatiya Janata Party
2023	Arun Pathak	Bharatiya Janata Party

- *By Election in January 2015.

== Election results ==
=== 2023 ===
U. P. Legislative Council Election, 2023: Kanpur
Party	Candidate	Votes	%	±%
BJP	Arun Pathak	62,601	81.72	▲26.48
SP	Kamlesh Yadav	9,316	12.16	New entry
INC	Neha Singh Sachan	2,380	3.11	New entry
Independent	Praveen Kumar Srivastava	311	0.41	▲0.26
NOTA	None of the Above	N/A	N/A	▼0.07
Majority		53,285	69.56	▲57.12
Turnout		76,608	40.93	▼13.67
BJP hold		Swing	▲26.48	

=== 2017 ===
U. P. Legislative Council Election, 2017: Kanpur
Party	Candidate	Votes	%	±%
BJP	Arun Pathak	40,633	55.24	▲18.32
Independent	Manvendra Swarup	31,479	42.80	▲8.55
NOTA	None of the Above	53	0.07	▼0.03
Majority		9,154	12.44	▲9.77
Turnout		73,551	54.60	▲24.16
BJP hold		Swing	▲18.32	

=== 2015 ===
U.P. Legislative Council By Election, 2015: Kanpur
Party	Candidate	Votes	%	±%
BJP	Arun Pathak	25,133	36.92	
Independent	Manvendra Swarup	23,317	34.25	
Independent	Dr. Vivek Dwivedi	10,242	15.04	
Independent	Dr. Awdhesh Pratap Singh	4,933	7.24	
Independent	Gyanendra Shukla	1,045	1.53	
NOTA	None of the Above	73	0.10	
Majority		1,816	2.67	
Turnout		68,063	30.44	
BJP gain from Independent		Swing		

== See also ==
- Kanpur (Teachers constituency)
- Kanpur Cantonment (Assembly constituency)
- Kanpur (Lok Sabha constituency)
