= Lok Paritran =

- Abbreviation: LKPT
- Leader: Shri Chandrashekhar Rajpurohit
- Founded: 2006
- Ideology: Honest Politics

Paritrana, meaning "to bring relief from the cause of distress" in Sanskrit, is the former name of an Indian political party later renamed to Lok Paritran. The party was formed in February 2006 by a group of six graduates from IIT Bombay and IIT Kanpur. It plans to contest in the next assembly elections and then stand for parliament. The founders of the political party are graduates of Indian Institutes of Technology (who chose to give up careers in their fields of study and follow their inner voice which told them that 'they should invest their efforts in the country rather than making their pockets heavier'. The entire core team including all the party members is Chandrashekhar (president), B.Tech, computer science (IIT Kanpur).

This party contested in 2006 Tamil Nadu elections in 7 constituencies headed by Tamil Nadu State President Mr. Elanthirumaran Periasamy, and secured 37325 votes which is ahead of total votes secured by DMDK and BJP in the 7 constituencies.

It is worth to mention that Mr Elanthirumaran Periasamy contested from Chepauk constituency where the ex CM and DMK President Dr. M. Karunanidhi contested. He secured 669 votes.

Ishrayel Maheshwar who contested against Mr. MK Stalin from Thousand Lights constituency got 2459 votes.

Mr Rajamany Kesavan got 11665 votes and secured third position from Anna Nagar constituency. Mr Santhanagopalan Vasudevan got 9436 votes and also secured third position from Mylapore constituency.

It was reported that the party was split. One faction formed another party called Bharat Punarnirman Dal.
