= Ramesh Awasthi =

Indian politician

Member of Parliament, Lok Sabha
- Incumbent
- Assumed office 4 June 2024
- Preceded by: Satyadev Pachauri
- Constituency: Kanpur

Personal details
- Born: 1 December 1967 (age 58) Farrukhabad, Uttar Pradesh, India
- Party: Bharatiya Janata Party
- Children: 3
- Parents: Rajendra Prasad (father); Brahma Devi (mother)
- Education: Vinayaka Mission's Research Foundation
- Occupation: Politician

Ramesh Awasthi is an Indian politician and the Elected candidate for Lok Sabha from Kanpur Lok Sabha constituency. He is a member of the Bharatiya Janata Party.. He organises the biggest mango festival in India. The NMC India Mango Festival is an annual celebration dedicated to the king of fruits, Mango.

== See also ==
- 18th Lok Sabha
