= List of mayors of Kanpur =

Kanpur Mayoral Constituency is one of the seventee mayoral constituencies of Uttar Pradesh, India.

== Total Number of Voters ==
Election	Polling Stations	Male Voters	Female Voters	Total Voters
2017	554	11,43,138	9,91,934	21,35,072

== List of Mayors ==
Year	Member	Political Party
1995	Sarla Singh	Bharatiya Janata Party
2000	Anil Kumar Sharma	Indian National Congress
2006	Ravindra Patni	Bharatiya Janata Party
2012	Jagat Vir Singh Drona	Bharatiya Janata Party
2017	Pramila Pandey	Bharatiya Janata Party
2023	Pramila Pandey	Bharatiya Janata Party

== Election results ==
=== 2023 ===
Uttar Pradesh Civic Body Election, 2023: Kanpur
Party	Candidate	Votes	%	±%
BJP	Pramila Pandey	440,353	48.03	+5.93
SP	Vandana Bajpai	2,62,507	28.63	+15.57
INC	Ashni Awasthi	90,480	9.87	−21.07
BSP	Archana Nishad	52,143	5.69	−3.02
IND	Vandana Bajpai	25,397	2.77	New
AIMIM	Shahana Parveen	16,372	1.79	New
AAP	Isma Zaheer	9,839	1.07	+0.08
NOTA	None of the Above	4,863	0.53	−0.21
Majority		1,77,846	19.40	+8.24
Turnout		9,16,735	41.34	−2.8
BJP hold		Swing		

=== 2017 ===
Uttar Pradesh Civic Body Election, 2017: Kanpur
Party	Candidate	Votes	%	±%
BJP	Pramila Pandey	396,725	42.10	
INC	Bandana Misra	2,91,591	30.94	
SP	Maya Gupta	1,23,074	13.06	
BSP	Archana Nishad	82,107	8.71	
AAP	Meena Singh	9,297	0.99	
SS	Suman Mishra	7,389	0.78	
RLD	Shamim Bano	5,185	0.55	
IND.	Janki Gupta	4,547	0.48	
NOTA	None of the Above	6,937	0.74	
Majority		1,05,134	11.16	
Turnout		9,42,389	44.14	
BJP hold		Swing		

=== 2012 ===
Uttar Pradesh Civic Body Election, 2012: Kanpur
Party	Candidate	Votes	%	±%
BJP	Jagat Vir Singh Drona	293,634	39.62	
INC	Pawan Kumar Gupta	2,40,311	32.43	
Majority		53,323	7.19	
Turnout		7,41,086	36.40	
BJP hold		Swing		

=== 2006 ===
Uttar Pradesh Civic Body Election, 2006: Kanpur
Party	Candidate	Votes	%	±%
BJP	Ravindra Patni	260,148	32.63	
INC	Badri Narayan Tiwari	2,13,658	26.80	
IND.	Saleem Ahmed	1,88,328	21.23	
SP	Neeraj Chaturvedi	1,25,429	15.73	
IND.	Chandra Shekhar	10,537	1.32	
RSMP	Vimal Singh	8,263	1.04	
Majority		46,490	5.83	
Turnout		7,97,158	48.19	
BJP gain from INC		Swing		

== See also ==
- Kanpur
- Pramila Pandey
- Kanpur Municipal Corporation
- Lucknow Municipal Corporation
- Agra Municipal Corporation
