= Jagendra Swarup =

Indian politician (1949–2014)

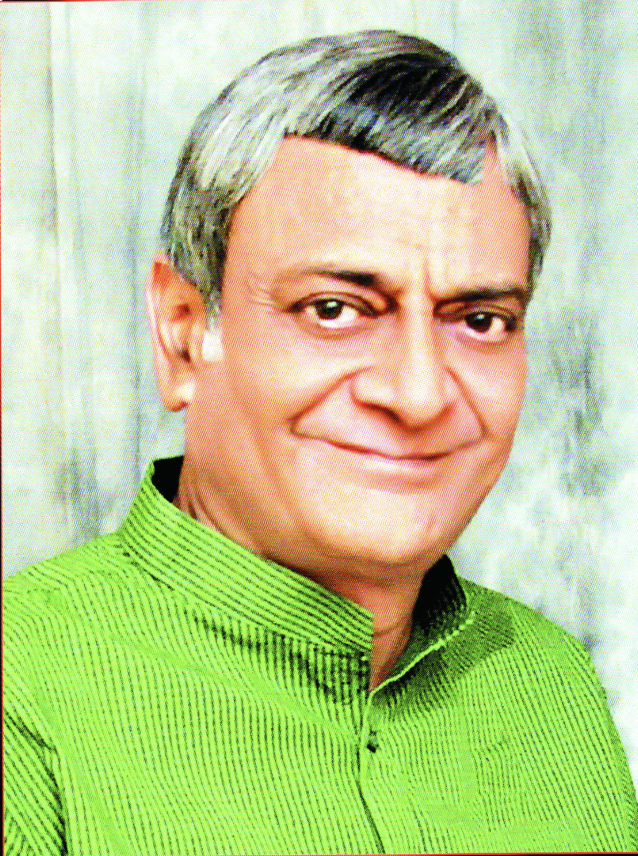

Member of Legislative Council
- In office 1980–2014
- Preceded by: Dr. Virendra Swarup
- Constituency: Kanpur Graduates constituency

Personal details
- Born: 2 July 1949 Kanpur, Uttar Pradesh
- Died: 30 July 2014 (aged 65) New Delhi
- Party: Independent
- Spouse: Sandhya Swarup
- Children: 2
- Parent(s): Dr. Virendra Swarup, Dhara Rani Swarup
- Education: St. Stephens College, Delhi (B.Sc.), CSJMU, Kanpur (M.A, L.L.B)
- Profession: Advocate

Jagendra Swarup (2 July 1949 – 30 July 2014) was an Indian politician, educationist and advocate from Uttar Pradesh, India. He served as a Member of the Legislative Council (MLC) from Kanpur Graduates constituency for 34 years. The constituency was held by the family for 99 years and his father, Virendra Swarup, served it for nearly 24 years. He died on 30 July 2014 in Delhi, at the age of 65, while undergoing treatment for a liver ailment.

== Early life and education ==
Swarup was born in Kanpur, Uttar Pradesh, to Dhara Rani Swarup and Virendra Swarup, an educationist and former chairman of the Uttar Pradesh Legislative Council, who was elected four times as MLC from the Kanpur division graduates constituency. After his schooling at Methodist High School, Kanpur, he did his B.Sc. at St. Stephens College, Delhi. Later, he completed his master's in political science at Christ Church College, Kanpur, and passed out with the chancellor's gold medal in 1970. He also did an LLB in 1972 at VSSD College, Kanpur, being awarded the chancellor's gold medal again for topping the university. He later cleared the civil services examination, attaining an IPS cadre, but opted not to enter the field.

== Political career ==
Jagendra Swarup served as an MLC for six consecutive terms as an independent politician. When he first became MLC of Kanpur-Jhansi graduate constituency in 1980, it consisted of seven districts. After delimitation, the Kanpur Graduate constituency was formed by combining three districts (Kanpur Nagar, Kanpur Dehat, and Unnao) instead of Kanpur-Jhansi. He won the election from this constituency for consecutive terms in 1980, 1986, 1992, 1998, 2004 and 2010. His tenure in the legislative council began in 1980, and at the time of his passing, 2 years of his tenure were still remaining.

== Professional career ==
He was an advocate and legal advisor to many institutions, including Indian Institute of Technology, Kanpur, Uttar Pradesh Financial Corporation, British India Corporation, JK Group and CSJMU. He was also on the board of directors of Jaykay Enterprises Limited, JK Synthetics, JK Cement, and Frost International Limited among others. He had previously served as a member of the BCCI Working Committee, and as the president of the Uttar Pradesh Cricket Association for 15 years, being made a patron of the cricket body in 2005. During his time the flood lights at Green Park Stadium, Kanpur, were installed.

== Philanthropy ==
Swarup served as the general secretary of Dayanand Shiksha Sansthan, a non-profit organisation that manages more than 20 postgraduate and junior colleges all over Uttar Pradesh and Uttarakhand. He was also on the board of management of DAV College, Kanpur, DAV College, Dehradun, DBS College, Dehradun, DSN College, Unnao, and DWT College, Kanpur among others. He was a member of the executive council of Bundelkhand University, Jhansi, Dr Bhimrao Ambedkar University, Agra, CSJMU, Kanpur, and Ramganga Area Development Authority. He served on the board of governors (BOG) of Harcourt Butler Technical University, Kanpur.

== Personal life ==
Swarup is survived by his wife, Sandhya Swarup, his son, Manvendra Swarup, and a daughter. His wife serves as the Mahamantri of Dayanand Shiksha Sansthan, and his son, Manvendra Swarup, is the secretary of the organisation.

== Legacy and Awards ==
In 1987, Jagendra Swarup was honoured with the 'Citizens Award' by the then president Giani Zail Singh for the development of education, its promotion, and social work. For his social work, the American Biological Institute awarded him the 'Man of the Year Award' in 1995. To honour his legacy, DAV College, Kanpur, introduced the Jagendra Swarup Gold Medal. A park in Kanpur was named after him.
