= Sriprakash Jaiswal =

Indian politician (1944–2025)

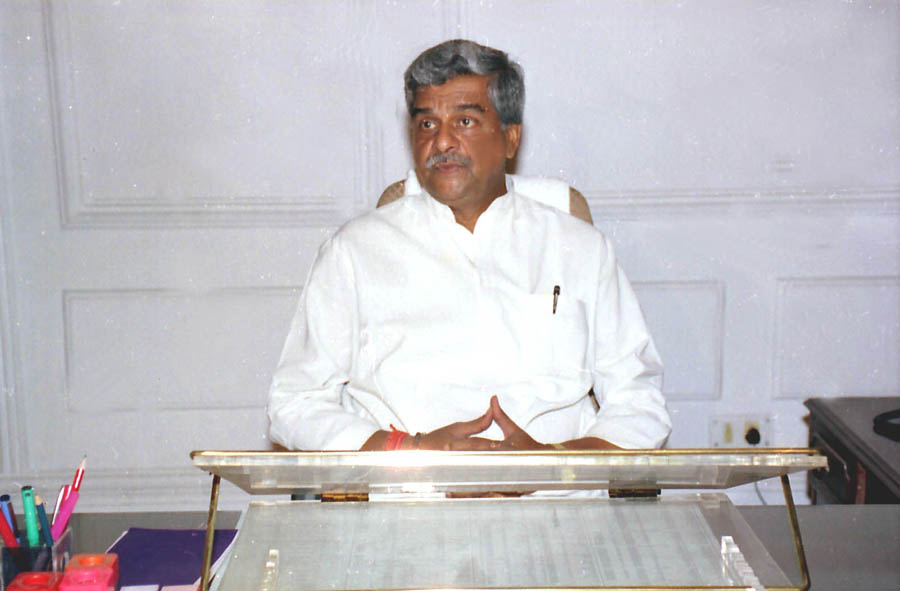
- Jaiswal in 2004

Member of Parliament, Lok Sabha
- In office 10 October 1999 – 22 May 2014
- Preceded by: Jagatvir Singh Drona
- Succeeded by: Murli Manohar Joshi
- Constituency: Kanpur

Minister of Coal Government of India
- In office 19 January 2011 – 26 May 2014
- Prime Minister: Manmohan Singh
- Succeeded by: Piyush Goyal

Minister of State in Ministry of Home Affairs Government of India
- In office 23 May 2004 – 22 May 2009
- Prime Minister: Manmohan Singh
- Preceded by: Chinmayanand Swami
- Succeeded by: Mullappally Ramachandran; Ajay Maken

President of Uttar Pradesh Congress Committee
- In office 4 December 2000 – 3 July 2002
- Preceded by: Salman Khurshid
- Succeeded by: Arun Kumar Singh Munna

Personal details
- Born: 25 September 1944 Kanpur, United Provinces, British India
- Died: 28 November 2025 (aged 81) Kanpur, Uttar Pradesh, India
- Party: Indian National Congress
- Spouse: Maya Rani Jaiswal
- Children: 2 sons, 1 daughter, 2 grandsons
- Website: www.sriprakashjaiswal.info
- As of 11 February, 2013

Sriprakash Jaiswal (25 September 1944 – 28 November 2025), also written Shriprakash or Sri Prakash, was an Indian politician. He served as a member of Parliament for the Indian National Congress and as Minister of State for Home Affairs. He also held ministry of coal for three years, 2011–2014.

== Early life ==
Jaiswal completed his education in BNSD Inter College. He married Maya Rani on 28 April 1967 and had two sons and one daughter.

== Career ==
His first political assignment was serving Kanpur city as its mayor in 1989.

He won the 1999 Lok Sabha election and was reelected in 2004 and 2009. He served as Minister of State for Home Affairs in 2004.

He was elevated to Minister Of State (Independent Charge) in 2009 holding dual charges of Coal and Statistics And Programme Implementation. In 2014 Lok Sabha elections he lost his seat.

== Overseas engagements ==
In Aug 2009, when Indian students were being attacked in Australia, Jaiswal had visited Melbourne to meet with International students from India. Jaiswal visited temples, hospitals, and travelled in trains and public transport in Melbourne to meet victims, and interact with Indian students in Australia, to get a better understanding of the situation.

Jaiswal visited the Victorian Parliament and met with then Victorian Opposition Leader Ted Baillieu, and his ministerial advisor to raise concerns about attacks on Indian students in Melbourne, Australia. Earlier, in July 2009, Jaiswal had met with Baillieu during his visit to Delhi to get updates on the situation. He then personally traveled to Melbourne the following month to assess the situation firsthand.

== Controversies ==
Jaiswal mostly stayed out of the political spats and media. However, he came into the limelight when the Indian coal allocation scam erupted via a leaked Report of the Comptroller and Auditor General of India (CAG) in August 2012. He was not the Coal Minister at the time of the crime, but was criticised by the opposition. Jaiswal, however, maintained that the Coal Allocation Process was proper and that the report was disputable. He defended then Prime Minister Manmohan Singh.

Another controversy arose while Jaiswal was attending a cultural event in Kanpur; he made sexist remarks, saying 'A new victory and a new marriage have their own importance. But as times passes, the memories of a victory go old and as time passes, a wife gets old, the same charm is not there'. He later apologized. His remarks received nationwide criticism and a petition was filed against him in the Court by Women's Organizations.

== Death ==
Jaiswal died on 28 November 2025, at the age of 81.
