= Sohil Akhtar Ansari =

Indian politician (born 1964)

Member of Legislative Assembly, Uttar Pradesh
- In office 11 March 2017 – 10 March 2022
- Preceded by: Raghunandan Singh Bhadauria
- Succeeded by: Mohammad Hassan Roomi
- Constituency: Kanpur Cantt.

Personal details
- Born: 20 October 1964 (age 61) Kanpur, Uttar Pradesh, India
- Party: Indian National Congress
- Spouse: Tabassum Sohil (m. 2003)
- Education: Matriculation
- Occupation: Real Estate Developer & Investor
- Profession: Politician

Sohil Akhtar Ansari is an Indian politician and a former member of Uttar Pradesh Legislative Assembly. He was elected to the state legislature in the 2017 assembly elections from Kanpur Cantt. constituency of Kanpur Nagar district as an INC candidate. He was formerly associated with BSP on whose ticket he contested the 2012 assembly elections unsuccessfully.

== Political career ==
Ansari was a member of the 17th Legislative Assembly of Uttar Pradesh. 2017 to 2022, he represented the Kanpur Cantonment constituency as a member of the INC.

== Posts held ==
#	From	To	Position	Comments
01	2017	2022	Member, 17th Legislative Assembly	

== See also ==
- Uttar Pradesh Legislative Assembly
