= Pramila Pandey =

Indian politician (born 1956)

Mayor Of Kanpur
- Incumbent
- Assumed office 12 December 2017
- Preceded by: Jagatvir Singh Drona

Corporator, Kanpur Municipal Corporation
- In office 1995–2006

Personal details
- Born: 15 August 1956 (age 69) Jaunpur, Uttar Pradesh, India
- Party: Bharatiya Janata Party
- Spouse: Laxmi Shanker Pandey
- Children: Amit Pandey, Anoop Pandey, Anurag Pandey (Vice Chairman, Bar Council of Uttar Pradesh)
- Education: Intermediate
- Profession: Politician

Pramila Pandey is an Indian politician from the state of Uttar Pradesh. She is the mayor of Kanpur Municipal Corporation. She won by over 1.77 Lakhs votes to her nearest Samajwadi Party rival Vandana Bajpai.

She was the vice-president of the BJP for Kanpur before becoming a mayor.

Political offices
Preceded by Jagatvir Singh Drona	Mayor Of Kanpur; 2017–present	Incumbent
