= Salil Vishnoi =

Indian politician

Salil Vishnoi सलिल विश्नोई

Member of Uttar Pradesh Legislative Council
- Incumbent
- Assumed office 31 January 2021
- Constituency: elected by Legislative Assembly members

Member of Uttar Pradesh Legislative Assembly
- In office 2012–2017
- Preceded by: Haji Irfan Solanki
- Succeeded by: Amitabh Bajpai
- Constituency: Arya Nagar
- In office 2002–2012
- Preceded by: Neeraj Chaturvedi
- Succeeded by: constituency abolished
- Constituency: Generalganj

Personal details
- Born: 9 July 1955 (age 69); Auraiya (Uttar Pradesh)
- Political party: Bharatiya Janata Party
- Spouse: Rochana Vishnoi (m. 1981)
- Children: 1 son, 2 daughters
- Education: B.Sc, LLB
- Profession: Industrialist, Politician
- Website: www.salilvishnoi.com

Salil Vishnoi (born 9 July 1955) is an Indian politician from Kanpur, Uttar Pradesh who is the state vice president of Bharatiya Janata Party in Uttar Pradesh. He was former member of Uttar Pradesh Legislative Assembly from Arya Nagar. He has earlier served Generalganj constituency of Kanpur as MLA three times. He was the former student of BNSD Inter College.
