= Kanpur Cantonment Assembly constituency =

Constituency of the Uttar Pradesh legislative assembly in India

Kanpur Cantonment
- Constituency No. 216 for the Uttar Pradesh Legislative Assembly

Constituency details
- Country: India
- Region: North India
- State: Uttar Pradesh
- District: Kanpur Nagar
- Lok Sabha constituency: Kanpur
- Total electors: 3,74,262 (2024)
- Reservation: None

Member of Legislative Assembly
- 18th Uttar Pradesh Legislative Assembly
- Incumbent Mohammad Hassan Roomi
- Party: Samajwadi Party
- Elected year: 2022

Kanpur Cantonment Assembly constituency is one of 403 legislative assembly seats of Uttar Pradesh. It is part of the Kanpur Lok Sabha constituency.

== Overview ==
Kanpur Cantonment comprises Kanpur (CB), Northern Railway Colony (CT), Wards No. 17, 23, 56, 58, 70, 75, 81, 84, 93, 97, 99 and 100 in Kanpur Municipal Corporation of 2- Kanpur Sadar Tehsil.

== Members of Legislative Assembly ==
Year	Member	Party
1967	Devi Sahai Bajpai	Indian National Congress
1969	Manohar Lal	Bharatiya Kranti Dal
1974	Shyam Mishra	Indian National Congress
1977	Babu Ram Shukla	Janata Party
1980	Bhudhar Narayan Mishra	Indian National Congress (I)
1985	Pashupati Nath Mehrotra	Indian National Congress
1989	Ganesh Dixit	Janata Dal
1991	Satish Mahana	Bharatiya Janata Party
1993	Satish Mahana	Bharatiya Janata Party
1996	Satish Mahana	Bharatiya Janata Party
2002	Satish Mahana	Bharatiya Janata Party
2007	Satish Mahana	Bharatiya Janata Party
2012	Raghunandan Singh Bhadauria	Bharatiya Janata Party
2017	Sohil Akhtar Ansari	Indian National Congress
2022	Mohammad Hassan Roomi	Samajwadi Party

== Election results ==
=== 2027 ===
2027 Uttar Pradesh Legislative Assembly election: Kanpur Cantonment
Party	Candidate	Votes	%	±%
INDIA				
NDA				
BSP				
NOTA	None of the above			
Majority				
Turnout				
gain from		Swing		

=== 2022 ===
U. P. Assembly Election, 2022: Kanpur Cantt.
Party	Candidate	Votes	%	±%
SP	Mohammad Hassan Roomi	94,729	49.99	+46.62
BJP	Raghunandan Singh Bhadauria	74,742	39.44	−1.25
INC	Sohil Akhtar Ansari	13,279	7.01	−38.99
BSP	Mohammad Shafi	3,389	1.79	−6.19
NOTA	None of the above	740	0.39	−0.02
Majority		19,987	10.55	+5.24
Turnout		189,492	52.37	−0.21
SP gain from INC		Swing	+3.99	

=== 2017 ===
U. P. Legislative Assembly Election, 2017: Kanpur Cantonment
Party	Candidate	Votes	%	±%
INC	Sohil Akhtar Ansari	81,169	46.0	
BJP	Raghunandan Singh Bhadauria	71,805	40.69	
BSP	Dr.Naseem Ahmad	14,079	7.98	
SP	Mohammad Hassan Roomi	5,954	3.37	
NOTA	None of the above	729	0.41	
Majority		9,364	5.31	
Turnout		176,462	52.58	
INC gain from BJP		Swing	+16.52	

=== 2012 ===
U. P. Legislative Assembly Election, 2012: Kanpur Cantonment
Party	Candidate	Votes	%	±%
BJP	Raghunandan Singh Bhadauria	42,551	29.48	
SP	Mohammad Hassan Roomi	33,243	23.03	
INC	Abdul Mannan Ansari	31,122	21.56	
BSP	Sohil Akhtar Ansari	26,205	18.15	
PECP	Mohammad Tahir Ansari	5,371	3.72	
Majority		9,308	6.45	
Turnout		1,44,351	48.46	
BJP hold		Swing		

=== 2007 ===
U. P. Legislative Assembly Election, 2007: Kanpur Cantonment
Party	Candidate	Votes	%	±%
BJP	Satish Mahana	47,381	46.73	
SP	Mehtab Alam	20,845	20.56	
INC	Ganesh Dixit	15,935	15.72	
BSP	Narendra Singh	13,375	13.19	
Independent	Raju Sonker	1,089	1.07	
Majority		26,536	26.17	
Turnout		1,01,394	40.39	
BJP hold		Swing		

=== 2002 ===
U. P. Legislative Assembly Election, 2002: Kanpur Cantonment
Party	Candidate	Votes	%	±%
BJP	Satish Mahana	45,839	45.88	
INC	Girish Kumar Trivedi	35,774	35.81	
SP	Som Chandra Gupta	12,502	12.51	
BSP	Mahammed Haneef	3,578	3.58	
Independent	Vakeel	700	0.70	
Majority		10,065	10.07	
Turnout		99,909	37.00	
BJP hold		Swing		

=== 1996 ===
Uttar Pradesh assembly elections, 1996: Kanpur Cantonment
Party	Candidate	Votes	%	±%
BJP	Satish Mahana	64,578	59.51	
BSP	Ashok Kumar Kaalia	23,087	21.27	
SP	Ganesh Awasthi	19,927	18.39	
ABHM	Pravin Gopal Jee	367	0.34	
Natural Law	Asim Alam	214	0.20	
Majority		41,491	38.24	
Turnout		1,08,498	42.37	
BJP hold		Swing		

=== 1993 ===
Uttar Pradesh assembly elections, 1993: Kanpur Cantonment
Party	Candidate	Votes	%	±%
BJP	Satish Mahana	59,013	52.19	
SP	Ganesh Dixit	36,208	32.08	
INC	Sriprakash Jaiswal	15,679	13.87	
JD	Laxmi Shankar	826	0.73	
JP	Devendra Kumar	209	0.18	
Majority		22,805	20.11	
Turnout		1,13,069	55.09	
BJP hold		Swing		

=== 1991 ===
Uttar Pradesh assembly elections, 1991: Kanpur Cantonment
Party	Candidate	Votes	%	±%
BJP	Satish Mahana	33,897	44.60	
INC	Shyam Mishra	17,927	23.59	
Independent	Ganesh Dixit	12,661	16.66	
JP	Deepak Kumar	7,703	10.14	
BSP	Naseem Ahmed	2,793	3.68	
Majority		15,970	21.01	
Turnout		76,000	37.46	
BJP gain from JD		Swing		

=== 1989 ===
U. P. Assembly Election, 1989: Kanpur Cantonment
Party	Candidate	Votes	%	±%
JD	Ganesh Dixit	29,511	38.46	
INC	Pashupati Nath Mehrotra	21,930	28.58	
BJP	Hari Dixit	16,566	21.59	
Independent	Babu Ram Shukla	4,623	6.03	
BSP	Shiv Prasad	2,606	3.40	
Majority		7,581	9.88	
Turnout		76,727	38.21	
JD gain from INC		Swing		

=== 1985 ===
U. P. Legislative Assembly Election, 1985: Kanpur Cantonment
Party	Candidate	Votes	%	±%
INC	Pashupati Nath	25,551	65.15	
LKD	Laxmi Shanker	7,561	19.28	
BJP	Virbhadra Misra	4,279	10.91	
JP	Deen Dayal	548	1.40	
Independent	Ateekur Rahman	400	1.02	
Majority		17,990	45.87	
Turnout		39,216	27.60	
INC hold		Swing		

U. P. Assembly Election, 2017 Kanpur Lok Sabha Constituency Summary
Party	Seats won	Seat change
Bharatiya Janata Party	2	▼1
Samajwadi Party	2	▲1
Indian National Congress	1	0
Bahujan Samaj Party	0	0

== See also ==
- List of Vidhan Sabha constituencies of Uttar Pradesh
