= Manohar Lal (politician) =

Indian politician

Manohar Lal (born 3 June 1938) is an Indian politician and a former Minister of Labour, Justice and Transport in the Government of Uttar Pradesh. He was also elected to the 6th Lok Sabha (1977–80) from Kanpur parliamentary constituency, the Lower House of Indian Parliament.

Born to Chunni Lal at Wajidpur village, near Jajmau, Kanpur district, he was educated at J.P.R.N. Inter College, Jajmau, Kanpur, later received B. A. degree from Christ Church College, Kanpur and L.L.B. from Dayanand College of Law, Kanpur, both then affiliated with Agra University.

He was a member of Kanpur Municipal Corporation (Kanpur Nagar Mahapalika), 1959–72; Secretary and Chairman of various educational, social and cultural institutions. In 1969 state elections, he was elected member of Uttar Pradesh Legislative Assembly, 1969—74 from Kanpur Cantonment state assembly constituency, as a Bharatiya Kranti Dal candidate. He polled 25376 votes and beat his nearest rival Devi Sahai Bajpai of Congress (INC) by 10379 votes, and later remained Minister of Labour, Justice and Transport in the Uttar Pradesh Government, 1970–71. He was elected to 6th Lok Sabha in the 1977 Indian general election from Kanpur Lok Sabha constituency as Bharatiya Lok Dal candidate. He received 269629 votes, and his nearest rival was Naresh Chandra Chaturvedi of Congress (INC) with 95340 votes.

He married Ganga Shri Devi, in 1950 and the couple has two sons and one daughter.
