= Maharajpur, Uttar Pradesh Assembly constituency =

Constituency of the Uttar Pradesh legislative assembly in India

Maharajpur
- Constituency No. 217 for the Uttar Pradesh Legislative Assembly
- Satish Mahana; MLA and Incumbent Speaker of Legislative Assembly

Constituency details
- Country: India
- Region: North India
- State: Uttar Pradesh
- District: Kanpur Nagar
- Lok Sabha constituency: Akbarpur
- Reservation: None

Member of Legislative Assembly
- 18th Uttar Pradesh Legislative Assembly
- Incumbent Satish Mahana
- Party: Bharatiya Janta Party
- Alliance: NDA
- Elected year: 2022

Maharajpur Assembly constituency is one of 403 legislative assembly seats of Uttar Pradesh. It is part of the Akbarpur Lok Sabha constituency. Since 2008, this assembly constituency is numbered 217 amongst 403 constituencies.

Maharajpur comprises KCs 2-Maharajpur, 3-Narwal, Chakeri (CT), Ward Nos. 9, 24, 31, 35, 38, 40, 41, 53, and 77 in Kanpur Municipal Corporation of 2-Kanpur Sadar Tehsil.

In 2022 Uttar Pradesh Legislative Assembly election, BJP candidate Satish Mahana won the elections by defeating Samajwadi Party candidate Fateh Bahadur Singh Gill by the margin of 82,261 votes. Currently he is serving as the Speaker of the Legislative Assembly.

== Member of Legislative Assembly ==
Year	Member	Party
Till 2012 : Constituency did not exist
2012	Satish Mahana	Bharatiya Janata Party
2017	Satish Mahana	Bharatiya Janata Party
2022	Satish Mahana	Bharatiya Janata Party

== Election results ==
=== 2027 ===
2027 Uttar Pradesh Legislative Assembly election: Maharajpur
Party	Candidate	Votes	%	±%
INDIA				
NDA				
BSP				
NOTA	None of the above			
Majority				
Turnout				
gain from		Swing		

=== 2022 ===
2022 Uttar Pradesh Legislative Assembly election: Maharajpur
Party	Candidate	Votes	%	±%
BJP	Satish Mahana	152,883	60.6	▲4.67
SP	Fateh Bahadur Singh Gill	70,622	28.0	▲11.63
BSP	Surendra Pal Singh	15,113	5.99	▼11.15
INC	Kanishka Pandey	7,280	2.89	▼5.01
NOTA	None of the above	1,372	0.54	▼0.04
Majority		82,261	32.6	▼6.19
Turnout		252,262	56.25	▼1.62
BJP hold		Swing	▲4.68	

=== 2017 ===
2017 Uttar Pradesh Legislative Assembly election: Maharajpur
Party	Candidate	Votes	%	±%
BJP	Satish Mahana	132,394	55.93	
BSP	Manoj Kumar Shukla	40,568	17.14	
SP	Aruna Tomar	38,752	16.37	
INC	Raja Ram Pal	18,697	7.9	
NOTA	None of the above	1,359	0.58	
Majority		91,826	38.79	
Turnout		236,731	57.87	
BJP hold		Swing	▲17.93	

=== 2012 ===
2012 Uttar Pradesh Legislative Assembly election: Maharajpur
Party	Candidate	Votes	%	±%
BJP	Satish Mahana	83,144	37.99	
BSP	Shikha Mishra	53,255	24.34	
SP	Aruna Tomar	51,585	23.57	
INC	Dharmraj Singh Chauhan	16,938	7.74	
PECP	Mohammad Usman	2,039	0.93	
Majority		29,889	13.65	
Turnout		2,18,833	56.15	
BJP win (new seat)				

== See also ==
- List of Vidhan Sabha constituencies of Uttar Pradesh
- Uttar Pradesh Legislature
- Uttar Pradesh Legislative Assembly
