= Kanpur Municipal Corporation =

Local civic body in Kanpur, Uttar Pradesh, India

Type
- Type: Municipal Corporation of the Kanpur
- Established: in 1861 as Municipality of Cawnpore

Leadership
- Mayor: Pramila Pandey, BJP since 12 December 2017
- Municipal Commissioner: Arpit Upadhyay, IAS

Structure
- Seats: 110
- Political groups: Government (73): BJP (73); Opposition (37): SP (17); INC (5); IND (15)

Elections
- Voting system: First past the post
- Last election: 11 May 2023
- Next election: 2028

Meeting place
- City Hall (KMC Building), Moti Jheel, Kanpur, Uttar Pradesh

Website
- kmc.up.nic.in

Kanpur Municipal Corporation (KMC) is a municipal corporation of Kanpur city in Indian state of Uttar Pradesh. Kanpur has area of 108. 63 km^{2}. The corporation has 110 wards covering area equal to 403 square kilometres.

== History ==
The municipality in Kanpur, then Cawnpore was first established on 22 November 1861 under the chairmenship of a District Magistrate. Lala Sheo Prasad was the first Vice Chairman of the association of Cawnpore Municipal Committee. The Town Hall building was erected at Cooperganj in the year 1879 with investment of around 2,16,000 rupees.

The first drainage system was established in 1872 and the first protected water supply in 1892. The city became a municipal corporation in 1959. Ram Ratan Gupta became the first mayor of Kanpur.

== Elections ==
See List of mayors of Kanpur

== See also ==
Kanpur (Mayoral Constituency)
