= Generalganj Assembly constituency =

Former constituency of the Uttar Pradesh legislative assembly in India

Coordinates: 26.47°N 80.35°E

Generalganj
- Former constituency for the Uttar Pradesh Legislative Assembly

Constituency details
- Country: India
- Region: North India
- State: Uttar Pradesh
- District: Kanpur Nagar
- Established: 1967
- Abolished: 2012

Generalganj (Assembly constituency) was a legislative assembly of Uttar Pradesh. As a consequence of the orders of the Delimitation Commission, Generalganj (Assembly constituency) ceased to exist in 2012.

== Member of Legislative Assembly ==
Year	Neme	Party
1967	Ganga Ram Talwar	Bharatiya Jana Sangh
1969	Ganesh Dutt Bajpai	Indian National Congress
1977	Reoti Raman Rastogi	Janata Party
1980	Suman Lata Dixit	Indian National Congress (I)
1985	Virendra Nath Dixit	Indian National Congress
1989	Virendra Nath Dixit	Janata Dal
1991	Neeraj Chaturvedi	Bharatiya Janata Party
1993	Neeraj Chaturvedi	Bharatiya Janata Party
1996	Neeraj Chaturvedi	Bharatiya Janata Party
2002	Salil Vishnoi	Bharatiya Janata Party
2007	Salil Vishnoi	Bharatiya Janata Party

== Election results ==
=== 2007 ===
2007 Uttar Pradesh Legislative Assembly election: Generalganj
Party	Candidate	Votes	%	±%
BJP	Salil Vishnoi	29,461	40.00	
SP	Surendra Mohan Agarwal	26,977	36.63	
INC	Abdul Mannan Ansari	11,355	15.42	
BSP	Sarvesh Shukla	4,209	5.71	
Independent	Mumtaz Ahmad Siddiqui	380	0.51	
Majority		2,484	3.37	
Turnout		73,637	41.55	
BJP hold		Swing		

Uttar Pradesh Legislative Assembly Election, 2002: Generalganj
Party	Candidate	Votes	%	±%
BJP	Salil Vishnoi	28,854	36.14	
INC	Abdul Mannan Ansari	27,823	34.85	
SP	Surendra Mohan Agarwal	19,475	24.40	
BSP	Asif Hussain	2,084	2.61	
Independent	Anwari Kinnar	497	0.62	
Majority		1,031	1.29	
Turnout		79,830	39.11	
BJP hold		Swing		

Uttar Pradesh Legislative Assembly Election, 1996: Generalganj
Party	Candidate	Votes	%	±%
BJP	Neeraj Chaturvedi	37,411	39.65	
SP	Surendra Mohan Agarwal	34,664	36.74	
BSP	Ashok Kumar Dixit	20,523	21.75	
Natural Law	Mohammad Naseem	846	0.90	
Independent	Mohammad Suleman	549	0.58	
Majority		2,747	2.91	
Turnout		94,349	47.21	
BJP hold		Swing		

Uttar Pradesh Legislative Assembly Election, 1993: Generalganj
Party	Candidate	Votes	%	±%
BJP	Neeraj Chaturvedi	45,254	46.10	
SP	Anant Misra Antu	38,090	38.80	
INC	Shyam Mishra	12,114	12.34	
JD	Virendra Nath Dixit	1,327	1.35	
SS	Subodh Kumar Chopra	340	0.35	
Majority		7,164	7.30	
Turnout		98,161	56.10	
BJP hold		Swing		

Uttar Pradesh Legislative Assembly Election, 1991: Generalganj
Party	Candidate	Votes	%	±%
BJP	Neeraj Chaturvedi	38,816	53.00	
INC	Sita Ram Dixit	13,958	19.06	
JP	Syed Mohammad Ahamad	13,376	18.26	
Independent	Shanker Datt Mishra	3,176	4.34	
BSP	Mohammad Raza	2,405	3.28	
Majority		24,858	33.94	
Turnout		73,235	42.20	
BJP gain from JD		Swing		

=== 1989 ===
Uttar Pradesh Legislative Assembly Election, 1989: Generalganj
Party	Candidate	Votes	%	±%
JD	Virendra Nath Dixit	21,653	29.30	
INC	Ragendra Swarup	18,796	25.44	
BJP	Neeraj Chaturvedi	18,274	24.73	
IND.	Mohammad Raza	12,450	16.85	
BSP	Ram Asrey	1,668	2.26	
Majority		2,857	3.86	
Turnout		73,889	44.78	
JD gain from INC		Swing		

=== 1985 ===
Uttar Pradesh Legislative Assembly Election, 1985: Generalganj
Party	Candidate	Votes	%	±%
INC	Virendra Nath Dixit	23,262	52.33	
BJP	Babu Ram Shukla	14,244	32.04	
LKD	Babu Badre	4,391	9.88	
JP	Bharat Singh	1,612	3.63	
Independent	Irshad Ali	383	0.86	
Majority		9,018	20.29	
Turnout		44,455	31.89	
INC hold		Swing		

== See also ==
- List of Vidhan Sabha constituencies of Uttar Pradesh
