= Amitabh Bajpai =

Indian politician

Member of the Uttar Pradesh legislative assembly
- Incumbent
- Assumed office 11 March 2017
- Preceded by: Salil Vishnoi
- Constituency: Arya Nagar

Personal details
- Born: 31 July 1974 (age 51) Kanpur (Uttar Pradesh)
- Party: Samajwadi Party
- Spouse: BC Vandana Bajpai
- Children: One Son, One Daughter
- Education: B. Sc., M. B. A.
- Alma mater: PPN College; Bundelkhand University
- Profession: Agriculturist, Businessman and Politician

Amitabh Bajpai (born 31 July, 1974) is an Indian politician and member of Uttar Pradesh Legislative Assembly.

Amitabh Bajpai of SP has won the Arya Nagar seat of Uttar Pradesh legislative assembly in 2017.

In 2017 elections he defeated Salil Vishnoi of BJP. Later in 2022 elections he again emerged victorious and his nearest rival was Suresh Awasthi of BJP.
