= Raghunandan Singh Bhadauria =

Indian politician

Raghunandan Singh Bhadauria रघुनंदन सिंह भदौरिया

Member of Legislative Assembly, Uttar Pradesh
- In office 6 March 2012 – 11 March 2017
- Preceded by: Satish Mahana
- Succeeded by: Sohil Akhtar Ansari
- Constituency: Kanpur Cantt.

Personal details
- Born: 15 July 1962 (age 63); Kanpur, Uttar Pradesh, India
- Political party: Bharatiya Janata Party
- Spouse: Anuradha Singh Bhadauria
- Children: 2

Raghunandan Singh Bhadauria (born 15 July 1962) is an Indian politician who was a member of Sixteenth Legislative Assembly of Uttar Pradesh. He won the 2012 assembly election from Kanpur Cantt. as a BJP candidate.
