= Sharfuddin Ahmad =

Indian lawyer

Sharfuddin Ahmad (born 15 September 1955), is an Indian lawyer, political leader and author. In 1996, he contested in the 11th Lok Sabha Elections from Kanpur Constituency under the platform of Bahujan Samaj Party. Presently he is the national vice-president of the Social Democratic Party of India.

== Early life and education ==
He was born at Farrukhabad in Uttar Pradesh, India on 15 September 1955. He studied law at the Aligarh Muslim University, Aligarh. He started his career as an advocate at the Fatehgarh District Court and after working for around two years he shifted to Allahabad High Court. After the Communal Violence of 1992 in Kanpur he appeared for hundreds of victims irrespective of their religion in courts without any monetary benefits. On 8 February 2020 he launched ALL INDIA PRACTISING LAWYERS COUNCIL in New Delhi and was elected as its National Secretary General.

== Political views ==
Sharfuddin Ahmad thinks that political empowerment is the key for those communities which are being harassed and victimised by different kinds of atrocities because of their personal identity such as Dalits, Minorities, Progressives, etc. Recently, he gave the suggestion to waive off all the farmer loans to save them from committing suicide. He also raised worries regarding the unpatriotic and anti-nationals labels put on various people and said that now a constitutional crisis is being developed. He said that the caste terror is being developed by some organisations in the country and the democracy of the country is at stake. He demands that all secular forces should come together to fight out and save the secularism and democracy of the country by formulating united actions. On 24 December 2017, Social Democratic Party of India published a book 'Ayodhya- Pawn on the Political Chess' written by Sharfuddin Ahmad. The book guides towards controlling the communal ambience and strengthening brotherhood to preserve the democratic values. The book is an effort towards stepping-up belief in country's social setup as per India's Constitution. While launching All India Practising Lawyers Council, in his key note address, Advocate Sharfuddin Ahmad, National Vice-President of Social Democratic Party of India (SDPI) said: "The State has been turned into an instrument at the hands of capitalistic forces, the media is reduced as propaganda machine promoting the anti-people programmes of the government and hostility among various sections particularly between Hindus and Muslims. The dissent and disagreement to the government policies and programmes are being branded as antinational".
