= Satish Mahana =

18th Speaker of the Uttar Pradesh Legislative Assembly since 2022

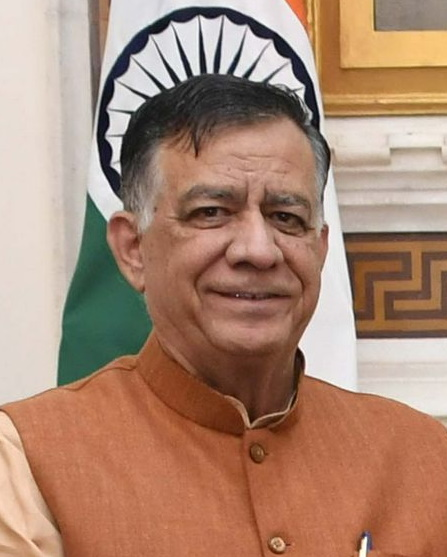
- Official portrait, 2024

18th Speaker of the Uttar Pradesh Legislative Assembly
- Incumbent
- Assumed office 29 March 2022
- Governor: Anandiben Patel
- Preceded by: Hriday Narayan Dikshit

Minister of Industrial Development of Uttar Pradesh
- In office 19 March 2017 – 25 March 2022
- Chief Minister: Yogi Adityanath
- Preceded by: Akhilesh Yadav
- Succeeded by: Nand Gopal Gupta

Minister of Khadi, Village Industries, Sericulture, Textile, MSME and Export Promotion of Uttar Pradesh
- In office 17 June 2019 – 21 August 2019
- Chief Minister: Yogi Adityanath
- Preceded by: Satyadev Pachauri
- Succeeded by: Sidharth Nath Singh

Minister of State for Urban Development of Uttar Pradesh
- In office 23 October 1997 – 8 March 2002
- Chief Minister: Kalyan Singh; Ram Prakash Gupta; Rajnath Singh

Member of Uttar Pradesh Legislative Assembly
- Incumbent
- Assumed office 8 March 2012
- Preceded by: Constituency established
- Constituency: Maharajpur
- In office 1991–2012
- Preceded by: Ganesh Dixit
- Succeeded by: Raghunandan Singh Bhadauria
- Constituency: Kanpur Cantonment

Personal details
- Born: 14 October 1960 (age 65) Kanpur, Uttar Pradesh, India
- Party: Bharatiya Janata Party
- Spouse: Anita Mahana (m. 1981)
- Children: 2
- Education: Kanpur University (B.Sc)
- Occupation: Politician
- Website: www.satishmahana.net

Satish Mahana (born 14 October 1960) is an Indian politician and a member of the Legislative Assembly of Uttar Pradesh. Currently, he is serving as the 18th Speaker of the Legislative Assembly since 2022. He has been an eight-time MLA, having served since the 11th Legislative Assembly, formerly from Kanpur Cantt and currently representing Maharajpur constituency of Kanpur. He participated in the 2009 general elections as a BJP candidate from Kanpur. He was the Vice Leader of Bharatiya Janata Party in 16th Vidhan Sabha of Uttar Pradesh and he is a former coordinator of Bajrang Dal youth wing of Vishva Hindu Parishad at Kanpur Purvottar District.

== Early life and education ==
Mahana was born on 14 October 1960 in Kanpur, Uttar Pradesh to his father Ram Avtar Mahana, in a Hindu Khatri family. In 1981 he married Anita Mahana, they have one son Karan Mahana and one daughter Neha Mahana. He did his early schooling from St. Joseph's Senior Secondary School, Kanpur. He attended the Kanpur University and attained Bachelor of Science degree.

== Political career ==
Mahana is serving as MLA of UP for 8th term. Mahana has been MLA for 8 straight terms. He served as Minister of State for Housing and Urban Developing from 27 October 1997 to 8 March 2002 but because of his good work he was again given the post of Minister of State for Housing. After 2012, he represents Maharajpur (Uttar Pradesh Assembly constituency) of Kanpur Nagar district of Uttar Pradesh. In 2017 elections, he defeated his nearest rival Bahujan Samaj Party candidate Manoj Kumar Shukla by a record margin of 91,826 votes.

In March 2017, he was appointed Cabinet Minister in Yogi Adityanath Cabinet. He got ministry of Industrial Development in Uttar Pradesh Government. The slogan 'Jiske Sath Jamana hai, uska naam mahana hai' is also related to him.

He was awarded the Ideal Legislative Assembly Speaker Award at the 14th Bharatiya Chhatra Sansad, Pune, 2025.

== Posts held ==
| # | From | To | Position | Comments |
|---|---|---|---|---|
| 01 | March 2022 | Incumbent | Speaker of Legislative Assembly | |
| 02 | March 2022 | Incumbent | Member, 18th Legislative Assembly | |
| 03 | March 2017 | March 2022 | Cabinet Minister for Industrial Development | First Yogi Adityanath ministry |
| 04 | March 2017 | March 2022 | Member, 17th Legislative Assembly | |
| 05 | March 2012 | March 2017 | Member, 16th Legislative Assembly | |
| 06 | May 2007 | March 2012 | Member, 15th Legislative Assembly | |
| 07 | February 2002 | May 2007 | Member, 14th Legislative Assembly | |
| 08 | October 1997 | March 2002 | Minister of State for Housing, Urban Development | |
| 09 | 1996 | 2002 | Member, 13th Legislative Assembly | |
| 10 | 1993 | 1995 | Member, 12th Legislative Assembly | |
| 11 | 1991 | 1992 | Member, 11th Legislative Assembly | |
