= Mohammad Hassan Roomi =

Indian politician

Member of the Uttar Pradesh Legislative Assembly
- Incumbent
- Assumed office 10 March 2022
- Preceded by: Sohil Akhtar Ansari
- Constituency: Kanpur Cantonment

Personal details
- Born: 15 November 1965 (age 60) Kanpur, Uttar Pradesh, India
- Party: Samajwadi Party
- Spouse: Farzana Hassan
- Children: 2
- Parents: Syed Mohammad Irfan (father); Seema Irfan (mother)

Mohammad Hassan Roomi (born 15 November 1965) is an Indian politician from Uttar Pradesh. He is serving as a Member of the Uttar Pradesh Legislative Assembly from the Kanpur Cantonment Assembly constituency representing the second largest party of Uttar Pradesh, Samajwadi Party since 10 March 2022.

== Early life and education ==
Mohammad Hassan Roomi was born to Syed Mohammad Irfan and Seema Irfan on 15 November 1965 in Kanpur, Uttar Pradesh.

Roomi is married to Farzana Hassan. They have a son and a daughter together.

Mohammad Hassan Roomi did Master of Arts in Economics from Kanpur University and LLB from DAV Law College, Kanpur.
