= Sharvee Chaturvedi =

Indian fashion photographer

- Born: 20 July 1985 (age 40)
- Occupations: Fashion photography Fine art photography Tarot reader
- Website: sharveechaturvedi.com

Sharvee Chaturvedi (born 20 July 1985) is an Indian fashion photographer, known for shooting Bollywood's first all-male calendar. She is often touted as Subhash Ghai's and Dabboo Ratnani's protégé.

== Biography ==
Born and brought up in Kanpur, Chaturvedi graduated in economics from St. Xavier's College, Mumbai. She finished her diploma in image production from the London College of Communication, University of Arts, London. Having learnt fine art photography under Girish Mistry's tutelage, Sharvee began her own career with portrait, fine art, lifestyle, and actor portfolios. She has also assisted celebrity photographer Dabboo Ratnani.

== Work ==
Chaturvedi shot her debut calendar photography album for the year 2015, featuring 12 Bollywood actors including Ali Fazal, Gulshan Devaiah, Varun Sharma, Shiv Panditt, Chandan Roy Sanyal, Satyajeet Dubey, Dhruv Ganesh, Sumit Suri, Inaamulhaq, Anil Mange, Jitin Gulati, and Anshuman Jha. The calendar was unveiled by Subhash Ghai. The theme of the calendar was 'Life in a Dot' and was titled 'Bollywood Tomorrow', as it showcased each actor's journey in Bollywood. It revolved around ideas of human emotions, spirituality, culture, hope, dreams and visions of tomorrow.

She plans to continue shooting annual calendars featuring more celebrities and creative themes.
