= S. M. Banerjee =

Indian politician and trade unionist

S.M. Banerjee (31 August 1919 – 26 December 1987) was an Indian politician, trade unionist and a sympathizer of Communist Party of India.

== Political career ==
S.M. Banerjee won Lok Sabha elections four times from Kanpur as an independent candidate supported by Communist Party of India (CPI). He won in 1957, 1962, 1967 and 1971 and was a member of Lok Sabha for twenty years. In 1977, he lost election from Kanpur and got only 5,035 votes.

He was a trade unionist and head of several labour unions in Kanpur. He took active part in Defence Workers strike in 1947; arrested and convicted for 3 months; took active part in 1955 in 80 days strike of Textile workers in Kanpur and remained in jail for 50 days; dismissed from service from H. & S. Factory, Kanpur after the strike on 27 January 1956; sent to jail again in connection with Lal Imli Workers' agitation in 1957; took active part in 1960 and also in 1968 Central Government strikes and was sent to jail; took active part during State Government Employees' strike in 1967 in U.P. and was sent to jail. He was a member of (1) All India Post & Telegraph Council, (2) Telephone Advisory Council, Kanpur, and (3) Divisional Northern Railway Council. He was president of (1) All India Defence Employees' Federation, (2) Government of India Press Workers' Federation, (3) All India Linemen and Class IV Union, (4) U.P., M.E.S. Workers Union, (5) Provident Fund Employees' Union, Kanpur, (6) Federation of P.T.I. Employees Union, and (7) Ordnance Equipment Factory Employees Union, Kanpur. He was vice president of All India Insurance Employees Union.

He was a member of the lower house of parliament, the Second Lok Sabha (1957–1962), Third Lok Sabha (1962–1967), Fourth Lok Sabha (1967–1970) and the Fifth Lok Sabha (1971–1977).

== Personal life ==
He was born at Ambala on 31 August 1919 to Mr. P.M. Banerjee. He studied at C. B. High School, Ambala Cantt. and Cambridge Academy, Banaras. He married Deepika Banerjee on 10 December 1945 and had one son. He died 26 December 1987 in New Delhi.
