= Neeraj Chaturvedi =

Indian politician

Neeraj Chaturvedi नीरज चतुर्वेदी

Ex. M. L. A., Uttar Pradesh
- Constituency: Generalganj

Personal details
- Born: 1 October 1952 (age 73) Kanpur (Uttar Pradesh)
- Party: Bharatiya Janata Party
- Spouse: Mangala Chaturvedi
- Children: Three Daughters
- Education: Graduate

Neeraj Chaturvedi is an Indian politician and a former member of Uttar Pradesh Legislative Assembly three times. He is an active member of the Bhartiya Janata Party. He represented Generalganj Constituency of Kanpur city in Uttar Pradesh legislative Assembly from 1991 to 2002. He is also a member of the executive committee of BJP Uttar Pradesh.
