= BNSD Inter College =

Intermediate college in Chunniganj, Kanpur, India

Coordinates: 26.4770°N 80.3373°E

Bishambhar Nath Sanatan Dharam Inter College is an intermediate college in Chunniganj, Kanpur, India. It educates students up to class XII. It was founded in 1939. The college provides education in Science, Commerce, Arts and other subjects. Amar Singh Chauhan is the principal and is in office from 1 April 2023.

It is named after Rai Bhadur Bishambhar Nath who was an industrialist, banner, freedom fighter and social worker. He devoted his life to the cause of national integration, and to the spread of the Gandhian way of life.

Rajiv L. Gupta, the Indian-American businessman, attended the College in the late 1950s when it was a middle and high school. In his self-published 2016 autobiography Gupta attributed his later confidence to his time at the school and said the teaching had impressed upon him the importance of structure.this is school for both girls and boys now

Ram Nath Kovind, 14th President of India is a former student. On the day of his swearing-in the College held a celebratory lunch. In February 2019 President Kovind attended a function at BNSD Shista Niketan to honour three of his former teachers at BNSD Inter College.

Other notable alumni include the film director, David Dhawan, mathematician Harish-Chandra and politician Salil Vishnoi.

In September 2022 a sports academy was opened at the College to train students in five activities, including badminton, table tennis and chess. It is reported to be the first such facility in the 113 non-government aided secondary schools in Kanpur.
