= Irfan Solanki =

Indian politician

Haji Irfan Solanki

Member of Uttar Pradesh Legislative Assembly
- In office 2012–2024
- Constituency: Sishamau Assembly constituency

Member of Uttar Pradesh Legislative Assembly
- In office 2007–2012
- Constituency: Arya Nagar Assembly constituency

Personal details
- Born: 5 June 1979 (age 47) Ajmer, Rajasthan, India
- Party: Samajwadi Party
- Spouse: Naseem Solanki
- Children: 3
- Parent: Haji Mushtaq Solanki (father)
- Education: Graduate

Haji Irfan Solanki (born 5 June 1979) is an Indian politician from Uttar Pradesh, affiliated with the Samajwadi Party. He was the member of the Uttar Pradesh Legislative Assembly from Sisamau Kanpur Nagar. He belongs to the Muslim Teli community.

== Incidents of hooliganism ==
In June 2011, Solanki along with 20 others, forced his way into the office of woman IAS officer Ritu Maheshwari. He was later arrested after a complaint was filed for misbehaving with her, and this led to his supporters clashing with the police in Kanpur. He later apologized.

In May 2012, he was travelling in a car with tinted glass windows in the front, which is illegal under a Supreme Court ruling. When stopped by the traffic police in Faridabad, his hoodlums attempted to beat up the police. At the time, the incident was called "major embarrassment to UP Chief Minister Akhilesh Yadav, who had promised to end the hooliganism" associated with the Samajwadi Party.

He was booked by session court of desecration of the Indian Flag after cutting a tricoloured cake in 2011. The case was dropped after the state government withdrew their plea in 2013.

== GSVM Medical College assault and strike ==
On 28 February 2014, Solanki and his bodyguards severely assaulted some junior doctors in Kanpur after a minor traffic accident near GSVM Medical College and the associated Hallett Hospital in Kanpur.

Since it was near their hostel, a large group of students came out, and Solanki fled to a nearby police station. His car was damaged by the students. Subsequently, more than a hundred Samajwadi Party musclemen or goondas (maintained by political parties for instigating violence) entered the hostel and started beating up students and professors. A large team of policemen led by SSP Yashashvi Yadav entered the campus without attempting to seek permission and allegedly manhandled principal Dr. Navneet Kumar by his collar. The police beat up the students severely and arrested 24 junior doctors and none of Solanki's men. Several students had multiple fractures, with at least one with life-threatening pelvic fracture while some were handicapped for life. The following morning, visuals "shattered laptops, damaged medical books, broken chairs and tables and shattered mirrors" pointed to "the terror unleashed by the cops."

The violence caused widespread anger in the medical community, and thousands of doctors across the state decided to strike, protesting the "high handedness" of the government. Medical colleges remained closed in Agra, Lucknow, Aligarh and other cities. Protests were held in AIIMS Delhi and other parts of India. The matter was unresolved for four days, during which several dozen patients died. Intensifying the crisis, three hundred medical faculty resigned from their posts, seeking the release of 24 student doctors.

The Indian Medical Association protested the "barbaric" police action and threatened a country-wide strike on 5 March. The IMA president, Aarti Lalchandani was threatened by police at her house and was charged with inciting unrest. Eventually, the Chief Minister Akhilesh Yadav met a delegation of doctors and appealed for calm, but no resolution could be reached since Solanki had not been arrested. Health services in all of Uttar Pradesh had been severely affected.

On 3 March, the 24 arrested students refused to appeal for bail until action was taken against the police SSP Yashashvi Yadav. Also, another 200 faculty members in the Medical College in Agra resigned. Talks between the doctors and health minister Ahmad Hasan failed. The stir caused closures of hospitals in Noida, near Delhi. The prestigious Sanjay Gandhi Postgraduate Institute of Medical Sciences in Lucknow was closed since 4 March, and all 800 beds were vacated.

As the strike continued, opposition parties declaimed the "goonda-raj" in the state and demanded Solanki's arrest. A protest march by the opposition Bharatiya Janata Party was dispersed by a police lathi charge. Party chief and Akhilesh Yadav's father, Mulayam Singh Yadav condemned the manner in which his party was running the government.

Five days into the conflict, the Indian Medical Association gave a deadline of 48 hours to the government for arresting Solanki and resolving the matter.

=== Judicial probe and withdrawal of strike ===
On 6 March, following a Public Interest Litigation, the Allahabad High Court ordered the UP Director-General of Police to probe the action of the police in the hostel raid, and that "he may proceed with disciplinary and departmental action against the police officers who are found to have erred". The court also ordered the State Government to transfer the top three police officers of Kanpur including SSP, Yashashvi Yadav, and also ordered an independent judicial probe by retired justice V.K. Mathur. However, the state government informed the court that they had already set up a one-person inquiry headed by retired justice RMS Chauhan, following which the court kept its order in abeyance.

The state government also invoked the Essential Services Maintenance Act against the striking doctors. At the same time, Mulayam Singh Yadav reassured the doctors that all allegations against Solanki and others would be looked at sympathetically.

Meanwhile, a First Information Report was filed against Irfan Solanki and others for the vicious attack on the medical students. He was charged with attempt to murder. Responding to the charges, Solanki held a press conference where he produced an old man. He claimed that this man was being beaten up ruthlessly by the junior doctors, and that he had merely stepped in to save him. At an earlier press conference, Solanki had worn a bandage and claimed that he himself had been beaten up and had to have six (or three) stitches on his head. However, a Zee News interviewer asked Solanki to show the stitches - and no stitches or hair removal could be shown. At the recent press conference also he had no bandages.

Following the legal developments and assurances, the doctors withdrew their strike. However, a group of junior doctors started a hunger strike, demanding action against Solanki.

== Conviction ==
In 2024, Solanki along with four others was convicted on charges of arson, assault and threatening to kill. Solanki was sentenced to seven years in prison. The victim, a widow named Nazir Fatima, accused Solanki and his brother of setting her house on fire to encroach on her land.
