= Shiv Narayan Tandon =

Indian politician

Shiv Narayan Tandon was an Indian National Congress politician. He was a member of the 1st Lok Sabha from Kanpur. He died on 26 December 1999. The flyover at Kanpur Cantonment is named in his honour.
