= Virendra Swarup =

Indian politician

Virendra Swarup डॉ. वीरेन्द्र स्वरूप

Chairman of Uttar Pradesh Legislative Council
- In office 15 March 1969 – 26 February 1980
- Preceded by: Darbari Lal Sharma
- Succeeded by: Nagendra Swarup

Member of Uttar Pradesh Legislative Council
- In office 6 May 1956 – 26 February 1980
- Preceded by: Brijendra Swarup
- Succeeded by: Jagendra Swarup
- Constituency: Kanpur

Personal details
- Born: 23 July 1923
- Died: 26 February 1980 (aged 56)
- Party: Independent

Virendra Swarup (25 July 1923 – 26 February 1980) was an educator and a former chairman of the Uttar Pradesh Legislative Council. He was elected four times as MLC from Kanpur division graduates constituency.

== Legacy ==
The Dr. Virendra Swarup Memorial Trust (VSMT) was established in 1989 in his memory. The Foundation is running 10+2 schools and several other institutions in Kanpur and nearby areas.The first school of the organisation was the ICSE H2 block VSEC in kanpur .It is closely associated with Dayanand Shiksha Sansthan, an organisation that manages more than 25 post-graduate and 10+2 colleges all over Uttar Pradesh and [Uttarakhand] .

== Sources ==
- Dr. Virendra Swarup Institute of Professional Studies
- Dr. Virendra Swarup Institute of Computer Studies
- Dayanand Academy of Management Studies
- Dr. Virendra Swarup Education Centre
- Dr. Virendra Swarup 21st Century
