= Naresh Chander Chaturvedi =

Indian politician

Member of Parliament, Lok Sabha
- In office 1984–1989
- Constituency: Kanpur

Personal details
- Born: 30 April 1928
- Died: 29 November 1999 (aged 71)
- Party: Indian National Congress
- Education: M.A
- Alma mater: Rani Durgavati Vishwavidyalaya

Naresh Chandra Chaturvedi (30 April 1928 – 29 November 1999) was an Indian writer, politician and poet, predominantly writing in Hindi language. He was born in Farrukhabad, Uttar Pradesh. He completed his M. A. in Hindi from the Jabalpur University.

Chaturvedi was the member of Indian National Congress, and was elected to the 8th Lok Sabha from the Kanpur constituency. He was the general secretary of All India Congress Committee. In 1999, he was the member of National Commission for SC and ST. Chaturvedi died in Kanpur on 29 November 1999, at the age of 71.
