= Bharat Punarnirman Dal =

Bharat Punarnirman Dal (Hindi: भारत पुनर्निर्माण दल) (English translation: India Re-construction League) is a nationally registered political party in India, founded by a group of graduates of the Indian Institutes of Technology, and others.

== Core values ==
The party states its core values as always putting the nation and national interest first, and a belief in equality among all Indians.

== Elections contested ==
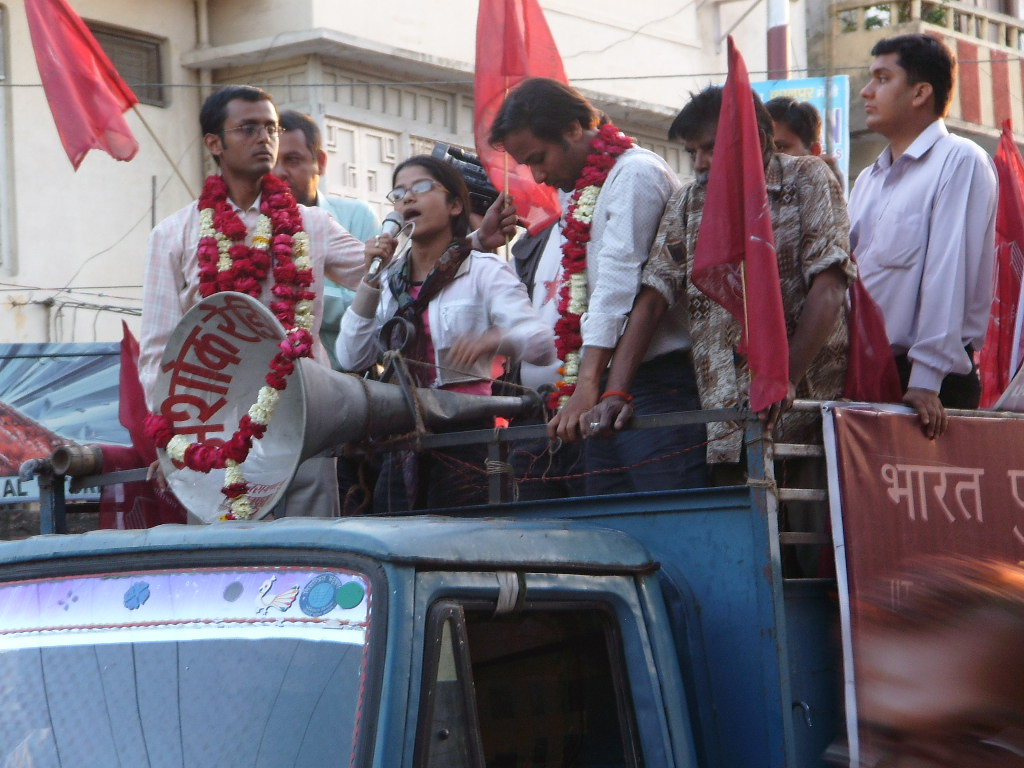
UP Election

The party contested civic elections in Maharashtra in February 2007 in four seats (1-Mumbai, 2-Thane, 1-Solapur), receiving around 250 votes in all. In Andhra Pradesh MLC elections in March 2007, the party supported three candidates, winning in two seats. In the Uttar Pradesh MLA polls in April–May 2007 the party fielded eight candidates on a party ticket and supported two others, attracting over 5,000 votes.

The candidates fielded by BPD for all elections were graduates with no criminal record, and the party's manifesto was based on good governance, accountability, transparency and efficiency. The results in Maharashtra and Uttar Pradesh did not yield any seats.

== Other party activities ==
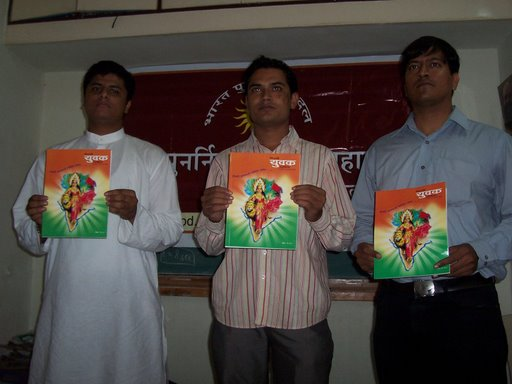

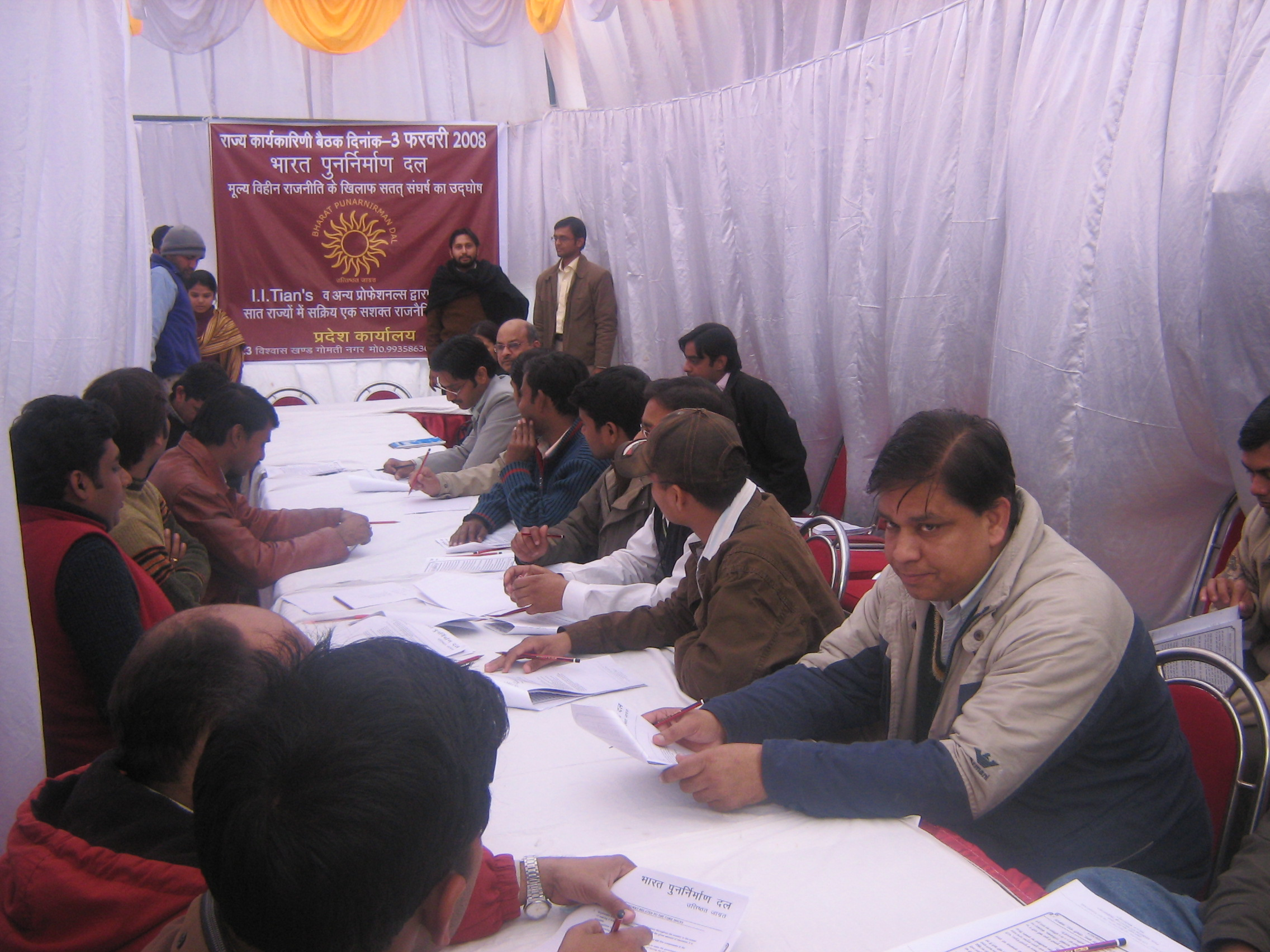

The party launched the Vijayi Yuvak Marathi Monthly Magazine in July 2007 in Maharashtra, with a circulation of 5000 magazines per month. An English Newspaper Sambharatam was launched in January 2008. A social wing under the name Sambharatam was launched at a national level to address student-related issues and other social issues.
