= Jagatvir Singh Drona =

Indian politician

Jagat Vir Singh Drona जगत वीर सिंह द्रोण

4th Mayor of Kanpur
- In office July 2012 – 1 December 2017
- Preceded by: Ravindra Patni
- Succeeded by: Pramila Pandey

Personal details
- Born: 23 July 1939 (age 87) Mathura district, United Provinces, British India
- Party: Bharatiya Janata Party
- Spouse: Renu Drona (m. 1969)
- Children: 4
- Education: B. Pe.

Military service
- Allegiance: India
- Branch/service: Indian Army
- Rank: Captain

Captain (Retd.) Pandit Jagat Vir Singh Drona (born 23 July 1939) is the former mayor of Kanpur and a former member of the 10th, 11th and 12th Lok Sabha. He belongs to the Bharatiya Janata Party. He served in the Indian army before joining politics in 1990.

== Positions held ==
- 1990–1992 President, Bharatiya Janata Party (B.J.P.), District. Kanpur
- 1991 Elected to 10th Lok Sabha
- 1991–1996 Member, Consultative Committee, Ministry of Steel
- 1993 Deputy Chief Whip, B.J.P. Parliamentary Party, Lok Sabha onwards
- 1993–1995 Member, Committee on Public Accounts
- 1993–1996 Member, Rules Committee
- 1994–1996 Member, Committee on Defence, Member, Committee on Steel
- 1996 Re-elected to 11th Lok Sabha (2nd term)
- 1996–1997 Member, Committee on Estimates; Member, Committee on Home Affairs; Member, Consultative Committee, Ministry of Defence
- 1997 Member, Joint Parliamentary Committee, Wakf Board
- 1998 Re-elected to 12th Lok Sabha (3rd term), Secretary, B.J.P. Parliamentary Party
- 1998–1999 Member, Committee on Transport and Tourism Member, Joint Committee on the Empowerment of Women and its Sub-Committee on Appraisal of Laws relating to Women - Criminal Laws Member, Consultative Committee, Ministry of Railways
- 2012–2017 Hon'ble Mayor of Kanpur
