= 2009 Indian general election in Uttar Pradesh =

2009 Lok Sabha elections in Uttar Pradesh

Indian general election in Uttar Pradesh, 2009
- April–May 2009

80 seats
- Turnout: 47.79%
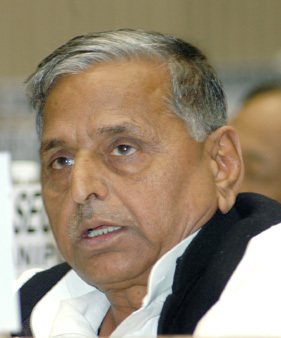

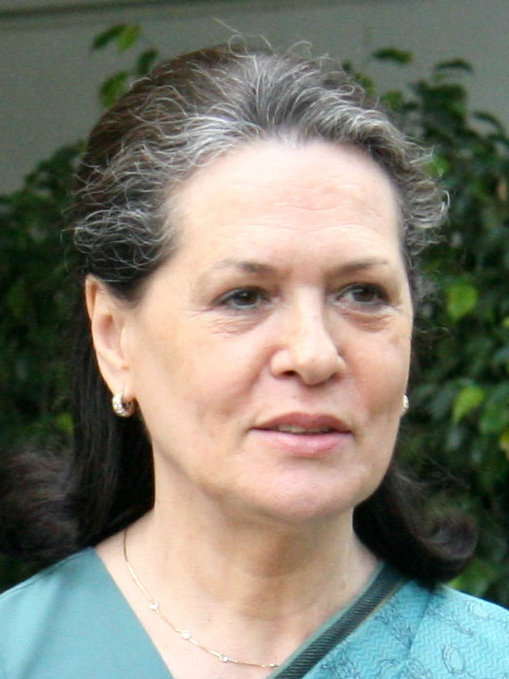

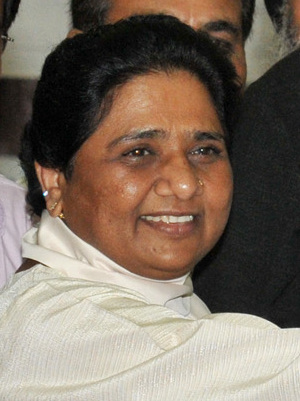

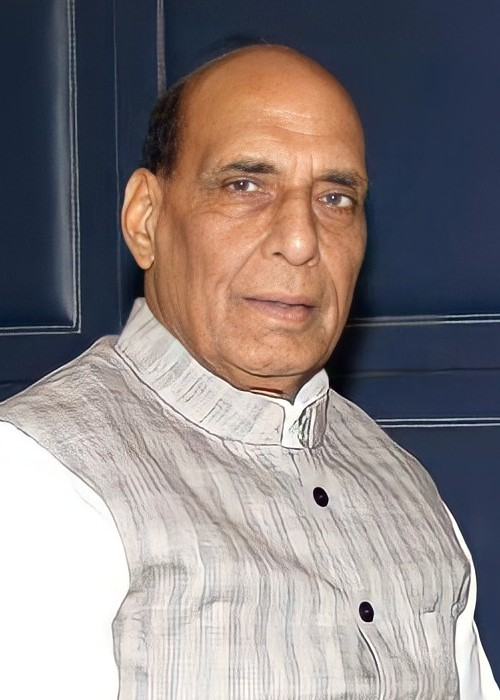

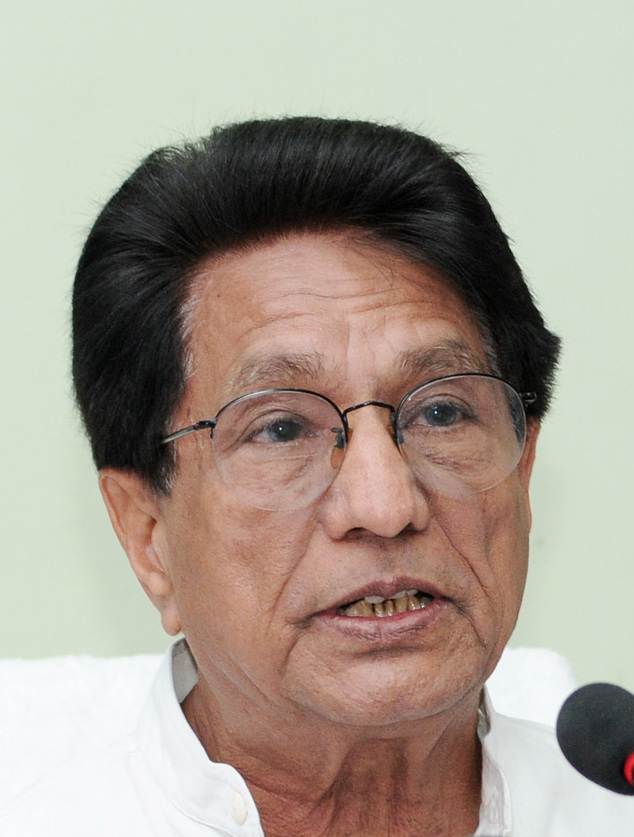
	First party	Second party	Third party
Leader	Mulayam Singh Yadav	Sonia Gandhi	Mayawati
Party	SP	INC	BSP
Alliance	Fourth Front	UPA	Third Front
Leader's seat	Mainpuri	Raebareli	Did not contest
Last election	35	9	19
Seats won	23	21	20
Seat change	▼12	▲12	▲1
Percentage	23.26%	18.25%	27.42%
Swing	▼3.48%	▲6.21%	▲2.75%
	Fourth party	Fifth party
Leader	Rajnath Singh	Ajit Singh
Party	BJP	RLD
Alliance	NDA	NDA
Leader's seat	Ghaziabad	Baghpat
Last election	10	3
Seats won	10	5
Seat change	Steady	▲2
Percentage	20.27%	5.74%
Swing	▼1.90%	▲1.25%
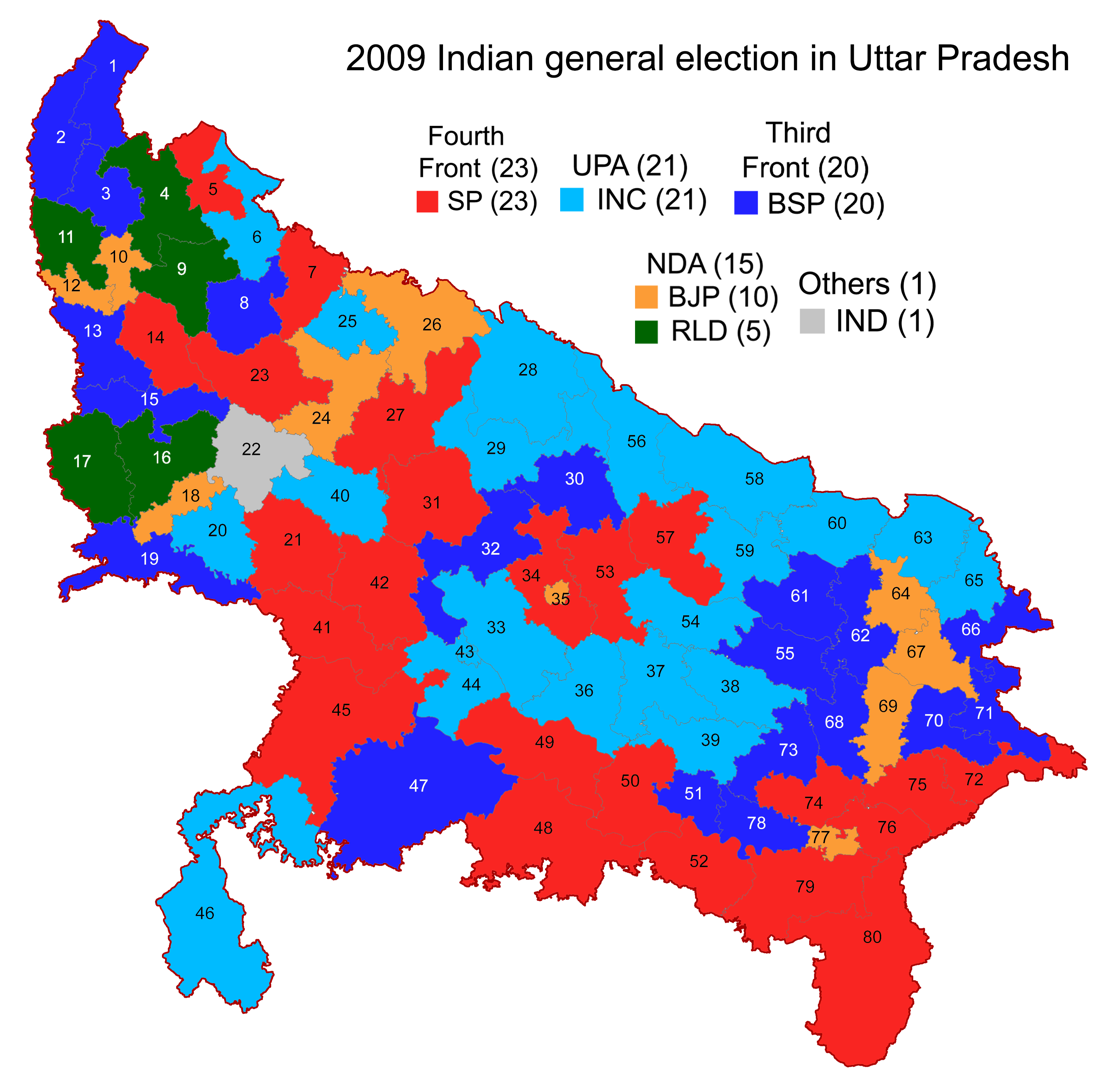
- 2009 Lok Sabha Uttar Pradesh Result Map
Prime Minister before election
Manmohan Singh
INC
Prime Minister after election
Manmohan Singh
INC

The 2009 Indian general election in Uttar Pradesh were held for 80 seats with the state going to polls across all the five phases of the general elections. The major contenders in the state were the National Democratic Alliance (NDA), Indian National Congress, Bahujan Samaj Party (BSP) and the Fourth Front. NDA consisted of the Bharatiya Janata Party (BJP) and Rashtriya Lok Dal whereas the fourth front consisted of the Samajwadi Party (SP), Rashtriya Janata Dal (RJD) and Lok Janshakti Party (LJP).

After counting on 16 May 2009, to everyone's surprise, national parties, Indian National Congress and Bharatiya Janata Party, did extremely well, while regional parties, Samajwadi Party and Bahujan Samaj Party, did worse than expected. The results showed a split between SP, BSP and INC, leading each of them winning a fair share of seats in the state. The campaigning by Rahul Gandhi proved to be very effective and his decision for Indian National Congress, to go alone in Uttar Pradesh, worked in their favour, since they ended up picking up 21 seats.

After the election, the success of the Bharatiya Janata Party, according to UP BJP leader was, the split of the Muslim votes away from SP to Congress, due to Kalyan Singh supporting the SP and the division of Dalit votes between BSP and Congress, led to success for BJP and its ally Rashtriya Lok Dal. This split also benefited Congress, since they were able bag many seats, that are usually won by either SP or BSP.

== Parties and alliances ==
=== Samajwadi Party+ ===
Samajwadi Party+
Party	Flag	Symbol	Leader	Seats
Samajwadi Party			Mulayam Singh Yadav	75
Independent politician			Kalyan Singh	1
Total				76

=== Bahujan Samaj Party ===
Party	Flag	Symbol	Leader	Seats contested
Bahujan Samaj Party			Mayawati	80

=== United Progressive Alliance ===
Party	Flag	Symbol	Leader	Seats contested
Indian National Congress			Sonia Gandhi	69
Mahan Dal			Keshav Dev Maurya	4
Rashtriya Swabhiman Party			R. K. Chaudhary	1

=== National Democratic Alliance ===
National Democratic Alliance
Party	Flag	Symbol	Leader	Seats
Bharatiya Janata Party			Rajnath Singh	71
Rashtriya Lok Dal			Ajit Singh	7
Janata Dal (United)			Nitish Kumar	2
Total				80

== List of Candidates ==
Constituency		UPA		NDA		BSP		SP	
#	Name	Party	Candidate	Party	Candidate	Party	Candidate	Party	Candidate
1	Saharanpur	INC	Gajay Singh	BJP	Jaswant Singh Saini	BSP	Jagdish Singh Rana	SP	Rasheed Masood
2	Kairana	INC	Surendra Kumar	BJP	Hukum Singh	BSP	Begum Tabassum	SP	Shajan Masood
3	Muzaffarnagar	INC	Harendra Singh Malik	RLD	Anuradha Choudhary	BSP	Kadir Rana	SP	Sangeet Singh Som
4	Bijnor	INC	S. Saiduzzaman	RLD	Sanjay Singh Chauhan	BSP	Shahid Siddiqui	SP	Yashvir Singh
5	Nagina	INC	Isham Singh	RLD	Munshiram Singh	BSP	Ram Kishan Singh	SP	Yashvir Singh
6	Moradabad	INC	Md. Azharuddin	BJP	Sarvesh Kumar Singh	BSP	Rajiv Channa	SP	Md. Rizwan
7	Rampur	INC	Noor Bano	BJP	Mukhtar Abbas Naqvi	BSP	Ghanshyam Lodhi	SP	Jaya Prada
8	Sambhal	INC	Chandra Vijay Singh	BJP	Chandra Pal Singh	BSP	Shafiqur Rahman Barq	SP	Iqbal Mehmood
9	Amroha	INC	Mohd. Nafis Abbasi	RLD	Devendra Nagpal	BSP	Mahmood Madani	SP	Mehboob Ali
10	Meerut	INC	Rajendra Sharma	BJP	Rajendra Agrawal	BSP	Malook Nagar	SP	Shahid Manzoor
11	Baghpat	INC	Sompal Shastri	RLD	Ajit Singh	BSP	Mukesh Sharma	SP	Sahab Singh
12	Ghaziabad	INC	Surendra Prakash Goel	BJP	Rajnath Singh	BSP	Pt. Amar Pal Sharma		
13	G. B. Nagar	INC	Ramesh Chand Tomar	BJP	Mahesh Kumar Sharma	BSP	Surendra Singh Nagar	SP	Narendra Bhati
14	Bulandshahr	INC	Devi Dayal	BJP	Ashok Kumar Pradhan	BSP	Raj Kumar Gautam	SP	Kamlesh
15	Aligarh	INC	Bijendra Singh	BJP	Sheela Gautam	BSP	Raj Kumari Chauhan	SP	Zafar Alam
16	Hathras	INC	Pradeep Chandel	RLD	Sarika Singh	BSP	Rajendra Kumar	SP	Anar Singh
17	Mathura	INC	Manvendra Singh	RLD	Jayant Chaudhary	BSP	Shyam Sunder Sharma		
18	Agra	INC	Prabhu Dayal Katheria	BJP	Dr. Ramshankar	BSP	Kunwar Chand Vakil	SP	Ramji Lal Suman
19	Fatehpur Sikri	INC	Raj Babbar	BJP	Raja Mahendra Singh	BSP	Seema Upadhyay	SP	Raghuraj Shakya
20	Firozabad	INC	Rajendrapal	BJP	Raghuvar Dayal Verma	BSP	S. P. Singh Baghel	SP	Akhilesh Yadav
21	Mainpuri	MD	Praveen Yadav	BJP	Tripti Shakya	BSP	Vinay Shakya	SP	Mulayam Singh Yadav
22	Etah	INC	Mahadeepak Shakya	BJP	Shyam Singh Shakya	BSP	Devendra Singh Yadav	IND	Kalyan Singh
23	Badaun	INC	Saleem Shervani	JD(U)	D. K. Bhardwaj	BSP	D. P. Yadav	SP	Dharmendra Yadav
24	Aonla	MD	Mehboob Ahmad Khan	BJP	Maneka Gandhi	BSP	Kunwar Sarvraj Singh	SP	Dharmendra Kumar
25	Bareilly	INC	Praveen Singh Aron	BJP	Santosh Gangwar	BSP	Islam Sabir Ansari	SP	Bhagwat Gangwar
26	Pilibhit	INC	V. M. Singh	BJP	Varun Gandhi	BSP	Ganga Charan	SP	Riyaz Ahmad
27	Shahjahanpur	INC	Umed Singh	BJP	Krishna Raj	BSP	Sunita Singh	SP	Mithlesh Kumar
28	Kheri	INC	Zafar Ali Naqvi	BJP	Ajay Kumar	BSP	Iliyas Azmi	SP	Ravi Prakash Verma
29	Dhaurahra	INC	Jitin Prasada	BJP	Raghvendra Singh	BSP	Rajesh Kumar Singh	SP	Om Prakash
30	Sitapur	INC	Ram Lal Rahi	BJP	Gyan Tiwari	BSP	Kaisar Jahan	SP	Mahendra Singh Verma
31	Hardoi			BJP	Purnima Verma	BSP	Ram Kumar Kuril	SP	Usha Verma
32	Misrikh	INC	Om Prakash	BJP	Anil Kumar Bhargav	BSP	Ashok Kumar Rawat	SP	Shyam Prakash
33	Unnao	INC	Annu Tandon	BJP	Ramesh Kumar Singh	BSP	Arun Shankar Shukla	SP	Deepak Kumar
34	Mohanlalganj	RSBP	R. K. Chaudhary	BJP	Ranjan Kr. Chaudhary	BSP	Jai Prakash	SP	Sushila Saroj
35	Lucknow	INC	Rita Bahuguna Joshi	BJP	Lalji Tandon	BSP	Akhilesh Das	SP	Nafisa Ali Sodhi
36	Rae Bareli	INC	Sonia Gandhi	BJP	R. B. Singh	BSP	R. S. Kushwaha		
37	Amethi	INC	Rahul Gandhi	BJP	Pradeep Kumar Singh	BSP	Asheesh Shukla		
38	Sultanpur	INC	Sanjaya Sinh	BJP	Surya Bhan Singh	BSP	Md. Tahir Khan	SP	Ashok Pandey
39	Pratapgarh	INC	Ratna Singh	BJP	Lakshmi Narain Pandey	BSP	Shivakant Ojha	SP	Akshay Pratap Singh
40	Farrukhabad	INC	Salman Khurshid	BJP	Mithlesh Kumari	BSP	Naresh Agrawal	SP	Chandra Bhushan
41	Etawah	MD	Shiv Ram Dohre	BJP	Kamlesh Verma	BSP	Gaurishanker	SP	Premdas Katheria
42	Kannauj	MD	Vijay Singh Chauhan	BJP	Subrat Pathak	BSP	Mahesh Chandra Verma	SP	Akhilesh Yadav
43	Kanpur	INC	Sriprakash Jaiswal	BJP	Satish Mahana	BSP	Sukhda Misra	SP	Surendra M. Agrawal
44	Akbarpur	INC	Raja Ram Pal	BJP	Arun Kumar Tiwari Baba	BSP	Anil Shukla Warsi	SP	Kamlesh Pathak
45	Jalaun	INC	Babu Ramadhin Ahirwar	BJP	Bhanu Pratap Verma	BSP	Tilak Chandra Ahirwar	SP	Ghanshyam Anuragi
46	Jhansi	INC	Pradeep Jain Aditya	BJP	Ravi Kishan	BSP	Ramesh Kumar Sharma	SP	Chandrapal Singh Yadav
47	Hamirpur	INC	Siddha Gopal Sahu	BJP	Preetam Singh Lodhi	BSP	Vijay Bahadur Singh	SP	Ashok Kumar Chandel
48	Banda	INC	Bhagawan Deen Garg	BJP	Amita Bajpai	BSP	Bhairon Prasad Mishra	SP	R. K. Singh Patel
49	Fatehpur	INC	Vibhakar Shastri	BJP	Radhe Shyam Gupta	BSP	Mahendra Nishad	SP	Rakesh Sachan
50	Kaushambi	INC	Ram Nihore Rakesh	BJP	Gautam Chaudhary	BSP	Girish Chandra Pasi	SP	Shailendra Kumar
51	Phulpur	INC	Dharmraj Patel	BJP	Karan Singh Patel	BSP	Kapil Muni Karwariya	SP	Shyama Charan Gupta
52	Allahabad	INC	Shyam Krishna Pandey	BJP	Yogesh Shukla	BSP	Ashok Kumar Bajpai	SP	Rewati Raman Singh
53	Barabanki	INC	P. L. Punia	BJP	Ram Naresh Rawat	BSP	Kamla Prasad	SP	Ram Sagar Rawat
54	Faizabad	INC	Nirmal Khatri	BJP	Lallu Singh	BSP	Bimlendra Pratap Misra	SP	Mitrasen Yadav
55	Ambedkar Nagar			BJP	Vinay Katiyar	BSP	Rakesh Pandey	SP	Shankhlal Majhi
56	Bahraich	INC	Kamal Kishor	BJP	Akshaybar Lal	BSP	Lal Mani Prasad	SP	Shabbeer Ahmad
57	Kaiserganj	INC	Mohd Aleem	BJP	Lalta Prasad Mishra	BSP	Surendra Nath Awasthi	SP	Brij Bhushan Singh
58	Shrawasti	INC	Vinay Kumar Vinnu	BJP	Satya Deo Singh	BSP	Rizvan Zaheer	SP	Rubab Saida
59	Gonda	INC	Beni Prasad Verma	BJP	Ram Pratap Singh	BSP	Kirti Vardhan Singh	SP	Vinod Singh
60	Domariyaganj	INC	Jagdambika Pal	BJP	Jai Pratap Singh	BSP	Mohd. Muqueem	SP	Mata Prasad Pandey
61	Basti	INC	Basant Chaudhary	BJP	Dr. Y. D. Singh	BSP	Arvind Kumar Chaudhary	SP	Raj Kishor Singh
62	Sant Kabir Nagar	INC	Fazley Mahamood	BJP	Sharad Tripathi	BSP	Bhishma Shankar Tiwari	SP	Bhal Chandra Yadav
63	Maharajganj	INC	Harsh Vardhan	BJP	Pankaj Chaudhary	BSP	Ganesh Shanker Pandey	SP	Ajeet Mani
64	Gorakhpur	INC	Lalchand Nishad	BJP	Yogi Adityanath	BSP	Vinay Shankar Tiwari	SP	Manoj Tiwari
65	Kushi Nagar	INC	Ratanjit P. N. Singh	BJP	Vijay Kumar Dubey	BSP	Swami Prasad Maurya	SP	Bramha Shanker Tripathi
66	Deoria	INC	Baleshwar Yadav	BJP	Prakash Mani Tripathi	BSP	Gorakh Prasad Jaiswal	SP	Mohan Singh
67	Bansgaon	INC	Mahaveer Prasad	BJP	Kamlesh Paswan	BSP	Shree Nath Ji	SP	Sharada Devi
68	Lalganj			BJP	Neelam Sonkar	BSP	Bali Ram	SP	Daroga Prasad Saroj
69	Azamgarh	INC	Santosh Kumar Singh	BJP	Ramakant Yadav	BSP	Akbar Ahmad Dumpy	SP	Durga Prasad Yadav
70	Ghosi	INC	Sudha Rai	BJP	Ram Iqbal	BSP	Dara Singh Chauhan	SP	Arshad Jamal Ansari
71	Salempur	INC	Bhola Pandey	JD(U)	Ravi Shankar Singh	BSP	Ramashankar Rajbhar	SP	Hari Kewal Prasad
72	Ballia			BJP	Manoj Sinha	BSP	Sangram Singh Yadav	SP	Neeraj Shekhar
73	Jaunpur			BJP	Seema	BSP	Dhananjay Singh	SP	Parasnath Yadav
74	Machhlishahr	INC	Raj Bahadur	BJP	Vidyasagar Sonkar	BSP	Kamla Kant Gautam	SP	Tufani Saroj
75	Ghazipur			BJP	Prabhunath	BSP	Afzal Ansari	SP	Radhe Mohan Singh
76	Chandauli	INC	Shailendra Kumar	BJP	Jawahar Lal Jaiswal	BSP	Kailashnath Yadav	SP	Ramkishun
77	Varanasi	INC	Rajesh Mishra	BJP	Murli Manohar Joshi	BSP	Mukhtar Ansari	SP	Ajay Rai
78	Bhadohi	INC	Suryamani Tiwari	BJP	Mahendra Nath Pandey	BSP	Gorakhnath	SP	Chhotelal Bind
79	Mirzapur	INC	Ramesh Dube	BJP	Anurag Singh	BSP	Anil Kumar Maurya	SP	Bal Kumar Patel
80	Robertsganj	INC	Ram Adhar Joseph	BJP	Ram Shakal	BSP	Ram Chandra Tyagi	SP	Pakaudi Lal Kol

== Voting and results ==
Vote Share
1. BSP (27.4%)
2. SP (23.2%)
3. INC (18.2%)
4. BJP (17.5%)
5. RLD (3.20%)
6. Other (10.5%)
Seat Share
1. SP (28.8%)
2. INC (26.2%)
3. BSP (25.0%)
4. BJP (12.5%)
5. RLD (6.25%)
6. Independent (1.25%)

Source: Election Commission of India

=== Results by alliance ===
Alliance/ Party		Popular vote			Seats		
Alliance/ Party		Votes	%	±pp	Contested	Won	+/−
BSP		1,51,91,044	27.42	▲2.75	80	20	▲9
SP+	SP	1,28,84,968	23.26	▼3.48	75	23	▼12
SP+	IND	2,75,717	0.50	Steady	1	1	Steady
SP+	Total	1,31,60,685	23.76	Steady	76	24	Steady
UPA	INC	1,01,13,521	18.25	▲6.21	69	21	▲12
UPA	MD	65,398	0.19	Steady	4	0	Steady
UPA	RSP	1,52,633	0.28	▲0.19	1 + 7	0	Steady
UPA	Total	1,03,31,552	18.72	Steady	74 + 7	21	Steady
NDA	BJP	96,95,904	17.50	▼4.67	71	10	Steady
NDA	RLD	18,11,986	3.27	▼1.22	7	5	▲2
NDA	JD(U)	1,63,691	0.30	▼0.50	2	0	▼1
NDA	Total	1,16,71,581	21.07	Steady	80	15	Steady
Others				Steady		0	Steady
IND						0	Steady
Total		5,54,07,107	100%	-	1,368	80	-

=== List of elected MPs ===
Note that almost all the constituencies here were seriously overhauled after the delimitation commission. Hence the results for 2009 reflect a different demographic distribution. The winner from 2004 has been reported if the constituency name is the same, but this may reflect a completely different basket of districts.

Sources: Winner 2009 data (first 3 columns): ECI website; Winner 2004 data from 14th Lok Sabha page; sometimes these MPs may have been elected in a later by-election. Margin is from .

- Mayawati (BSP); in the by-elections, the Akbarpur seat was lost to the BSP – it went to Shankhlal Majhi (SP),
- Mulayam Singh Yadav (SP), Mainpuri went to Dharmendra Yadav (SP), and
- Narendra Kushwaha (BSP), who was expelled for accepting bribes in the Operation Duryodhana scam – Mirzapur seat went to Ramesh Dube (BSP)..

Constituency		Winner				Runner Up				Margin	%
#	Name	Candidate	Party	Votes	%	Candidate	Party	Votes	%	Margin	%
1	Saharanpur	Jagdish Singh Rana	BSP	354,807	43.21	Rasheed Masood	SP	269,934	32.87	84,873	10.34
2	Kairana	Begum Tabassum Hasan	BSP	283,259	39.05	Hukum Singh	BJP	260,796	35.96	22,463	3.09
3	Muzaffarnagar	Kadir Rana	BSP	275,318	36.96	Anuradha Choudhary	RLD	254,720	34.19	20,598	2.77
4	Bijnor	Sanjay Singh Chauhan	RLD	244,587	34.57	Shahid Siddiqui	BSP	216,157	30.55	28,430	4.02
5	Nagina (SC)	Yashvir Singh	SP	234,815	36.49	Ram Kishan Singh	BSP	175,127	27.22	59,688	9.27
6	Moradabad	Mhd. Azharuddin	INC	301,283	39.59	Sarvesh Kumar Singh	BJP	252,176	33.14	49,107	6.45
7	Rampur	Jaya Prada	SP	230,724	38.06	Noor Bano	INC	199,793	32.96	30,931	5.10
8	Sambhal	Shafiqur Rahman Barq	BSP	207,422	30.42	Iqbal Mehmood	SP	193,958	28.44	13,464	1.98
9	Amroha	Devendra Nagpal	RLD	283,182	40.09	Mehboob Ali	SP	191,099	27.05	92,083	13.04
10	Meerut	Rajendra Agrawal	BJP	232,137	31.90	Malook Nagar	BSP	184,991	25.42	47,146	6.48
11	Baghpat	Ajit Singh	RLD	238,638	38.88	Mukesh Sharma	BSP	175,611	28.61	63,027	10.27
12	Ghaziabad	Rajnath Singh	BJP	359,637	43.34	Surendra Prakash Goel	INC	268,956	32.41	90,681	10.93
13	G. B. Nagar	Surendra Singh Nagar	BSP	245,613	33.24	Mahesh Kumar Sharma	BJP	229,709	31.08	15,904	2.16
14	Bulandshahr (SC)	Kamlesh Balmiki	SP	236,257	35.34	Ashok Kumar Pradhan	BJP	170,192	25.46	66,065	9.88
15	Aligarh	Raj Kumari Chauhan	BSP	193,444	27.95	Zafar Alam	SP	176,887	25.56	16,557	2.39
16	Hathras (SC)	Sarika Baghel	RLD	247,927	38.23	Rajendra Kumar	BSP	211,075	32.55	36,852	5.68
17	Mathura	Jayant Chaudhary	RLD	379,870	52.29	Shyam Sunder Sharma	BSP	210,257	28.94	169,613	23.35
18	Agra (SC)	Ram Shankar Katheria	BJP	203,697	31.48	Kunwar Chand Vakil	BSP	193,982	29.98	9,715	1.50
19	Fatehpur Sikri	Seema Upadhyay	BSP	209,466	30.19	Raj Babbar	INC	199,530	28.75	9,936	1.44
20	Firozabad	Akhilesh Yadav	SP	287,011	41.91	S. P. Singh Baghel	BSP	219,710	32.08	67,301	9.83
21	Mainpuri	Mulayam Singh Yadav	SP	392,308	56.44	Vinay Shakya	BSP	219,239	31.54	173,069	24.90
22	Etah	Kalyan Singh	IND	275,717	48.57	Devendra Singh Yadav	BSP	147,449	25.97	128,268	22.60
23	Badaun	Dharmendra Yadav	SP	233,744	31.70	Dharam Yadav	BSP	201,202	27.29	32,542	4.41
24	Aonla	Maneka Gandhi	BJP	216,503	30.73	Dharmendra Kumar	SP	208,822	29.64	7,681	1.09
25	Bareilly	Praveen Singh Aron	INC	220,976	31.31	Santosh Gangwar	BJP	211,638	29.99	9,338	1.32
26	Pilibhit	Varun Gandhi	BJP	419,539	50.09	V. M. Singh	INC	138,038	16.48	281,501	33.61
27	Shahjahanpur (SC)	Mithlesh Kumar	SP	257,033	32.43	Sunita Singh	BSP	186,454	23.53	70,579	8.90
28	Kheri	Zafar Ali Naqvi	INC	184,982	26.13	Iliyas Azmi	BSP	176,205	24.89	8,777	1.24
29	Dhaurahra	Jitin Prasada	INC	391,391	51.53	Rajesh Kumar Singh	BSP	206,882	27.24	184,509	24.29
30	Sitapur	Kaisar Jahan	BSP	241,106	34.20	Mahendra Singh Verma	SP	221,474	31.42	19,632	2.78
31	Hardoi (SC)	Usha Verma	SP	294,030	51.17	Ram Kumar Kuril	BSP	201,095	35.00	92,935	16.17
32	Misrikh (SC)	Ashok Kumar Rawat	BSP	207,627	34.17	Shyam Prakash	SP	184,335	30.34	23,292	3.83
33	Unnao	Annu Tandon	INC	475,476	52.57	Arun Shankar Shukla	BSP	173,384	19.17	302,092	33.40
34	Mohanlalganj (SC)	Sushila Saroj	SP	256,367	36.93	Jai Prakash	BSP	179,772	25.89	76,595	11.04
35	Lucknow	Lalji Tandon	BJP	204,028	34.93	Rita Joshi	INC	163,127	27.93	40,901	7.00
36	Rae Bareli	Sonia Gandhi	INC	481,490	72.23	R. S. Kushwaha	BSP	109,325	16.40	372,165	55.83
37	Amethi	Rahul Gandhi	INC	464,195	71.78	Asheesh Shukla	BSP	93,997	14.54	370,198	57.24
38	Sultanpur	Sanjaya Sinh	INC	300,411	42.44	Mhd. Tahir Khan	BSP	201,632	28.48	98,779	13.96
39	Pratapgarh	Ratna Singh	INC	169,137	26.39	Shivakant Ojha	BSP	139,358	21.74	29,779	4.65
40	Farrukhabad	Salman Khurshid	INC	169,351	27.72	Naresh Agrawal	BSP	142,152	23.26	27,199	4.46
41	Etawah (SC)	Premdas Katheria	SP	278,776	43.70	Gaurishanker	BSP	232,030	36.37	46,746	7.33
42	Kannauj	Akhilesh Yadav	SP	337,751	45.52	Mahesh Chandra Verma	BSP	221,887	29.91	115,864	15.61
43	Kanpur	Sriprakash Jaiswal	INC	214,988	41.92	Satish Mahana	BJP	196,082	38.23	18,906	3.69
44	Akbarpur	Raja Ram Pal	INC	192,549	30.22	Anil Shukla Warsi	BSP	160,506	25.19	32,043	5.03
45	Jalaun (SC)	Ghanshyam Anuragi	SP	283,023	35.49	Tilak Chandra Ahirwar	BSP	271,614	34.05	11,409	1.44
46	Jhansi	Pradeep Jain Aditya	INC	252,712	29.32	Ramesh Kumar Sharma	BSP	205,042	23.79	47,670	5.53
47	Hamirpur	Vijay Bahadur Singh	BSP	199,143	27.45	Siddha Gopal Sahu	INC	173,641	23.93	25,502	3.52
48	Banda	R. K. Singh Patel	SP	240,948	38.91	Bhairon Prasad Mishra	BSP	206,355	33.33	34,593	5.58
49	Fatehpur	Rakesh Sachan	SP	218,953	31.53	Mahendra Prasad Nishad	BSP	166,725	24.01	52,228	7.52
50	Kaushambi (SC)	Shailendra Kumar Pasi	SP	246,501	44.71	Girish Chandra Pasi	BSP	190,712	34.59	55,789	10.12
51	Phulpur	Kapil Muni Karwariya	BSP	167,542	30.36	Shyama Charan Gupta	SP	152,964	27.72	14,578	2.64
52	Allahabad	Rewati Raman Singh	SP	209,431	38.06	Ashok Kumar Bajpai	BSP	174,511	31.72	34,920	6.34
53	Barabanki (SC)	P. L. Punia	INC	328,418	44.18	Ram Sagar	SP	160,505	21.59	167,913	22.59
54	Faizabad	Nirmal Khatri	INC	211,543	28.24	Mitrasen Yadav	SP	157,315	21.00	54,228	7.24
55	Ambedkar Nagar	Rakesh Pandey	BSP	259,487	32.00	Shankhlal Majhi	SP	236,751	29.20	22,736	2.80
56	Bahraich (SC)	Kamal Kishor	INC	160,005	31.21	Lal Mani Prasad	BSP	121,052	23.61	38,953	7.60
57	Kaiserganj	Brij Bhushan Singh	SP	196,063	34.66	Surendra Nath Awasthi	BSP	123,864	21.90	72,199	12.76
58	Shrawasti	Vinay Kumar Pandey	INC	201,556	33.29	Rizwan Zaheer	BSP	159,527	26.35	42,029	6.94
59	Gonda	Beni Prasad Verma	INC	155,675	25.72	Kirti Vardhan Singh	BSP	132,000	21.81	23,675	3.91
60	Domariyaganj	Jagdambika Pal	INC	229,872	31.24	Jai Pratap Singh	BJP	153,306	20.83	76,566	10.41
61	Basti	Arvind Kumar Chaudhary	BSP	268,666	34.72	Raj Kishor Singh	SP	163,456	21.12	105,210	13.60
62	Sant Kabir Nagar	Bhishma Tiwari	BSP	211,043	26.35	Sharad Tripathi	BJP	181,547	22.67	29,496	3.68
63	Maharajganj	Harsh Vardhan	INC	305,474	36.40	Ganesh Shanker Pandey	BSP	181,846	21.67	123,628	14.73
64	Gorakhpur	Yogi Adityanath	BJP	403,156	53.85	Vinay Shankar Tiwari	BSP	182,885	24.43	220,271	29.42
65	Kushi Nagar	Ratanjit Pratap Singh	INC	223,954	30.63	Swami Prasad Maurya	BSP	202,860	27.75	21,094	2.88
66	Deoria	Gorakh Prasad Jaiswal	BSP	219,889	30.73	Prakash Mani Tripathi	BJP	178,110	24.89	41,779	5.84
67	Bansgaon (SC)	Kamlesh Paswan	BJP	223,011	34.35	Shree Nath Ji	BSP	170,224	26.22	52,787	8.13
68	Lalganj (SC)	Bali Ram	BSP	207,998	31.59	Neelam Sonkar	BJP	168,050	25.52	39,948	6.07
69	Azamgarh	Ramakant Yadav	BJP	247,648	35.13	Akbar Ahmad Dumpy	BSP	198,609	28.18	49,039	6.95
70	Ghosi	Dara Singh Chauhan	BSP	220,695	28.82	Arshad J. Ansari	SP	159,750	20.86	60,945	7.96
71	Salempur	Ramashankar Rajbhar	BSP	175,088	27.54	Bhola Pandey	INC	156,783	24.66	18,305	2.88
72	Ballia	Neeraj Shekhar	SP	276,649	40.82	Sangram Singh	BSP	204,094	30.11	72,555	10.71
73	Jaunpur	Dhananjay Singh	BSP	302,618	39.61	Parasnath Yadav	SP	222,267	29.10	80,351	10.51
74	Machhlishahr (SC)	Tufani Saroj	SP	223,152	31.09	Kamla Kant Gautam	BSP	198,846	27.70	24,306	3.39
75	Ghazipur	Radhe Mohan Singh	SP	379,233	49.22	Afzal Ansari	BSP	309,924	40.23	69,309	8.99
76	Chandauli	Ramkishun	SP	180,114	26.85	Kailash Nath Singh	BSP	179,655	26.78	459	0.07
77	Varanasi	Murli Manohar Joshi	BJP	203,122	30.52	Mukhtar Ansari	BSP	185,911	27.94	17,211	2.58
78	Bhadohi	Gorakh Nath Pandey	BSP	195,808	29.73	Chhotelal Bind	SP	182,845	27.76	12,963	1.97
79	Mirzapur	Bal Kumar Patel	SP	218,898	29.87	Anil Kumar Maurya	BSP	199,216	27.18	19,682	2.69
80	Robertsganj (SC)	Pakaudi Lal Kol	SP	216,478	36.36	Ram Chandra Tyagi	BSP	166,219	27.92	50,259	8.44

== Post-election Union Council of Ministers from Uttar Pradesh ==
#	Name	Constituency	Designation	Department	From	To	Party
1	Ajit Singh	Baghpat	Cabinet Minister	Civil Aviation	18 Dec 2011	26 May 2014	RLD
2	Beni Prasad Verma	Gonda	MoS(I/C)	Steel	19 Jan 2011	12 July 2011	INC
2	Beni Prasad Verma	Gonda	Cabinet Minister	Steel	12 July 2011	26 May 2014	INC
3	Salman Khursheed	Farrukhabad	MoS(I/C)	Corporate Affairs; Minority Affairs	28 May 2009	19 Jan 2011	INC
3	Salman Khursheed	Farrukhabad	Cabinet Minister	Water Resources	19 Jan 2011	12 July 2011	INC
3	Salman Khursheed	Farrukhabad	Cabinet Minister	Minority Affairs	19 Jan 2011	28 Oct 2012	INC
3	Salman Khursheed	Farrukhabad	Cabinet Minister	Law and Justice	12 July 2011	28 Oct 2012	INC
3	Salman Khursheed	Farrukhabad	Cabinet Minister	External Affairs	28 Oct 2012	26 May 2014	INC
4	Shriprakash Jaiswal	Kanpur	MoS(I/C)	Coal; Statistics and Programme Implementation	28 May 2009	19 Jan 2011	INC
4	Shriprakash Jaiswal	Kanpur	Cabinet Minister	Coal	19 Jan 2011	26 May 2014	INC
5	Jitin Prasada	haurahra	MoS	Petroleum and Natural Gas	28 May 2009	19 Jan 2011	INC
5	Jitin Prasada	haurahra	MoS	Road Transport and Highways	19 Jan 2011	28 Oct 2012	INC
5	Jitin Prasada	haurahra	MoS	Human Resource Development	28 Oct 2012	26 May 2014	INC
5	Jitin Prasada	haurahra	MoS	Defence	28 Oct 2012	29 Oct 2012	INC
6	R. P. N. Singh	Kushi Nagar	MoS	Road Transport and Highways	28 May 2009	19 Jan 2011	INC
6	R. P. N. Singh	Kushi Nagar	MoS	Petroleum and Natural Gas	19 Jan 2011	28 Oct 2012	INC
6	R. P. N. Singh	Kushi Nagar	MoS	Corporate Affairs	19 Jan 2011	28 Oct 2012	INC
6	R. P. N. Singh	Kushi Nagar	MoS	Home Affairs	28 Oct 2012	26 May 2014	INC
7	Pradeep Jain Aditya	Jhansi	MoS	Rural Development	28 May 2009	26 May 2014	INC

== Assembly segments-wise lead of parties ==
Party	Assembly segments	Position in Assembly (as of 2012 election)
Samajwadi Party	118	224
Bahujan Samaj Party	100	80
Indian National Congress	95	28
Bharatiya Janata Party	62	47
Rashtriya Lok Dal	21	9
Peace Party of India	1	4
Rashtriya Swabhimaan Party	1	0
Others	5	11
Total	403	
