= Ram Singh Shakya =

Indian politician

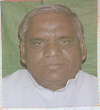

Member of Parliament, Lok Sabha
- In office 1996-1998
- Preceded by: Kanshi Ram
- Succeeded by: Sukhda Misra
- In office 1989-1991
- Preceded by: Raghuraj Singh Chaudhary
- Succeeded by: Kanshi Ram
- In office 1980-1984
- Preceded by: Arjun Singh Bhadoria
- Succeeded by: Raghuraj Singh Chaudhary
- Constituency: Etawah, Uttar Pradesh

Personal details
- Party: Janata Dal
- Other political affiliations: Samajwadi Party
- Spouse: Mahadevi Shakya
- Education: K.K. Degree College Etawah

Ram Singh Shakya is an Indian politician. He was elected to the Lok Sabha, the lower house of the Parliament of India from Etawah, Uttar Pradesh.
