= Etawah Assembly constituency =

Constituency of the Uttar Pradesh legislative assembly in India

Coordinates: 26.79°N 79.02°E

Etawah
- Constituency No. 200 for the Uttar Pradesh Legislative Assembly

Constituency details
- Country: India
- Region: North India
- State: Uttar Pradesh
- District: Etawah
- Total electors: 4,06,509
- Reservation: None

Member of Legislative Assembly
- 18th Uttar Pradesh Legislative Assembly
- Incumbent Sarita Bhadauria
- Party: Bharatiya Janta Party
- Elected year: 2022

Etawah is a constituency of the Uttar Pradesh Legislative Assembly covering the city of Etawah in the Etawah district of Uttar Pradesh, India.

Etawah is one of five assembly constituencies in the Etawah Lok Sabha constituency. Since 2008, this assembly constituency is numbered 200 amongst 403 constituencies.

== Members of the Legislative Assembly ==
Year	Member	Party
1952	Gopinath Dixit	Indian National Congress
1957	Bhuwanesh Bhushan	Bharatiya Jana Sangh
1962	Hoti Lal Agarwal	Indian National Congress
1967	Bhuwanesh Bhushan	Bharatiya Jana Sangh
1969	Hoti Lal Agarwal	Indian National Congress
1974	Sukhda Misra	Indian National Congress
1977	Satydeo Tripathi	Janata Party
1980	Sukhda Misra	Indian National Congress (I)
1985	Sukhda Misra	Indian National Congress
1989	Sukhda Misra	Janata Dal
1991	Ashok Dubey	Bharatiya Janata Party
1993	Jaiveer Singh Bhadauria	Samajwadi Party
1996	Jaiveer Singh Bhadauria	Bharatiya Janata Party
2002	Mahendra Singh Rajput	Samajwadi Party
2007	Mahendra Singh Rajput	Samajwadi Party
2009^	Mahendra Singh Rajput	Bahujan Samaj Party
2012	Raghuraj Singh Shakya	Samajwadi Party
2017	Sarita Bhadauria	Bharatiya Janata Party
2022	Sarita Bhadauria	Bharatiya Janata Party

== Election results ==
=== 2022 ===
2022 Uttar Pradesh Legislative Assembly election: Etawah
Party	Candidate	Votes	%	±%
BJP	Sarita Bhadauria	98,150	39.97	▼1.31
SP	Sarvesh Kumar Shakya	94,166	38.35	▲4.91
BSP	Kuldeep Gupta	46,525	18.95	▼0.77
NOTA	None of the above	1,186	0.48	▲0.21
Majority		3,984	1.62	▼6.22
Turnout		245,542	60.4	▲2.5
BJP hold		Swing		

2017 Uttar Pradesh Legislative Assembly election: Etawah
Party	Candidate	Votes	%	±%
BJP	Sarita Bhadauria	91,234	41.28	
SP	Kuldeep Gupta	73,892	33.44	
BSP	Narendra Nath Chaturvedi	43,577	19.72	
NOTA	None of the above	594	0.27	
Majority		17,342	7.84	
Turnout		220,994	57.9	
