= Raghuraj Singh Shakya =

Indian politician

Member of Uttar Pradesh Legislative Assembly
- In office 2012–2017
- Preceded by: Mahendra Singh Rajput
- Succeeded by: Sarita Bhadauria
- Constituency: Etawah

Member of Parliament, Lok Sabha
- In office 1999–2009
- Preceded by: Sukhda Misra
- Succeeded by: Premdas Katheria
- Constituency: Etawah

Personal details
- Born: 1 July 1968 (age 57) Etawah, Uttar Pradesh, India
- Party: Bharatiya Janata Party
- Spouse: Seema Singh Shakya
- Children: Piyush Raj Shakya; Ayush Raj Shakya

Raghuraj Singh Shakya (born 1 July 1968) is an Indian politician from Uttar Pradesh. He is a former member of the Uttar Pradesh Legislative Assembly and has also served as a member of the Lok Sabha representing the Etawah constituency.

== Political career ==
Shakya was elected to the 16th Legislative Assembly of Uttar Pradesh in 2012 from the Etawah constituency as a candidate of the Samajwadi Party. He defeated Bahujan Samaj Party candidate Mahendra Singh Rajput by a margin of 6,264 votes.

He later joined the Bharatiya Janata Party on 7 February 2022.

== Positions held ==
From	To	Position
1999	2009	Member of Lok Sabha (Etawah)
2012	2017	Member of Uttar Pradesh Legislative Assembly
