= Ashok Kumar Doharey =

Indian politician

Member of the India Parliament for Etawah
- In office 1 September 2014 – 23 May 2019
- Preceded by: Premdas Katheria
- Succeeded by: Ram Shankar Katheria
- Constituency: Etawah

Personal details
- Born: 23 September 1970 (age 56) Rampura, Uttar Pradesh
- Party: Indian National Congress
- Other political affiliations: Bharatiya Janata Party
- Spouse: Shashibala Dohrey
- Children: 4
- Education: KK Mahavidyalaya
- Occupation: Agriculturist
- As of 17 December, 2016

Ashok Kumar Dohre (born 23 September 1970) is a member of the Indian National Congress and has won the 2014 Indian general elections from the Etawah (Lok Sabha constituency) and former cabinet minister in U.P. Government.
