= Jitendra Kumar Dohare =

Indian politician

Member of Parliament, Lok Sabha
- Incumbent
- Assumed office 2024
- Preceded by: Ram Shankar Katheria
- Constituency: Etawah

Personal details
- Party: Samajwadi Party
- Occupation: Politician

Jitendra Kumar Dohare is an Indian politician and a member of the Lok Sabha from the Etawah Lok Sabha constituency. He is a member of the Samajwadi Party. In the 2024 general election of India, he defended Ram Shankar Katheria of the Bhartiya Janta Party by 58412 votes.

== See also ==
- Samajwadi Party
- 2024 Indian general election
- Etawah Lok Sabha constituency
