= List of members of the 15th Lok Sabha =

Members of Lok Sabha (2009-14)

This is a list of members of the 15th Lok Sabha (2009–2014), arranged by state or territory represented. These members of the lower house of the Indian Parliament were elected at the 2009 Indian general election held in April–May 2009.

== Andhra Pradesh ==
Keys: INC (30) TDP (6) YSRCP (2) TRS (2) AIMIM (1) Vacant (1)

No.	Constituency	Member of Parliament	Party affiliation	Roles and responsibilities
1	Adilabad (ST)	Ramesh Rathod	Telugu Desam Party	
2	Peddapalle (SC)	Gaddam Vivek Venkatswamy	Indian National Congress	
3	Karimnagar	Ponnam Prabhakar	Indian National Congress	
4	Nizamabad	Madhu Goud Yaskhi	Indian National Congress	
5	Zahirabad	Suresh Shetkar	Indian National Congress	
6	Medak	Vijayashanti	Telangana Rashtra Samithi	
7	Malkajgiri	Sarvey Sathyanarayana	Indian National Congress	Minister of State, Road Transport and Highways (2012–2014)
8	Secunderabad	M. Anjan Kumar Yadav	Indian National Congress	
9	Hyderabad	Asaduddin Owaisi	All India Majlis-E-Ittehadul Muslimeen	Lok Sabha Leader, All India Majlis-E-Ittehadul Muslimeen
10	Chevella	S. Jaipal Reddy	Indian National Congress	Cabinet Minister, Urban Development (2009–2011), Cabinet Minister, Petroleum and Natural Gas (2011–2012), Cabinet Minister, Science and Technology, Earth Sciences (2012–2014)
11	Mahbubnagar	K. Chandrashekar Rao	Telangana Rashtra Samithi	Lok Sabha Leader, Telangana Rashtra Samithi
12	Nagarkurnool (SC)	Manda Jagannath	Indian National Congress	
13	Nalgonda	Gutha Sukender Reddy	Indian National Congress	
14	Bhongir	Komatireddy Raj Gopal Reddy	Indian National Congress	
15	Warangal (SC)	Rajaiah Siricilla	Indian National Congress	
16	Mahabubabad (ST)	Porika Balram Naik	Indian National Congress	Minister of State, Social Justice and Empowerment (2012–2014)
17	Khammam	Nama Nageswara Rao	Telugu Desam Party	Lok Sabha Leader, Telugu Desam Party
18	Araku (ST)	Kishore Chandra Deo	Indian National Congress	Chairman, Committee on Public Undertakings (2009–2011), Cabinet Minister, Tribal Affairs and Panchayati Raj (2011–2014)
19	Srikakulam	Killi Krupa Rani	Indian National Congress	Minister of State, Communications and Information Technology (2012–2014)
20	Vizianagaram	Botsa Jhansi Lakshmi	Indian National Congress	
21	Visakhapatnam	Daggubati Purandeswari	Indian National Congress	Minister of State, Human Resource Development (2009–2012), Minister of State, Commerce and Industry (2012–2014)
22	Anakapalli	Sabbam Hari	Indian National Congress	
23	Kakinada	M. M. Pallam Raju	Indian National Congress	Minister of State, Defence (2009 – 2012), Cabinet Minister, Human Resource Development (2012–2014)
24	Amalapuram (SC)	G. V. Harsha Kumar	Indian National Congress	
25	Rajahmundry	Aruna Kumar Vundavalli	Indian National Congress	
26	Narasapuram	Kanumuri Bapiraju	Indian National Congress	
27	Eluru	Kavuri Sambasiva Rao	Indian National Congress	Cabinet Minister, Textiles (2013–2014)
28	Machilipatnam	Konakalla Narayana Rao	Indian National Congress	
29	Vijayawada	Lagadapati Rajagopal (resigned on 19 February 2014)	Indian National Congress	
29	Vijayawada	Vacant from 19 February 2014		
30	Guntur	Sambasiva Rayapati Rao	Indian National Congress	
31	Narasaraopet	Modugula Venugopala Reddy	Telugu Desam Party	
32	Bapatla (SC)	Panabaka Lakshmi	Indian National Congress	Minister of State, Textiles (2009–2012), Minister of State, Petroleum and Natural Gas (2012–2014)
33	Ongole	Magunta Sreenivasulu Reddy	Indian National Congress	
34	Nandyal	S. P. Y. Reddy	Indian National Congress	
35	Kurnool	Kotla Jayasurya Prakasha Reddy	Indian National Congress	Minister of State, Railways (2012–2014)
36	Anantapur	Anantha Venkatarami Reddy	Indian National Congress	
37	Hindupur	Kristappa Nimmala	Telugu Desam Party	
38	Kadapa	Y. S. Jagan Mohan Reddy (resigned on 29 November 2010)	Indian National Congress	
38	Kadapa	Y. S. Jagan Mohan Reddy (elected on 13 May 2011)	YSR Congress Party	Lok Sabha Leader, YSR Congress Party
39	Nellore	Mekapati Rajamohan Reddy (resigned on 28 February 2012)	Indian National Congress	
39	Nellore	Mekapati Rajamohan Reddy (elected on 15 June 2012)	YSR Congress Party	
40	Tirupati (SC)	Chinta Mohan	Indian National Congress	
41	Rajampet	Sai Prathap Annayyagari	Indian National Congress	Minister of State, Steel (2009–2011), Minister of State, Heavy Industries and Public Enterprises (2011)
42	Chittoor (SC)	Naramalli Sivaprasad	Telugu Desam Party	

== Arunachal Pradesh ==
Keys: INC (2)

No.	Constituency	Member of Parliament	Party affiliation	Roles and responsibilities
1	Arunachal East	Ninong Ering	Indian National Congress	Minister of State, Minority Affairs (2012–2014)
2	Arunachal West	Takam Sanjoy	Indian National Congress	

== Assam ==
Keys: INC (7) BJP (4) AGP (1) AIUDF (1) BPF (1)

No.	Constituency	Member of Parliament	Party affiliation	Roles and responsibilities
1	Karimganj (SC)	Lalit Mohan Suklabaidya	Indian National Congress	
2	Silchar	Kabindra Purkayastha	Bharatiya Janata Party	
3	Autonomous District (ST)	Biren Singh Engti	Indian National Congress	
4	Dhubri	Badruddin Ajmal	All India United Democratic Front	Lok Sabha Leader, All India United Democratic Front
5	Kokrajhar (ST)	Sansuma Khunggur Bwiswmuthiary	Bodoland People's Front	Lok Sabha Leader, Bodoland People's Front
6	Barpeta	Ismail Hussain	Indian National Congress	
7	Gauhati	Bijoya Chakravarty	Bharatiya Janata Party	
8	Mangaldoi	Ramen Deka	Bharatiya Janata Party	
9	Tezpur	Joseph Toppo	Asom Gana Parishad	Lok Sabha Leader, Asom Gana Parishad
10	Nowgong	Rajen Gohain	Bharatiya Janata Party	
11	Kaliabor	Dip Gogoi	Indian National Congress	
12	Jorhat	Bijoy Krishna Handique	Indian National Congress	Cabinet Minister, Mines and Development of North Eastern Region (2009–2011)
13	Dibrugarh	Paban Singh Ghatowar	Indian National Congress	Minister of State (I/C), Development of North Eastern Region (2011–2014), Minister of State, Parliamentary Affairs (2011–2012)
14	Lakhimpur	Ranee Narah	Indian National Congress	Minister of State, Tribal Affairs (2012–2014)

== Bihar ==
Keys: JD(U) (19) BJP (12) RJD (3) INC (2) Independent (2) Vacant (2)

No.	Constituency	Member of Parliament	Party affiliation	Roles and responsibilities
1	Valmiki Nagar	Baidyanath Prasad Mahto	Janata Dal	
2	Paschim Champaran	Sanjay Jaiswal	Bharatiya Janata Party	
3	Purvi Champaran	Radha Mohan Singh	Bharatiya Janata Party	
4	Sheohar	Rama Devi	Bharatiya Janata Party	
5	Sitamarhi	Arjun Roy	Janata Dal	
6	Madhubani	Hukmdev Narayan Yadav	Bharatiya Janata Party	
7	Jhanjharpur	Mangani Lal Mandal	Janata Dal	
8	Supaul	Vishwa Mohan Kumar	Janata Dal	
9	Araria	Pradeep Kumar Singh	Bharatiya Janata Party	
10	Kishanganj	Mohammad Asrarul Haque	Indian National Congress	
11	Katihar	Nikhil Kumar Choudhary	Bharatiya Janata Party	
12	Purnia	Uday Singh	Bharatiya Janata Party	
13	Madhepura	Sharad Yadav	Janata Dal	
14	Darbhanga	Kirti Azad	Bharatiya Janata Party	
15	Muzaffarpur	Jai Narain Prasad Nishad	Janata Dal	
16	Vaishali	Raghuvansh Prasad Singh	Rashtriya Janata Dal	
17	Gopalganj (SC)	Purnmasi Ram	Janata Dal	
18	Siwan	Om Prakash Yadav	Independent	
19	Maharajganj	Uma Shankar Singh (died on 24 January 2013)	Rashtriya Janata Dal	
19	Maharajganj	Prabhunath Singh (elected on 5 June 2013)	Rashtriya Janata Dal	
20	Saran	Lalu Prasad Yadav (disqualified on 30 September 2013)	Rashtriya Janata Dal	Lok Sabha Leader, Rashtriya Janata Dal (2009–2013)
20	Saran	Vacant from 30 September 2013		
21	Hajipur (SC)	Ram Sundar Das	Janata Dal	Lok Sabha Leader, Janata Dal (United)
22	Ujiarpur	Aswamedh Devi	Janata Dal	
23	Samastipur (SC)	Maheshwar Hazari	Janata Dal	
24	Begusarai	Monazir Hassan	Janata Dal	
25	Khagaria	Dinesh Chandra Yadav	Janata Dal	
26	Bhagalpur	Syed Shahnawaz Hussain	Bharatiya Janata Party	
27	Banka	Digvijay Singh (died on 24 June 2010)	Independent	
27	Banka	Putul Kumari (elected on 24 November 2010)	Independent	
28	Munger	Rajiv Ranjan Singh alias Lalan Singh	Janata Dal	
29	Nalanda	Kaushalendra Kumar	Janata Dal	
30	Patna Sahib	Shatrughan Sinha	Bharatiya Janata Party	
31	Pataliputra	Ranjan Prasad Yadav	Janata Dal	
32	Arrah	Meena Singh	Janata Dal	
33	Buxar	Jagada Nand Singh	Rashtriya Janata Dal	
34	Sasaram (SC)	Meira Kumar	Indian National Congress	Cabinet Minister, Water Resources (2009), Speaker of the Lok Sabha (2009–2014)
35	Karakat	Mahabali Singh	Janata Dal	
36	Jahanabad	Jagdish Sharma (disqualified on 30 September 2013)	Janata Dal	
36	Jahanabad	Vacant from 30 September 2013		
37	Aurangabad	Sushil Kumar Singh	Janata Dal	
38	Gaya (SC)	Hari Manjhi	Bharatiya Janata Party	
39	Nawada	Bhola Singh	Bharatiya Janata Party	
40	Jamui (SC)	Bhudeo Choudhary	Janata Dal	

== Chhattisgarh ==
Keys: BJP (8) INC (1) Vacant (2)

No.	Constituency	Member of Parliament	Party affiliation	Roles and responsibilities
1	Sarguja (ST)	Murarilal Singh (died on 4 December 2013)	Bharatiya Janata Party	
1	Sarguja (ST)	Vacant from 4 December 2013		
2	Raigarh (ST)	Vishnu Deo Sai	Bharatiya Janata Party	
3	Janjgir-Champa (SC)	Kamla Devi Patle	Bharatiya Janata Party	
4	Korba	Charan Das Mahant	Indian National Congress	Minister of State, Agriculture and Food Processing Industries (2011–2014)
5	Bilaspur	Dilip Singh Judeo (died on 14 August 2013)	Bharatiya Janata Party	
5	Bilaspur	Vacant from 14 August 2013		
6	Rajnandgaon	Madhusudan Yadav	Bharatiya Janata Party	
7	Durg	Saroj Pandey	Bharatiya Janata Party	
8	Raipur	Ramesh Bais	Bharatiya Janata Party	Chief Whip, Bharatiya Janata Party
9	Mahasamund	Chandulal Sahu	Bharatiya Janata Party	
10	Bastar (ST)	Baliram Kashyap (died on 10 March 2011)	Bharatiya Janata Party	
10	Bastar (ST)	Dinesh Kashyap (elected on 13 May 2011)	Bharatiya Janata Party	
11	Kanker (ST)	Sohan Potai	Bharatiya Janata Party	

== Goa ==
Keys: BJP (1) INC (1)

No.	Constituency	Member of Parliament	Party affiliation	Roles and responsibilities
1	North Goa	Shripad Yesso Naik	Bharatiya Janata Party	
2	South Goa	Francisco Sardinha	Indian National Congress	Chairman, Estimates Committee

== Gujarat ==
Keys: BJP (17) INC (9)

No.	Constituency	Member of Parliament	Party affiliation	Roles and responsibilities
1	Kachchh (SC)	Poonamben Veljibhai Jat	Bharatiya Janata Party	
2	Banaskantha	Mukesh Gadhvi (died on 1 March 2013)	Indian National Congress	
2	Banaskantha	Haribhai Parthibhai Chaudhary (elected on 5 June 2013)	Bharatiya Janata Party	
3	Patan	Jagdish Thakor	Indian National Congress	
4	Mahesana	Jayshreeben Patel	Bharatiya Janata Party	
5	Sabarkantha	Mahendrasinh Chauhan	Bharatiya Janata Party	
6	Gandhinagar	L. K. Advani	Bharatiya Janata Party	
7	Ahmedabad East	Harin Pathak	Bharatiya Janata Party	
8	Ahmedabad West (SC)	Kirit Premjibhai Solanki	Bharatiya Janata Party	
9	Surendranagar	Somabhai Gandalal Koli Patel	Indian National Congress	
10	Rajkot	Kunwarjibhai Mohanbhai Bavaliya	Indian National Congress	
11	Porbandar	Vitthal Radadiya (resigned on 3 January 2013)	Indian National Congress	
11	Porbandar	Vitthal Radadiya (elected on 5 June 2013)	Bharatiya Janata Party	
12	Jamnagar	Vikrambhai Arjanbhai Madam	Indian National Congress	
13	Junagadh	Dinu Solanki	Bharatiya Janata Party	
14	Amreli	Naranbhai Kachhadia	Bharatiya Janata Party	
15	Bhavnagar	Rajendrasinh Ghanshyamsinh Rana (Rajubhai Rana)	Bharatiya Janata Party	
16	Anand	Bharatsinh Solanki	Indian National Congress	Minister of State, Power (2009–2011), Minister of State, Railways (2011–2012), Minister of State (I/C), Drinking Water and Sanitation (2012–2014)
17	Kheda	Dinsha Patel	Indian National Congress	Minister of State (I/C), Micro, Small and Medium Enterprises (2009–2011), Minister of State (I/C), Mines (2011–2012), Cabinet Minister, Mines (2012–2014)
18	Panchmahal	Prabhatsinh Pratapsinh Chauhan	Bharatiya Janata Party	
19	Dahod (ST)	Prabha Kishor Taviad	Indian National Congress	
20	Vadodara	Balkrishna Khanderao Shukla	Bharatiya Janata Party	
21	Chhota Udaipur (ST)	Ramsinh Rathwa	Bharatiya Janata Party	
22	Bharuch	Mansukhbhai Vasava	Bharatiya Janata Party	
23	Bardoli (ST)	Tushar Amarsinh Chaudhary	Indian National Congress	Minister of State, Tribal Affairs (2009–2011), Minister of State, Road Transport and Highways (2011–2014)
24	Surat	Darshana Jardosh	Bharatiya Janata Party	
25	Navsari	C. R. Patil	Bharatiya Janata Party	
26	Valsad (ST)	Kishanbhai Vestabhai Patel	Indian National Congress	

== Haryana ==
Keys: INC (8) HJC(BL) (1) Vacant (1)

No.	Constituency	Member of Parliament	Party affiliation	Roles and responsibilities
1	Ambala (SC)	Kumari Selja (resigned on 10 April 2014)	Indian National Congress	Cabinet Minister, Housing and Urban Poverty Alleviation (2009–2012), Cabinet Minister, Tourism (2009–2011), Cabinet Minister, Culture (2011–2012), Cabinet Minister, Social Justice and Empowerment (2012–2014)
1	Ambala (SC)	Vacant from 10 April 2014		
2	Kurukshetra	Naveen Jindal	Indian National Congress	
3	Sirsa (SC)	Ashok Tanwar	Indian National Congress	
4	Hisar	Bhajan Lal (died on 3 June 2011)	Haryana Janhit Congress	Lok Sabha Leader, Haryana Janhit Congress (BL) (2009–2011)
4	Hisar	Kuldeep Bishnoi (elected on 17 October 2011)	Haryana Janhit Congress	Lok Sabha Leader, Haryana Janhit Congress (BL) (2011–2014)
5	Karnal	Arvind Kumar Sharma	Indian National Congress	
6	Sonipat	Jitender Singh Malik	Indian National Congress	
7	Rohtak	Deepender Singh Hooda	Indian National Congress	
8	Bhiwani-Mahendragarh	Shruti Choudhry	Indian National Congress	
9	Gurgaon	Inderjit Singh Rao	Indian National Congress	
10	Faridabad	Avtar Singh Bhadana	Indian National Congress	

== Himachal Pradesh ==
Keys: BJP (3) INC (1)

No.	Constituency	Member of Parliament	Party affiliation	Roles and responsibilities
1	Kangra	Rajan Sushant	Bharatiya Janata Party	
2	Mandi	Virbhadra Singh (resigned on 1 January 2013)	Indian National Congress	Cabinet Minister, Steel (2009–2011), Cabinet Minister, Micro, Small and Medium Enterprises (2011–2012)
2	Mandi	Pratibha Singh (elected on 30 June 2013)	Indian National Congress	
3	Hamirpur	Anurag Singh Thakur	Bharatiya Janata Party	
4	Shimla (SC)	Virender Kashyap	Bharatiya Janata Party	

== Jammu & Kashmir ==
Keys: JKNC (3) INC (2) Independent (1)

No.	Constituency	Member of Parliament	Party affiliation	Roles and responsibilities
1	Baramulla	Sharifuddin Shariq	Jammu & Kashmir National Conference	
2	Srinagar	Farooq Abdullah	Jammu & Kashmir National Conference	Lok Sabha Leader, Jammu & Kashmir National Conference, Cabinet Minister, New and Renewable Energy
3	Anantnag	Mirza Mehboob Beg	Jammu & Kashmir National Conference	
4	Ladakh	Hassan Khan	Independent	
5	Udhampur	Ch. Lal Singh	Indian National Congress	
6	Jammu	Madan Lal Sharma	Indian National Congress	

== Jharkhand ==
Keys: BJP (7) JMM (2) JVM(P) (2) INC (1) Independent (2)

No.	Constituency	Member of Parliament	Party affiliation	Roles and responsibilities
1	Rajmahal (ST)	Devidhan Besra	Bharatiya Janata Party	
2	Dumka (ST)	Shibu Soren	Jharkhand Mukti Morcha	
3	Godda	Nishikant Dubey	Bharatiya Janata Party	
4	Chatra	Inder Singh Namdhari	Independent	
5	Kodarma	Babulal Marandi	Jharkhand Vikas Morcha	
6	Giridih	Ravindra Kumar Pandey	Bharatiya Janata Party	
7	Dhanbad	Pashupati Nath Singh	Bharatiya Janata Party	
8	Ranchi	Subodh Kant Sahay	Indian National Congress	Cabinet Minister, Food Processing Industries (2009–2011), Cabinet Minister, Tourism (2011–2012)
9	Jamshedpur	Arjun Munda (resigned on 26 February 2011)	Bharatiya Janata Party	
9	Jamshedpur	Ajoy Kumar (elected on 4 July 2011)	Jharkhand Vikas Morcha	
10	Singhbhum (ST)	Madhu Koda	Independent	
11	Khunti (ST)	Karia Munda	Bharatiya Janata Party	Deputy Speaker of the Lok Sabha
12	Lohardaga (ST)	Sudarshan Bhagat	Bharatiya Janata Party	
13	Palamau (SC)	Kameshwar Baitha	Jharkhand Mukti Morcha	
14	Hazaribagh	Yashwant Sinha	Bharatiya Janata Party	

== Karnataka ==
Keys: BJP (18) INC (9) JD(S) (1)

No.	Constituency	Member of Parliament	Party affiliation	Roles and responsibilities
1	Chikkodi	Ramesh Vishwanath Katti	Bharatiya Janata Party	
2	Belgaum	Suresh Angadi	Bharatiya Janata Party	
3	Bagalkot	P. C. Gaddigoudar	Bharatiya Janata Party	
4	Bijapur (SC)	Ramesh Jigajinagi	Bharatiya Janata Party	
5	Gulbarga (SC)	Mallikarjun Kharge	Indian National Congress	Cabinet Minister, Labour and Employment (2009–2013), Cabinet Minister, Railways (2013–2014)
6	Raichur (ST)	Sanna Pakirappa	Bharatiya Janata Party	
7	Bidar	Dharam Singh	Indian National Congress	
8	Koppal	Shivaramagouda Shivanagouda	Bharatiya Janata Party	
9	Bellary (ST)	J. Shantha	Bharatiya Janata Party	
10	Haveri	Shivkumar Chanabasappa Udasi	Bharatiya Janata Party	
11	Dharwad	Pralhad Joshi	Bharatiya Janata Party	
12	Uttara Kannada	Anant Kumar Hegde	Bharatiya Janata Party	
13	Davanagere	G. M. Siddeshwara	Bharatiya Janata Party	
14	Shimoga	B. Y. Raghavendra	Bharatiya Janata Party	
15	Udupi Chikmagalur	D. V. Sadananda Gowda (resigned on 29 December 2011)	Bharatiya Janata Party	
15	Udupi Chikmagalur	K. Jayaprakash Hegde (elected on 12 March 2012)	Indian National Congress	
16	Hassan	H. D. Deve Gowda	Janata Dal	Lok Sabha Leader, Janata Dal (Secular)
17	Dakshina Kannada	Nalin Kumar Kateel	Bharatiya Janata Party	
18	Chitradurga (SC)	Janardhana Swamy	Bharatiya Janata Party	
19	Tumkur	G. S. Basavaraj	Bharatiya Janata Party	
20	Mandya	N. Chaluvaraya Swamy (resigned on 21 May 2013)	Janata Dal	
20	Mandya	Ramya Divya Spandana (elected on 24 August 2013)	Indian National Congress	
21	Mysore	Adagur H. Vishwanath	Indian National Congress	
22	Chamarajanagar (SC)	R. Dhruvanarayana	Indian National Congress	
23	Bangalore Rural	H. D. Kumaraswamy (resigned on 21 May 2013)	Janata Dal	
23	Bangalore Rural	D. K. Suresh (elected on 24 August 2013)	Indian National Congress	
24	Bangalore North	D. B. Chandre Gowda	Bharatiya Janata Party	
25	Bangalore Central	P. C. Mohan	Bharatiya Janata Party	
26	Bangalore South	Ananth Kumar	Bharatiya Janata Party	
27	Chikballapur	Veerappa Moily	Indian National Congress	Cabinet Minister, Law and Justice (2009–2011), Cabinet Minister, Corporate Affairs (2011–2012), Cabinet Minister, Petroleum and Natural Gas (2012–2014)
28	Kolar (SC)	K. H. Muniyappa	Indian National Congress	Minister of State, Railways (2009–2012), Minister of State (I/C), Micro, Small and Medium Enterprises (2012–2014)

== Kerala ==
Keys: INC (13) CPI(M) (4) IUML (2) KC(M) (1)

No.	Constituency	Member of Parliament	Party affiliation	Roles and responsibilities
1	Kasaragod	P. Karunakaran	Communist Party of India	
2	Kannur	K. Sudhakaran	Indian National Congress	
3	Vatakara	Mullappally Ramachandran	Indian National Congress	Minister of State, Home Affairs
4	Wayanad	M. I. Shanavas	Indian National Congress	
5	Kozhikode	M. K. Raghavan	Indian National Congress	
6	Malappuram	E. Ahamed	Indian Union Muslim League	Lok Sabha Leader, Indian Union Muslim League, Minister of State, Railways (2009–2011), Minister of State, External Affairs (2011–2014), Minister of State, Human Resource Development (2011–2012)
7	Ponnani	E. T. Muhammed Basheer	Indian Union Muslim League	
8	Palakkad	M. B. Rajesh	Communist Party of India	
9	Alathur (SC)	P. K. Biju	Communist Party of India	
10	Thrissur	P. C. Chacko	Indian National Congress	
11	Chalakudy	K. P. Dhanapalan	Indian National Congress	
12	Ernakulam	K. V. Thomas	Indian National Congress	Minister of State, Agriculture and Consumer Affairs, Food and Public Distribution (2009–2011); Minister of State (I/C), Consumer Affairs, Food and Public Distribution (2011–2014)
13	Idukki	P. T. Thomas	Indian National Congress	
14	Kottayam	Jose K. Mani	Kerala Congress	Lok Sabha Leader, Kerala Congress (Mani)
15	Alappuzha	K. C. Venugopal	Indian National Congress	Minister of State, Power (2011–2012), Minister of State, Civil Aviation (2012–2014)
16	Mavelikara (SC)	Kodikkunnil Suresh	Indian National Congress	Minister of State, Labour and Employment (2012–2014)
17	Pathanamthitta	Anto Antony	Indian National Congress	
18	Kollam	N. Peethambara Kurup	Indian National Congress	
19	Attingal	A. Sampath	Communist Party of India	
20	Thiruvananthapuram	Shashi Tharoor	Indian National Congress	Minister of State, External Affairs (2009–2010), Minister of State, Human Resource Development (2012–2014)

== Madhya Pradesh ==
Keys: BJP (13) INC (11) BSP (1) Vacant (4)

No.	Constituency	Member of Parliament	Party affiliation	Roles and responsibilities
1	Morena	Narendra Singh Tomar	Bharatiya Janata Party	
2	Bhind (SC)	Ashok Chhaviram Argal	Bharatiya Janata Party	
3	Gwalior	Yashodhara Raje Scindia (resigned on 19 December 2013)	Bharatiya Janata Party	
3	Gwalior	Vacant from 19 December 2013		
4	Guna	Jyotiraditya Scindia	Indian National Congress	Minister of State, Commerce and Industry (2009–2012), Minister of State (I/C), Power (2012–2014)
5	Sagar	Bhupendra Singh (resigned on 13 December 2013)	Bharatiya Janata Party	
5	Sagar	Vacant from 13 December 2013		
6	Tikamgarh (SC)	Virendra Kumar Khatik	Bharatiya Janata Party	
7	Damoh	Shivraj Singh Lodhi	Bharatiya Janata Party	
8	Khajuraho	Jeetendra Singh Bundela	Bharatiya Janata Party	
9	Satna	Ganesh Singh	Bharatiya Janata Party	
10	Rewa	Deoraj Singh Patel	Bahujan Samaj Party	
11	Sidhi	Govind Prasad Mishra	Bharatiya Janata Party	
12	Shahdol (ST)	Rajesh Nandini Singh	Indian National Congress	
13	Jabalpur	Rakesh Singh	Bharatiya Janata Party	
14	Mandla (ST)	Basori Singh Masram	Indian National Congress	
15	Balaghat	K. D. Deshmukh (resigned om 12 December 2013)	Bharatiya Janata Party	
15	Balaghat	Vacant from 12 December 2013		
16	Chhindwara	Kamal Nath	Indian National Congress	Cabinet Minister, Road Transport and Highways (2009–2011), Cabinet Minister, Urban Development (2011–2014), Cabinet Minister, Parliamentary Affairs (2012–2014)
17	Hoshangabad	Uday Pratap Singh (resigned on 10 December 2013)	Indian National Congress	
17	Hoshangabad	Vacant from 10 December 2013		
18	Vidisha	Sushma Swaraj	Bharatiya Janata Party	Leader of the Opposition (2009–2014), Lok Sabha Leader, Bharatiya Janata Party
19	Bhopal	Kailash Chandra Joshi	Bharatiya Janata Party	
20	Rajgarh	Narayan Singh Amlabe	Indian National Congress	
21	Dewas (SC)	Sajjan Singh Verma	Indian National Congress	
22	Ujjain (SC)	Premchand Guddu	Indian National Congress	
23	Mandsaur	Meenakshi Natarajan	Indian National Congress	
24	Ratlam (ST)	Kantilal Bhuria	Indian National Congress	Cabinet Minister, Tribal Affairs (2009–2011)
25	Dhar (ST)	Gajendra Singh Rajukhedi	Indian National Congress	
26	Indore	Sumitra Mahajan	Bharatiya Janata Party	
27	Khargone (ST)	Makhansingh Solanki	Bharatiya Janata Party	
28	Khandwa	Arun Subhashchandra Yadav	Indian National Congress	Minister of State, Youth Affairs and Sports (2009), Minister of State, Heavy Industries and Public Enterprises (2009–2011), Minister of State, Agriculture and Food Processing Industries (2011)
29	Betul (ST)	Jyoti Dhurve	Bharatiya Janata Party	

== Maharashtra ==
Keys: INC (17) SS (10) BJP (9) NCP (7) BVA (1) SWP (1) Independent (1) Vacant (2)

No.	Constituency	Member of Parliament	Party affiliation	Roles and responsibilities
1	Nandurbar (ST)	Manikrao Hodlya Gavit	Indian National Congress	Pro tem Speaker of the Lok Sabha (2009), Minister of State, Social Justice and Empowerment (2013–2014)
2	Dhule	Pratap Narayanrao Sonawane	Bharatiya Janata Party	
3	Jalgaon	A. T. Patil	Bharatiya Janata Party	
4	Raver	Haribhau Jawale	Bharatiya Janata Party	
5	Buldhana	Prataprao Ganpatrao Jadhav	Shiv Sena	
6	Akola	Sanjay Shamrao Dhotre	Bharatiya Janata Party	
7	Amravati (SC)	Anandrao Vithoba Adsul	Shiv Sena	
8	Wardha	Datta Meghe	Indian National Congress	
9	Ramtek (SC)	Mukul Wasnik	Indian National Congress	Cabinet Minister, Social Justice and Empowerment (2009–2012)
10	Nagpur	Vilas Muttemwar	Indian National Congress	
11	Bhandara–Gondiya	Praful Patel	Nationalist Congress Party	Minister of State (I/C), Civil Aviation (2009–2011), Cabinet Minister, Heavy Industries and Public Enterprises (2011–2014)
12	Gadchiroli–Chimur (ST)	Marotrao Kowase	Indian National Congress	
13	Chandrapur	Hansraj Gangaram Ahir	Bharatiya Janata Party	
14	Yavatmal–Washim	Bhavana Gawali	Shiv Sena	
15	Hingoli	Subhash Bapurao Wankhede	Shiv Sena	
16	Nanded	Bhaskarrao Bapurao Khatgaonkar Patil	Indian National Congress	
17	Parbhani	Ganeshrao Nagorao Dudhgaonkar	Shiv Sena	
18	Jalna	Raosaheb Danve	Bharatiya Janata Party	
19	Aurangabad	Chandrakant Khaire	Shiv Sena	
20	Dindori (ST)	Harischandra Devram Chavan	Bharatiya Janata Party	
21	Nashik	Sameer Bhujbal	Nationalist Congress Party	
22	Palghar (ST)	Baliram Sukur Jadhav	Bahujan Vikas Aaghadi	Lok Sabha Leader, Bahujan Vikas Aaghadi
23	Bhiwandi	Suresh Kashinath Taware	Indian National Congress	
24	Kalyan	Anand Paranjpe	Shiv Sena	
24	Kalyan	Vacant from 1 March 2014		
25	Thane	Sanjeev Naik	Nationalist Congress Party	
26	Mumbai North	Sanjay Nirupam	Indian National Congress	
27	Mumbai North West	Gurudas Kamat	Indian National Congress	Minister of State, Communications and Information Technology (2009–2011), Minister of State, Home Affairs (2011), Minister of State (I/C), Drinking Water and Sanitation (2011)
28	Mumbai North East	Sanjay Dina Patil	Nationalist Congress Party	
29	Mumbai North Central	Priya Dutt	Indian National Congress	
30	Mumbai South Central	Eknath Gaikwad	Indian National Congress	
31	Mumbai South	Milind Deora	Indian National Congress	Minister of State, Communications and Information Technology (2011–2014), Minister of State, Shipping (2012–2014)
32	Raigad	Anant Geete	Shiv Sena	Lok Sabha Leader, Shiv Sena
33	Maval	Gajanan Dharmshi Babar	Shiv Sena	
34	Pune	Suresh Kalmadi	Indian National Congress	
35	Baramati	Supriya Sule	Nationalist Congress Party	
36	Shirur	Shivajirao Adhalarao Patil	Shiv Sena	
37	Ahmednagar	Dilipkumar Gandhi	Bharatiya Janata Party	
38	Shirdi (SC)	Bhausaheb Rajaram Wakchaure	Shiv Sena	
39	Beed	Gopinath Munde	Bharatiya Janata Party	Deputy Leader of the Opposition; Chairman, Public Accounts Committee (2010)
40	Osmanabad	Padamsinh Bajirao Patil	Nationalist Congress Party	
41	Latur (SC)	Jaywantrao Awale	Indian National Congress	
42	Solapur (SC)	Sushilkumar Shinde	Indian National Congress	Cabinet Minister, Power (2009–2012), Cabinet Minister, Home Affairs and Leader of the House (2012–2014)
43	Madha	Sharad Pawar (elected to Rajya Sabha in April 2014)	Nationalist Congress Party	Cabinet Minister, Agriculture (2009–2011), Cabinet Minister, Food and Civil Supplies, Consumer Affairs and Public Distribution (2009–2011), Cabinet Minister, Agriculture and Food Processing Industries (2011–2014), Lok Sabha Leader, Nationalist Congress Party
43	Madha	Vacant from April 2014		
44	Sangli	Pratik Prakashbapu Patil	Indian National Congress	Minister of State, Heavy Industries and Public Enterprises (2009), Minister of State, Youth Affairs and Sports (2009–2011), Minister of State, Coal (2011–2014)
45	Satara	Udayanraje Bhosale	Nationalist Congress Party	
46	Ratnagiri–Sindhudurg	Nilesh Narayan Rane	Indian National Congress	
47	Kolhapur	Sadashivrao Dadoba Mandlik	Independent	
48	Hatkanangle	Raju Shetti	Swabhimani Paksha	Lok Sabha Leader, Swabhimani Paksha

== Manipur ==
Keys: INC (2)

No.	Constituency	Member of Parliament	Party affiliation	Roles and responsibilities
1	Inner Manipur	Thokchom Meinya	Indian National Congress	
2	Outer Manipur (ST)	Thangso Baite	Indian National Congress	

== Meghalaya ==
Keys: INC (1) NCP (1)

No.	Constituency	Member of Parliament	Party affiliation	Roles and responsibilities
1	Shillong (ST)	Vincent Pala	Indian National Congress	Minister of State, Water Resources (2009–2012); Minister of State, Minority Affairs (2011–2012)
2	Tura (ST)	Agatha K Sangma	Nationalist Congress Party	Minister of State, Rural Development (2009–2012)

== Mizoram ==
Keys: INC (1)

No.	Constituency	Member of Parliament	Party affiliation	Roles and responsibilities
1	Mizoram (ST)	C. L. Ruala	Indian National Congress	

== Nagaland ==
Keys: Vacant (1)

No.	Constituency	Member of Parliament	Party affiliation	Roles and responsibilities
1	Nagaland	C. M. Chang (resigned on 21 September 2013)	Naga People's Front	Lok Sabha Leader, Naga People's Front
1	Nagaland	Vacant from 21 September 2013		

== Odisha ==
Keys: BJD (14) INC (6) CPI (1)

No.	Constituency	Member of Parliament	Party affiliation	Roles and responsibilities
1	Bargarh	Sanjay Bhoi	Indian National Congress	
2	Sundargarh (ST)	Hemanand Biswal	Indian National Congress	
3	Sambalpur	Amarnath Pradhan	Indian National Congress	
4	Keonjhar (ST)	Yashbant Narayan Singh Laguri	Biju Janata Dal	
5	Mayurbhanj (ST)	Laxman Tudu	Biju Janata Dal	
6	Balasore	Srikant Kumar Jena	Indian National Congress	Minister of State, Chemicals and Fertilizers (2009–2013), Minister of State (I/C), Statistics and Programme Implementation (2011–2014), Minister of State (I/C), Chemicals and Fertilizers (2013–2014)
7	Bhadrak (SC)	Arjun Charan Sethi	Biju Janata Dal	Lok Sabha Leader, Biju Janata Dal
8	Jajpur (SC)	Mohan Jena	Biju Janata Dal	
9	Dhenkanal	Tathagata Satpathy	Biju Janata Dal	
10	Bolangir	Kalikesh Narayan Singh Deo	Biju Janata Dal	
11	Kalahandi	Bhakta Charan Das	Indian National Congress	
12	Nabarangpur (ST)	Pradeep Kumar Majhi	Indian National Congress	
13	Kandhamal	Rudramadhab Ray	Biju Janata Dal	
14	Cuttack	Bhartruhari Mahtab	Biju Janata Dal	
15	Kendrapara	Baijayant Panda	Biju Janata Dal	
16	Jagatsinghpur (SC)	Bibhu Prasad Tarai	Communist Party of India	
17	Puri	Pinaki Misra	Biju Janata Dal	
18	Bhubaneswar	Prasanna Kumar Patasani	Biju Janata Dal	
19	Aska	Nityananda Pradhan	Biju Janata Dal	
20	Berhampur	Siddhanta Mahapatra	Biju Janata Dal	
21	Koraput (ST)	Jayaram Pangi	Biju Janata Dal	

== Punjab ==
Keys: INC (8) SAD (4) BJP (1)

No.	Constituency	Member of Parliament	Party affiliation	Roles and responsibilities
1	Gurdaspur	Partap Singh Bajwa	Indian National Congress	
2	Amritsar	Navjot Singh Sidhu	Bharatiya Janata Party	
3	Khadoor Sahib	Rattan Singh Ajnala	Shiromani Akali Dal	
4	Jalandhar (SC)	Mohinder Singh Kaypee	Indian National Congress	
5	Hoshiarpur (SC)	Santosh Chowdhary	Indian National Congress	Minister of State, Health and Family Welfare (2013–2014)
6	Anandpur Sahib	Ravneet Singh	Indian National Congress	
7	Ludhiana	Manish Tewari	Indian National Congress	Minister of State (I/C), Information and Broadcasting (2012–2014)
8	Fatehgarh Sahib (SC)	Sukhdev Singh Libra	Indian National Congress	
9	Faridkot (SC)	Paramjit Kaur Gulshan	Shiromani Akali Dal	
10	Ferozepur	Sher Singh Ghubaya	Shiromani Akali Dal	
11	Bathinda	Harsimrat Kaur Badal	Shiromani Akali Dal	
12	Sangrur	Vijay Inder Singla	Indian National Congress	
13	Patiala	Preneet Kaur	Indian National Congress	Minister of State, External Affairs

== Rajasthan ==
Keys: INC (19) BJP (4) Vacant (2)

No.	Constituency	Member of Parliament	Party affiliation	Roles and responsibilities
1	Ganganagar (SC)	Bharat Ram Meghwal	Indian National Congress	
2	Bikaner (SC)	Arjun Ram Meghwal	Bharatiya Janata Party	
3	Churu	Ram Singh Kaswan	Bharatiya Janata Party	
4	Jhunjhunu	Sis Ram Ola (died on 15 December 2013)	Indian National Congress	
4	Jhunjhunu	Vacant from 15 December 2013		
5	Sikar	Mahadeo Singh Khandela	Indian National Congress	Minister of State, Road Transport and Highways (2009–2012)
6	Jaipur Rural	Lal Chand Kataria	Indian National Congress	Minister of State, Defence (2012), Minister of State, Rural Development (2012–2014)
7	Jaipur	Mahesh Joshi	Indian National Congress	
8	Alwar	Jitendra Singh	Indian National Congress	Minister of State, Home Affairs (2011–2012), Minister of State (I/C), Youth Affairs and Affairs (2012–2014), Minister of State, Defence (2012–2014)
9	Bharatpur (SC)	Ratan Singh	Indian National Congress	
10	Karauli–Dholpur (SC)	Khiladi Lal Bairwa	Indian National Congress	
11	Dausa (ST)	Kirodi Lal Meena (resigned on 19 December 2013)	Independent	
11	Dausa (ST)	Vacant from 19 December 2013		
12	Tonk–Sawai Madhopur	Namo Narain Meena	Indian National Congress	Minister of State, Finance
13	Ajmer	Sachin Pilot	Indian National Congress	Minister of State, Communications and Information Technology (2009–2012), Minister of State (I/C), Corporate Affairs (2012–2014)
14	Nagaur	Jyoti Mirdha	Indian National Congress	
15	Pali	Badri Ram Jakhar	Indian National Congress	
16	Jodhpur	Chandresh Kumari	Indian National Congress	Cabinet Minister, Culture (2012–2014)
17	Barmer	Harish Chaudhary	Indian National Congress	
18	Jalore	Devji Patel	Bharatiya Janata Party	
19	Udaipur (ST)	Raghuvir Meena	Indian National Congress	
20	Banswara (ST)	Tarachand Bhagora	Indian National Congress	
21	Chittorgarh	Girija Vyas	Indian National Congress	Cabinet Minister, Housing and Urban Poverty Allevation (2013–2014)
22	Rajsamand	Gopal Singh Shekhawat	Indian National Congress	
23	Bhilwara	C. P. Joshi	Indian National Congress	Cabinet Minister, Rural Development and Panchayati Raj (2009–2011), Cabinet Minister, Road Transport and Highways (2011–2013), Cabinet Minister, Railways (2012, 2013)
24	Kota	Ijyaraj Singh	Indian National Congress	
25	Jhalawar–Baran	Dushyant Singh	Bharatiya Janata Party	

== Sikkim ==
Keys: SDF (1)

No.	Constituency	Member of Parliament	Party affiliation	Roles and responsibilities
1	Sikkim	Prem Das Rai	Sikkim Democratic Front	Lok Sabha Leader, Sikkim Democratic Front

== Tamil Nadu ==
Keys: DMK (17) AIADMK (10) INC (8) VCK (1) MDMK (1) CPI(M) (1) CPI (1)

No.	Constituency	Member of Parliament	Party affiliation	Roles and responsibilities
1	Thiruvallur (SC)	P. Venugopal	All India Anna Dravida Munnetra Kazhagam	
2	Chennai North	T. K. S. Elangovan	Dravida Munnetra Kazhagam	
3	Chennai South	C. Rajendran	All India Anna Dravida Munnetra Kazhagam	
4	Chennai Central	Dayanidhi Maran	Dravida Munnetra Kazhagam	Cabinet Minister, Textiles (2009–2011)
5	Sriperumbudur	T. R. Baalu	Dravida Munnetra Kazhagam	Lok Sabha Leader, Dravida Munnetra Kazhagam
6	Kancheepuram (SC)	P. Viswanathan	Indian National Congress	
7	Arakkonamvilu	S. Jagathrakshakan	Dravida Munnetra Kazhagam	Minister of State, Information and Broadcasting (2009–2012), Minister of State, New and Renewable Energy (2012), Minister of State, Commerce and Industry (2012–2013)
8	Vellore	Abdul Rahman	Dravida Munnetra Kazhagam	
9	Krishnagiri	E. G. Sugavanam	Dravida Munnetra Kazhagam	
10	Dharmapuri	R. Thamaraiselvan	Dravida Munnetra Kazhagam	
11	Tiruvannamalai	D. Venugopal	Dravida Munnetra Kazhagam	
12	Arani	M. Krishnasamy	Indian National Congress	
13	Viluppuram (SC)	M. Anandan	All India Anna Dravida Munnetra Kazhagam	
14	Kallakurichi	Adhi Sankar	Dravida Munnetra Kazhagam	
15	Salem	S. Semmalai	All India Anna Dravida Munnetra Kazhagam	
16	Namakkal	S. Gandhiselvan	Dravida Munnetra Kazhagam	Minister of State, Health and Family Welfare (2009–2013)
17	Erode	A. Ganeshamurthi	Marumalarchi Dravida Munnetra Kazhagam	Lok Sabha Leader, Marumalarchi Dravida Munnetra Kazhagam
18	Tiruppur	C. Sivasami	All India Anna Dravida Munnetra Kazhagam	
19	Nilgiris (SC)	A. Raja	Dravida Munnetra Kazhagam	Cabinet Minister, Communications and Information Technology (2009–2010)
20	Coimbatore	P. R. Natarajan	Communist Party of India	
21	Pollachi	K. Sugumar	All India Anna Dravida Munnetra Kazhagam	
22	Dindigul	N. S. V. Chitthan	Indian National Congress	
23	Karur	M. Thambidurai	All India Anna Dravida Munnetra Kazhagam	Lok Sabha Leader, All India Anna Dravida Munnetra Kazhagam
24	Tiruchirappalli	P. Kumar	All India Anna Dravida Munnetra Kazhagam	
25	Perambalur	D. Napoleon	Dravida Munnetra Kazhagam	Minister of State, Social Justice and Empowerment (2009–2013)
26	Cuddalore	S. Alagiri	Indian National Congress	
27	Chidambaram (SC)	Thol. Thirumavalavan	Viduthalai Chiruthaigal Katchi	Lok Sabha Leader, Viduthalai Chiruthaigal Katchi
28	Mayiladuthurai	O. S. Manian	All India Anna Dravida Munnetra Kazhagam	
29	Nagapattinam (SC)	A. K. S. Vijayan	Dravida Munnetra Kazhagam	
30	Thanjavur	S. S. Palanimanickam	Dravida Munnetra Kazhagam	Minister of State, Finance (2009–2013)
31	Sivaganga	P. Chidambaram	Indian National Congress	Cabinet Minister, Home Affairs (2009–2012), Cabinet Minister, Finance (2012–2014)
32	Madurai	M. K. Alagiri	Dravida Munnetra Kazhagam	Cabinet Minister, Chemicals and Fertilizers (2009–2013)
33	Theni	J. M. Aaroon Rashid	Indian National Congress	
34	Virudhunagar	Manickam Tagore	Indian National Congress	
35	Ramanathapuram	J. K. Rithesh	Dravida Munnetra Kazhagam	
36	Thoothukkudi	S. R. Jeyadurai	Dravida Munnetra Kazhagam	
37	Tenkasi (SC)	P. Lingam	Communist Party of India	
38	Tirunelveli	S. S. Ramasubbu	Indian National Congress	
39	Kanniyakumari	J. Helen Davidson	Dravida Munnetra Kazhagam	

== Tripura ==
Keys: CPI(M) (2)

No.	Constituency	Member of Parliament	Party affiliation	Roles and responsibilities
1	Tripura West	Khagen Das	Communist Party of India	
2	Tripura East (ST)	Baju Ban Riyan	Communist Party of India	

== Uttar Pradesh ==
Keys: SP (21) INC (20) BSP (20) BJP (10) RLD (5) Vacant (4)

No.	Constituency	Member of Parliament	Party affiliation	Roles and responsibilities
1	Saharanpur	Jagdish Singh Rana	Bahujan Samaj Party	
2	Kairana	Begum Tabassum Hasan	Bahujan Samaj Party	
3	Muzaffarnagar	Kadir Rana	Bahujan Samaj Party	
4	Bijnor	Sanjay Singh Chauhan	Rashtriya Lok Dal	
5	Nagina (SC)	Yashvir Singh	Samajwadi Party	
6	Moradabad	Mohammad Azharuddin	Indian National Congress	
7	Rampur	Jaya Prada Nahata	Samajwadi Party	
8	Sambhal	Shafiqur Rahman Barq	Bahujan Samaj Party	
9	Amroha	Devendra Nagpal	Rashtriya Lok Dal	
10	Meerut	Rajendra Agrawal	Bharatiya Janata Party	
11	Baghpat	Ajit Singh	Rashtriya Lok Dal	Lok Sabha Leader, Rashtriya Lok Dal, Cabinet Minister, Civil Aviation (2011–2014)
12	Ghaziabad	Rajnath Singh	Bharatiya Janata Party	
13	Gautam Buddh Nagar	Surendra Singh Nagar	Bahujan Samaj Party	
14	Bulandshahr (SC)	Kamlesh Balmiki	Samajwadi Party	
15	Aligarh	Raj Kumari Chauhan	Bahujan Samaj Party	
16	Hathras (SC)	Sarika Singh	Rashtriya Lok Dal	
17	Mathura	Jayant Chaudhary	Rashtriya Lok Dal	
18	Agra (SC)	Ram Shankar Katheria	Bharatiya Janata Party	
19	Fatehpur Sikri	Seema Upadhyay	Bahujan Samaj Party	
20	Firozabad	Akhilesh Yadav (resigned on 26 May 2009)	Samajwadi Party	
20	Firozabad	Raj Babbar (elected on 10 November 2009)	Indian National Congress	
21	Mainpuri	Mulayam Singh Yadav	Samajwadi Party	Lok Sabha Leader, Samajwadi Party
22	Etah	Kalyan Singh (resigned on 1 March 2014)	Jan Kranti Party	
22	Etah	Vacant from 1 March 2014		
23	Badaun	Dharmendra Yadav	Samajwadi Party	
24	Aonla	Maneka Gandhi	Bharatiya Janata Party	
25	Bareilly	Praveen Singh Aron	Indian National Congress	
26	Pilibhit	Varun Gandhi	Bharatiya Janata Party	
27	Shahjahanpur (SC)	Mithlesh Kumar	Samajwadi Party	
28	Kheri	Zafar Ali Naqvi	Indian National Congress	
29	Dhaurahra	Jitin Prasada	Indian National Congress	Minister of State, Petroleum and Natural Gas (2009–2011), Minister of State, Road Transport and Highways (2011–2012), Minister of State, Human Resource Development (2012–2014)
30	Sitapur	Kaisar Jahan	Bahujan Samaj Party	
31	Hardoi (SC)	Usha Verma	Samajwadi Party	
32	Misrikh (SC)	Ashok Kumar Rawat	Bahujan Samaj Party	
33	Unnao	Annu Tandon	Indian National Congress	
34	Mohanlalganj (SC)	Sushila Saroj	Samajwadi Party	
35	Lucknow	Lalji Tandon	Bharatiya Janata Party	
36	Rae Bareli	Sonia Gandhi	Indian National Congress	Parliamentary Party Leader, Indian National Congress, Chairperson, National Advisory Council
37	Amethi	Rahul Gandhi	Indian National Congress	
38	Sultanpur	Sanjaya Sinh (elected to Rajya Sabha in 2014)	Indian National Congress	
38	Sultanpur	Vacant from 2014		
39	Pratapgarh	Ratna Singh	Indian National Congress	
40	Farrukhabad	Salman Khurshid	Indian National Congress	Minister of State (I/C), Minority Affairs and Corporate Affairs (2009–2011), Cabinet Minister, Minority Affairs (2011–2012), Cabinet Minister, Water Resources (2011), Cabinet Minister, Law and Justice (2011–2012), Cabinet Minister, External Affairs (2012–2014)
41	Etawah (SC)	Premdas Katheria	Samajwadi Party	
42	Kannauj	Akhilesh Yadav (resigned on 2 May 2012)	Samajwadi Party	
42	Kannauj	Dimple Yadav (elected on 9 June 2012)	Samajwadi Party	
43	Kanpur	Sriprakash Jaiswal	Indian National Congress	Minister of State (I/C), Coal and Statistics and Programme Implementation (2009–2011), Cabinet Minister, Coal (2011–2014)
44	Akbarpur	Raja Ram Pal	Indian National Congress	
45	Jalaun (SC)	Ghanshyam Anuragi	Samajwadi Party	
46	Jhansi	Pradeep Jain Aditya	Indian National Congress	Minister of State, Rural Development
47	Hamirpur	Vijay Bahadur Singh	Bahujan Samaj Party	
48	Banda	R. K. Singh Patel	Samajwadi Party	
49	Fatehpur	Rakesh Sachan	Samajwadi Party	
50	Kaushambi (SC)	Shailendra Kumar	Samajwadi Party	
51	Phulpur	Kapil Muni Karwariya	Bahujan Samaj Party	
52	Allahabad	Rewati Raman Singh	Samajwadi Party	
53	Barabanki (SC)	P. L. Punia	Indian National Congress	
54	Faizabad	Nirmal Khatri	Indian National Congress	
55	Ambedkar Nagar	Rakesh Pandey	Bahujan Samaj Party	
56	Bahraich (SC)	Kamal Kishor	Indian National Congress	
57	Kaiserganj	Brij Bhushan Sharan Singh (resigned in 2014)	Samajwadi Party	
57	Kaiserganj	Vacant from 2014		
58	Shrawasti	Vinay Kumar Pandey	Indian National Congress	
59	Gonda	Beni Prasad Verma	Indian National Congress	Minister of State (I/C), Steel (2011), Cabinet Minister, Steel (2011–2014)
60	Domariyaganj	Jagdambika Pal (resigned on 7 March 2014)	Indian National Congress	Chairman, Committee on Public Undertakings (2011–2014)
60	Domariyaganj	Vacant from 7 March 2014		
61	Basti	Arvind Kumar Chaudhary	Bahujan Samaj Party	
62	Sant Kabir Nagar	Bhishma Shankar Tiwari	Bahujan Samaj Party	
63	Maharajganj	Harsh Vardhan	Indian National Congress	
64	Gorakhpur	Yogi Adityanath	Bharatiya Janata Party	
65	Kushi Nagar	Ratanjit Pratap Narain Singh	Indian National Congress	Minister of State, Road Transport and Highways (2009–2011), Minister of State, Petroleum and Natural Gas, and Corporate Affairs (2011–2012), Minister of State, Home Affairs (2012–2014)
66	Deoria	Gorakh Prasad Jaiswal	Bahujan Samaj Party	
67	Bansgaon (SC)	Kamlesh Paswan	Bharatiya Janata Party	
68	Lalganj (SC)	Bali Ram	Bahujan Samaj Party	
69	Azamgarh	Ramakant Yadav	Bharatiya Janata Party	
70	Ghosi	Dara Singh Chauhan	Bahujan Samaj Party	Lok Sabha Leader, Bahujan Samaj Party
71	Salempur	Ramashankar Rajbhar	Bahujan Samaj Party	
72	Ballia	Neeraj Shekhar	Samajwadi Party	
73	Jaunpur	Dhananjay Singh	Bahujan Samaj Party	
74	Machhlishahr (SC)	Tufani Saroj	Samajwadi Party	
75	Ghazipur	Radhe Mohan Singh	Samajwadi Party	
76	Chandauli	Ramkishun	Samajwadi Party	
77	Varanasi	Murli Manohar Joshi	Bharatiya Janata Party	Chairman, Public Accounts Committee (2010–2014)
78	Bhadohi	Gorakh Nath Pandey	Bahujan Samaj Party	
79	Mirzapur	Bal Kumar Patel	Samajwadi Party	
80	Robertsganj (SC)	Pakaudi Lal Kol	Samajwadi Party	

== Uttarakhand ==
Keys: INC (4) BJP (1)

No.	Constituency	Member of Parliament	Party affiliation	Roles and responsibilities
1	Tehri Garhwal	Vijay Bahuguna (resigned on 23 July 2012)	Indian National Congress	
1	Tehri Garhwal	Mala Rajya Laxmi Shah (elected on 13 October 2012)	Bharatiya Janata Party	
2	Garhwal	Satpal Maharaj	Indian National Congress	
3	Almora (SC)	Pradeep Tamta	Indian National Congress	
4	Nainital–Udhamsingh Nagar	Karan Chand Singh Baba	Indian National Congress	
5	Haridwar	Harish Rawat	Indian National Congress	Minister of State, Labour and Employment (2009–2011), Minister of State, Agriculture and Food Processing Industries (2011–2012), Cabinet Minister, Water Resources (2012–2014)

== West Bengal ==
Keys: TMC (18) CPI(M) (9) INC (6) CPI (2) AIFB (2) RSP(I) (2) BJP (1) SUCI(C) (1) Vacant (1)

No.	Constituency	Member of Parliament	Party affiliation	Roles and responsibilities
1	Cooch Behar (SC)	Nripendra Nath Roy	All India Forward Bloc	
2	Alipurduars (ST)	Manohar Tirkey	Revolutionary Socialist Party (India)	
3	Jalpaiguri (SC)	Mahendra Kumar Roy	Communist Party of India (Marxist)	
4	Darjeeling	Jaswant Singh	Bharatiya Janata Party	Chairman, Public Accounts Committee (2009–2010)
5	Raiganj	Deepa Dasmunsi	Indian National Congress	Minister of State, Urban Development (2012–2014)
6	Balurghat	Prasanta Kumar Majumdar	Revolutionary Socialist Party (India)	Lok Sabha Leader, Revolutionary Socialist Party
7	Maldaha Uttar	Mausam Noor	Indian National Congress	
8	Maldaha Dakshin	Abu Hasem Khan Choudhury	Indian National Congress	Minister of State, Health and Family Welfare (2012–2014)
9	Jangipur	Pranab Mukherjee (ceased to be a member upon election as President on 25 July 2012)	Indian National Congress	Cabinet Minister, Finance and Leader of the House (2009–2012)
9	Jangipur	Abhijit Mukherjee (elected on 13 October 2012)	Indian National Congress	
10	Baharampur	Adhir Ranjan Chowdhury	Indian National Congress	Minister of State, Railways (2012–2014)
11	Murshidabad	Abdul Mannan Hossain	Indian National Congress	
12	Krishnanagar	Tapas Paul	Trinamool Congress	
13	Ranaghat (SC)	Sucharu Ranjan Haldar	Trinamool Congress	
14	Bangaon (SC)	Gobinda Chandra Naskar	Trinamool Congress	
15	Barrackpore	Dinesh Trivedi	Trinamool Congress	Minister of State, Health and Family Welfare (2009–2011), Cabinet Minister, Railways (2011–2012)
16	Dum Dum	Saugata Roy	Trinamool Congress	Minister of State, Urban Development (2009–2012)
17	Barasat	Kakali Ghosh Dastidar	Trinamool Congress	
18	Basirhat	Haji Nurul Islam	Trinamool Congress	
19	Jaynagar (SC)	Tarun Mondal	Socialist Unity Centre of India (Communist)	Lok Sabha Leader, Socialist Unity Centre of India (Communist)
20	Mathurapur (SC)	Choudhury Mohan Jatua	Trinamool Congress	Minister of State, Information and Broadcasting (2009–2012)
21	Diamond Harbour	Somen Mitra (resigned on 28 January 2014)	Trinamool Congress	
21	Diamond Harbour	Vacant from 28 January 2014		
22	Jadavpur	Kabir Suman	Trinamool Congress	
23	Kolkata Dakshin	Mamata Banerjee (resigned on 9 October 2011)	Trinamool Congress	Cabinet Minister, Railways (2009–2011), Lok Sabha Leader, Trinamool Congress (2009–2011)
23	Kolkata Dakshin	Subrata Bakshi (elected on 4 December 2011)	Trinamool Congress	
24	Kolkata Uttar	Sudip Bandyopadhyay	Trinamool Congress	Minister of State, Health and Family Welfare (2011–2012), Lok Sabha Leader, Trinamool Congress (2011–2014)
25	Howrah	Ambica Banerjee (died on 25 April 2013)	Trinamool Congress	
25	Howrah	Prasun Banerjee (elected on 5 June 2013)	Trinamool Congress	
26	Uluberia	Sultan Ahmed	Trinamool Congress	Minister of State, Tourism (2009–2012)
27	Serampore	Kalyan Banerjee	Trinamool Congress	
28	Hooghly	Ratna De (Nag)	Trinamool Congress	
29	Arambagh (SC)	Sakti Mohan Malik	Communist Party of India (Marxist)	
30	Tamluk	Suvendu Adhikari	Trinamool Congress	
31	Kanthi	Sisir Adhikari	Trinamool Congress	Minister of State, Rural Development (2009–2012)
32	Ghatal	Gurudas Dasgupta	Communist Party of India	Lok Sabha Leader, Communist Party of India
33	Jhargram (ST)	Pulin Bihari Baske	Communist Party of India (Marxist)	
34	Medinipur	Prabodh Panda	Communist Party of India	
35	Purulia	Narahari Mahato	All India Forward Bloc	Lok Sabha Leader, All India Forward Bloc
36	Bankura	Basudeb Acharia	Communist Party of India (Marxist)	Lok Sabha Leader, Communist Party of India (Marxist)
37	Bishnupur (SC)	Susmita Bauri	Communist Party of India (Marxist)	
38	Bardhaman Purba (SC)	Anup Kumar Saha	Communist Party of India (Marxist)	
39	Burdwan–Durgapur	Sheikh Saidul Haque	Communist Party of India (Marxist)	
40	Asansol	Bansa Gopal Chowdhury	Communist Party of India (Marxist)	
41	Bolpur (SC)	Ram Chandra Dome	Communist Party of India (Marxist)	
42	Birbhum	Satabdi Roy	Trinamool Congress	

== Andaman and Nicobar Islands ==
Keys: BJP (1)

No.	Constituency	Member of Parliament	Party affiliation	Roles and responsibilities
1	Andaman and Nicobar Islands	Bishnu Pada Ray	Bharatiya Janata Party	

== Chandigarh ==
Keys: INC (1)

No.	Constituency	Member of Parliament	Party affiliation	Roles and responsibilities
1	Chandigarh	Pawan Kumar Bansal	Indian National Congress	Cabinet Minister, Parliamentary Affairs (2009–2012), Cabinet Minister, Water Resources (2009–2011, 2011–2012), Cabinet Minister, Railways (2012–2013)

== Dadra and Nagar Haveli ==
Keys: BJP (1)

No.	Constituency	Member of Parliament	Party affiliation	Roles and responsibilities
1	Dadra and Nagar Haveli (ST)	Natubhai Gomanbhai Patel	Bharatiya Janata Party	

== Daman and Diu ==
Keys: BJP (1)

No.	Constituency	Member of Parliament	Party affiliation	Roles and responsibilities
1	Daman and Diu	Lalubhai Patel	Bharatiya Janata Party	

== National Capital Territory of Delhi ==
Keys: INC (7)

No.	Constituency	Member of Parliament	Party affiliation	Roles and responsibilities
1	Chandni Chowk	Kapil Sibal	Indian National Congress	Cabinet Minister, Human Resource Development (2009–2012), Cabinet Minister, Communications and Information Technology (2011–2014), Cabinet Minister, Law and Justice (2013–2014)
2	North East Delhi	Jai Parkash Aggarwal	Indian National Congress	
3	East Delhi	Sandeep Dikshit	Indian National Congress	
4	New Delhi	Ajay Maken	Indian National Congress	Minister of State, Home Affairs (2009–2011), Minister of State (I/C), Youth Affairs and Sports (2011–2012), Cabinet Minister, Housing and Urban Poverty Allevation (2012–2013)
5	North West Delhi (SC)	Krishna Tirath	Indian National Congress	Minister of State (I/C), Women and Child Development
6	West Delhi	Mahabal Mishra	Indian National Congress	
7	South Delhi	Ramesh Kumar	Indian National Congress	

== Lakshadweep ==
Keys: INC (1)

No.	Constituency	Member of Parliament	Party affiliation	Roles and responsibilities
1	Lakshadweep (ST)	Muhammed Hamdulla Sayeed	Indian National Congress	

== Puducherry ==
Keys: INC (1)

No.	Constituency	Member of Parliament	Party affiliation	Roles and responsibilities
1	Puducherry	V. Narayanasamy	Indian National Congress	Minister of State, Planning and Parliamentary Affairs (2009–2011); Minister of State, Personnel, Public Grievances and Pensions (2010–2014); Minister of State, Prime Minister's Office (2011–2014)

== Nominated ==
Keys: INC (2)

No.	Constituency	Member of Parliament	Party affiliation	Roles and responsibilities
1	Anglo-Indian Community	Ingrid Mcleod	Indian National Congress	
2	Anglo-Indian Community	Charles Dias	Indian National Congress	

== See also ==
- List of members of the 14th Lok Sabha
- List of members of the 16th Lok Sabha
