= Bharthana Assembly constituency =

Constituency of the Uttar Pradesh legislative assembly in India

Coordinates: 26.75°N 79.22°E

Bharthana
- Constituency No. 201 for the Uttar Pradesh Legislative Assembly

Constituency details
- Country: India
- Region: North India
- State: Uttar Pradesh
- District: Etawah
- Total electors: 4,07,642
- Reservation: SC

Member of Legislative Assembly
- 18th Uttar Pradesh Legislative Assembly
- Incumbent Raghvendra Kumar Singh
- Party: Samajwadi Party
- Elected year: 2022

Bharthana is a constituency of the Uttar Pradesh Legislative Assembly covering the city of Bharthana in the Etawah district of Uttar Pradesh, India.

Bharthana is one of five assembly constituencies in the Etawah Lok Sabha constituency. Since 2008, this assembly constituency is numbered 201 amongst 403 constituencies.

== Members of the Legislative Assembly ==
Year	Member	Party
1957	Ghasi Ram	Indian National Congress
1957	Meharban Singh	Indian National Congress
1962	Sahdeo Singh	Praja Socialist Party
1967	Sahdeo Singh	Samyukta Socialist Party
1969	Balram Singh Yadav	Indian National Congress
1974	Gore Lal Shakya	Indian National Congress (O)
1977	Mahendra Singh	Janata Party
1980	Gore Lal Shakya	Indian National Congress (I)
1985	Maharaj Singh Yadav	Lokdal
1989	Maharaj Singh Yadav	Janata Dal
1991	Maharaj Singh Yadav	Janata Party
1993	Maharaj Singh Yadav	Samajwadi Party
1996	Maharaj Singh Yadav	Samajwadi Party
2001^	Pradeep Kumar Yadav	Indian National Congress
2002	Vinod Kumar Yadav	Samajwadi Party
2007	Mulayam Singh Yadav	Samajwadi Party
2009^	Shiv Prasad Yadav	Bahujan Samaj Party
2012	Sukhdevi Verma	Samajwadi Party
2017	Savitri Katheria	Bharatiya Janata Party
2022	Raghvendra Kumar Singh	Samajwadi Party

★By election

== Election results ==
=== 2027 ===
2027 Uttar Pradesh Legislative Assembly election: Bharthana
Party	Candidate	Votes	%	±%
INDIA				
NDA				
BSP				
NOTA	None of the above			
Majority				
Turnout				
gain from		Swing		

=== 2022 ===
2022 Uttar Pradesh Legislative Assembly election: Bharthana
Party	Candidate	Votes	%	±%
SP	Raghvendra Gautam	103,676	42.02	+7.24
BJP	Siddartha Shankar Dohare	96,117	38.96	+3.33
BSP	Kamlesh Ambedkar	37,599	15.24	−11.63
Jan Adhikar Party	Rakesh Chandra	4,185	1.7	
NOTA	None of the above	1,257	0.51	−0.19
Majority		7,559	3.06	+2.21
Turnout		246,734	60.53	+1.53
SP gain from BJP		Swing		

2017 Uttar Pradesh Legislative Assembly Election: Bharthana
Party	Candidate	Votes	%	±%
BJP	Savitri Katheria	82,005	35.63	
SP	Kamlesh Katheria	80,037	34.78	
BSP	Raghvendra Kumar Gautam	61,838	26.87	
NOTA	None of the above	1,608	0.7	
Majority		1,968	0.85	
Turnout		230,140	59.0	
