= Karm Kshetra Post Graduate College =

College in Etawah, Uttar Pradesh, India

Karm Kshetra Post Graduate College, Etawah
- Type: Government aided college
- Established: 1959; 67 years ago
- Founder: Lala Hazari Lal Verma
- Academic affiliations: Chhatrapati Shahu Ji Maharaj University (1968 - present); Agra University (1959 - 1968)
- President: Damru
- Principal: Mahendra Singh
- Students: 9840
- Undergraduates: 7020
- Postgraduates: 2820
- Location: Etawah - 206001, Uttar Pradesh, India; 26.7802°N 79.0120°E
- Campus: Urban
- Website: kkpgcollegeetawah.ac.in

Karm Kshetra Post Graduate College, Etawah, formerly known as, Kurmi Kshatriya Post Graduate College, Etawah is a college in Etawah, Uttar Pradesh, India.

== Affiliations ==
At first the college was affiliated to Agra University. In the year 1968, it got affiliated to Kanpur University (now Chhatrapati Shahu Ji Maharaj University).

== Notable alumni ==
- Ashok Kumar Doharey, former MP
- Arvind Pratap, former MLC
- Devesh Shakya, MP
- Ram Singh Shakya, former MP
- Vinay Shakya, former MLA
- Balram Singh Yadav, former Union Minister of State
- Mulayam Singh Yadav, former Minister of Defence (India) & Former Chief Minister of Uttar Pradesh
- Shivpal Singh Yadav, MLA & former Cabinet Minister (Uttar Pradesh Government)
