= Arvind Pratap =

Indian politician based in Uttar Pradesh

Member of Legislative Council
- In office 2016–2022
- Constituency: Mathura-Etah-Mainpuri

Personal details
- Born: 15 July 1973 (age 53)
- Party: Samajwadi Party
- Relations: Ram Gopal Yadav (uncle)
- Parents: Sahab Singh (father); Geeta Devi (mother)
- Education: Chaudhary Charan Singh Degree College, Heonra, Etawah; K.K. Degree College, Etawah; Chhatrapati Shahu Ji Maharaj University
- Profession: Politician

Arvind Pratap is an Indian politician, affiliated with Samajwadi Party and a former Member of Uttar Pradesh Legislative Council from Mathura-Etah-Mainpuri seat (2016–2022).

His mother Geeta Devi was the sister of Ram Gopal Yadav. She died in August 2021.

== Education and career ==
He did his graduation from Chaudhary Charan Singh Degree College, Heonra, Etawah of Chhatrapati Shahu Ji Maharaj University in 1998 and post graduation from K.K. Degree College, Etawah of Chhatrapati Shahu Ji Maharaj University in 2000. He also served as Block Pramukh of Karhal before becoming an MLC in 2016.
