= Ram Gopal Yadav =

Indian politician (born 1946)

Member of Parliament, Rajya Sabha
- Incumbent
- Assumed office 26 November 2008
- Constituency: Uttar Pradesh
- In office 5 July 1992 – 4 July 2004
- Constituency: Uttar Pradesh

Member of Parliament, Lok Sabha
- In office 13 May 2004 – 26 November 2008
- Preceded by: Mulayam Singh Yadav
- Succeeded by: Shafiqur Rahman Barq
- Constituency: Sambhal, Uttar Pradesh

Personal details
- Born: 29 June 1946 (age 80) Saifai, United Provinces, British India
- Party: Samajwadi Party
- Spouse: Phoolan Devi (m. 1962; died 2010)
- Relations: Mulayam Singh Yadav (cousin); Shivpal Singh Yadav (cousin); Akhilesh Yadav (nephew); Dharmendra Yadav (nephew); Tej Pratap Singh Yadav (grand-nephew); Aditya Yadav (nephew); Arvind Pratap (nephew)
- Children: 4 (1 daughter and 3 sons; including Akshay Yadav)
- Education: Agra University; Kanpur University

Ram Gopal Yadav (born 29 June 1946) is an Indian politician from Uttar Pradesh. He is the Secretary-General of the Samajwadi Party and a Member of Parliament (MP) in Rajya Sabha, since 2008. Yadav also served as Lok Sabha MP of Sambhal from 2004 to 2008.

On 23 October 2016, he was expelled from the party by Shivpal Singh Yadav, the state president of Samajwadi Party. He was accepted later in the party. On 30 December 2016, Samajwadi Party leader Mulayam Singh Yadav, who was also Ram Gopal's cousin, expelled him from the party again for six years, but on the following day the expulsion was revoked by the party on constitutional grounds.

== Early life ==
Ram Gopal Yadav was born on 29 June 1946 in Saifai village, Etawah district, Uttar Pradesh to Bachchi Lal Yadav and Phool Wati. He had a sister Geeta Devi, who died in August 2021.

=== Family ===
Ram Gopal Yadav is the cousin of Ratan Singh Yadav, Mulayam Singh Yadav, Abhay Ram Yadav, Rajpal Singh Yadav and Shivpal Singh Yadav. Kamla Devi Yadav is his cousin sister.

Arvind Pratap who has served as MLC in Uttar Pradesh Legislative Council is the nephew of Ram Gopal Yadav (through his sister Geeta).

== Positions held ==
Ram Gopal Yadav has been elected once as Lok Sabha MP and 5 times as Rajya Sabha MP.

From	To	Position	Party
1992	1998	MP (1st term) in Rajya Sabha from Uttar Pradesh	SP
1998	2004	MP (2nd term) in Rajya Sabha from Uttar Pradesh	SP
2004	2008	MP (1st term) in 14th Lok Sabha from Sambhal (resigned in 2008)	SP
2008	2014	MP (3rd term) in Rajya Sabha from Uttar Pradesh	SP
2014	2020	MP (4th term) in Rajya Sabha from Uttar Pradesh	SP
2020	Present	MP (5th term) in Rajya Sabha from Uttar Pradesh	SP

=== Other positions ===
- 1989–1992: Chairman, Zila Parishad, Etawah
- 1994–2004: Leader of Samajwadi Party parliamentary group in Rajya Sabha
- 2004: Leader of Samajwadi Party in Lok Sabha
- September 2013–present: Leader of Samajwadi Party in Rajya Sabha
- 2017: Selected as Secretary-General of Samajwadi Party

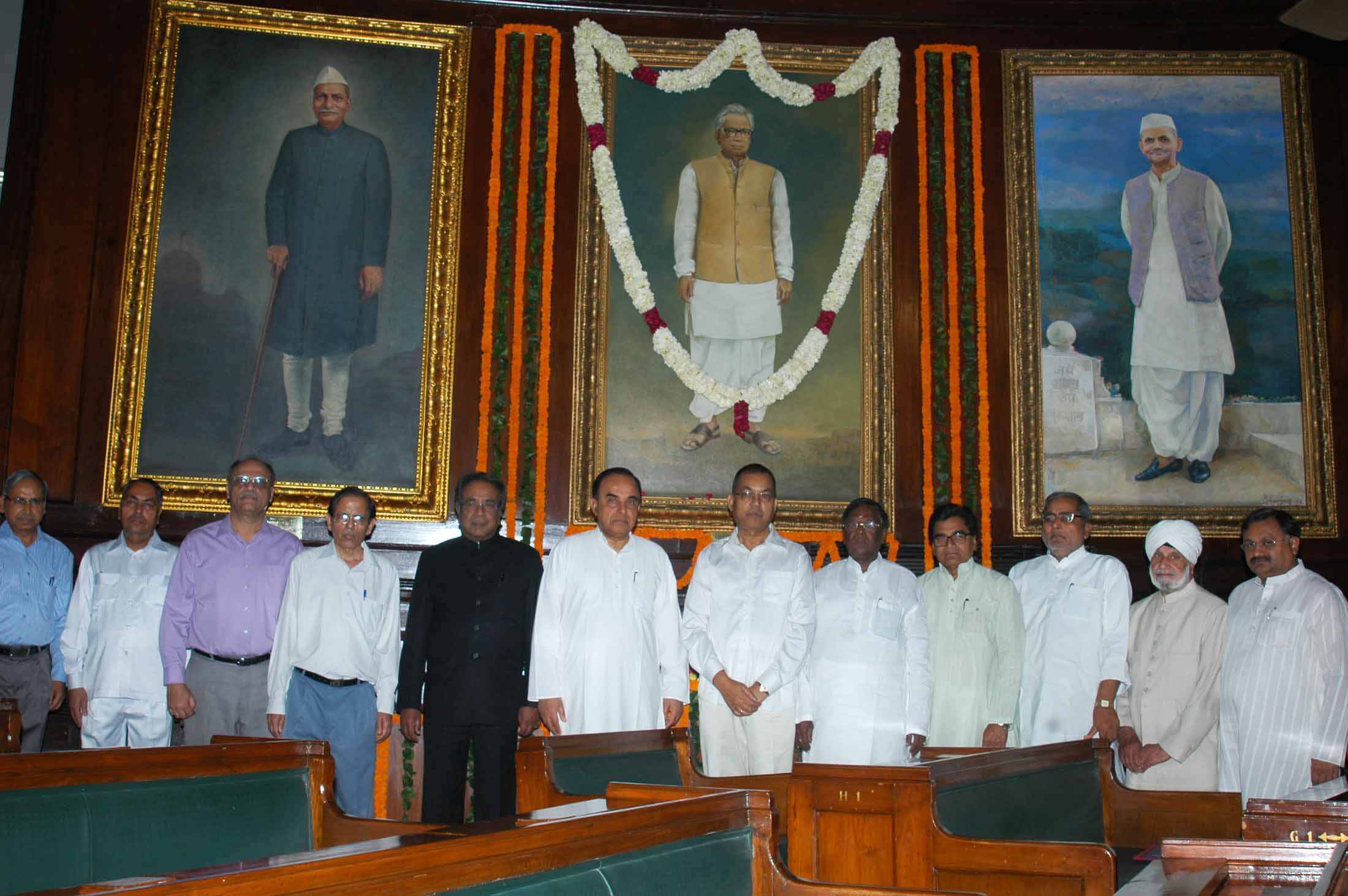
Ram Gopal Yadav (fourth from right) on the birth anniversary of Ram Manohar Lohia in Parliament

== Personal life ==
On 4 May 1962, Ram Gopal Yadav married Phoolan Devi and the couple had 1 daughter and 3 sons including Akshay Yadav. Phoolan Devi died in August 2010.

One of his son, Asit Yadav (Billu Yadav), died in a road accident in 1999. Later Billu's wife Abhilasha Yadav married Anurag Yadav (brother of Dharmendra Yadav) in 2004.

== Books ==
- Lohia Ka Samajwad
- Sansad Main Meri Baat
