= Savitri Katheria =

Indian politician

MLA, 17th Legislative Assembly
- In office 2017–2022
- Preceded by: Sukhdevi Verma
- Succeeded by: Raghvendra Kumar Singh
- Constituency: Bharthana, Etawah, Uttar Pradesh

Personal details
- Party: Bharatiya Janata Party
- Occupation: MLA
- Profession: Politician

Savitri Katheria is an Indian politician and a member of 17th Legislative Assembly, Uttar Pradesh of India. She represents the ‘Bharthana’ constituency in Etawah district of Uttar Pradesh.

== Political career ==
Savitri Katheria contested Uttar Pradesh Assembly Election as Bharatiya Janata Party candidate and defeated her close contestant Kamlesh Kumar Katheria from Samajwadi Party with a margin of 1,968 votes.

== Posts held ==
#	From	To	Position	Comments
01	2017	Incumbent	Member, 17th Legislative Assembly	
