= Kamlesh Pathak =

Indian politician

Member of Legislative Council, Uttar Pradesh
- Incumbent
- Assumed office 6 July 2016
- Preceded by: Mohammad Atahar Khan, BSP

Personal details
- Party: Samajwadi Party
- Occupation: Politician

Kamlesh Kumar Pathak is a leader of the Samajwadi Party in Uttar Pradesh. On 10 June 2016, he was elected to the Uttar Pradesh Legislative Council.
