= Raghvendra Kumar Singh =

Member of the Uttar Pradesh Legislative Assembly

Member of Uttar Pradesh Legislative Assembly
- Incumbent
- Assumed office March 2022
- Preceded by: Savitri Katheria
- Constituency: Bharthana

Personal details
- Born: 18 August 1969 (age 57) Uttar Pradesh
- Party: Samajwadi Party
- Profession: Politician

Raghvendra Kumar Singh is an Indian politician, lawyer, and a member of the 18th Uttar Pradesh Assembly from the Bharthana Assembly constituency of the Etawah district. He is a member of the Samajwadi Party.

== Early life ==
Raghvendra Kumar Singh was born on 18 August 1969 in Uttar Pradesh to a Hindu family of Avadh Kishor. He married Rita Choudhary on 14 June 1993, and they had three children.

== See also ==
- Samajwadi Party
- 18th Uttar Pradesh Assembly
- Bharthana Assembly constituency
