= Shahid Siddiqui =

Indian politician

Personal details
- Born: 15 August 1951 (age 75) Ballimaran, old Delhi
- Party: Congress (1997-99); Samajwadi Party (2002-08); Bahujan Samaj Party (2008-09); Rashtriya Lok Dal (2010-12); Samajwadi Party (January 2012-July 2012)
- Education: University of Delhi
- Occupation: Politician, Journalist

Shahid Siddiqui is a former member of the Rajya Sabha, the Upper House of the Indian Parliament representing the state of Uttar Pradesh from 2002 to 2008. He is a journalist and the chief editor of the Nai Duniya, an Urdu weekly published from New Delhi.

== Early life ==
Siddiqui was born in 1951 to a family of journalists and writers. His father, Maulana Abdul Waheed Siddiqui, was a journalist and a leader in India's freedom movement. Shahid was the youngest among his siblings. His eldest brother Ahmed Mustafa Siddiqui Rahi was an author and the editor of several Urdu dailies including Nai Duniya. His brother Khalid Mustafa Siddiqui was the editor of Urdu digests Huma and Pakeeza Anchal and Hindi magazine Mahekta Anchal.

He showed interest in writing in the Urdu language when he was twelve years old. He studied political science at Zakir Husain Delhi College (then known as Delhi College) and in 1971, merely a year into college, he started an Urdu fortnightly titled Waqiat. Siddiqui was a leader of Students' Federation of India during his university days. Waqiat closed down in 1973 and Siddiqui revived the daily newspaper Nai Duniya as a weekly magazine in the same year, whilst still being a university student. He went on to teach political science at Deshbandhu College from 1974 to 1986.

In 1986, Siddiqui became the first journalist to be arrested under the now repealed act TADA. He was imprisoned for 15 days for publishing an interview with the founder of Khalistan movement Jagjit Singh Chohan.

== Political career ==
Siddiqui began his political career with the Indian National Congress and was the head of its Minority Cell from 1997–99. He subsequently joined the Samajwadi party and was its National General Secretary from 2002 to 2008 and its Rajya Sabha member till he quit the Samajwadi party on 19 July 2008 and joined its arch-rival, the Bahujan Samaj Party (BSP). He was expelled from the BSP on 14 December 2009 for speaking out against its leader, Mayawati. He joined the Rashtriya Lok Dal on 12 April 2010. He cited his support for the RLD chief, Ajit Singh's demand for the creation of the state of Harit Pradesh as the reason for his joining the RLD. Prior to the 2012 Uttar Pradesh legislative assembly election, Siddiqui resigned from the RLD in protest against its alliance with the Congress party and returned to the Samajwadi party.

=== Expulsion from Samajwadi Party ===
He was expelled from Samajwadi Party in July 2012 for interviewing Gujarat chief minister Narendra Modi on post Godhra anti muslim riots for which Modi is accused of failing to control in time. Modi in that interview had said "Hang me if I am guilty". The cover-page interview ran into six pages and covered issues like state of Muslims in Gujarat, post-Godhra riots and other sensitive issues. Siddiqui termed Samajwadi party's stand of disowning him as a mere joke, saying "I had joined the party in presence of all major Samajwadi Party leaders, including Mulayam Singh Yadav. So this joke is really sad." It is reported in media that his expulsion from Samajwadi Party has irked Muslim leadership.
