= Vinay Shakya =

Indian politician (1969-2024

MLA Vinay Shakya
- Constituency: Bidhuna

MLA, 17th Legislative Assembly
- In office March 2017 – 9 March 2022
- In office 2002–2007

Personal details
- Died: 26 May 2024
- Citizenship: Indian
- Party: Samajwadi Party; Bharatiya Janata Party (2017-2022)
- Education: K.K. Degree College Etawah, Kanpur University
- Profession: Politician

Vinay Shakya (died 26 May 2024) was an Indian politician and a member of the 17th Legislative Assembly of Uttar Pradesh. He represented the Bidhuna (Auraiya) constituency of Uttar Pradesh and was a member of the Samajwadi Party. He did MA from KK Degree College Etawah, Kanpur University.

He joined Samajwadi Party after quitting Bharatiya Janata Party in 2022. He suffered a heart attack and died on 26 May 2024.

== Posts held ==
#	From	To	Position	Comments
01	2017	2022	Member, 17th Legislative Assembly	
