= Arjun Singh Bhadoria =

Indian politician

Arjun Singh Bhadauria

Member of Parliament, Lok Sabha
- In office 1977-1980
- Preceded by: Sri Shanker Tewari
- Succeeded by: Ram Singh Shakya
- In office 1967-1971
- Preceded by: G.N. Dixit
- Succeeded by: Sri Shanker Tewari
- In office 1957-1962
- Succeeded by: G.N. Dixit
- Constituency: Etawah, Uttar Pradesh

Personal details
- Born: 10 May 1910 Etawah, U.P., India
- Died: 22 May 2004 (aged 94) Etawah, U.P., India
- Party: Janata Party
- Other political affiliations: Samyukta Socialist Party
- Spouse: Sarla Bhadoria

Arjun Singh Bhadauria/Bhadoria was an Indian freedom fighter, progressive leader and politician. He led an underground resistance movement against British colonialism in central India in the 1940s. Arjun Singh Bhadauria was imprisoned multiple times for his political activism, both, before and after India's independence. He was known popularly by his sobriquet, "Commander Sahab" or "The Honorable Commander", a term of honor accorded to Arjun Singh Bhadauria by his life long comrades, Acharya Narendra Dev, Dr. Ram Manohar Lohia and Jayprakash Narayan, in recognition of his leading role in the freedom struggle. Arjun Singh Bhadauria advanced farmers' and peasants' rights all through his political career, and had, in fact, merged his historically significant and politically crucial peasants and farmers led anti-imperialist movement in the Chambal region of central India with the emergent "Socialist Party of India", which broke with the Indian National Congress in the late 1940s under the leadership of Lohia, Narayan and Narendra Dev to advance a progressive agenda for India. He was elected to the Lok Sabha, the lower house of the Indian Parliament from Etawah, Uttar Pradesh where he served three terms. In the mid-1970s, Arjun Singh Bhadauria, along with his wife Sarla Bhadauria, partnered with Jayprakash Narayan and other leaders in the anti-corruption and pro-democracy movement aimed against the then Congress government of Indira Gandhi, for which he spent 19 months in prison during the period of "Emergency" (1975–77). Arjun Singh Bhadauria died in 2004.
