= Etawah Lok Sabha constituency =

Constituency of the Indian parliament in Uttar Pradesh

Coordinates: 26.78°N 79.02°E

Etawah UP-41
- Lok Sabha constituency
- Interactive Map Outlining Etawah Lok Sabha constituency

Constituency details
- Country: India
- Region: North India
- State: Uttar Pradesh
- Assembly constituencies: Etawah; Bharthana; Dibiyapur; Auraiya; Sikandra
- Established: 1957
- Reservation: SC

Member of Parliament
- 18th Lok Sabha
- Incumbent Jitendra Dohre
- Party: Samajwadi Party
- Elected year: 2024

Etawah Lok Sabha constituency is one of the 80 Lok Sabha (parliamentary) constituencies in Uttar Pradesh state of India.

== Assembly segments ==
No	Name	District	Member	Party	2024 Lead
200	Etawah	Etawah	Sarita Bhadauria	BJP	SP
201	Bharthana (SC)	Etawah	Raghavendra Gautam	SP	SP
203	Dibiyapur	Auraiya	Pradeep Kumar Yadav	SP	SP
204	Auraiya (SC)	Auraiya	Gudiya Katheria	BJP	SP
207	Sikandra	Kanpur Dehat	Ajit Singh Pal	BJP	BJP

== Members of Parliament ==
Year	Member	Party
1957	Arjun Singh Bhadoria	Socialist Party
1962	G.N. Dixit	Indian National Congress
1967	Arjun Singh Bhadoria	Samyukta Socialist Party
1971	Sri Shanker Tewari	Indian National Congress
1977	Arjun Singh Bhadoria	Janata Party
1980	Ram Singh Shakya	Janata Party
1984	Raghuraj Singh Chaudhary	Indian National Congress (I)
1989	Ram Singh Shakya	Janata Dal
1991	Kanshi Ram	Bahujan Samaj Party
1996	Ram Singh Shakya	Samajwadi Party
1998	Sukhda Misra	Bharatiya Janata Party
1999	Raghuraj Singh Shakya	Samajwadi Party
2004	Raghuraj Singh Shakya	Samajwadi Party
2009	Premdas Katheria	Samajwadi Party
2014	Ashok Kumar Doharey	Bharatiya Janata Party
2019	Ram Shankar Katheria	Bharatiya Janata Party
2024	Jitendra Kumar Dohare	Samajwadi Party

== Election results ==
=== 2024 ===
2024 Indian general elections: Etawah
Party	Candidate	Votes	%	±%
SP	Jitendra Kumar Dohare	490,747	47.47	▲2.94
BJP	Ram Shankar Katheria	4,32,328	41.82	▼8.98
BSP	Sarika Singh Baghel	96,541	9.34	▲9.34
NOTA	None of the Above	6,266	0.61	▲0.06
Majority		58,419	5.65	▼0.62
Turnout		10,33,784	56.54	▼1.98
SP gain from BJP		Swing		

=== 2019 ===
2019 Indian general elections: Etawah
Party	Candidate	Votes	%	±%
BJP	Ram Shankar Katheria	522,119	50.80	
SP	Kamlesh Katheria	4,57,682	44.53	
INC	Ashok Kumar Doharey	16,570	1.61	
PSP(L)	Shambhu Dayal Dohare	8,675	0.84	
NOTA	None of the Above	5,610	0.55	
Majority		64,437	6.27	
Turnout		10,28,811	58.52	
BJP hold		Swing		

=== 2014 ===
2014 Indian general elections: Etawah
Party	Candidate	Votes	%	±%
BJP	Ashok Kumar Doharey	4,31,646	46.71	+30.12
SP	Prem Das Katheria	2,66,700	28.38	−15.32
BSP	Ajay Pal Singh Jatav	1,92,804	20.51	−15.86
INC	Hans Mukhi Kori	13,397	1.43	+1.43
AAP	Ujiyare Lal Dohare	5,923	0.63	+0.63
NOTA	None of the above	6,165	0.66	+0.66
Margin of victory		1,72,946	18.40	+11.07
Turnout		9,39,893	55.05	+10.03
BJP gain from SP		Swing	+30.22	

== See also ==
- Etawah district
- List of constituencies of the Lok Sabha
