= Ram Shankar Katheria =

Indian politician

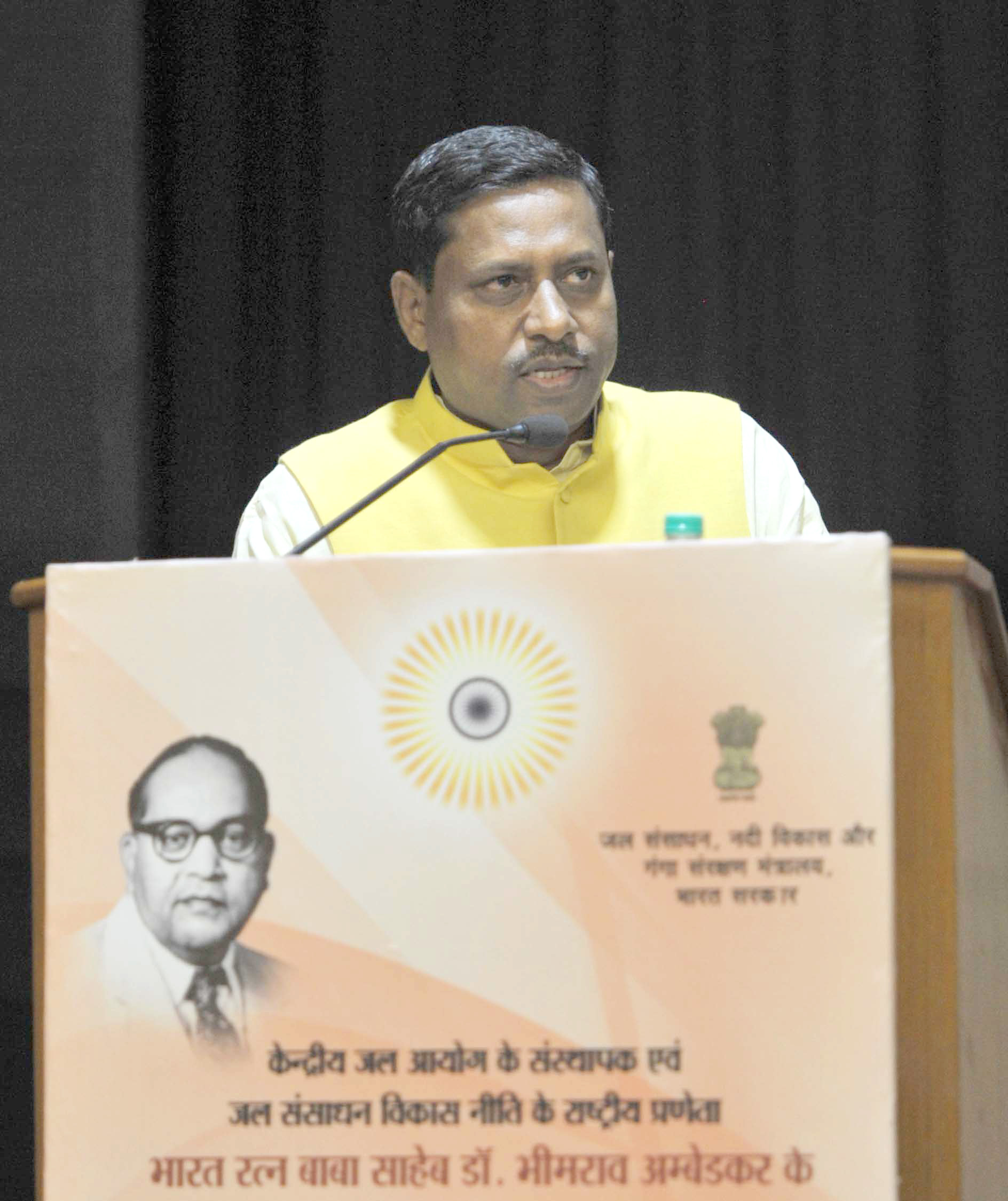
- Ram Shankar Katheria in 2018

Chairman of the National Commission for Scheduled Castes
- In office 31 May 2017 – 30 May 2020
- Preceded by: P. L. Punia
- Succeeded by: Vijay Sampla

Minister of State for Human Resource Development
- In office 26 May 2014 – 5 July 2016
- Prime Minister: Narendra Modi
- Preceded by: Shashi Tharoor
- Succeeded by: Mahendra Nath Pandey

Member of Parliament, Lok Sabha
- In office 23 May 2019–June 2024
- Preceded by: Ashok Kumar Doharey
- Succeeded by: Jitendra Dohre
- Constituency: Etawah

Member of Parliament, Lok Sabha
- In office 16 May 2009 – 23 May 2019
- Preceded by: Raj Babbar
- Succeeded by: S.P. Singh Baghel
- Constituency: Agra

Personal details
- Born: 21 September 1964 (age 62) Etawah, Uttar Pradesh, India
- Citizenship: India
- Party: Bharatiya Janata Party (BJP)
- Spouse: Mridula Katheria (m. 2001)
- Children: 3
- Education: Kanpur University
- Profession: Professor, Politician
- Committees: Member of four committees

Ram Shankar Katheria (born 21 September 1964) is an Indian politician and former chairman of the National Commission for Scheduled Castes. He is a member of the 17th Lok Sabha of India representing Etawah constituency of Uttar Pradesh. He represented the Agra constituency of Uttar Pradesh previously. He is a member of the Bharatiya Janata Party. He was a Minister of State in the Human Resource Development Ministry till 6 July 2016.

== Life ==
Katheria was born in Nagriya Sarawa village, Etawah, Uttar Pradesh on 21 September 1964 to Sone Lal and Shanti Devi. He spent his early years at the local Rashtriya Swayamsevak Sangh (RSS) unit, which also facilitated his education. He holds PhD from Kanpur University. He worked as a pracharak of the RSS in Agra for 13 years.

Before joining politics, he was a Professor of Hindi at the Agra University where he taught Dalit Chetna (Dalit upliftment) and wrote several books on the subject.

On 17 February 2001, he married Mridula Katheri. They have two sons and one daughter.

== Political career ==
Katheria was appointed as a National General-Secretary of the BJP in August 2014 and, in October the same year made in charge of the Chhattisgarh and Punjab states. In his November cabinet expansion, Narendra Modi inducted Katheria as a Minister of State in the Human Resource Development Ministry, where he served till 6 July 2016.

#	From	To	Position
01	2009	2014	Member, 15th Lok Sabha
02	2009	2014	Member, Committee on Urban Development
03	2009	2014	Member, Committee on Papers Laid on the Table
04	2009	2014	Member, Committee on Petitions
05	2009	2014	Member, Consultative Committee on Rural Development
06	2017	2020	Chair, National Commission for Scheduled Castes

== Controversies ==
Katheria has been charged with forging two of his degree mark-sheets (for BA and MA) allegedly to secure a job at the Agra University. The case is being heard in an Agra court. Katheria has also listed 20 other pending cases against him in his election affidavit.

== Publications ==
Katheria has written four books.

== See also ==
- List of members of the 15th Lok Sabha of India
- Politics of India
- Parliament of India
- Government of India
- Agra (Lok Sabha constituency)
