= Sarita Bhadauria =

Indian politician (born 1963)

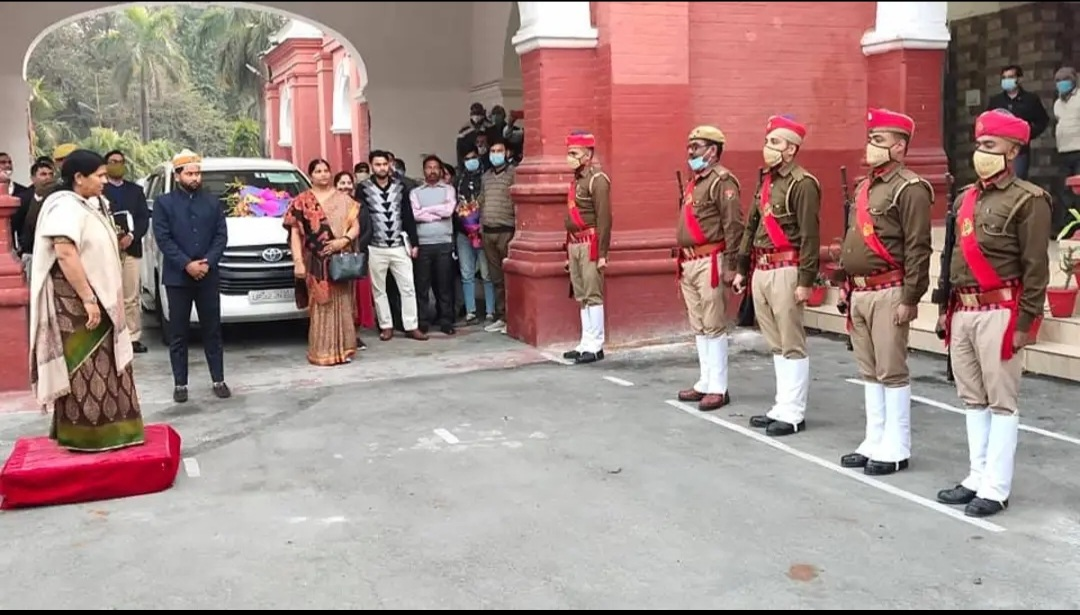

Chairman of the Mahila Balvikas Sanyukt Samiti (U.P)
- Incumbent
- Assumed office 3 December 2019.

Member of the Uttar Pradesh legislative assembly
- Incumbent
- Assumed office 11 March 2017
- Preceded by: Raghuraj Singh Shakya
- Constituency: Etawah

Vice President of Bharatiya Janata Party (U.P.)
- In office 2013–2016

Vice President of BJP Mahila Morcha
- In office 2010–2013

Secretary of Bharatiya Janata Party (U.P.)
- In office 2007–2010

Personal details
- Born: 4 January 1963 (age 63) Kishni, Uttar Pradesh, India
- Party: Bharatiya Janata Party
- Other political affiliations: Indian National Congress
- Spouse: Late Shri. Abhay Veer Singh Bhadauria
- Children: Reenu Chauhan Ashish Bhadauria Rohit Bhadauria
- Education: Kanpur University
- Profession: Social worker, agriculturist, politician

Sarita Bhadauria (born 4 January 1963) is an Indian politician from Uttar Pradesh. She is also a member of 18th Legislative Assembly, Uttar Pradesh of India. She hails from the Etawah constituency in Uttar Pradesh which is considered to be the stronghold of Mulayam Singh Yadav and Akhilesh Yadav. She defeated the Samajwadi party's candidate by 17234 votes in the 2017 Assembly and by 4277 votes in 2022 Assembly elections.

== Political career ==
She entered into politics in 1999 and contested the unsuccessful parliamentary elections on a congress ticket from Etawah constituency. Soon after in the year 2000 she joined Bharatiya Janta Party and again contested the 2004 Loksabha elections from the Etawah seat but lost. Initially she started working in public as a basic social worker but soon gained popularity among the masses. She was made the secretary of the Uttar Pradesh unit of BJP in 2007. In 2010 she was made the national vice president of BJP Mahila Morcha when Smriti Irani was the president. In 2013 she was made the vice president of the Bharatiya Janta Party Uttar Pradesh unit. Currently she holds the post of UP President of the Beti Bachao Beti Padhao Abhiyan under the leadership of PM Shri Narendra Modi. In 2017 she was elected as a member of the Legislative Assembly of Uttar Pradesh from Etawah (Vidhan Sabha constituency) as the Bharatiya Janta Party candidate. She received 91234 votes in this election.

== Personal life ==
Her husband's name was Abhay Veer Singh. She has two sons and a daughter, who is married to a doctor, Ashish Chauhan.
