= Premdas Katheria =

Indian politician

MP
- In office 15th Lok Sabha 2009-2014
- Preceded by: Hoti Lal Agarwal
- Constituency: Etawah (Uttar Pradesh)

Personal details
- Born: 10 January 1965 (age 61) Bijauli, Etawah, Uttar Pradesh, India
- Citizenship: India
- Party: Bharatiya Janata Party (BJP)
- Other political affiliations: Samajwadi Party
- Spouse: Mrs. Vinesh Kadheria.
- Children: 2 sons & 2 daughters.
- Education: Kanpur University
- Profession: Agriculturist & Politician
- Committees: Committee on Agriculture (Member).

Premdas Katheria was a member of the 15th Lok Sabha of India. He represented the Etawah constituency of Uttar Pradesh and is a member of the Samajwadi Party.

Etawah constituency was reserved seat for scheduled caste category.

== Education and background ==
Premdas holds a B.Ed. degree from Kanpur University, Kanpur, Uttar Pradesh. He was an agriculturist before joining politics.

== Posts held ==
| # | From | To | Position |
|---|---|---|---|
| 01 | 1996 | Date | Block Pramukh |
| 02 | 2000 | 2005 | President, District Panchayat, Etawah |
| 03 | 2005 | - | Member, District Panchayat |
| 04 | 2009 | 2014 | Member, 15th Lok Sabha |
| 05 | 2009 | 2014 | Member, Committee on Agriculture |

== See also ==
- List of members of the 15th Lok Sabha of India
- Politics of India
- Parliament of India
- Government of India
