= Sukhda Misra =

Indian politician and social worker

MP
- Constituency: Etawah

Personal details
- Born: 15 October 1941 Daulatpur (Uttar Pradesh)
- Party: Bahujan Samaj Party
- Spouse: S. K. Misra
- Profession: Politician, Social worker

Sukhda Misra (born 15 October 1941) is a political and social worker and a member of parliament elected from the Etawah constituency in the Indian state of Uttar Pradesh in 1998 as a Bharatiya Janata Party candidate. In 2009 general elections she contested from Kanpur on Bahujan Samaj Party ticket, but she lost with margin of 1,66,614 against Shriprakash Jaiswal.

== Education & Career ==
Sukhda completed her B.A in Chandigarh. She was elected as a Member of the Uttar Pradesh Legislative Assembly during 1974-77 and 1980–91. She was elected to the 12th Lok Sabha in 1998 and during 1998–99, she served as

- Member on the Committee on Energy and its Sub-Committee-I on Power
- Member on Joint Committee on the Empowerment of Women and its Sub-Committee on Education and Health Programmes for Women
- Member, Consultative Committee, Ministry of Civil Aviation
- Special Invitee, Consultative Committee, Ministry of Surface Transport
