= Dadua =

Indian criminal (died 2007)

Shiv Kumar Patel
- Dadua (ददुआ)
- Born: Devkali village, Chitrakoot district, Uttar Pradesh
- Died: 22 July 2007; Ailaha village, Chitrakoot district, Uttar Pradesh
- Occupation: Dacoit
- Children: 2, including Veer Singh Patel
- Parents: Ram Pyare Patel (father); Krishnawati Patel (mother)
- Relatives: Bal Kumar Patel (brother); Ram Singh Patel (nephew)

Shiv Kumar Patel or Dadua (died 22 July 2007) was a criminal and dacoit who operated in ravines and forests on the borders between the Indian states of Uttar Pradesh and Madhya Pradesh. Dadua’s gang possessed sophisticated weaponry, including automatic rifles.

== Biography ==
Shiv Kumar Patel or Dadua was born in Devkali village of Chitrakoot district to Ram Pyare Patel and Krishnawati Patel. His first recorded instance of crime was the murder of Jagannath on 16 May 1978, for which he was arrested. He was called a revolutionary by some people. He was a member of the Seetharam gang since 1975.

After his release, Dadua joined the ranks of Raja Ragoli, where he learned the trade from Gaya Kurmi, the gang's co-leader, who is regarded as a major factor behind Dadua's rise.

In 1983, Raja was killed and Gaya Kurmi surrendered, leaving the gang jointly headed by Suraj Bhan and Dadua. Suraj Bhan was arrested a year later and Dadua formed his own gang at the insistence of Gaya Kurmi.

Dadua led the massacre in Ramu ka Purwa where he executed nine people on 20 June 1986; he suspected one of the victims to be a police informer.

He came to be known as "Veerappan of Bundelkhand" and terrorized the region.

== Death ==
Dadua was shot along with several gang members in a fight with Special Task Force (STF) of the Uttar Pradesh Police in Ailaha village near Manikpur (Chitrakoot district) on 22 July 2007.

== Family and legacy ==
At the time of his death, his son Veer Singh Patel was the chairman of the Karwi panchayat and later became member (MLA) of Uttar Pradesh Vidhan Sabha from Chitrakoot (2012-2017).

Dadua's brother Bal Kumar Patel has served as Lok Sabha MP of Mirzapur (2009-2014). His nephew Ram Singh Patel is member (MLA) of Uttar Pradesh Vidhan Sabha from Patti (2022–Present).

A temple was built for him in 2016 at Dhata town, Fatehpur district.

In 2020, web series Beehad Ka Baghi was released. It was inspired by the life of Dadua.
