= Bal Kumar Patel =

Indian politician

Member of Parliament (MP) in Lok Sabha
- In office 2009–2014
- Preceded by: Ramesh Dube
- Succeeded by: Anupriya Patel
- Constituency: Mirzapur

Personal details
- Born: 1 January 1964 (age 62) Devkali, Chitrakoot, (Uttar Pradesh).
- Citizenship: India
- Party: Samajwadi Party
- Spouse: Rambai Patel (m. 1980)
- Relations: Dadua (brother); Veer Singh Patel (nephew)
- Children: 4 (1 daughter and 3 sons, including Ram Singh Patel)
- Education: Bhauri Intermediate College, Chitrakoot, Uttar Pradesh
- Profession: Agriculturist, Businessperson & Politician

Bal Kumar Patel (born 1 January 1964) is an Indian politician and has served as a member of the 15th Lok Sabha of India. He represented the Mirzapur constituency of Uttar Pradesh and was a member of the Samajwadi Party (SP) political party before he joined Indian National Congress in March 2019. in November 2020, He rejoined Samajwadi Party. He is the brother of bandit Dadua and uncle of Veer Singh Patel, former MLA of Chitrakoot.

== Early life and education ==
Bal Kumar Patel was born in Devkali village, Chitrakoot district, Uttar Pradesh on 1 January 1964 to Ram Pyare Patel and Krishnawati Patel. Bal Kumar had a brother Shiv Kumar Patel (Dadua) who was killed by Uttar Pradesh Police in July 2007.

Bal Patel was educated at Bhauri Intermediate College, Chitrakoot, Uttar Pradesh. Highest qualification attained by him is Intermediate (12th). He was an agriculturist and businessperson before joining politics.

== Personal life ==
Bal Kumar Patel married Rambai Patel on 2 February 1980 and the couple have 1 daughter and 3 sons.

One of his son Ram Singh Patel is the present MLA from Patti (Pratapgarh district).

== Politics ==
Two years after the death of his brother Dadua, Bal Kumar Patel successfully contested the Lok Sabha elections from Mirzapur in 2009 as Samajwadi Party candidate. In his election affidavit of 2009, he had 10 criminal cases upon him.

== Positions held ==
#	From	To	Position	Party
1.	2009	2014	MP (1st term) in 15th Lok Sabha from Mirzapur	SP

== See also ==
- List of members of the 15th Lok Sabha of India
- Politics of India
- Parliament of India
- Government of India
