= Fourth Mayawati ministry =

Government of Uttar Pradesh, India (2007–12)

- 20th Cabinet of Uttar Pradesh

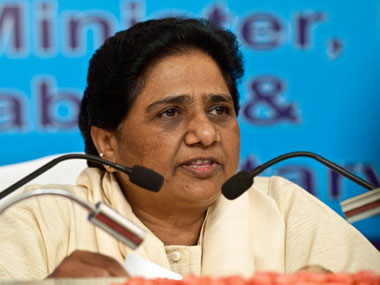
- Kumari Mayawati; Hon'ble Chief Minister of Uttar Pradesh
- Date formed: 13 May 2007
- Date dissolved: 15 March 2012

People and organisations
- Head of state: T. V. Rajeswar (until July 2009); B. L. Joshi (from July 2009)
- Head of government: Mayawati
- Member party: Bahujan Samaj Party
- Status in legislature: Majority
- Opposition party: Samajwadi Party
- Opposition leader: Mulayam Singh Yadav (Assembly); Ahmad Hasan (Council)

History
- Election: 2007 Uttar Pradesh Legislative Assembly election
- Legislature term: 5 years
- Predecessor: Third Mulayam Singh Yadav ministry
- Successor: Akhilesh Yadav ministry

The Fourth Mayawati ministry was the Council of Ministers in the 15th Uttar Pradesh Assembly, headed by Chief Minister Mayawati.

The ministry was formed after the 2007 Uttar Pradesh Legislative Assembly election, in which the Bahujan Samaj Party (BSP), under Mayawati's leadership, secured an absolute majority by winning 206 out of 403 seats. She took oath as the Chief Minister on 13 May 2007.

== Background ==
The state cabinet of Uttar Pradesh with Mayawati as the Chief Minister was sworn in on 13 May 2007 after the 2007 Uttar Pradesh Legislative Assembly election. The swearing-in ceremony took place at Kanshi Ram Smarak Sthal in Lucknow.

The Bahujan Samaj Party secured an absolute majority in the 2007 assembly elections, winning 206 out of 403 seats in the legislative assembly. The ministry was formed solely by the Bahujan Samaj Party without coalition support, making it the first single-party majority government in Uttar Pradesh after several years of coalition politics.

The council of ministers included representatives from Scheduled Castes, Other Backward Classes, Muslims, and upper-caste communities as part of Mayawati's "social engineering" strategy. The portfolios of the cabinet ministers were announced shortly after the oath-taking ceremony.

== Council of Ministers ==
Sl No.	Name	Portrait	Constituency	Department	Party
Chief Minister
1	Mayawati === Chief Minister ===		MLC	Home, Vigilance, Personnel, Appointments, Secretariat Administration, Other departments not allocated to any Minister	BSP
Cabinet Ministers
2	Naseemuddin Siddiqui		MLC	Excise; Public Works; Irrigation; Housing; Urban Planning; Census; Sugarcane Development; Any Other	BSP
3	Babu Singh Kushwaha		MLC	Family Welfare, Medical Education, Family Welfare, Panchayati Raj, Mining, Geology, Cooperative	BSP
4	Swami Prasad Maurya		MLC	Revenue, Relief, Rehabilitation, Public Grievances.	BSP
5	Sukhdev Rajbhar		Lalganj	Rural Development, Panchayati Raj	BSP
6	Lalji Verma		Tanda	Finance, Planning	BSP
7	Ramveer Upadhyay		Hathras	Energy, Transport	BSP
8	Indrajit Saroj		Manjhanpur	Social Welfare	BSP
9	Rajnath Sonkar Shastri			Labour and Employment	BSP
10	Thakur Jaiveer Singh		Barauli	Secondary Education, later Rural Development, Agricultural Marketing, Agricultural Foreign Trade. .	BSP
11	Veer Singh			Labour and Employment, Sericulture, Weaving.	BSP
12	Laxmi Narayan Chaudhary		Chhata	Agricultural Marketing, Agricultural Foreign Trade, Agriculture Export Promotion.	BSP
13	Rakeshdhar Tripathi		Handia	Higher Education	BSP
14	Janardan Dwivedi Narayan Rai			Registration, Stamp, Judicial Duties .	BSP
15	Nakul Dubey		Mahona	Urban Development, Water Resources, Environment, Culture, Urban Planning, Tax and Institutional Finance	BSP
16	Daddu Prasad		Manikpur	Rural Development	BSP
17	Narayan Singh		Etmadpur	Horticulture	BSP
18	Sudhir Goyal		MLC	Information, Science and Technology.	BSP
19	Ram Prasad Chaudhary		Kaptanganj	Food & Civil Supplies, Civil Supplies Control, Consumer Protection.; Food & Civil Supplies was retained while Measurement & Distribution was removed.	BSP
20	Dharam Singh Saini		Sarsawa	Vocational Education	BSP
21	Rangnath Mishra		Aurai	Secondary Education	BSP
22	Ayodhya Prasad Pal		Hawsa	Sports & Youth Welfare	BSP

== Minister of State ==
Sl No.	Name	Department	Party
1	Chandradev Ram Yadav	Small Scale Industries	BSP
2	Ashok Kumar	Land Development and Water Resources	BSP
3	Rajpal Tyagi	Agricultural Education and Research	BSP
4	Subhash Pandey	Culture	BSP
5	Dharamraj Nishad	Fisheries	BSP
6	Nand Gopal Gupta 'Nandi'	Institutional Finance; Stamp, Registration; Court Fees	BSP
7	Kamalakant Gautam	Finance later Education and Research.	BSP
8	Yograj Singh Balyan	Agro Education & Research	BSP

== Minister of State (Independent Charge) ==
Sl No.	Name	Department	Party
1	Dharamraj Nishad	Fisheries	BSP
2	Ram Achal Rajbhar	Transport	BSP
3	Anis Ahmad Khan	Minority Welfare; Haj	BSP
4	Ayodhya Prasad Pal	Sports; Youth Welfare	BSP
5	Jamuna Nishad	Fisheries; Nautical Welfare	BSP
6	Omwati	Technical Education; Food and Civil Supplies	BSP
7	Badshah Singh	Labour; Small Scale Industries	BSP
8	Rangnath Mishra	Rural Engineering Services; Secondary Education	BSP
9	Vinod Kumar	Tourism	BSP
10	Fateh Bahadur Singh	Forest; Animal Husbandry	BSP
11	Lakhi Ram Nagar	Minor Irrigation	BSP
12	Avadhesh Kumar Verma	Backward Classes Welfare	BSP
13	Ramhet	Election; Consumer Protection and Weights & Measures	BSP
14	Ram Pal Verma	Resettlement and Land Development	BSP
15	Anant Kumar Mishra	Health; Medical Education; Co-operatives	BSP
16	Awadhpal Singh Yadav	Animal Husbandry; Dairy Development	BSP
17	Akbar Husain	Additional Energy Sources	BSP
18	Sadal Prasad	Scheduled Castes and Scheduled Tribes Welfare; Vocational and Technical Education	BSP
19	Yashwant Singh	Urban Employment and Poverty Alleviation Programme	BSP
20	Ratan Lal Ahirwar	Ambedkar Village Development	BSP
21	Anand Sen Yadav	Food Processing	BSP
22	Jaiveer Singh	Flood Control; Drainage Scheme; Minor Irrigation	BSP
23	Bhagwati Prasad Sagar	Rehabilitation; Vocational Education	BSP
24	Sangram Singh	Food and Logistics; Khadi and Village Industries; Silk Industry	BSP
25	Abdul Mannan	Agricultural Foreign Trade; Agricultural Marketing	BSP
26	Yograj Singh	Agricultural Education; Agricultural Research	BSP
27	Vidhya Choudhary	Finance; Women Welfare	BSP
28	Rajesh Tiwari	Homeopathic Medicine; Religious Affairs	BSP
29	Masood Islam Ansari	Muslim Waqf	BSP
30	Sudhir Mishra	Ayurveda	BSP
31	Har Om	Home Guards; Civil Defence	BSP
32	Yashpal Singh	Science and Technology	BSP

== See also ==
- Mayawati
- Third Mayawati ministry
- Bahujan Samaj Party
- 2007 Uttar Pradesh Legislative Assembly election
