= Khatwara =

Khatwara is a small village in Rajapur tehsil in Chitrakoot district of Uttar Pradesh state, India. Its pin code is 210207.

Khatwara is well connected by roads to Allahabad and Karwi. Its situated 88 km west of Allahabad and 33 km North-East of Karwi.
