= Daddu Prasad =

Indian politician

Member of the Uttar Pradesh Legislative Assembly
- In office 1997–2012
- Preceded by: Mannu Lal Kuril
- Succeeded by: Chandrabhan Singh Patel
- Constituency: Manikpur

Cabinet Minister Government of Uttar Pradesh
- In office 2007–2012
- Chief Minister: Mayawati
- Ministry & Department's: Rural Development

Personal details
- Born: 5 October 1967 (age 58) Banda, Uttar Pradesh
- Party: Samajwadi Party
- Spouse: Hera devi
- Parents: Budhu Prasad (father); Muliya devi (mother)

Daddu Prasad (born 5 October 1967) is an Indian politician He was elected to the state of assembly in 1996, 2002 & 2007 Manikpur Sarhat in Chitrakoot district as a candidate of Bahujan Samaj Party (BSP) Daddu Prasad served as Rural Development Minister in the Uttar Pradesh government between 2007 and 2012.

and Member of the legislative assembly for three terms daddu is a member of the Samajwadi Party which he joined on 7 April 2025 after a long stint with Bahujan Samaj Party.

== Political career ==
Daddu Prasad has been a MLA for three terms. He represented the Manikpur Sarhat constituency, He was previously a member of Bahujan Samaj Party and was elected in the assembly as a member of BSP. In 1996, 2002, 2007 Prasad resigned from all party posts alleging Daddu Prasad "money for ticket" syndicate being run by the party.

== Personal life ==
Daddu Prasad is a Buddhist and an Ambedkarite, follower of B. R. Ambedkar. He converted to Buddhism from Hinduism.
