= Akhilesh Yadav ministry =

Government of Uttar Pradesh, India (2012–2017)

- 21st Ministry of Uttar Pradesh
- Date formed: 15 March 2012
- Date dissolved: 19 March 2017

People and organisations
- Head of state: Governor: Banwari Lal Joshi (2012–2014); Aziz Qureshi (acting) (17 June 2014 – 21 July 2014); Ram Naik (since 22 July 2014)
- Head of government: Akhilesh Yadav
- Member parties: Samajwadi Party
- Status in legislature: Majority
- Opposition party: Bahujan Samaj Party
- Opposition leader: Swami Prasad Maurya (March 2012 – June 2016); Gaya Charan Dinkar (June 2016 – March 2017); (assembly)

History
- Election: 2012
- Legislature terms: 6 years (Council); 5 years (Assembly)
- Predecessor: Fourth Mayawati ministry
- Successor: First Yogi Adityanath ministry

The Akhilesh Yadav ministry was the Council of Ministers in the 16th Uttar Pradesh Legislative Assembly headed by Chief Minister Akhilesh Yadav.

The ministry was formed after the 2012 Uttar Pradesh Legislative Assembly election, in which the Samajwadi Party under the leadership of Mulayam Singh Yadav & Akhilesh Yadav won the election.

== Cabinet Ministers ==
SI No.	Name	Department	Party
1.	Akhilesh Yadav; Chief Minister	Home, Finance, Energy, Excise, Higher and Secondary Education, Housing, SugarCane Development, Industrial Development and General Administration and Other departments not allocated to a Minister.	SP
2.	Raja Anand Singh	Minister of Agriculture and Religious Affairs	SP
3.	Raghuraj Pratap Singh	Minister of Food and Civil supplies.	IND
4.	Ahmed Hasan		SP
5.	Balram Yadav	Minister of Secondary Education.	SP
6.	Balwant Singh Ramoowalia	Minister of Jail	SP
7.	Awadhesh Prasad		SP
8.	Omprakash Singh	Minister of Tourism.	SP
9.	Ram Govind Chaudhary	Minister of Basic Education, Child Development and Nutrition.	SP
10.	Durga Prasad Yadav	Minister of Forest.	SP
11.	Brahma Shankar		SP
12.	Shahid Manzoor	Minister of Labour and Employment.	SP
13.	Raj Kishor Singh	Minister of Animal Husbandry and Minor Irrigation.	SP
14.	Manoj Kumar	Minister of Science & Technology.	SP
15.	Parasnath Yadava		SP
16.	Rajendra Chaudhary	Minister of Political Pension.	SP
17.	Iqbal Mehmood		SP
18.	Raj Kishore Singh	Minister of Panchayati Raj.	SP
19.	Ram Murti Verma	Minister of Dairy Development.	SP
20.	Azam Khan	Minister of Parliamentary Affairs, Muslim Waqf, Urban Development, Water Supplies, Urban Employment & Poverty Alleviation, Overall Urban Development, Minority Welfare and Haj.	SP
21.	Yasar Shah	Minister of Sales tax and Regulations.	SP
22.	Shivakant Ojha	Minister of Medical and Health.	SP
23.	Arvind Kumar Singh‘Gope’	Minister of Rural development.	SP
24.	Syed Arshad Maharajganj	Minister of Dairy Development and Transport.	SP
25.	Javed Abidi (Indian politician)	Minster of Adviser Irrigation department	SP
26.	Narendra Singh Verma		SP

== Minister of State ==
	Name of the h	Department
1.	Manoj Kumar Paras	Stamp & Civil Defence
2.	Mehboob Ali	Textiles & Sericulture Industries
3.	Yograj Singh	Agro Education & Research
4.	Sahjil Islam Ansari	Muslim Waqf
5.	Daddan Mishra	Ayurvedic Medicine
6.	Hari Om	Homeguards & P.R.D
7.	Yashpal Singh	Science & Technology

== Ministers of State (Independent Charge) ==
Name of the Minister	Department
Laxmikant	Fertilizer and Logistics
Dr. Yashwant Singh	Urban Employment & Poverty Alleviation Programme
Anis Ahmad Khan	Minority Welfare & Hajj
Ayodhya Prasad pal	Sports & Youth Welfare
Smt. Omwati	Khadi & Village Industries
Sudip Ranjan Sen	Tourism Chairman and State Minister
Lakhiram Nagar	Minor Irrigation
Awadesh Kumar Verma	Welfare of Backwards
Manpal Verma	Wasteland Development
Akbar Husain	Additional Sources of Energy
Pradeep Katiyar	Technical Education
Ratanlal Ahirwar	Dr. Ambedkar Integral Rural Development
Bhagwati Prasad Sagar	Employment (Except Professional Education)
Jaiveer Sin	Irrigation (Mechanical)

== See also ==
- First Yogi Adityanath ministry
- Third Mulayam Singh ministry
- First Narayan Dutt Tiwari ministry
- Second Narayan Dutt Tiwari ministry
- Third Narayan Dutt Tiwari ministry
- Fourth Narayan Dutt Tiwari ministry
- Vir Bahadur Singh ministry
- First Mayawati ministry
- Second Mayawati ministry
- Third Mayawati ministry
- Fourth Mayawati ministry
