= Rajendra Pratap Singh =

Indian politician (born 1954)

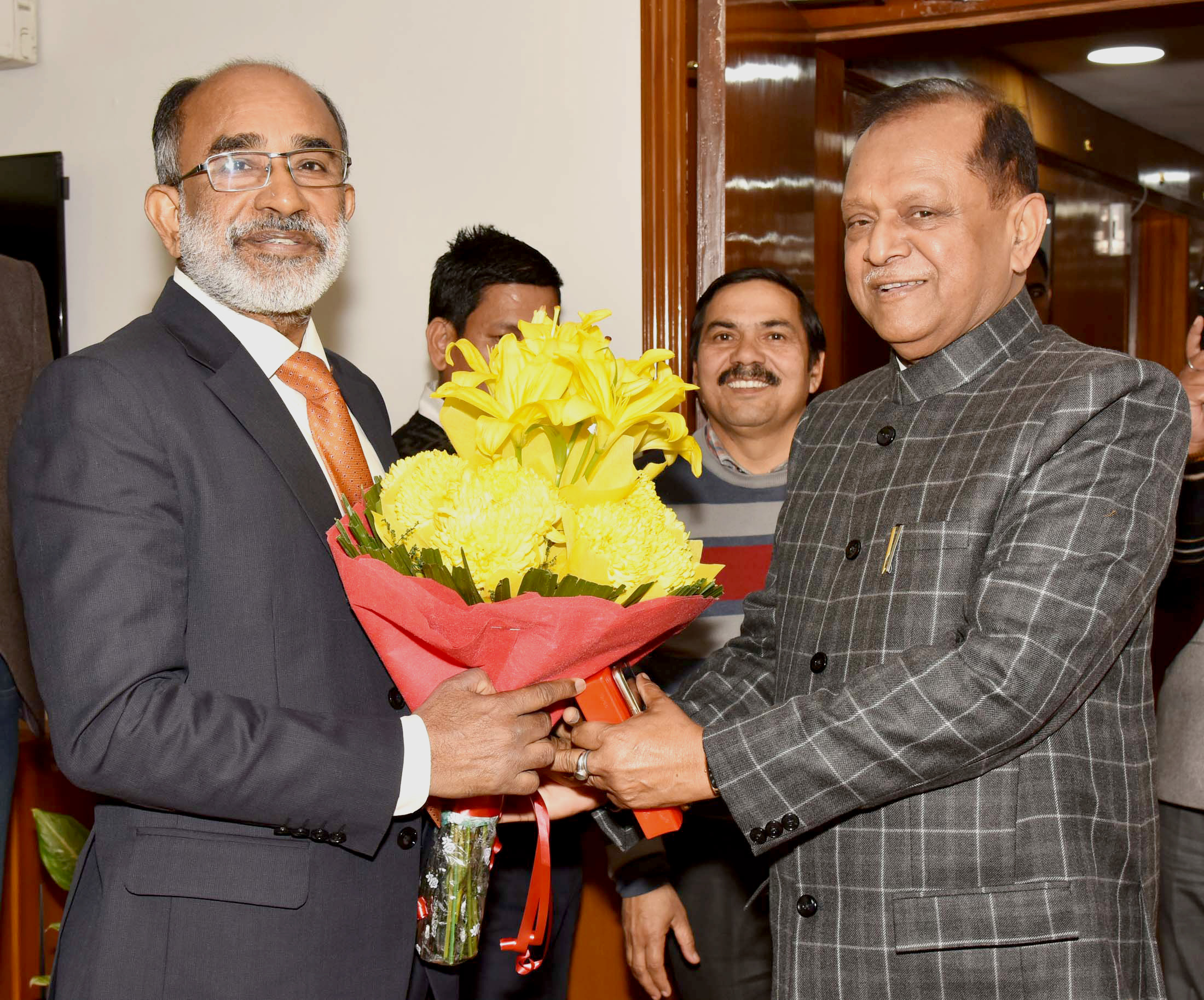

Minister of Rural Development Government of Uttar Pradesh
- In office 21 August 2019 – 25 March 2022
- Chief Minister: Yogi Adityanath
- Preceded by: Mahendra Kumar Singh
- Succeeded by: Keshav Prasad Maurya

Minister of Rural Engineering Department Government of Uttar Pradesh
- In office 19 March 2017 – 21 August 2019
- Chief Minister: Yogi Adityanath
- Succeeded by: Brajesh Pathak

Member of Uttar Pradesh Legislative Assembly
- In office 2017–2022
- Succeeded by: Ram Singh Patel
- Constituency: Patti
- In office 1996–2012
- Preceded by: Ram Lakhan
- Succeeded by: Ram Singh Patel
- Constituency: Patti

Member of Uttar Pradesh Legislative Council
- In office 1990–1996
- Constituency: Pratapgarh Local Authorities

Personal details
- Born: 20 October 1954 (age 71) Pratapgarh, Uttar Pradesh, India
- Party: Bhartiya Janata Party
- Spouse: Urmila Singh (m. 1973)
- Children: 4
- Nickname: Moti Singh

Rajendra Pratap Singh (born 20 October 1954), popularly known as Moti Singh, is an Indian politician affiliated with the Bhartiya Janata Party. He represents Patti assembly constituency of Pratapgarh district. He has been elected as the member of legislative assembly from the same constituency for four times in a row. In his fourth attempt for re-election there were errors in counting, which was later cleared by the high court (Rajendra Pratap Singh aka Moti Singh vs Ram Singh and others, 9 August 2016). The then MLA was removed and the seat was left vacant after the decision of High Court (Lucknow Bench). He won the 2017 elections from the same seat and became a Cabinet Minister in the 2017 Uttar Pradesh Cabinet. Previously, Shri. Singh served as Uttar Pradesh state Minister of Agriculture in 2003. He was cabinet minister in First Yogi Adityanath ministry.

== Personal life ==
Singh was born to Bharat Singh on 20 October 1954 in Pratapgarh, Uttar Pradesh, India. He holds Bachelor of Science degree and studied law from Allahabad University. He is an agriculturalist, industrialist and businessman. He married Urmila Singh on 28 May 1973. They have three daughters and a son.

== Political career ==
Singh's political career was started in 1983 when he was elected as Block Pramukh (Block chief) from Mangraura for the first time, which created record of securing maximum votes in district Pratapgarh. In 1988, he re-elected in block Pramukh election. He became a member of Uttar Pradesh Legislative Council from Pratapgarh district in 1990. Moti Singh is member of Uttar Pradesh Vidhan Sabha from 1996 to 2007, winning 1996, 2002, 2007 and 2017 elections. He has been appointed a cabinet minister on 19 March 2017.

Rajendra alias Moti Singh contested Uttar Pradesh assembly election 1989 from Indian National Congress Party and unsuccessfully he lost and Janata Dal's candidate Ram Lakhan won by margin 35.44% votes. Moti claimed that he had not lost election 1989, due to some technical problem his votes were not counted properly, still case is pending in a court on the issue of assembly election 1989.

Moti Singh won a seat from a Bhartiya Janata Party ticket and elected as Member of Legislative assembly in 1996 from Patti, Uttar Pradesh. he re-elected as legislator from the same constituency in 2002. He was state minister of agriculture in 2003. Moti Singh won again in 2007 Assembly Election with 29.74% of votes gain for Bhartiya Janata Party in Patti, Uttar Pradesh constituency. He lost to Samajwadi Party candidate Ram Singh Patel in 2012 Uttar Pradesh Assembly election, in 2017 election he again won against Samajwadi Party's Ram Singh Patel by 14,76 votes. In the 2022, he again lost to Samajwadi Party candidate Ram Singh Patel by a margin of 22,051 votes.

== See also ==
- Pratapgarh (Lok Sabha constituency)
- List of people from Pratapgarh
