= Bahupur =

- Village
- Location in Uttar Pradesh, India Bahupur (India)
- Coordinates: 25.97°N 82.1°E
- Country: India
- State: Uttar Pradesh
- District: Pratapgarh

Population (2011)
  - Total: 1,233

Language
  - Official: Hindi
- Time zone: UTC+5:30 (IST)
- Vehicle registration: UP - 72
- Website: up.gov.in

Bahupur is a village of Patti tehsil. Pratapgarh is a district of Bahupur. Pratapgarh district, Uttar Pradesh is in India. Bahupur belongs to Allahabad Division. It is located 27 km towards East from District headquarters Pratapgarh, 9 km from Mangraura and 180 km from State capital Lucknow. Nearest airport to the village is Allahabad Airport, 59.77 km and nearest Railway Station is Khundaur railway station which is about 11.78 km away. The Bahupur village has population of 1233 of which 564 are males while 669 are females as per Population Census 2011.
