= Bachharan =

Bachharan is a village in located in Chitrakoot district (Uttar Pradesh, India).
