= Third Mayawati ministry =

Government of Uttar Pradesh from 2002 to 2003

- 18th Ministry of Uttar Pradesh

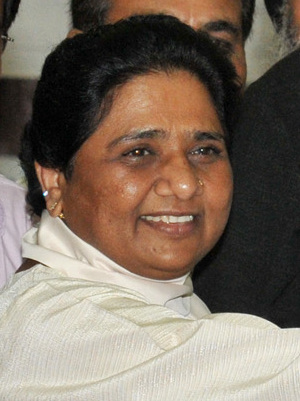
- Mayawati
- Date formed: 3 May 2002
- Date dissolved: 29 August 2003

People and organisations
- Governor: Vishnu Kant Shastri
- Chief Minister: Mayawati
- Member parties: BSP; BJP; RLD; Others
- Status in legislature: Coalition government
- Opposition party: Samajwadi Party
- Opposition leader: Azam Khan (Assembly)

History
- Election: 2002
- Legislature term: 5 years
- Predecessor: Rajnath II
- Successor: Mulayam III

The Third Mayawati ministry was formed on 3 May 2002 in the state of Uttar Pradesh under the leadership of Mayawati as the Chief Minister. This government was formed after the 2002 Uttar Pradesh Legislative Assembly election with outside support from the Bharatiya Janata Party.

The ministry lasted until 29 August 2003 when Mayawati resigned, leading to the formation of the Mulayam Singh Yadav government.

== Background ==
After the 2002 assembly elections in Uttar Pradesh, no party secured a clear majority. The Bahujan Samaj Party, led by Mayawati, formed a coalition government with the support of the Bharatiya Janata Party, the Rashtriya Lok Dal, Akhil Bharatiya Loktantrik Congress, several independents, and smaller allied groups. This broader coalition enabled Mayawati to demonstrate majority support in the Assembly.

Mayawati was sworn in as Chief Minister on 3 May 2002, beginning her third term in office. The coalition ministry included representatives from the BSP, BJP, RLD, and other supporting groups, reflecting a politically diverse alliance formed to secure legislative stability..

The government collapsed in August 2003 after withdrawal of support by the BJP, leading to her resignation.

== Council of Ministers ==
The council of ministers consisted of members from:

- Bahujan Samaj Party
- Bharatiya Janata Party
- Rashtriya Lok Dal
- Akhil Bharatiya Loktantrik Congress
- Others

#	Portrait	Minister	Portfolio	Constituency	Party
Chief Minister
1		Mayawati	General Administration	Harora	BSP
Cabinet Ministers
2		Lalji Tandon	Housing; Urban Development; Tourism; Labour; Panchayati Raj; Medical Education	Lucknow West	BJP
3		Naseemuddin Siddiqui	Transport; Environment; Excise	MLC	BSP
4		Om Prakash Singh	Irrigation; Sugarcane Development; Higher Education; Technical Education; Secondary Education; Language		BJP
5		Kailash Nath Singh Yadav	Science & Technology		BSP
6		Ram Prakash Tripathi	Cooperation		BJP
7		Indrajit Saroj	Social Welfare; SC/ST Welfare; Women Welfare; Child Development & Nutrition	Manjhanpur	BSP
8		Kaukab Hameed Khan	Rural Engineering Services		RLD
9		Swami Prasad Maurya	Khadi & Village Industries		BSP
10		Mahendra Aridaman Singh	Health & Family Welfare		BSP
11		Anuradha Choudhary	Public Works Department		RLD
12		Ramveer Upadhyay	Energy		BSP
13		Sukhdev Rajbhar	Parliamentary Affairs; Waqf; Handloom Industry		BSP
14		Hukum Singh	Agriculture		BJP
15		Lalji Verma	Medical Education		BSP
16		Ravi Gautam	Revenue		BSP
17		Babu Singh Kushwaha	Geology and Mining		BSP
18		Thakur Jaivir Singh	Forest		BSP
19		Baburam M.Com	Food and Civil Supplies		BSP
20		Jagdish Narayan (politician)	Small Scale Industries		BSP
21		Premlata Katiyar	Sugarcane Development and Sugar Industry		BJP
22		Gaya Charan Dinkar	Rural Development		BSP
23		Harishankar Tiwari	Stamp and Court Fees; Entertainment Tax		ABLTC
24		Ram Shankar Pal	Minor Irrigation		BSP
25		Shyam Sundar Sharma	Higher Education		BSP
26		Ved Ram Bhati	Prisons		BSP
27		Phagu Chauhan	Family Welfare		BJP
28		Raj Kishore Singh	Horticulture		BSP
29		Mahendra Singh Yadav	Secondary Education		BSP
30		R. K. Singh Patel	Science and Technology		BSP
31		Rajesh Agrawal	Tax and Registration		BSP

== See also ==
- First Mayawati ministry
- Second Mayawati ministry
- Fourth Mayawati ministry
- Politics of Uttar Pradesh
