= Veer Singh Patel =

Indian politician (born 1980)

Member (MLA) of Uttar Pradesh Legislative Assembly
- In office 2012–2017
- Preceded by: constituency created
- Succeeded by: Chandrika Prasad Upadhyay
- Constituency: Chitrakoot, Uttar Pradesh

Personal details
- Born: 1980 (age 45–46)
- Party: Samajwadi Party
- Spouse: Mamta Patel
- Relations: Bal Kumar Patel (uncle); Ram Singh Patel (cousin)
- Children: 1 Son, 1 Daughter l Ashmit Patel, Aanya Patel
- Parent: Shiv Kumar Patel (Dadua) (father)
- Profession: Politician

Veer Singh Patel (born 1980) is an Indian politician and former MLA representing the Chitrakoot constituency in Uttar Pradesh as a Samajwadi Party member from 2012 to 2017. Prior to becoming a Member of the Legislative Assembly, Veer Singh Patel was unopposed elected as the Jila Panchayat Adhyaksh (Chairman) of Chitrakoot in 2005. He is the son of Dadua (Shiv Kumar Patel) who was killed in 2007.

== Politics ==
Patel got active in politics after his father Dadua died in an encounter with the Uttar Pradesh Police on 22 July 2007.

In 2016, he got into controversy for beating up an officer from the electricity department because the officer didn't agree to forgive or reduce the bills of his supporters.

Patel lost the 2017 and 2022 Uttar Pradesh Legislative Assembly election from Chitrakoot and Manikpur respectively.

He also lost the 2019 Lok Sabha election from Khajuraho. He got just 40,077 votes, while the winner V. D. Sharma of BJP got 8,11,135 votes.

== Criminal charges ==
In his election affidavit of 2022, Patel mentioned that he has 11 criminal cases upon him including kidnapping. Out of 11 cases, he has been convicted in one case in 2009.

== Family ==
His uncle Bal Kumar Patel is a former Lok Sabha MP and Ram Singh Patel (MLA) is his cousin.
