= Ajay Kumar Singh (Uttar Pradesh politician) =

Indian politician

Member of Uttar Pradesh Legislative Assembly
- Incumbent
- Assumed office March 2017
- Preceded by: Raj Kishor Singh
- Constituency: Harraiya

Personal details
- Born: 2 March 1970 (age 56) Amari Bazar, Basti, Uttar Pradesh
- Party: Bharatiya Janata Party
- Spouse: Sunita Singh (m. 2003)
- Children: 2
- Education: MBA; LLB
- Alma mater: University of Lucknow
- Occupation: MLA
- Profession: Advocacy; Business

Ajay Kumar Singh (born 2 March 1970) is an Indian politician and a member of the Legislative Assembly of Uttar Pradesh of India. He represents the Harraiya (Assembly constituency) in the Basti district of Uttar Pradesh and is a member of the Bharatiya Janata Party.

== Early life and education ==
Singh was born 2 March 1970 in Basti district of Uttar Pradesh to father Narendra Bahadur Singh. He received MBA and LLB degrees from University of Lucknow. On 3 February 2003, he married Sunita Singh, with whom he has a son and a daughter. Singh is an advocate by profession.

== Political career ==
Singh started his career in politics in 17th Legislative Assembly of Uttar Pradesh (2017) elections, he contested from Harraiya (Assembly constituency) against Raj Kishor Singh, who is regular three time MLA from this constituency and Cabinet minister in Akhilesh Yadav ministry. However he defeated Samajwadi Party candidate Raj Kishor Singh by a margin of 30,106 votes.

== Posts held ==
#	From	To	Position	Comments
01	March 2017	March 2022	Member, 17th Legislative Assembly of Uttar Pradesh	
02	March 2022	March 2027	Member, 18th Legislative Assembly of Uttar Pradesh	
