= Magarhai =

Village in Uttar Pradesh, India

Magarhai is a village in Chitrakoot, Uttar Pradesh, India.
