= Anil Pradhan =

Member of the Uttar Pradesh Legislative Assembly

Member of Uttar Pradesh Legislative Assembly
- Incumbent
- Assumed office March 2022
- Preceded by: Chandrika Prasad Upadhyay
- Constituency: Chitrakoot

Personal details
- Born: 10 July 1993 (age 33) Chitrakoot, Uttar Pradesh, India
- Party: Samajwadi Party
- Profession: Politician

Anil Pradhan is an Indian politician and a member of the 18th Uttar Pradesh Assembly from the Chitrakoot Assembly constituency of the Chitrakoot district. He is a member of the Samajwadi Party.

== Early life ==
Anil Pradhan was born on 10 July 1993 in Chitrakoot, Uttar Pradesh, to a Hindu family of Bhairon Prasad.

== See also ==
- 18th Uttar Pradesh Assembly
- Chitrakoot Assembly constituency
- Uttar Pradesh Legislative Assembly
