= Tiwari ministry =

Tiwari ministry may refer to:

- Uttar Pradesh Council of Ministers
  - First Tiwari ministry (Uttar Pradesh), the 16th government of Uttar Pradesh headed by N. D. Tiwari from 1976 to 1977
  - Second Tiwari ministry (Uttar Pradesh), the 21st government of Uttar Pradesh headed by N. D. Tiwari from 1984 to 1985
  - Third Tiwari ministry (Uttar Pradesh), the 22nd government of Uttar Pradesh headed by N. D. Tiwari in 1985
  - Fourth Tiwari ministry (Uttar Pradesh), the 24th government of Uttar Pradesh headed by N. D. Tiwari from 1988 to 1989
- Uttarakhand Council of Ministers
  - Tiwari ministry (Uttarakhand), the 3rd government of Uttarakhand headed by N. D. Tiwari from 2002 to 2007

== See also ==
- N. D. Tiwari
