= Harraiya Assembly constituency =

Constituency of the Uttar Pradesh legislative assembly in India

Coordinates: 26.79°N 82.47°E

Harraiya
- Constituency No. 307 for the Uttar Pradesh Legislative Assembly

Constituency details
- Country: India
- Region: North India
- State: Uttar Pradesh
- District: Basti
- Reservation: None

Member of Legislative Assembly
- 18th Uttar Pradesh Legislative Assembly
- Incumbent Ajay Kumar Singh
- Party: Bharatiya Janta Party
- Elected year: 2017

Harraiya is a constituency of the Uttar Pradesh Legislative Assembly covering the city of Harraiya in the Basti district of Uttar Pradesh India.

Harraiya is one of five assembly constituencies in the Basti Lok Sabha constituency. Since 2008, this assembly constituency is numbered 307 amongst 403 constituencies.

== Members of Legislative Assembly ==
Year	Member	Party
1957	Ran Bahadur Singh	Indian National Congress
1962	Ran Bahadur Singh	Indian National Congress
1967	Budhi Ram	Bharatiya Jana Sangh
1969	Lalu	Indian National Congress
1977	Sukhpal Pandey	Janata Party
1980	Surendra Pratap Narayan	Indian National Congress (I)
1985	Sukhpal Pandey	Lokdal
1989	Surendra Pratap Narayan	Indian National Congress
1991	Jagdamba Singh	Bharatiya Janata Party
1993	Jagdamba Singh	Bharatiya Janata Party
1996	Sukhpal Pandey	Bahujan Samaj Party
2002	Raj Kishor Singh	Bahujan Samaj Party
2007	Raj Kishor Singh	Samajwadi Party
2012	Raj Kishor Singh	Samajwadi Party
2017	Ajay Kumar Singh	Bharatiya Janata Party
2022	Ajay Kumar Singh	Bharatiya Janata Party

== Election results ==
=== 2027 ===
2027 Uttar Pradesh Legislative Assembly election: Harraiya
Party	Candidate	Votes	%	±%
INDIA				
NDA				
BSP				
NOTA	None of the above			
Majority				
Turnout				
gain from		Swing		

=== 2022 ===
2022 Uttar Pradesh Legislative Assembly election: Harraiya
Party	Candidate	Votes	%	±%
BJP	Ajay Singh	88,200	39.85	▼5.35
SP	Tarayambak Nath	69,871	31.57	▲0.4
BSP	Raj Kishor Singh	55,697	25.16	▲6.64
INC	Laboni Singh	2,008	0.91	
NOTA	None of the above	1,704	0.77	▼0.3
Majority		18,329	8.28	▼5.75
Turnout		221,334	56.91	▼1.27
BJP hold		Swing		

=== 2017 ===
Currently this seat belongs to Bharatiya Janta Party candidate Ajay Kumar Singh who won in last Assembly election of 2017 Uttar Pradesh Legislative Elections defeating Samajwadi Party candidate Raj Kishor Singh by a margin of 30,106 votes.

2017 General Elections: Harraiya
Party	Candidate	Votes	%	±%
BJP	Ajay Kumar Singh	97,014	45.2	
SP	Raj Kishor Singh	66,908	31.17	
BSP	Vipin Kumar Shukla	39,749	18.52	
RLD	Chandramani Pandey	1,950	0.91	
NOTA	None of the above	2,274	1.07	
Majority		30,106	14.03	
Turnout		214,632	58.18	
BJP gain from SP		Swing	+2.21	

=== 2012 ===
2012 General Elections: Harraiya
Party	Candidate	Votes	%	±%
SP	Raj Kishor Singh	84,409	43.33	−
BSP	Mamta Pandey	64,123	32.91	−
INC	Ajay Kumar Singh	25,607	13.14	−
BJP	Anuradha Chaudhary	10,652	5.47	
	Remainder 12 candidates	10,035	5.15	−
Majority		20,286	10.41	
Turnout		1,94,826	59.00	
SP hold		Swing		
