= Rashtriya Dalit Prerna Sthal and Green Garden =

Monument and museum in Uttar Pradesh, India

Dalit Prerna Sthal and Green Garden
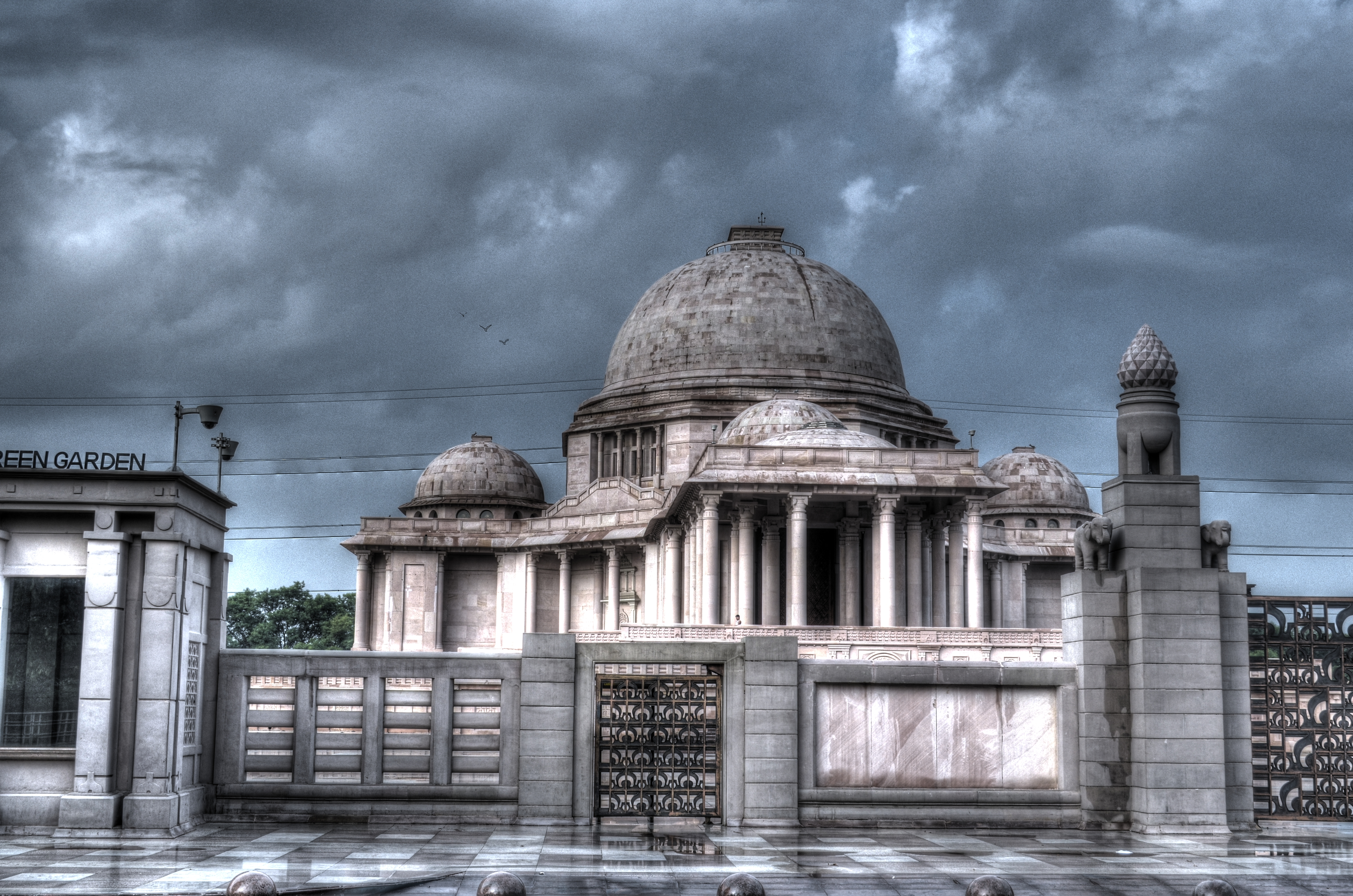
- Entrance of the Dalit Prerna Sthal and Green Garden in 2012
- Interactive map of Dalit Prerna Sthal and Green Garden
- Type: Public, memorial park
- Location: Noida, Uttar Pradesh, India
- Coordinates: 28°34′05″N 77°18′42″E
- Operator: Greater Noida Authority
- Status: Open year round

The Rashtriya Dalit Prerna Sthal and Green Garden is a memorial in Noida, Uttar Pradesh, India. It was commissioned by former Chief Minister of Uttar Pradesh Mayawati and inaugurated on 14 October 2011. Cost of ticket for entry is ₹20 with 7000 visitors every week and 10000 visitors on Ambedkar Jayanti.

== Museum ==
The memorial includes a mini-museum known as the Rashtriya Dalit Smarak (National Dalit Memorial) and a green expanse built on an area of 82.5 acres along the banks of river Yamuna. The Rashtriya Dalit Smarak is spread over 33 acres of land, and includes the idols consecrated for the people who devoted their life for humanity, equality and social justice, including Gautama Buddha, Ravidas, Kabir, Birsa Munda, Periyar, Narayana Guru, Shahu of Kolhapur, B. R. Ambedkar, Jyotirao Phule and Kanshi Ram. It also has twenty-four eighteen-foot high sandstone statues of elephants, the symbol of the Bahujan Samaj Party (BSP). The monument is dedicated to the social reformer and has been constructed to honour the "unparalleled struggle of these stalwarts towards the struggle for social transformation".

== History ==
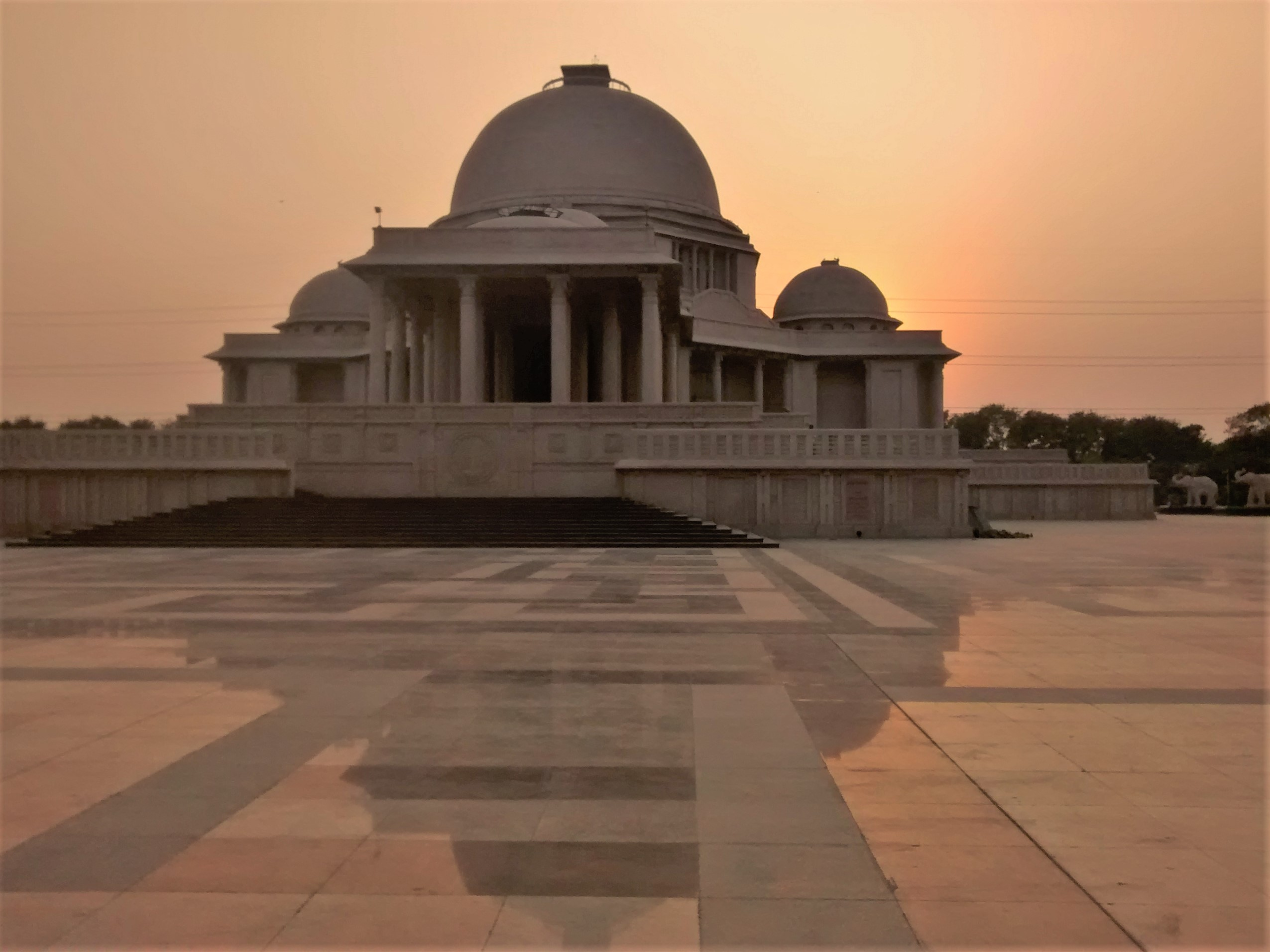
National Dalit Memorial Noida.

=== Construction ===
The park was built at a cost of ₹6.85 billion and the Mayawati government expected to recover the cost from ticket sales. In October 2009, the Supreme Court of India had ordered the Mayawati government to halt construction work, amid concerns that the project might "not be eco-friendly" as it is located near the Okhla Sanctuary. In December 2010, the court withdrew its earlier concerns and the project was allowed to proceed. Since the memorial also featured her own statues, political opponents accused the Chief Minister of being a "megalomaniac", and she was criticized by the Indian National Congress, among whose members would voice accusations of her "wasting the tax-payers' money". Mayawati's BSP dismissed the allegations, stating that her statues were erected because Kanshi Ram's will requests that his statues should be constructed next to the current President of the BSP. Mayawati also accused the Congress of being "anti-Dalit".

== Gallery ==
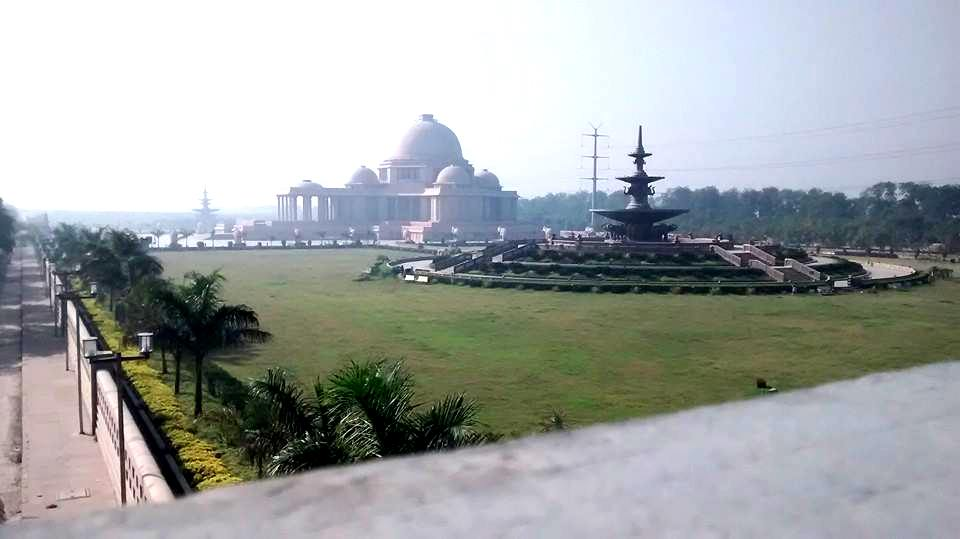
Full view of park

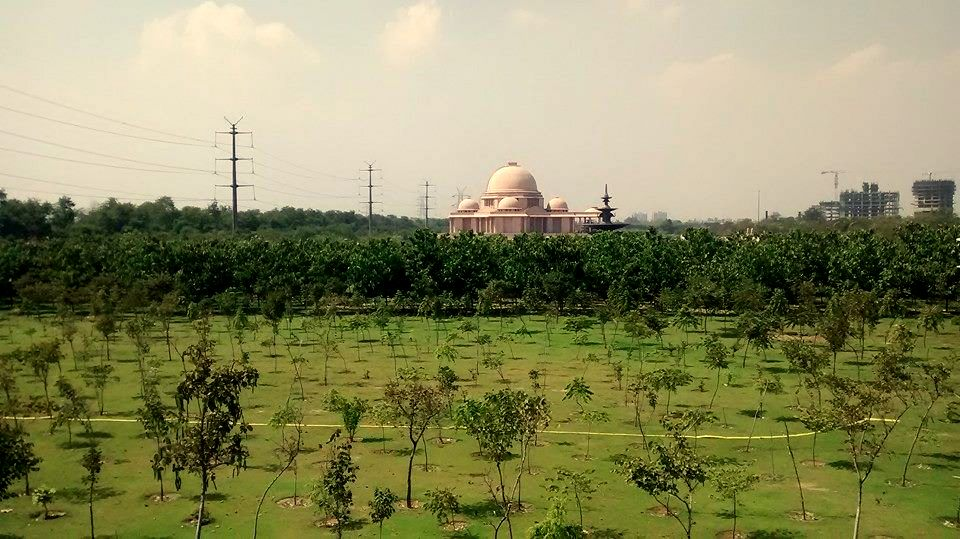
Another View

== See also ==
- Ambedkar Memorial Park
- Manyawar Shri Kanshiram Ji Green Eco Garden
- Shri Guru Ravidas Gurughar, Delhi
