= Mau, Chitrakoot =

Town in Uttar Pradesh, India

Mau
- Town
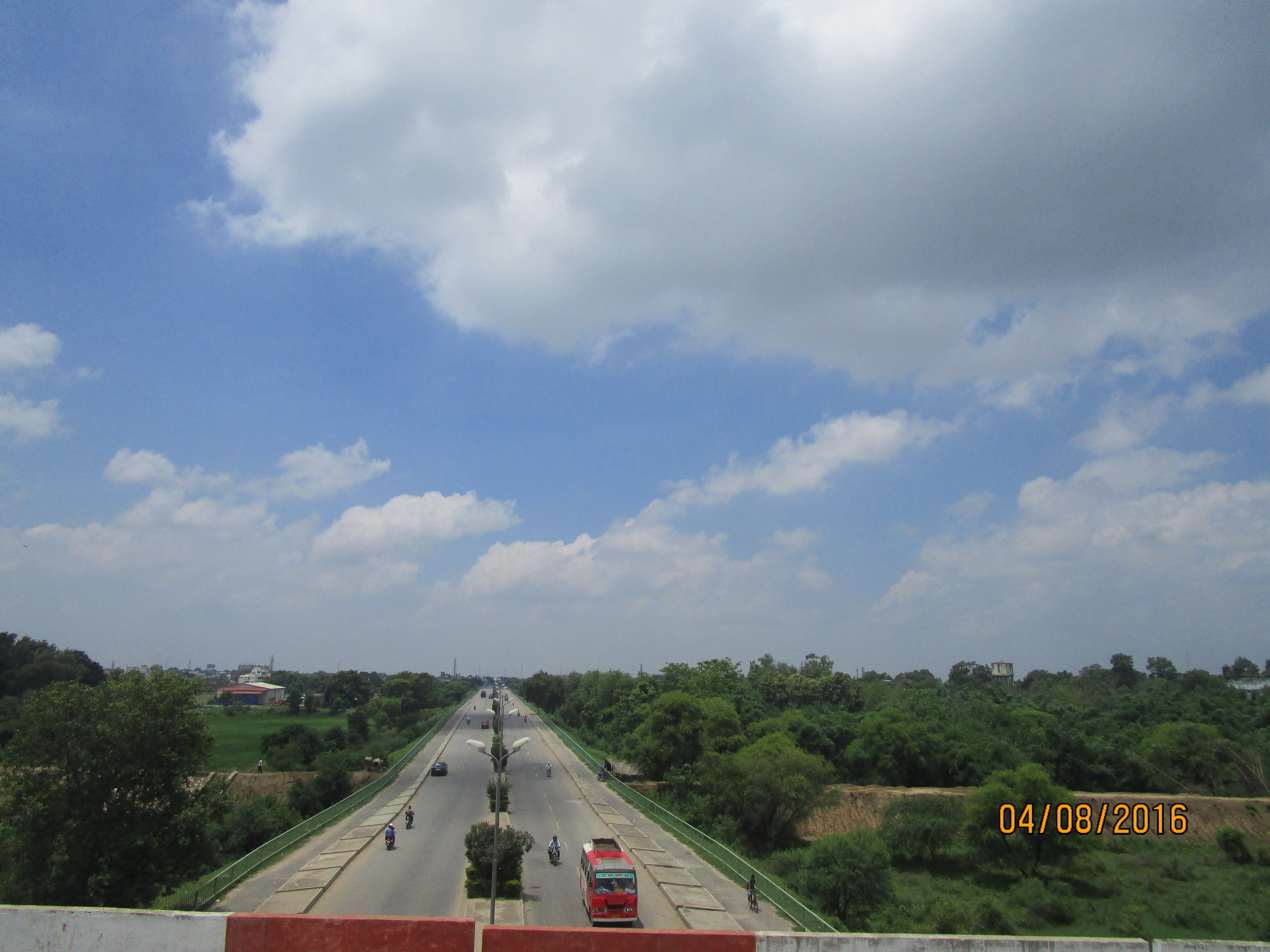
- NH 35 Passing Through Mau

- Location in Chitrakoot, Uttar Pradesh, India Mau (India)
- Coordinates: 25°27′N 81°37′E
- Country: India
- State: Uttar Pradesh
- District: Chitrakoot

Government
  - Body: Government of Uttar Pradesh
- Elevation: 108 m (354 ft)

Population (2011)
  - Total: 15,382

Languages
  - Official: Hindi, Bundeli
- Time zone: UTC+5:30 (IST)
- Postal code: 210207
- Vehicle registration: UP-96
- Website: chitrakoot.nic.in

Mau is town and a Nagar Panchayat in Chitrakoot District of Uttar Pradesh, India. It is also a Tehsil Headquarter.

== Geography ==
Mau is located at 25.27°N 81.37°E. It has an average elevation of 108 m (354 ft). Mau is on the bank of the Yamuna River.

== Demographics ==
Mau has a population of 15,382 of which 8,045 are males while 7,337 are females, according to the 2011 census.

== Transportation ==
The NH 35 passes through Mau and connects it to nearby major cities. Mau is linked by private bus services to all nearest major cities.
