= Raj Kishor Singh =

Indian politician

Cabinet Minister Government of Uttar Pradesh
- In office 2012–2017
- Chief Minister: Akhilesh Yadav
- Ministry & Departments: Horticulture; Minor Irrigation; Animal Husbandry; Panchayati Raj
- In office 2003–2007
- Chief Minister: Mulayam Singh Yadav
- Ministry & Departments: Horticulture
- In office 2002–2003
- Chief Minister: Mayawati
- Ministry & Departments: Horticulture

Member of Uttar Pradesh Legislative Assembly
- In office 2002–2017
- Preceded by: Sukhpal Pandey
- Succeeded by: Ajay Kumar Singh
- Constituency: Harraiya

Member, Basti District Council
- In office 2000–2002

Personal details
- Born: 1 February 1969 (age 57) Changerwa, Mahso, Basti
- Party: Bhartiya Janta Party (May 2024-Present)
- Other political affiliations: Samajwadi Party (2003–2019); Bahujan Samaj Party (2000–2003),(2020–2024); Indian National Congress (2019 –2020)
- Children: 2 sons
- Parent: Anant Singh (father)
- Education: APN PG College, Basti

Raj Kishor Singh is an Indian politician who served as a member of the Uttar Pradesh Legislative Assembly for the state Samajwadi Party from 2002 to 2017. He was a minister for Panchayati raj. Before the government of Mulayam Singh, Mr Singh was also a cabinet minister.

== Early life and education ==
Singh was born 1 February 1969 in Changerwa, Basti, Uttar Pradesh to his father Anant Singh. He married Suman Singh. They have two sons. He belongs to Rajput community. He had B.A. degree from APN Degree College, Basti. His son Devendra Pratap Singh "Sanu" is also President of District council of Basti, and his younger brother Brijkishor Singh "Dimple" is a former Loksabha candidate of Basti Loksabha Constituency from Samajwadi Party.

== Political career ==
Singh was MLA three straight times. He started his political career as a Member of District council in 2000. In 2002 he was also elected Member of the Legislative Assembly from Harraiya as a member of Bahujan Samaj Party but in 2003 he resigned from Bahujan Samaj Party and joined the Samajwadi Party. In Mulayam Singh Yadav cabinet he became a cabinet minister.

In the 2007 election he again represented the Samajwadi Party from Harraiya and he defeated his nearest rival, the Bahujan Samaj Party candidate Anil Singh, by a margin of 5,145 votes.

For third time in 2012, he was again elected three times continuously from Harraiya, he defeated his nearest rival Bahujan Samaj Party candidate Mamata Pandey by a margin of 20,286 votes. He is also cabinet minister of Animal husbandry and Panchayati Raj in Akhilesh Yadav cabinet.

In 17th Legislative Assembly of Uttar Pradesh (2017), he lost to Bhartiya Janta Party candidate Ajay Kumar Singh by a margin of 30,106 votes.

On 9 April 2019 in New Delhi he joined Indian National Congress in presence of General secretary Priyanka Gandhi.

On 3 May 2024 in New Delhi he joined Bhartiya Janta Party in presence of Amit Shah Lucknow.

== Posts held ==
- 2000–2002, Member, District Council
- 2002–2007, Member, 14th Legislative Assembly of Uttar Pradesh (first term)
  - Horticulture Minister (Mayawati cabinet) and (Mulayam Singh Yadav cabinet)
- 2007–2012, Member, 15th Legislative Assembly of Uttar Pradesh (second term)
- 2012–2017, Member, 16th Legislative Assembly of Uttar Pradesh (third term)
  - Minister, Minor Irrigation, Animal Husbandry
  - Minister for Horticulture and Panchayati Raj (Akhilesh Yadav ministry)
