= Ram Singh Patel =

Indian politician

Member (MLA) of Uttar Pradesh Legislative Assembly
- Incumbent
- Assumed office 10 March 2022
- Preceded by: Rajendra Pratap Singh
- In office 2012–2017
- Preceded by: Rajendra Pratap Singh
- Succeeded by: Rajendra Pratap Singh
- Constituency: Patti, Uttar Pradesh

Personal details
- Born: 1 January 1983 (age 43)
- Party: Samajwadi Party
- Relations: Dadua (uncle); Veer Singh Patel (cousin)
- Parent: Bal Kumar Patel (father)
- Education: Feroze Gandhi College, Kanpur University; Narvadeshwar Law College, Lucknow University

Ram Singh Patel (born 1 January 1983) is an Indian politician from Uttar Pradesh. He is a MLA from Patti and has served the same constituency from 2012 to 2017. He lost the 2017 election by a margin of 1,476 votes and has fought all elections as a Samajwadi Party member. In the 2022 Uttar Pradesh Assembly elections, he defeated Bharatiya Janata Party candidate Rajendra Pratap Singh by a margin of 22,051 votes.

== Personal life and education ==
Ram Singh Patel is the son of Bal Kumar Patel, former Lok Sabha MP from Mirzapur. Ram Patel is the nephew of Shiv Kumar Patel (Dadua) who died on 22 July 2007 in a police encounter.

He attended Feroze Gandhi College where he obtained a Master of Arts degree. He also studied at Narvadeshwar Law College, Lucknow and received a Bachelor of Laws degree.
