= Chandrika Prasad Upadhyay =

Indian politician

Minister of State for Public Works Government of Uttar Pradesh
- In office 21 August 2019 – 25 March 2022
- Chief Minister: Yogi Adityanath
- Succeeded by: Brijesh Singh

Member of Uttar Pradesh Legislative Assembly
- In office 2017–2022
- Preceded by: Veer Singh
- Succeeded by: Anil Pradhan
- Constituency: Chitrakoot

Personal details
- Born: 3 January 1950 (age 76) Rasin, Chitrakoot, Uttar Pradesh
- Party: Bharatiya Janata Party
- Spouse: Devika Upadhyay
- Children: 4
- Parent: Rajaram Upadhyay
- Education: University of Allahabad
- Occupation: MLA
- Profession: Politician

Chandrika Prasad Upadhyay is an Indian politician and a member of 17th Legislative Assembly of Uttar Pradesh of India. He represents the Chitrakoot (Assembly constituency) in Chitrakoot district of Uttar Pradesh and is a member of the Bharatiya Janata Party. He was serving as Minister of State for Public Works in Government of Uttar Pradesh.

== Early life and education ==
Upadhyay was born 3 January 1950 in Rasin village of Chitrakoot district of Uttar Pradesh to his father Rajaram Upadhyay. He belongs to Brahmin family. He married Devika Upadhyay, they have two sons Prashant, and Nishant and one daughter Meenakshi. In 1975 he attended Allahabad University and attained Master of Arts degree.

== Political career ==
Upadhyay was Personal Secretary of Dr. Murali Manohar Joshi, who was the Minister of Human Resources from 1998 to 2004. He retired in 2010 from the post of Chief Development officer (CDO) in Kannauj. He then started a career in politics. In 2012 Assembly elections, party gave him ticket from Chitrakoot but he lost the election. He was then made a member of the National Working Committee and vice-chairman of the Bundelkhand Regional Committee.

In 17th Legislative Assembly of Uttar Pradesh (2017) elections, he was elected MLA from Chitrakoot (Assembly constituency). He defeated his nearest candidate Veer Singh (Samajwadi Party), by a margin of 26,430 votes.

On 21 August 2019, after first cabinet expansion of Yogi Adityanath Government he was appointed Minister of State for Public Works.

== Posts held ==
#	From	To	Position	Comments
1	March 2017	March 2022	Member, 17th Legislative Assembly of Uttar Pradesh	
2	August 2019	March 2022	Minister of State in Yogi Adityanath ministry	
