= Vir Bahadur Singh ministry =

Government of Uttar Pradesh, India (1985–88)

- Ministry of Uttar Pradesh
- Date formed: 24 September 1985
- Date dissolved: 24 June 1988

People and organisations
- Chief Minister: Vir Bahadur Singh
- Member party: Indian National Congress

History
- Legislature term: 9th Uttar Pradesh Legislative Assembly
- Predecessor: N. D. Tiwari
- Successor: N. D. Tiwari

The Vir Bahadur Singh ministry was the Council of Ministers in the 9th Uttar Pradesh Legislative Assembly headed by Chief Minister Vir Bahadur Singh of the Indian National Congress from 24 September 1985 to 24 June 1988, in between terms by N. D. Tiwari.

== Council of ministers ==
| Name | Office | Portfolio | Took office | Left office | Party |
|---|---|---|---|---|---|
| Vir Bahadur Singh | Chief Minister | | 24 September 1985 | 24 June 1988 | Indian National Congress |
| Baldev Singh Arya | Cabinet Minister | Revenue | 24 September 1985 | 24 June 1988 | Indian National Congress |
| Lokpati Tripathi | Cabinet Minister | Public Health and Medical | 24 September 1985 | 24 June 1988 | Indian National Congress |
| Swaroop kumari Bakshi | Cabinet Minister | Social Welfare | 24 September 1985 | 24 June 1988 | Indian National Congress |
| Sanjay Singh | Cabinet Minister | Transport | 24 September 1985 | 24 June 1988 | Indian National Congress |
| Narendra Singh | Cabinet Minister | Agriculture | 24 September 1985 | 24 June 1988 | Indian National Congress |
| Shyam Surat Upadhyay | Cabinet Minister | Rural Development and Panchayati Raj | 24 September 1985 | 24 June 1988 | Indian National Congress |
| Arun Kumar Singh | Cabinet Minister | Cooperatives | 24 September 1985 | 24 June 1988 | Indian National Congress |
| Sunil Shastri | Cabinet Minister | Energy | 24 September 1985 | 24 June 1988 | Indian National Congress |
| Sibte Razi | Cabinet Minister | Education and Muslim Waqf | 24 September 1985 | 24 June 1988 | Indian National Congress |
| Hukum Singh | Minister of State | Parliamentary Affairs, Food and Logistics and Animal Husbandary | 24 September 1985 | 24 June 1988 | Indian National Congress |
| Zafar Ali Naqvi | Minister of State | Forest | 24 September 1985 | 24 June 1988 | Indian National Congress |
| Padma Seth | Minister of State | Urban Development | 24 September 1985 | 24 June 1988 | Indian National Congress |
| Shiv Balak Pasi | Minister of State | Agriculture | 24 September 1985 | 24 June 1988 | Indian National Congress |
| Om Prakash Richhariya | Minister of State | Finance and Planning | 24 September 1985 | 24 June 1988 | Indian National Congress |
| Gauri Shankar | Minister of State | Revenue | 24 September 1985 | 24 June 1988 | Indian National Congress |
| Manpal Singh | Minister of State | Food and Logistics | 24 September 1985 | 24 June 1988 | Indian National Congress |
| Ram Naresh Shukla | Minister of State | PWD, Revenue, Law, Home Guards and Freedom Fighters | 24 September 1985 | 24 June 1988 | Indian National Congress |
