= Devkali =

Village in Uttar Pradesh, India

Devkali is a village in Chitrakoot, Uttar Pradesh, India.
