= Manikpur, Chitrakoot =

Manikpur Manikpur
- Town
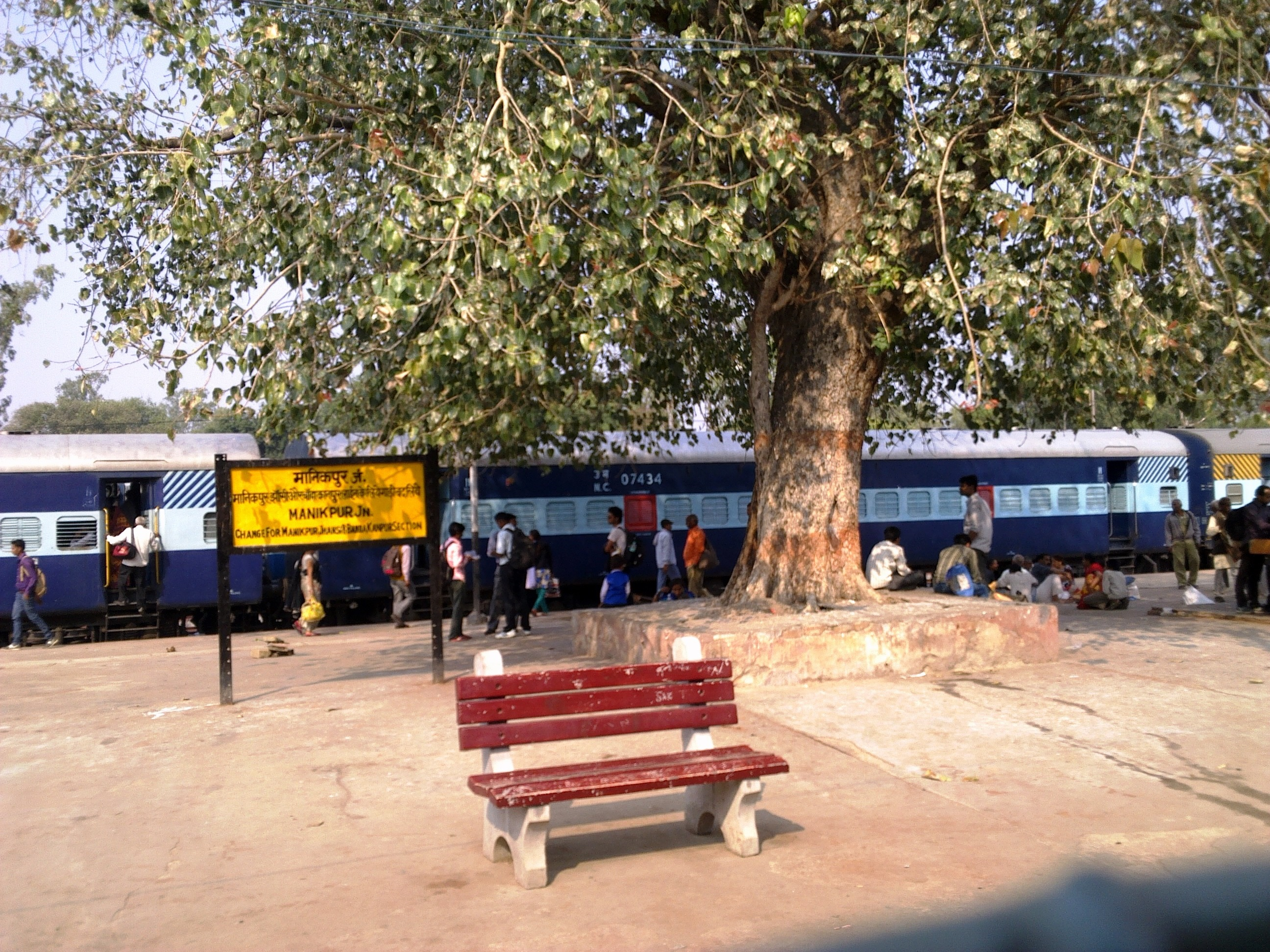
- Manikpur Junction railway station

- Location in Uttar Pradesh, India Manikpur (India)
- Coordinates: 25°04′N 81°06′E
- Country: India
- State: Uttar Pradesh
- District: Chitrakoot

Government
  - Type: NAGAR PANCHAYAT

Population (2011)
  - Total: 16,467

Languages~ Hindi.bandhi.bundelkhandi
  - Official: Hindi
- Time zone: UTC+5:30 (IST)
- Postal code: 210208
- Vehicle registration: UP 96
- Website: up.gov.in

Manikpur is a town in the Indian state of Uttar Pradesh in Chitrakoot district, a nagar panchayat, and Tehsil in the District. It is an important junction on the Jabalpur-Prayagraj railway line.

== Geography ==
Manikpur is located at 25°04′N 81°06′E. It is surrounded by the large Vindhya mountain range.

== Demographics ==
As of the 2011 India census, Manikpur Sarhat had a population of 15,435. Males constitute 53% of the population and females 47%. Manikpur Sarhat has an average literacy rate of 62%, higher than the national average of 59.5%: male literacy is 72%, and female literacy is 50%. In Manikpur Sarhat, 18% of the population is under 6 years of age.

== Transportation ==
- It is an important railway Station in the Jabalpur-Prayagraj Section. One other railway line goes to Jhansi. Many important trains halt in Manikpur.
- Manikpur is connected to Chitrakoot and Rajpur by State Highway and by private bus services to all the nearest major cities.
