= Kanta Kardam =

Indian politician

Member of Parliament, Rajya Sabha
- In office 3 April 2018 – 3 April 2024
- Preceded by: Vinay Katiyar
- Succeeded by: R.P.N Singh
- Constituency: Uttar Pradesh

Personal details
- Born: Hapur
- Party: Bharatiya Janata Party
- Spouse: Veersingh Kardam
- Website: www.bjp.org

Kanta Kardam is an Indian politician. She is a Member of Parliament representing Uttar Pradesh in the Rajya Sabha the upper house of India's Parliament representing the Bharatiya Janata Party.
