= Lakhi Ram Nagar =

Indian businessman and politician

Member of the Uttar Pradesh Legislative Assembly
- In office 2007–2012
- Constituency: Meerut Assembly constituency

Personal details
- Party: Bahujan Samaj Party
- Occupation: Politician

Lakhi Ram Nagar is an Indian businessman and politician from the state of Uttar Pradesh, India. He has been a Minister for Irrigation and a member of the Bahujan Samaj Party, representing the Kharkhoda, Meerut, Meerut, and Kithore assembly constituencies of Uttar Pradesh.

According to his nomination filing, he had 19 crore rupees in cash and had 3 criminal cases against him. Including, assault on people, rioting, and carrying tokens used by public servants with fraudulent intent.
