= Nasimuddin Siddiqui =

Indian politician (born 1959)

19th Leader of the Opposition Uttar Pradesh Legislative Council
- In office 16 March 2012 – 28 March 2017
- Preceded by: Ahmed Hasan
- Succeeded by: Ahmed Hasan

19th Leader of the House Uttar Pradesh Legislative Council
- In office 1 June 2009 – 17 November 2009
- Preceded by: Swami Prasad Maurya
- Succeeded by: Swami Prasad Maurya

Cabinet Minister Government of Uttar Pradesh
- In office 13 May 2007 – 15 March 2012
- Chief Minister: Mayawati
- Ministry & Department's: Excise; Public Works; Irrigation; Housing; Urban Planning; Census; Sugarcane Development
- In office 3 May 2002 – 29 August 2003
- Chief Minister: Mayawati
- Ministry & Department's: Excise; Environment; Transport
- In office 23 September 1997 – 19 October 1997
- Chief Minister: Kalyan Singh
- Ministry & Department's: Agriculture; Excise
- In office 27 March 1997 – 21 September 1997
- Chief Minister: Mayawati
- Ministry & Department's: Agriculture

Member of Uttar Pradesh Legislative Council
- In office 31 January 1997 – 21 July 2020
- Constituency: elected by Legislative assembly members

Member of Uttar Pradesh Legislative Assembly
- In office 22 June 1991 – 4 December 1993
- Preceded by: Jamuna Prasad Bose
- Succeeded by: Raj Kumar Shivhare
- Constituency: Banda

Personal details
- Born: 4 June 1959 (age 67) Banda, Uttar Pradesh, India
- Party: Samajwadi Party (2026–present)
- Other political affiliations: Indian National Congress (2018-2026), Bahujan Samaj Party (1984–2017)
- Spouse: Husna Siddiqui
- Children: 3 sons

Nasimuddin Siddiqui (born 4 June 1959) is an Uttar Pradesh politician and a member of Samajwadi Party, formerly a prominent member of Bahujan Samaj Party. He was expelled by BSP chief Mayawati on 10 May 2017. He became an MLA in Uttar Pradesh Legislative Assembly in 1991. Later he was made a cabinet minister in Mayawati government. He joined Indian National Congress on 22 February at the Congress office, in New Delhi with more than 35,000 of his supporters and several MPs and MLAs of Uttar Pradesh.

== Positions held ==
Year	Description
1991- 1993	Elected to 11th Uttar Pradesh Assembly
