= Chitrakoot, Uttar Pradesh Assembly constituency =

Constituency of the Uttar Pradesh legislative assembly in India

Coordinates: 25.22°N 80.92°E

Chitrakoot
- Constituency No. 236 for the Uttar Pradesh Legislative Assembly

Constituency details
- Country: India
- Region: North India
- State: Uttar Pradesh
- District: Chitrakoot
- Reservation: None

Member of Legislative Assembly
- 18th Uttar Pradesh Legislative Assembly
- Incumbent Anil Pradhan
- Party: Samajwadi Party
- Elected year: 2022

Chitrakoot is a constituency of the Uttar Pradesh Legislative Assembly covering the city of Chitrakoot in the Chitrakoot district of Uttar Pradesh, India.

Chitrakoot is one of five assembly constituencies in the Banda Lok Sabha constituency. Since 2008, this assembly constituency is numbered 236 amongst 403 constituencies.

This seat belongs to Samajwadi party candidate Anil Pradhan who won in last Assembly election of 2022 Uttar Pradesh Legislative Elections defeating BJP candidate Chandrika Prasad Upadhyay by a margin of around 21,000 votes.

== Members of the Legislative Assembly ==
#	Term	Name	Party	From	To	Days	Comments	Ref
1	16th Vidhan Sabha	Veer Singh	Samajwadi Party	March 2012	March 2017	1,829	-	
2	17th Vidhan Sabha	Chandrika Prasad Upadhyay	Bharatiya Janata Party	March 2017	March 2022	3473		
3	18th Vidhan Sabha	Anil Pradhan	Samajwadi Party	March 2022	Incumbent			

== Election results ==
=== 2027 ===
2027 Uttar Pradesh Legislative Assembly election: Chitrakoot
Party	Candidate	Votes	%	±%
INDIA				
NDA				
BSP				
NOTA	None of the above			
Majority				
Turnout				
gain from		Swing		

=== 2022 ===
2022 Uttar Pradesh Legislative Assembly election: Chitrakoot
Party	Candidate	Votes	%	±%
SP	Anil Pradhan	104,771	43.23	▲14.55
BJP	Chandrika Prasad Upadhyay	83,895	34.62	▼6.23
BSP	Pushpendra Singh	38,711	15.97	▼5.63
Jan Adhikar Party	Avinash Chandra Tripathi	2,420	1.0	
NOTA	None of the above	3,290	1.36	▼0.26
Majority		20,876	8.61	▼3.56
Turnout		242,357	64.61	▲2.59
SP gain from BJP		Swing		

=== 2017 ===
2017 Assembly Elections: Chitrakoot
Party	Candidate	Votes	%	±%
BJP	Chandrika Prasad Upadhyay	90,366	40.85	
SP	Veer Singh Patel	63,430	28.68	
BSP	Jagdish Prasad Gautam	47,780	21.6	
CPI	Amit Yadav	3,378	1.53	
NISHAD	Ugrasen	2,679	1.21	
Jan Adhikar Manch	Chhedilal	2,543	1.15	
NOTA	None of the above	3,529	1.62	
Majority		26,936	12.17	
Turnout		221,199	62.02	
BJP gain from SP		Swing	▲5.74	

=== 2012 ===
2012 Assembly Elections: Chitrakoot
Party	Candidate	Votes	%	±%
SP	Veer Singh Patel	65,267	35.78	Steady
BSP	Ram Sevak	49,131	26.93	Steady
BJP	Chandrika Prasad Upadhyay	32,507	17.82	Steady
INC	Pushpendra Singh	18,921	10.37	Steady
CPI	Amit Yadav	4,291	2.35	Steady
	Remainder 8 candidates	12,308	6.74	Steady
Majority		16,136	8.85	Steady
Turnout		1,82,425	60.55	Steady
SP win (new seat)				
