= Patti, Uttar Pradesh Assembly constituency =

Constituency of the Uttar Pradesh legislative assembly in India

Coordinates: 25.92°N 82.20°E

Patti
- Constituency No. 249 for the Uttar Pradesh Legislative Assembly

Constituency details
- Country: India
- Region: North India
- State: Uttar Pradesh
- District: Pratapgarh
- Total electors: 3,66,452
- Reservation: None

Member of Legislative Assembly
- 18th Uttar Pradesh Legislative Assembly
- Incumbent Ram Singh Patel
- Party: Samajwadi Party
- Elected year: 2022

Patti is a constituency of the Uttar Pradesh Legislative Assembly covering the city of Patti in the Pratapgarh district of Uttar Pradesh, India.

Patti is one of five assembly constituencies in the Pratapgarh Lok Sabha constituency. Since 2008, this assembly constituency is numbered 249 amongst 403 constituencies. Patti has more than 350,000 voters. In the 2022 elections, this constituency was won by the Aam Aadmi party.

== Members of Legislative Assembly ==
Year	Member	Party
1957	Ram Kinkar	Indian National Congress
1957	Harikesh Bahadur	Indian National Congress
1962	Ram Kinkar	Indian National Congress
1967	Ram Kinkar	Indian National Congress
1969	Ram Kinkar	Bharatiya Kranti Dal
1974	Prabhakar Nath Dwivedi	Indian National Congress
1977	Rajpati Mishra	Janata Party
1980	Vasudeo Singh	Indian National Congress (I)
1985	Vasudeo Singh	Indian National Congress
1987^	Ajit Pratap Singh	Indian National Congress
1989	Ram Lakhan Yadav	Janata Dal
1991	Shivakant Ojha	Bharatiya Janata Party
1993	Ram Lakhan Yadav	Samajwadi Party
1996	Rajendra Pratap Singh	Bharatiya Janata Party
2002	Rajendra Pratap Singh	Bharatiya Janata Party
2007	Rajendra Pratap Singh	Bharatiya Janata Party
2012	Ram Singh Patel	Samajwadi Party
2017	Rajendra Pratap Singh	Bharatiya Janata Party
2022	Ram Singh Patel	Samajwadi Party

== Election results ==
=== 2027 ===
2027 Uttar Pradesh Legislative Assembly election: Patti
Party	Candidate	Votes	%	±%
INDIA				
NDA				
BSP				
NOTA	None of the above			
Majority				
Turnout				
gain from		Swing		

=== 2022 ===
2022 Uttar Pradesh Legislative Assembly election: Patti
Party	Candidate	Votes	%	±%
SP	Ram Singh Patel	108,070	48.73	+13.36
BJP	Rajendra Pratap Singh	86,019	38.79	+2.71
BSP	Fulchandra	21,482	9.69	−12.64
NOTA	None of the above	1,358	0.61	−0.48
Majority		22,051	9.94	+9.23
Turnout		221,762	60.52	−0.78
SP gain from BJP		Swing		

=== 2017 ===
Bharatiya Janta Party candidate Rajendra Pratap Singh won in 2017 Uttar Pradesh Legislative Elections defeating Samajwadi Party candidate Ram Singh by a margin of 1,476 votes.

2017 Uttar Pradesh Legislative Assembly Election: Patt
Party	Candidate	Votes	%	±%
BJP	Rajendra Pratap Singh Alias Moti	75,011	36.08	
SP	Ram Singh	73,538	35.37	
BSP	Kunwar Shakti Singh	46,427	22.33	
NISHAD	Vijay	3,025	1.45	
NOTA	None of the above	2,244	1.09	
Majority		1,473	0.71	
Turnout		207,923	61.3	
