= Mayawati =

18th Chief Minister of Uttar Pradesh

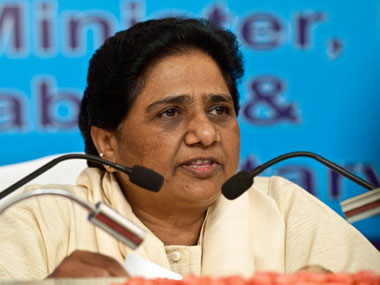
- Mayawati in 2016

National President of the Bahujan Samaj Party
- Incumbent
- Assumed office 18 September 2003
- Preceded by: Kanshi Ram

17th Chief Minister of Uttar Pradesh
- In office 13 May 2007 – 15 March 2012
- Governor: T. V. Rajeswar; Banwari Lal Joshi
- Cabinet: Mayawati IV
- Preceded by: Mulayam Singh Yadav
- Succeeded by: Akhilesh Yadav
- In office 3 May 2002 – 29 August 2003
- Governor: Vishnu Kant Shastri
- Cabinet: Mayawati III
- Preceded by: President's rule
- Succeeded by: Mulayam Singh Yadav
- In office 21 April 1997 – 21 September 1997
- Governor: Romesh Bhandari
- Preceded by: President's rule
- Succeeded by: Kalyan Singh
- In office 3 June 1995 – 18 October 1995
- Governor: Motilal Vora
- Preceded by: Mulayam Singh Yadav
- Succeeded by: President's rule

Member of Parliament, Rajya Sabha
- In office 3 April 2012 – 20 July 2017
- Preceded by: Jai Prakash Rawat
- Succeeded by: Kanta Kardam
- Constituency: Uttar Pradesh
- In office 5 July 2004 – 5 July 2007
- Constituency: Uttar Pradesh
- In office 3 April 1994 – 25 October 1996
- Constituency: Uttar Pradesh

Member of Parliament, Lok Sabha
- In office 2004–2004
- Preceded by: Tribhuvan Dutt
- Succeeded by: Shankhlal Majhi
- Constituency: Akbarpur, Uttar Pradesh
- In office 3 March 1998 – 3 May 2002
- Preceded by: Ghanshyam Kharwar
- Succeeded by: Tribhuvan Dutt
- Constituency: Akbarpur, Uttar Pradesh
- In office 29 November 1989 – 19 June 1991
- Preceded by: Meira Kumar
- Succeeded by: Mangal Ram Premi
- Constituency: Bijnor, Uttar Pradesh

Member of Uttar Pradesh Legislative Council
- In office 28 June 2007 – 12 April 2012
- Constituency: Elected by the MLAs

Member of Uttar Pradesh Legislative Assembly
- In office 2002–2003
- Preceded by: Jagpal
- Succeeded by: Vimla Rakesh
- Constituency: Harora
- In office 2002–2002
- Preceded by: Bheem Prasad
- Succeeded by: Jai Ram Vimal
- Constituency: Jahangirganj
- In office 1996–1998
- Preceded by: Mohar Singh Rathore
- Succeeded by: Jagpal
- Constituency: Harora
- In office 1996–1997
- Preceded by: Yogender Kumar Sagar
- Succeeded by: Bhola Shanker Morya
- Constituency: Bilsi

Personal details
- Born: Kumari Mayawati Das; 15 January 1956 (age 70) New Delhi, Delhi, India
- Party: Bahujan Samaj Party
- Education: University of Delhi (LL.B, B.A); Chaudhary Charan Singh University (B.Ed)
- Occupation: Politician; social worker; lawyer

Kumari Mayawati (born Kumari Mayawati Das; 15 January 1956) is an Indian politician who served as the 18th Chief Minister of Uttar Pradesh from 1995 to 1995, 1997 to 1997, 2002 to 2003 and from 2007 to 2012. She is the national president of the Bahujan Samaj Party (BSP), which focuses on a platform of social change for Bahujans, more commonly known as Other Backward Classes, Scheduled Castes and Scheduled Tribes as well as religious minorities since 2003.

Mayawati had also served as a Member of Parliament, Rajya Sabha from 2012 to 2017 from Uttar Pradesh. Mayawati's rise from humble beginnings has been called a "miracle of democracy" by P. V. Narasimha Rao, former prime minister of India. In 1993, Kanshi Ram formed a coalition with the Samajwadi Party and Mayawati became the Chief Minister of Uttar Pradesh in 1995. She was the first female Scheduled Caste chief minister in India. In 1997 and in 2002 she was chief minister with outside support from the Bharatiya Janata Party (BJP), the second time only for a year up to 26 August 2003 due to BJP withdrawing support.

Mayawati's tenure has attracted praise and criticism. Millions of Dalits across India view her as an icon, and refer to her as Behen-ji (elder sister). She has been praised for her fundraising efforts on behalf of her party and her birthdays have been widely celebrated by her supporters. On the other hand, the rise in her personal wealth and that of her party has been criticised as indicative of corruption.

== Early life and education ==
Mayawati was born as Kumari Mayawati Das on 15 January 1956 at Shrimati Sucheta Kriplani Hospital, New Delhi. Her father, Prabhu Das, was a post office employee at Badalpur village, near Dadri in Gautam Buddha Nagar. The sons in the family were sent to private schools, while the daughters went to "low-performing government schools".

Mayawati studied for her B.A. in 1975 at the Kalindi College, University of Delhi and obtained her LL.B. from the prestigious Faculty of Law, University of Delhi in 1983. She completed a B.Ed. at Meerut University's VMLG College, Ghaziabad, in 1976. She was working as a teacher in Inderpuri JJ Colony, Delhi, and studying for the Indian Administrative Service exams when Kanshi Ram, who at the time was the leader of the All India SC, ST, OBC and Minority Employees Association, visited her family home in 1977. According to biographer Ajoy Bose, Ram told her: "I can make you such a big leader one day that not one but a whole row of IAS officers will line up for your orders." Kanshi Ram included her as a member of his team when he founded the Bahujan Samaj Party (BSP) in 1984. Mayawati was first elected to Parliament in 1989.

== Early political career ==
Kanshi Ram founded the BSP in 1984. Influenced by B. R. Ambedkar, the party's primary focus is to improve the situation of Scheduled Castes and Scheduled Tribes and other disadvantaged groups through policy reform, affirmative action on hiring of members of scheduled castes for government posts, and providing rural development programmes. Reservation in India is a system whereby a percentage of government positions and seats at universities are reserved for persons of backward classes and scheduled castes and tribes. Throughout her political career, Mayawati supported reservation in both government and private sectors for backward classes, with an increase in quotas and inclusion of more communities such as religious minorities and economically weak upper castes. In August 2012 a bill was cleared that starts the process of amending the constitution so that the reservation system can be expanded to promotions in state jobs. Mayawati's career has been called a "miracle of democracy" by former Prime Minister of India P. V. Narasimha Rao. Millions of Dalit supporters view her as an icon and refer to her as "Behen-ji" (sister). Her public meetings have been attended by large audiences, who use slogans such as "Kanshi Ram ka mission Adhoora; karegi Behen Mayawati poora" (Kanshi Ram's unfulfilled mission will be completed by Mayawati) and "Behenji tum sangharsh karo; hum tumhare saath hain" (Sister, go ahead with your struggle; we are with you).

In its first election campaign in 1984, BSP fielded Mayawati for the Lok Sabha (Lower House) seat of Kairana in the Muzaffarnagar district, for Bijnor in 1985, and for Haridwar in 1987. In 1989 she was elected as the representative for Bijnor, with 183,189 votes, winning by 8,879 votes. Although BSP did not win control of the house, the electoral experience led to considerable activity for Mayawati over the next five years, as she worked with Mahsood Ahmed and other organisers. The party won three seats in the 1989 national election and two seats in 1991.

Mayawati was first elected to the Rajya Sabha (Upper House) of Uttar Pradesh (UP) in 1994. In 1995 she became, as head of her party, Chief Minister in a short-lived coalition government, the youngest Chief Minister in the history of the state up until that point, and the first female Dalit Chief Minister in India. She won election to the Lok Sabha in two different constituencies in 1996 and chose to serve for Harora. She became Chief Minister again for a short period in 1997 and then from 2002 to 2003 in coalition with the Bharatiya Janata Party. In 2001 Ram named her as his successor to the party leadership.

On 15 December 2001, in an address during a rally Lucknow, Kanshi Ram named Mayawati as his successor. She was elected national president of the BSP for her first term on 18 September 2003. She was elected unopposed for a second consecutive term on 27 August 2006.

== Chief Minister of Uttar Pradesh ==
As the Chief Minister, Mayawati gained a reputation for efficient governance and promoting law and order, winning praise even from opposition parties and other rivals. In 2007, MP Umakant Yadav of her own political party, accused in a land grabbing case, was arrested near her dwelling on her orders. During September–October 2010, at the time of the Ayodhya verdict, her government maintained law and order and the state remained peaceful. Several high-profile criminals and mafia dons were jailed during her terms in office. She called for strong anti-rape laws. Fewer riots, lowest rapes, and least corruption occurred during her tenure as compared to previous or successive governments. In the 2007–2012 assembly, only 124 MLAs were crorepatis as compared to 271 crorepatis in successive assembly elected in 2012. Uttar Pradesh achieved higher GDP growth rate at 17 per cent and lesser crimes under Mayawati regime as compared to previous and successive governments.

=== First term, 1995 ===
Mayawati first served as Chief Minister from 3 June 1995 to 18 October 1995 with the support of the BJP. During this term, the new districts of Ambedkar Nagar district and Udham Singh Nagar district were created.

=== Second term, 1997 ===
Her second term was from 21 March 1997 to 20 September 1997. A drive under her government allotted pattas or gram sabha lands on lease to thousands of landless residents. In April 1997, she created Gautam Budh Nagar district from the district of Ghaziabad, Kaushambi district was separated from Allahabad district, and Jyotiba Phule Nagar district (now called Amroha district) from Moradabad district. In May 1997, Mahamaya Nagar district (now called Hathras district) was created out of Aligarh district and Banda district was split into Banda and Chatrapati Shahuji Maharaj Nagar. Mayawati carried out review meetings with bureaucrats and suspended 127 officers. She set up the Dr Ambedkar Awards and erected over 100 statues of various sizes of Ambedkar in Lucknow, Kanpur, Allahabad and other key towns.

=== Third term, 2002-2003 ===
Her third term was from 3 May 2002 to 26 August 2003, in which she had the support of the BJP. She suspended 12 IAS officers, including Divisional Commissioners and District Magistrates. Six IPS officers were suspended for failing to maintain law and order, while 24 officers were warned to improve. She started 511 acre Gautam Buddha University. She renamed King George's Medical University to Chhatrapati Shahuji Maharaj Medical University. She suspended three senior officials after review in a couple of administrative divisions.

=== Fourth term, 2007–12 ===
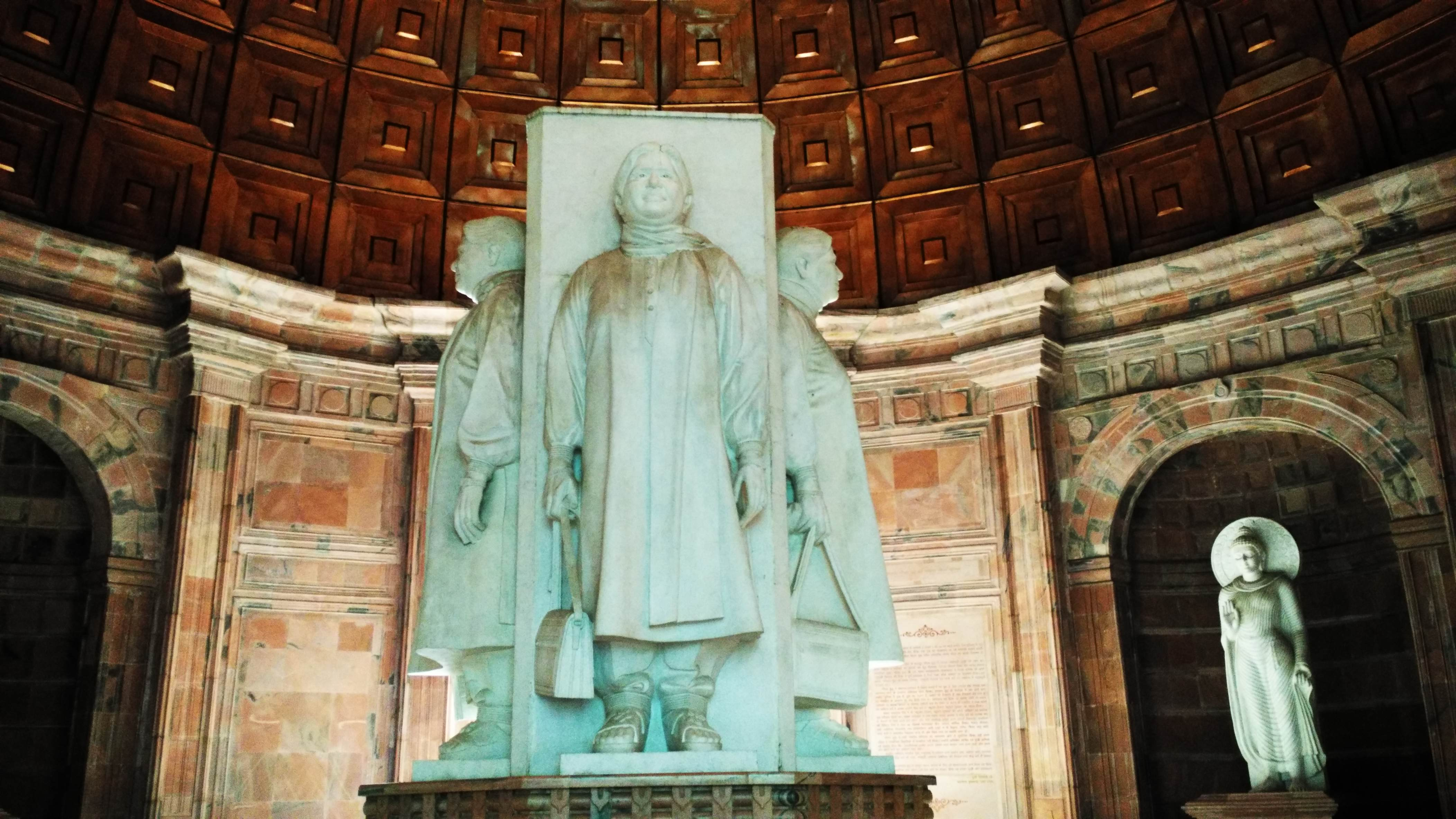
Mayawati's statue Ambedkar Memorial Park.

Uttar Pradesh, India's most populous state and one of its poorest, is considered pivotal in the politics of India because of its large number of voters. BSP won a majority in the 2007 Uttar Pradesh Assembly elections, due to the support of the Brahmins. The campaign was accompanied by a colourful slogan: Haathi nahin, Ganesh hain, Brahma, Vishnu, Mahesh Hain: "The elephant (the BSP logo) is really the Lord Ganesha, the trinity of gods rolled into one". 37 per cent Brahmins voted for the party.

Mayawati was sworn in as Chief Minister of Uttar Pradesh for the fourth time on 13 May 2007. She announced an agenda that focused on providing social justice to the weaker sections of society and providing employment instead of distributing money to the unemployed. Her slogan was to make "Uttar Pradesh" ("Northern Province") into "Uttam Pradesh" ("Excellent Province"). Her government began a major crackdown on irregularities in the recruitment process of police officers recruited during the previous Mulayam Singh government. Over 18,000 policemen lost their jobs for irregularities in their hiring, and 25 Indian Police Service officers were suspended for their involvement in corruption while recruiting the constables. Mayawati instituted reforms to introduce transparency into the recruiting process, including posting the results of selection exams online.

On 10 August 2007, the Mayawati government proposed 30 per cent reservation in jobs in the private sector. A quota for promotions was also introduced, but was later quashed by the Supreme Court of India. In September 2007, Bhimrao Ambedkar Rural Integrated Development Programme was started. The Dr Ambedkar Gram Vikas Yojana scheme was launched for supplying water, electricity, and constructing roads in villages with a Dalit majority. Under this scheme, 24,716 villages received improvements.

In 2008, Mayawati launched, Manyawar Shri Kanshiram Ji Shahri Garib Awas Yojna, a scheme for building low-cost housing colonies for urban poor with 90,000 low-cost homes under the first round of construction in different towns and cities across the state while a second and a third round were still underway when government ended in 2012 and next government scrapped the scheme including cutting down electricity of these colonies.

Mayawati government started efforts to set up solar power plants and the first 5 MW solar power plant located in Naini of Allahabad district started functioning in March 2012 and was developed by EMC Limited. UP government signed a MoU with NTPC Limited for 1,320-MW power plant. Mayawati's dream project of 165 km six lane Yamuna Expressway connected Delhi to Agra through Noida–Greater Noida Expressway, touching 1,182 villages in the state. Later, Indian Air Force fighter jet Dassault Mirage 2000 test-Landed on Yamuna Expressway as Part of Trials. On 15 January 2008, Mayawati inaugurated the construction of the 1,047 km Ganga Expressway at the cost of ₹30,000 crore (US$3.2 billion) for joining Ballia to Greater Noida. In 2008, her government established Dr. Shakuntala Misra National Rehabilitation University for the Physically challenged students. In November 2009, Mayawati dedicated Noida Metro constructed at the cost of ₹557 crore (US$60 million). She had vigorously proposed for construction of Jewar airport near Noida. In October 2011, Mayawati government under public-private partnership with Jaypee Group successfully executed and delivered First F1 Indian Grand Prix, an international event at Buddh International Circuit, Greater Noida constructed by Jaypee Group. The event was hailed as flawlessly conducted salvaging some of India's prestige when compared to minor embarrassments in 2010 Commonwealth Games (Before opening ceremony) conducted in Delhi. Mayawati presented the winning trophy to winner Sebastian Vettel. Foreigners found the track as 'impressive' and 3 Indian teenagers picked by a F1 panel to train them as future Formula One drivers in Europe.

Mayawati has seen through to completion of several memorials dedicated to icons of Bahujan Samaj build first time in India, including the Manyawar Shri Kanshiram Ji Green Eco Garden (inaugurated March 2011), the Rashtriya Dalit Prerna Sthal and Green Garden (inaugurated October 2011), and the Ambedkar Memorial Park (opened November 2012). She renamed Amethi district as Chattrapati Sahuji Maharaj Nagar, Kanpur Dehat as Rambai Nagar, Sambhal as Bheem Nagar, Shamli as Prabuddha Nagar, Hapur as Panchsheel Nagar, Kasganj as Kanshiram Nagar, Hathras as Mahamaya Nagar and Amroha as JP Nagar.

Mayawati during her tenure directed all the Commissioners and the District Magistrates to distribute 3 acre land pieces or pattas to weaker sections of society by launching special drive for illegal possesses of pattas be dispossessed of them and the eligible poor be identified by regular monitoring of pattas and strict action against the mafias and musclemen through spot verification of different development and public welfare programmes. In 2010, 5596 people belonging to the SC and ST communities were allotted 1054.879 hectares of agriculture land. In a special drive 74 FIRs were filed and 88 people were arrested for illegal occupation from agricultural land. Sugar Information Service a model website supported by SMS and IVRS facility was developed. Mayawati dedicated the ₹63.5 crore (US$6.8 million) 286-bed super-specialty Centenary hospital in Lucknow and 50-bed critical care unit at CSMMU and increased salaries of doctors. Mayawati, in 2007, launched ₹500 crore (US$53 million) Manyawar Kanshiram Multi-speciality Hospital in Greater Noida which started its OPD services in April 2013. Mayawati government also spent ₹510 crore (US$54 million) on Dr. B.R. Ambedkar Multi Speciality Hospital in Sector 30 of Noida.

Her government also instituted Sant Ravidas Kala Samman Award with a cash prize of ₹1.25 lakh (US$1,300). Under Savitri Bai Phule Balika Shiksha Madad Yojna, Mayawati distributed over 10 lakh bicycles among Muslim and poor school girls from 2008 to 2011.

A geographical comparison of Mayawati's bifurcation plan of Uttar Pradesh compared to that of Ambedkar's.

After coming to power in 2007, Mayawati wrote letters to the Prime Minister regarding partitioning of Uttar Pradesh into four different states in 2007, in March 2008 and December 2009. Finally on 15 November 2011, Mayawati's cabinet approved partitioning Uttar Pradesh into four different states (Pashchim Pradesh, Awadh Pradesh, Bundelkhand and Purvanchal) for better administration and governance.

On 6 March 2012 the Bahujan Samaj Party lost its majority to the Samajwadi Party and Mayawati tendered her resignation to the governor of Uttar Pradesh the next day, thereby becoming the first CM to complete five full years in office. On 13 March 2012 she filed nomination papers for the Rajya Sabha, and she was declared elected unopposed on 22 March.

=== Later career ===
She was elected as the BSP president for a third term on 30 August 2014 and for fourth term on 28 August 2019.

On 10 December 2023 Mayawati named nephew Akash Anand as her successor. However, he was sacked immediately after his comments on the ruling Bharatiya Janata Party.

In recent years, the party has seen a decline in popularity in both state and national elections, with key figures within the BSP defecting and election results declining.

== Political and legal issues ==
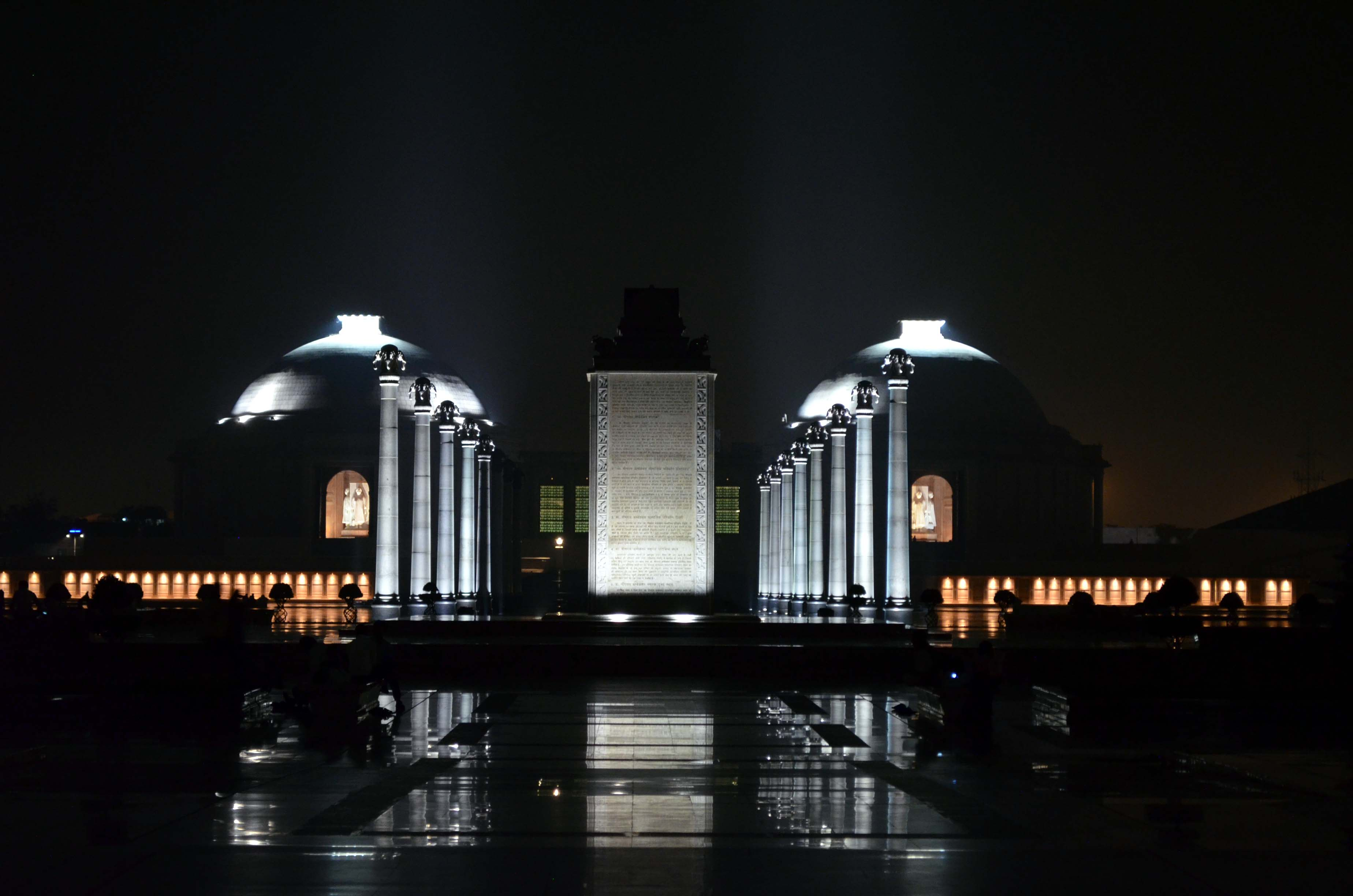
Ambedkar Memorial Park at night

Mayawati's political career has attracted praise and controversy. She has been praised for her fundraising efforts on behalf of her party, and her birthdays were major media events as well as a symbol for her supporters. The increase in her personal wealth and that of her party have been viewed by critics as signs of corruption.

=== Taj corridor ===
In 2002, the government of Uttar Pradesh began improvements of the infrastructure in the Taj Heritage Corridor, the important tourist area in Agra that includes the Taj Mahal. The project was soon riddled with problems, including funds being released for the project without the submission of the required detailed project reports to the environmental authorities. Suspecting there were financial irregularities as well, the Central Bureau of Investigation (CBI) raided twelve residences, including Mayawati's. It had filed a First Information Report against her and seven others two days earlier. The raid uncovered evidence of assets disproportionate to her known income. Afterwards, Mayawati resigned from her own government to prove that she was not "hungry for power" She asked the BJP-run Government of India to remove Union Tourism and Culture Minister, Jagmohan for conspiring this all controversy against her.

In June 2007, Governor T. V. Rajeswar said that there was insufficient evidence to prosecute her. In his 23-page order, he said: "the fact that the Mission Management Board, consisting of officers of both the State and the Central Government, regularly met and discussed the project and the fact that even a sum of ₹ 170,000,000 (17 crores) was spent through the Central Government public sector undertaking, NPCC, all go to show that the serious offences with which Mayawati and the Minister were charged do not stand scrutiny." Advocates unsuccessfully challenged the governor's decision in court. The Supreme Court rejected the plea of the CBI and refused to direct the governor to prosecute her. The Taj corridor case was effectively ended before going to trial.

=== Disproportionate assets case ===
In the 2007–08 assessment year, Mayawati paid an income tax of ₹26 crore, ranking among the top 20 taxpayers in the country. Earlier the CBI filed a case against her for owning assets disproportionate to her known sources of income. Mayawati described the CBI investigation against her as illegal. Her party asserted that her income comes from gifts and small contributions made by party workers and supporters.

On 3 August 2011 the Delhi High court dismissed the central government's appeal against Mayawati, stating that "she has fully discharged her obligations by disclosing the identities of all of her donors, the gifts had been donated by her supporters". The central government decided not to file an appeal in the Supreme Court. On 13 March 2012 Mayawati revealed assets worth ₹ 111.26 crore in an affidavit filed with her nomination papers for the Rajya Sabha. The disproportionate assets case was finally quashed on 6 July 2012—nine years later—by a Supreme Court bench of Justice P Sathasivam and Dipak Misra; the court found that the case was unwarranted. Based on an opinion received from the Directorate of Prosecution, the CBI decided not to file an appeal. On 4 October 2012 a review petition was filed by Kamlesh Verma, contending that the case had been dismissed merely on technical grounds, and that the evidence had not been adequately reviewed. On 8 August 2013 the Supreme Court declined a request to re-open the case. After seeking legal advice, the CBI finally closed their file on 8 October 2013.

=== Bahujan monuments ===
In her tenures as a Chief Minister, Mayawati commissioned the production and public display of several monuments having parks, gallerias, museums, memorials, murals and statues representing Buddhist and Hindu, Dalit/OBC icons like Gautama Buddha, Gadge Maharaj, Ravidas, Kabir, Narayana Guru, Jyotirao Phule, Shahu IV, B. R. Ambedkar, BSP party founder Kanshi Ram, and of herself. She claims that the expenditure was required because the past governments did not show respect towards Dalit leaders, in whose memory nothing had ever been built. She spent somewhere between ₹2,500 and 6,000 crore (about US$500 million to US$1.3 billion) on projects in five parks and at memorials such as the Ambedkar Memorial Park and Manyavar Kanshiram Smarak Sthal, built in the name of B.R. Ambedkar, Ramabai Ambedkar, and Kanshi Ram in Lucknow between 2007 and 2009. The Comptroller and Auditor General of India reported that ₹ 66 crore (about US$12 million) in excessive costs had been incurred on the construction of the memorials. In February 2010 Mayawati's government approved a plan for a special police force to protect the statues, as she feared that her political opponents might demolish them. In December 2010, her government received permission to continue part of the plan, namely maintenance and completion of Ambedkar Memorial Park.

Despite the existing Supreme Court stay, in October 2011 Mayawati inaugurated the Rashtriya Dalit Prerna Sthal and Green Garden, built at a cost of ₹685 crore. Since the memorial also features her own statues, Mayawati was accused by the Indian National Congress of wasting the taxpayers' money. The BSP dismissed the allegations, stating that her statues were erected because Kanshi Ram's will requested that his statues should be constructed next to those of the current President of BSP. Mayawati accused the Congress of being "anti-Dalit".

In January 2012, the Election Commission ordered that all of the statues of Mayawati as well as recent statues of elephants (the symbol of the Bahujan Samaj Party) should be covered up until after February's Uttar Pradesh election. On 26 July 2012 the statue in Lucknow was damaged by members of a group calling themselves "Uttar Pradesh Naunirman Sena". A replacement statue was re-installed overnight by the Lucknow city administration. Following the Lucknow vandalism, there were similar such incidents in other parts of Uttar Pradesh.

=== World Bank criticism ===
The World Bank lent India funds for development, and Mayawati was to manage projects with this money in UP. The projects were preplanned and on schedule, but the Mayawati government made changes which put the projects behind schedule, including rapidly transferring upper caste managers in and out of rural posts. The World Bank sent a letter of complaint on 1 August 2002 to India's central government stating, "We have now learnt that project managers have been replaced within three weeks of assuming office. The project coordinator of the Diversified Agriculture Support Project has been changed twice in quick succession and at the moment there is no project coordinator. In the forestry project, numerous changes have been made over past six months ... Such developments do not augur well for these time-bound projects that require consistently good leadership." Mayawati initially responded by saying the letter was a fake and later said there had been a misunderstanding. She then decreased the number of transfers, stopped creating new posts, and temporarily reduced the level of government spending on furniture and vehicles in response to the allegations. The World Bank continued to criticise the level of corruption even after these measures had been implemented.

== Positions held ==
Kumari Mayawati has been elected three times as Rajya Sabha MP and four times as Lok Sabha MP.

As per the election affidavit of 2012 (Rajya Sabha), Mayawati has assets worth ₹111.64 crores and liabilities worth ₹87.68 lakhs (0.87 crores).

#	From	To	Position	Party
1.	1989	1991	MP (1st term) in 9th Lok Sabha from Bijnor	Bahujan Samaj Party
2.	1994	1996	MP (1st term) in Rajya Sabha from Uttar Pradesh (resigned in Oct 1996)	Bahujan Samaj Party
3.	1996	1997	MLA (1st term) in 13th Vidhan Sabha from Harora (resigned in 1996) and Bilsi (resigned in 1997)	Bahujan Samaj Party
4.	1998	1999	MP (2nd term) in 12th Lok Sabha from Akbarpur	Bahujan Samaj Party
5.	1999	2002	MP (3rd term) in 13th Lok Sabha from Akbarpur (resigned in 2002)	Bahujan Samaj Party
6.	2004	2004	MP (4th term) in 14th Lok Sabha from Akbarpur (resigned in July 2004)	Bahujan Samaj Party
7.	2004	2007	MP (2nd term) in Rajya Sabha from Uttar Pradesh (resigned in July 2007)	Bahujan Samaj Party
8.	2007	2012	Chief Minister (4th term) in Government of Uttar Pradesh	Bahujan Samaj Party
9.	2007	2012	MLC in Uttar Pradesh Legislative Council (resigned in 2012)	Bahujan Samaj Party
10.	2012	2017	MP (3rd term) in Rajya Sabha from Uttar Pradesh (resigned in July 2017)	Bahujan Samaj Party

== Personal life and public image ==
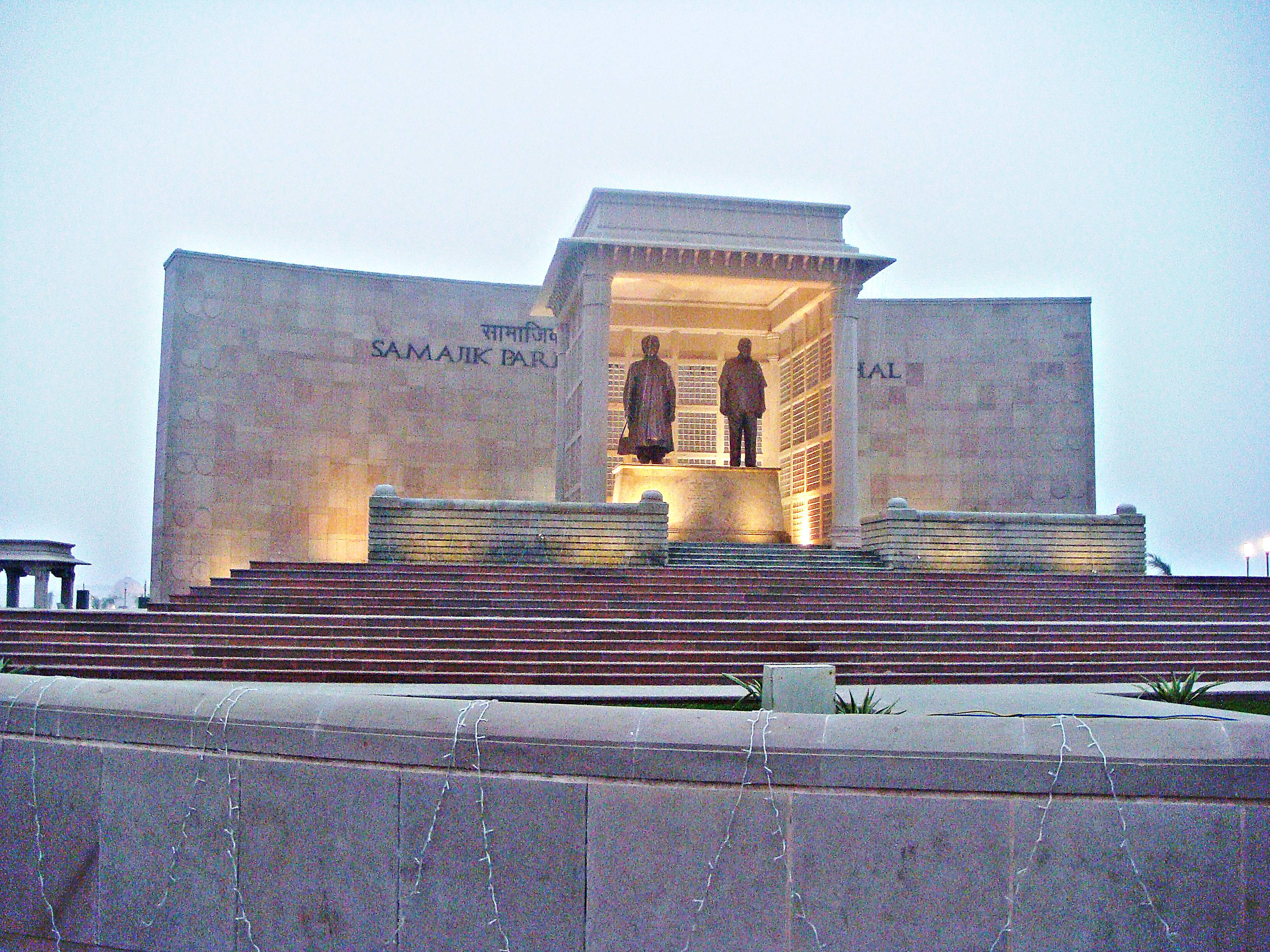
Statues of Mayawati (L) and Kanshi Ram (R) at Ambedkar Memorial Park

Mayawati started her political career after Kanshi Ram, the founder of Bahujan Samaj Party, persuaded her not to join the civil service, but to enter politics. Mayawati chose to remain unmarried. She is also known as Iron Lady.

Kanshi Ram praised Mayawati at her 47th birthday celebrations for her fundraising activities on behalf of the party. He stated that the party's eventual goal is to gain power at the national level, and that Mayawati's efforts had helped in that quest. Her birthdays have since become major media events at which she has appeared laden with diamonds. Her supporters have declared her birthday as Jan Kalyankari Diwas (People's Welfare Day). In 2009, the day was marked by the announcement of welfare schemes targeted towards poor and downtrodden people of the state and, in 2010, by the launch of social programmes with a value of over ₹ 7,312 crore.

In 2007–08, Mayawati paid ₹26.26 crore (US$2.8 million) as income tax. She was at number 20 in the I-T department's compilation of the top 200 taxpayers' list with names like Shah Rukh Khan and Sachin Tendulkar. Mayawati paid ₹15 crore (US$1.6 million) in advance tax in April–December 2007. She paid ₹12.5 crore (US$1.3 million) on other incomes, most of which was declared by her as "gifts" by party members.

When BSP workers garlanded Mayawati with currency notes on the occasion of the party's silver jubilee celebrations coinciding with BSP founder Kanshi Ram's birth anniversary on 15 March 2010, Indian news channels and newspapers purported to expose the event as a ‘scandal’ on the presumption that the Chief Minister had publicly committed an act of corruption that was being flaunted openly and declaring that the garland of currency notes was made from money through corrupt means and not from donations of Bahujan Samaj Party supporters as Mayawati, her Ministers and supporters claimed. At Kanshi Ram's funeral ceremonies in 2006, Mayawati stated that both Kanshi Ram and herself had been, and she would continue to be, observant of Buddhist traditions and customs. She has stated her intention to formally convert to Buddhism when the political conditions enable her to become Prime Minister of India. Her act of performing the last rites (traditionally done by a male heir) was an expression of their views against gender discrimination. When she was Chief Minister of Uttar Pradesh, she publicly called Bhikkhus to prayer.

== Literature about Mayawati ==
Literature about Mayawati includes studies and books. One of the first works about her was journalist Mohammad Jamil Akhter's book, Iron Lady Kumari Mayawati. Her autobiographies are Mere Sangarshmai Jeevan Evam Bahujan Movement Ka Safarnama in three volumes in Hindi and A Travelogue of My Struggle-ridden Life and of Bahujan Samaj, in two volumes in English. Behenji : A Political Biography of Mayawati is a biography by veteran journalist Ajoy Bose.

== Awards and recognition ==
In 2003, Mayawati as the Chief Minister, was awarded Paul Harris Fellow Award by UNICEF, World Health Organization and Rotary International, for her initiative in Polio eradication. Mayawati was also honoured with Rajarshi Shahu Award by Rajarshi Shahu Memorial Trust. In 2008, Forbes added Mayawati in the 59th place on its list of the 100 most powerful women in the world. She appeared in Newsweek's top woman achievers list in 2007. In 2009 a Newsweek article described her as the Barack Obama of India, and a potential candidate for Prime Minister. Time magazine included Mayawati in India's 15 Most Influential list for 2007.

== See also ==
- Dalit Shoshit Samaj Sangharsh Samiti
- Third Mayawati ministry
- Fourth Mayawati ministry
- BAMCEF
- Bahujan Volunteer Force
- Jai Bhim
- Bhim Army

Lok Sabha
Preceded by Rampiyare Suman	Member of Parliament for Ambedkar Nagar; 1989 – 1991	Succeeded by Ram Awadh
Preceded by Ghanshyam Chandra Kharvar	Member of Parliament for Ambedkar Nagar; 1998 – 2002	Succeeded by Ram Awadh
Preceded by Tribhuvan Dutt	Member of Parliament for Ambedkar Nagar; 2004 – 2007	Succeeded by Shankhlal Majhi
Rajya Sabha
Preceded by N/A	Member of Parliament for Rajya Sabha (Uttar Pradesh); 3 April 1994 – 25 October 1996	Succeeded by Dara Singh Chauhan
Preceded by N/A	Member of Parliament for Rajya Sabha (Uttar Pradesh); 5 July 2004 – 5 July 2007	Succeeded by N/A
Preceded by Jai Prakash	Member of Parliament for Rajya Sabha (Uttar Pradesh); 3 April 2012 – 20 July 2017	Succeeded by Kanta Kardam
Political offices
Preceded by Mulayam Singh Yadav	Chief Minister of Uttar Pradesh; 13 June 1995 – 18 October 1995	Succeeded by President's Rule
Preceded by President's Rule	Chief Minister of Uttar Pradesh; 21 March 1997 – 21 September 1997	Succeeded by Kalyan Singh
Preceded by President's Rule	Chief Minister of Uttar Pradesh; 3 May 2002 – 29 August 2003	Succeeded by Mulayam Singh Yadav
Preceded by Mulayam Singh Yadav	Chief Minister of Uttar Pradesh; 13 May 2007 – 7 March 2012	Succeeded by Akhilesh Yadav
Party political offices
Preceded by Kanshi Ram	National President; Bahujan Samaj Party; 18 September 2003 – present	Incumbent
