= Rajapur, Uttar Pradesh =

Rajapur
- Town
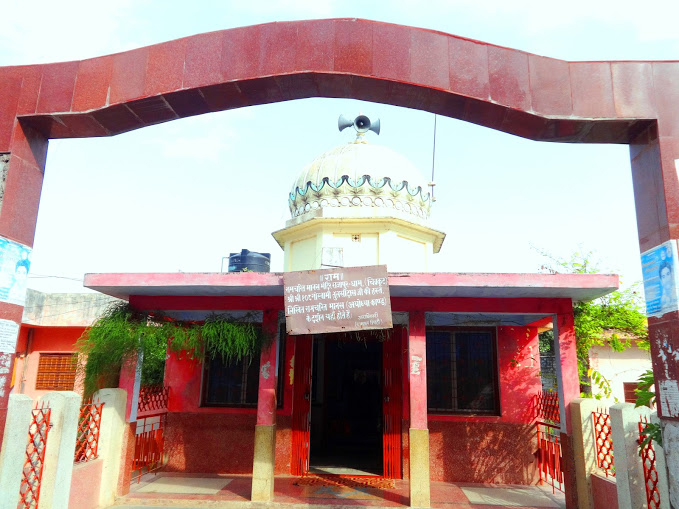
- Handwritten Ramcharitmanas in Ramayana Temple Rajapur UP
- Nickname: Tulsi Dhaam
- Location in Chitrakoot, Uttar Pradesh, India Rajapur (India)
- Coordinates: 25°23′N 81°09′E
- Country: India
- State: Uttar Pradesh
- District: Chitrakoot

Government
  - Body: Government of Uttar Pradesh
- Elevation: 108 m (354 ft)

Population (2011)
  - Total: 13,439

Languages
  - Official: Hindi, Bundeli
- Time zone: UTC+5:30 (IST)
- Postal code: 210207
- Vehicle registration: UP-96
- Website: chitrakoot.nic.in

Rajapur is a town (Nagar Panchayat) and tehsil of Chitrakoot district in the Indian state of Uttar Pradesh. It is situated along the bank of the river Yamuna. It has the nickname "Tulsi Dhaam" after the Hindi poet Goswami Tulsidas, who is the writer of holy "Ram Charit Manas" along with many other religious books of Hindus. There is a temple here, devoted to Tulsidas, where part of the original "Handwritten Scripture" of Ramcharitmanas is still available. Rajapur is linked with Kaushambi district on the opposite bank of the river Yamuna.

== Tourist attractions ==
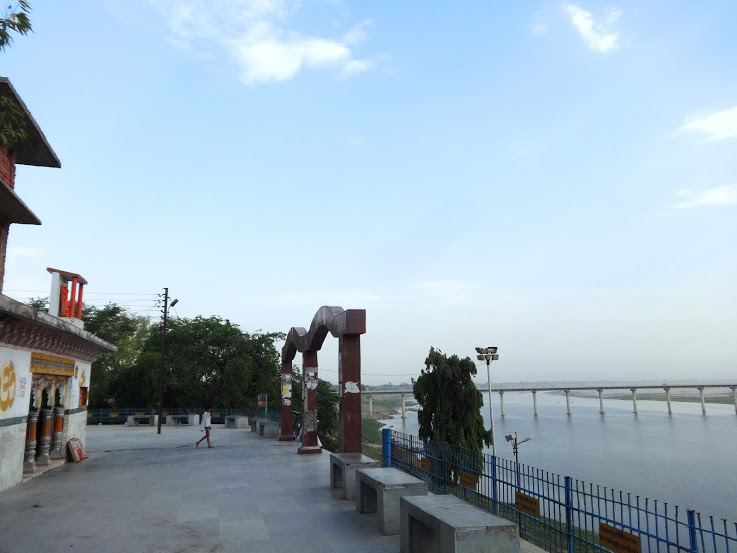
Tulsighat, Rajapur, UP

Places like Hanuman ji temple, Tulsighat, Tulsi smarak are some of the places of interest in the town for local people as well as people from nearby villages and cities. Being the birthplace of saint poet Goswami Tulsidas, it is visited by many other people from all parts of the country. Chitrakoot, a district headquarter that is also a tourist attraction is 50 km from Rajapur. Apart from this, there is a place called Nadi taura, 18 km from Rajapur, where a hanuman ji temple is situated.

== Demographics ==
As per the 2011 Census of India, Rajapur had a population of 17,439. Out of it 97% are Hindu and 2.28% are Muslims. Rajapur has an average literacy rate of 70.38%, male literacy rate is 77.98% and female literacy rate is 61.73%. In Rajapur, 20% of the population is under 6 years of age.

== Education ==
=== Higher Education ===
- Sri Tulsi Smarak Sanskrit Mahavidhalaya, Rajapur
- Sri Kedarnath Jagannath Mhavidhalaya, khatwara, Rajapur
- Sri Kedarnath Ramswarup Mhavidhalaya, Khatwara, Rajapur
- Sri Vashishth Narayan Karwariya Mhavidhalaya, Rajapur (Permanent Close in 2024).

=== Schools ===
- Govt. Girls Inter College
- Sri Tulsi Inter College
- Dhirendra Inter College
- Jitendra Higher Secondary School
- Primary School Rajapur
- Sarswati Shishu Vidhya Mandir, Khatwara road, Rajapur
- S.M. Public School
- Angel English Medium School
- Vashishtha Gurukulam (CBSE)

=== Degree College and Professional Courses ===
There is need for government degree College so as to help students of the region to get good quality higher education.

== Transportation ==
Rajapur town is connected with some major cities like District headquarter Chitrakoot, Allahabad, Kanpur, Lucknow etc. by National highway and state highway.

Roads: Rajapur is connected with Manjhanpur (Kaushambi District), Bharwari, Prayagraj in one direction where currently Ram van gaman path is under development (as of Aug 25), similarly it is connected by NH 731AG to Raipura which further connect Rajapur with Manikpur (major railway station in the area for Howrah Bombay line). Similarly it is connected with district headquarter Chitrakoot and Karwi through two lane highway, and connected with Baberu and Banda with existing two lane road. Few roads like Raipura to Manikpur is highly needed to be developed (as on Aug 25) to connect Rajapur with Manikpur railway station and to ensure safe journey on the road. Bundelkhand expressway which starts from Bharatkup near Chitrakoot is approximately 40 kms away from Rajapur.

Railway: The nearest railway station is Chitrakoot Dham Karwi (CKTD) which connects Banda, Jhansi, Kanpur and Delhi line on one side and Allahabad, Varanasi on another side. Another railway junction is Manikpur (MKP) which connects Katni, Jabalpur, Bombay line on one side and Allahabad, Varanasi, Patna on other side. Although road connectivity for Manikpur railway junction is required to be improved from existing single lane road to two lane highway (Raipura to Saraiya stretch of 13 kms only) because of its utility.

Air: The nearest airport is at Bamrauli near Prayagraj which is approximately 80 km away from Rajapur. Lucknow airport ( Chaudhary Charan Singh International Airport) which has frequent flights for major cities of the country, is nearly 180 km away from the town. A new Chitrakoot airport near Devangana ghati is under development stage which may become fully operational in coming two three years (As on Aug 2025).It will connect Chitrakoot with major cities which can boost economy through tourism.

== Culture ==
All the festivals are celebrated with full enthusiasm and people cherish these occasions like Holi, Diwali, Dussehra, Navratri, Raksha Bandhan etc. In Rajapur there is Agahan mela is organised for one month when people visit hanuman ji swamy temple with devotion. People also take holy dip in the Yamuna river in various occasions like makar sankranti, Mauni Amavasya, Kartik snan etc.

== Economy ==
People of the town are mostly dependent on self business. Industrial development is almost nil, however small scale production of agro/food products may be there for sell at local market. Some of the families own farm land so practice agriculture and vegetable production. There is a good level of attention towards education and thereby jobs in government as well as private sector. Well educated youth are serving the country in the various positions including software industry, education, service sector, and public administration.
