= Third Tiwari ministry (Uttar Pradesh) =

Indian state government (1988–89)

- Ministry of Uttar Pradesh
- Date formed: 25 June 1988
- Date dissolved: 5 December 1989

People and organisations
- Chief Minister: Narayan Dutt Tiwari
- Member party: Indian National Congress

History
- Legislature term: 9th Uttar Pradesh Legislative Assembly
- Predecessor: Vir Bahadur Singh
- Successor: Mulayam Singh Yadav

The Third Narayan Dutt Tiwari ministry is the Council of Ministers in the 9th Uttar Pradesh Legislative Assembly headed by Chief Minister Narayan Dutt Tiwari from 25 June 1988 to 5 December 1989, after Tiwari was defeated in the 1989 Uttar Pradesh Legislative Assembly election.

== Council of ministers ==
Name	Office	Portfolio	Took office	Left office	Party
Narayan Dutt Tiwari	Chief Minister		25 June 1988	5 December 1989	Indian National Congress
Vir Bahadur Singh	Cabinet Minister	Irrigation	25 June 1988	5 December 1989	Indian National Congress
Lokpati Tripathi	Cabinet Minister	Public Health and Medical	25 June 1988	5 December 1989	Indian National Congress
Vasudev Singh	Cabinet Minister	Food and Logistics	25 June 1988	5 December 1989	Indian National Congress
Baldev Singh Arya	Cabinet Minister	Revenue	25 June 1988	5 December 1989	Indian National Congress
Saeedul Hasan	Cabinet Minister	Labour	25 June 1988	5 December 1989	Indian National Congress
Narendra Singh	Cabinet Minister	Agriculture	25 June 1988	5 December 1989	Indian National Congress
Ajeet Pratap Singh	Cabinet Minister	Excise and Prohibition	25 June 1988	5 December 1989	Indian National Congress
Swaroop kumari Bakshi	Cabinet Minister	Social Welfare	25 June 1988	5 December 1989	Indian National Congress
Sunil Shastri	Cabinet Minister	Energy	25 June 1988	5 December 1989	Indian National Congress
Sanjay Singh	Cabinet Minister	Transport	25 June 1988	5 December 1989	Indian National Congress
Ram Ratan Singh	Cabinet Minister	Parliamentary Affairs	25 June 1988	5 December 1989	Indian National Congress
Gopinath Dikshit	Cabinet Minister	Industries	25 June 1988	5 December 1989	Indian National Congress
Shyam Surat Upadhyay	Cabinet Minister	Rural Development and Panchayati Raj	25 June 1988	5 December 1989	Indian National Congress
Beni Bai	Cabinet Minister	Animal Husbandary	25 June 1988	5 December 1989	Indian National Congress
Arun Kumar Singh	Cabinet Minister	Cooperatives	25 June 1988	5 December 1989	Indian National Congress
Raghuvir Singh Yadav	Cabinet Minister	Prison and political Pension	25 June 1988	5 December 1989	Indian National Congress
Sibte Razi	Cabinet Minister	Education and Muslim Waqf	25 June 1988	5 December 1989	Indian National Congress
Jairam Verma	Cabinet Minister	Planning	25 June 1988	5 December 1989	Indian National Congress
Gulab Singh	Minister of State	Hill Development	25 June 1988	5 December 1989	Indian National Congress
Praveen kumar Sharma	Minister of State	Public Construction	25 June 1988	5 December 1989	Indian National Congress
Shiv Balak Pasi	Minister of State	Agriculture	25 June 1988	5 December 1989	Indian National Congress
Zafar Ali Naqvi	Minister of State	Forest	25 June 1988	5 December 1989	Indian National Congress
Surendra Singh	Minister of State	Rural Development and Panchayati Raj	25 June 1988	5 December 1989	Indian National Congress
Om Prakash Richhariya	Minister of State	Finance and Planning	25 June 1988	5 December 1989	Indian National Congress
Daljit Singh	Minister of State	Animal Husbandry, Dairying and Fisheries	25 June 1988	5 December 1989	Indian National Congress
Indrajeet	Minister of State	Social Welfare	25 June 1988	5 December 1989	Indian National Congress
Gauri Shankar	Minister of State	Revenue	25 June 1988	5 December 1989	Indian National Congress
Deepak Kumar	Minister of State	Cooperative	25 June 1988	5 December 1989	Indian National Congress
Padma Seth	Minister of State	Urban Development	25 June 1988	5 December 1989	Indian National Congress
Bhola Shankar Maurya	Minister of State	Irrigation	25 June 1988	5 December 1989	Indian National Congress
Manpal Singh	Minister of State	Food and Logistics	25 June 1988	5 December 1989	Indian National Congress
Mohammad Safiur Rehman Ansari	Minister of State	Industries	25 June 1988	5 December 1989	Indian National Congress
Sankatha Prasad Shastri	Minister of State	Education	25 June 1988	5 December 1989	Indian National Congress
Sukhda Mishra	Minister of State	Energy	25 June 1988	5 December 1989	Indian National Congress
Surendra Singh Chauhan	Minister of State	Justice	25 June 1988	5 December 1989	Indian National Congress
Hukum Singh	Minister of State	Parliamentary Affairs and information	25 June 1988	5 December 1989	Indian National Congress
