= Patti, Uttar Pradesh =

Patti
- Town
- Location in Uttar Pradesh, India Patti (India)
- Coordinates: 25.92°N 82.2°E
- Country: India
- State: Uttar Pradesh
- District: Pratapgarh
- Elevation: 84 m (276 ft)

Population (2011)
  - Total: 10,788

Language
  - Official: Hindi
  - Additional official: Urdu
- Time zone: UTC+5:30 (IST)
- Vehicle registration: UP - 72
- Website: up.gov.in

Patti is a town and a Nagar Panchayat in Pratapgarh district in the Indian state of Uttar Pradesh. It's located 25 km of distance from District headquarter.

== Geography ==
Patti is located at 25.92°N 82.2°E. It has an average elevation of 84 metres (275 feet).

== Demographics ==
Patti is a Nagar Panchayat city in district of Pratapgarh, Uttar Pradesh. The Patti city is divided into 10 wards for which elections are held every 5 years. The Patti Nagar Panchayat has population of 10,788 of which 5,607 are males while 5,181 are females as per report released by Census India 2011.

The population of children aged 0-6 is 1462 which is 13.55% of total population of Patti (NP). In Patti Nagar Panchayat, the female sex ratio is 924 against state average of 912. Moreover the child sex ratio in Patti is around 889 compared to Uttar Pradesh state average of 902. The literacy rate of Patti city is 81.41% higher than the state average of 67.68%. In Patti, male literacy is around 87.27% while the female literacy rate is 75.09%.

Patti Nagar Panchayat has total administration over 1,576 houses to which it supplies basic amenities like water and sewerage. It is also authorized to build roads within Nagar Panchayat limits and impose taxes on properties coming under its jurisdiction.
