= Mangraura =

- Town
- State: Uttar Pradesh
- District: Pratapgarh

Languages
  - Official: HindiAwadhi
- Time zone: UTC+5:30 (IST)
- Postal code: 230405

Magraura is a town in Magraura Block, Pratapgarh district, Uttar Pradesh state, India. It is 26 kilometres (16 mi) from the district's main city of Pratapgarh and 152 kilometres (94 mi) from the state capital at Lucknow.
