= Chitrakoot district =

Coordinates: 25°12′49″N 80°54′55″E

- District of Uttar Pradesh
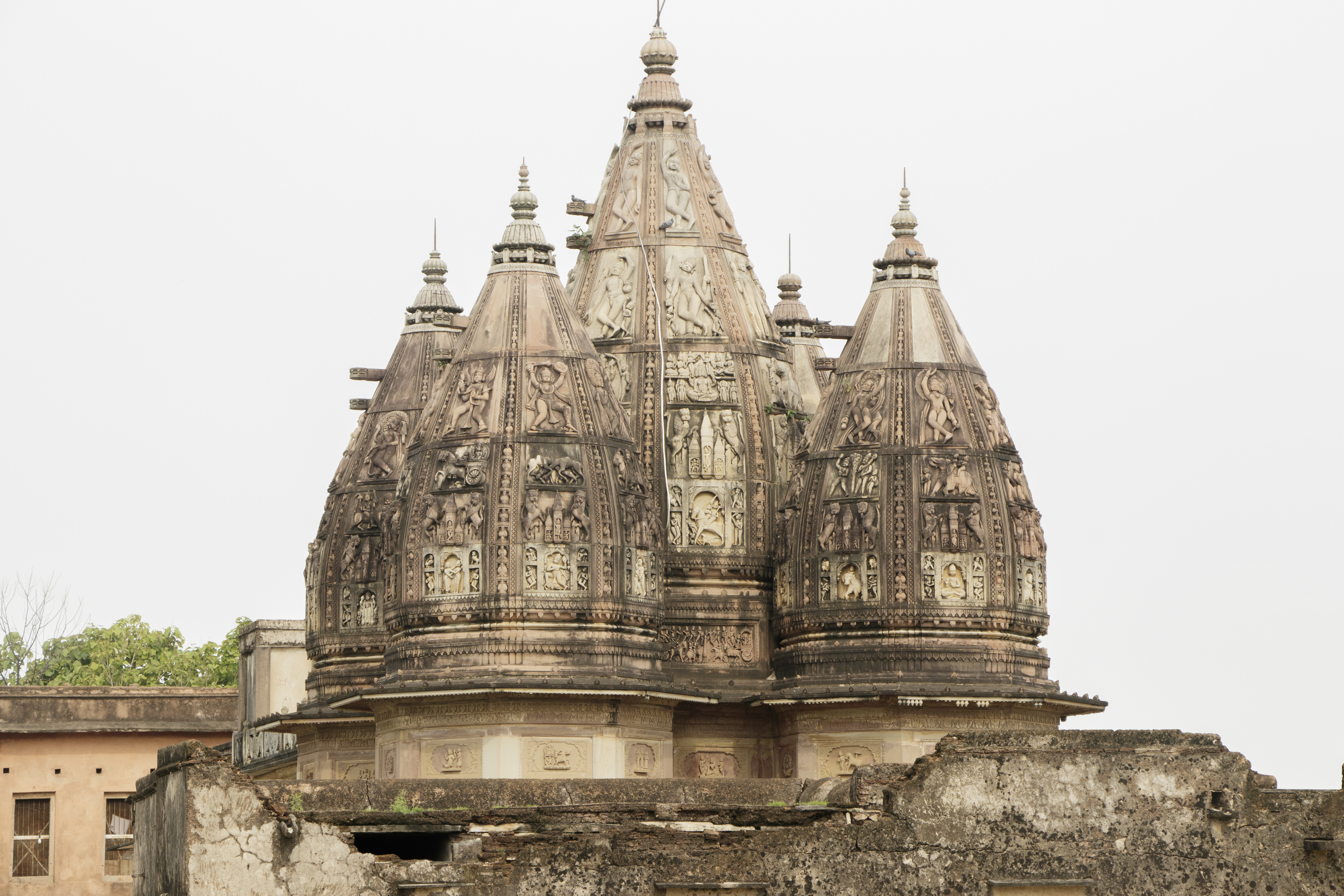
- Ganesh Bagh, Chitrakoot

- Location of Chitrakoot district in Uttar Pradesh
- Country: India
- State: Uttar Pradesh
- Division: Chitrakoot
- Headquarters: Chitrakoot
- Tehsils: 4 Karwi, Mau, Manikpur and Rajapur

Government
  - Vidhan Sabha constituencies: Chitrakoot and Manikpur

Area
  - Total: 3,415 km^{2} (1,319 sq mi)

Population (2011)
  - Total: 991,730
  - Density: 290.4/km^{2} (752.1/sq mi)
  - Urban: 96,352

Demographics
  - Literacy: 85.05
  - Sex ratio: 879
- Time zone: UTC+05:30 (IST)
- Major highways: NH 76
- Website: chitrakoot.nic.in

Chitrakoot district is one of the districts of Uttar Pradesh state of India in the Baghelkhand and Bundelkhand regions. Chitrakoot Dham is the district headquarters. Chitrakoot district is a part of Chitrakoot Division. The district occupies an area of 3,216 km^{2}.The district has a population of 991,730 (2011 Census). As of 2011 it is the second least populated district of Uttar Pradesh (out of 75), after Mahoba.

To the north, Chitrakoot district shares its boundary with Kaushambi district. The eastern border adjoins Prayagraj district (formerly Allahabad district). In the south, it is flanked by Satna district and Rewa district of Madhya Pradesh, forming inter-state boundaries. To the west, the district touches Banda district.

== Economy ==
In 2006 the Ministry of Panchayati Raj named Chitrakoot one of the country's 250 most backward districts (out of a total of 640). It is one of the 34 districts in Uttar Pradesh currently receiving funds from the Backward Regions Grant Fund Programme (BRGF). Successive governments have often ignored the district's development and hence has become one of the most remote and cut-off districts in India.

== Major Towns ==
- Chitrakoot Dham
- Manikpur
- Rajapur
- Mau

== Administration ==
=== Tehsils ===
The Chitrakoot district is divided into 4 Sub-Divisions (Tehsils), each headed by a SDM.

1. Karwi
2. Mau
3. Manikpur
4. Rajapur

=== Blocks ===
The Chitrakoot district is divided into 5 Community Development Blocks, each headed by a BDO.

1. Karwi
2. Mau
3. Pahari
4. Ramnagar
5. Manikpur

== Transportation ==
Closest Airport to Chitrakoot city is in Chitrakoot Airport and Prayagraj Airport which is 106 kilometers (65.8 miles) away and has flights to major destinations such as New Delhi, Bengaluru, Mumbai, Kolkata etc.

Chitrakootdham Karwi Railway Station and Manikpur Junction Railway Station, located at Manikpur Sarhat is a major railway station in Chitrakoot district, providing train connections to Mumbai, Kolkata, Patna, New Delhi, etc.

== Demographics ==
Historical population
Year	Pop.	±% p.a.
1901	212,242	—
1911	221,166	+0.41%
1921	206,634	−0.68%
1931	219,667	+0.61%
1941	253,728	+1.45%
1951	270,877	+0.66%
1961	322,065	+1.75%
1971	389,516	+1.92%
1981	510,346	+2.74%
1991	624,177	+2.03%
2001	801,957	+2.54%
2011	991,730	+2.15%

Religions in Chitrakoot district (2011)
Religion	Percent
Hinduism	96.33%
Islam	3.48%
Other or not stated	0.19%
Distribution of religions

According to the 2011 census Chitrakoot district has a population of 991,730, roughly equal to the nation of Fiji or the US state of Montana. This gives it a ranking of 448th in India (out of a total of 640). The district has a population density of 315 inhabitants per square kilometre (820/sq mi) . Its population growth rate over the decade 2001-2011 was 29.29%. 175,311 (17.68%) are under 7 years of age. Chitrakoot has a sex ratio of 879 females for every 1000 males, and a literacy rate of 66.52%. 9.71% of the population lives in urban areas. Scheduled Castes make up 26.89% of the population.

Languages of Chitrakoot district (2011)
1. Hindi (68.6%)
2. Bundeli (30.5%)
3. Others (0.87%)

At the time of the 2011 Census of India, 68.61% of the population in the district spoke Hindi and 30.52% Bundeli as their first language. Chitrakoot is located at the junction of Bundeli, Awadhi and Bagheli dialects.

== Notes ==
- Braj Basi Lal (2011). Excavations at Bharadwaja Ashram: with a note on the exploration at Chitrakuta. Archaeological Survey of India.
