= Banda Lok Sabha constituency =

Lok Sabha Constituency in Uttar Pradesh

Coordinates: 25.48°N 80.34°E

Banda UP-48
- Lok Sabha constituency
- Interactive Map Outlining Banda Lok Sabha constituency

Constituency details
- Country: India
- Region: North India
- State: Uttar Pradesh
- Assembly constituencies: Baberu; Naraini; Banda; Chitrakoot; Manikpur
- Established: 1957
- Reservation: None

Member of Parliament
- 18th Lok Sabha
- Incumbent Krishna Devi Shivshanker
- Party: Samajwadi Party
- Elected year: 2024
- Preceded by: R. K. Singh Patel

Banda Lok Sabha Constituency 48 is one of the 80 parliamentary constituency in Uttar Pradesh state in northern India. Bundelkhand region

== Assembly segments ==
Banda Lok Sabha constituency comprises five Vidhan Sabha (legislative assembly) segments. These are:

No	Name	District	Member	Party	2024 Lead
233	Baberu	Banda	Vishambhar Singh Yadav	SP	SP
234	Naraini (SC)	Banda	Ommani Verma	BJP	SP
235	Banda	Banda	Prakash Dwivedi	BJP	BJP
236	Chitrakoot	Chitrakoot	Anil Pradhan Patel	SP	SP
237	Manikpur	Chitrakoot	Avinash Chandra Dwivedi	AD(S)	SP

== Members of Parliament ==
Year	Member	Party
1957	Dinesh Singh	Indian National Congress
1962	Savitri Nigam	Indian National Congress
1967	Jageshwar Yadav	Communist Party of India
1971	Ram Ratan Sharma	Bharatiya Jana Sangh
1977	Ambika Prasad Pandey	Janata Party
1980	Ramnath Dubey	Indian National Congress
1984	Bhishma Deo Dubey	Indian National Congress
1989	Ram Sajeevan	Communist Party of India
1991	Prakash Narain Tripathi	Bharatiya Janata Party
1996	Ram Sajeevan	Bahujan Samaj Party
1998	Ramesh Chandra Dwivedi	Bharatiya Janata Party
1999	Ram Sajeevan	Bahujan Samaj Party
2004	Shyama Charan Gupta	Samajwadi Party
2009	R. K. Singh Patel	Samajwadi Party
2014	Bhairon Prasad Mishra	Bharatiya Janata Party
2019	R. K. Singh Patel	Bharatiya Janata Party
2024	Krishna Devi Shivshanker	Samajwadi Party

== Election results ==
=== 2024 ===
2024 Indian general election: Banda
Party	Candidate	Votes	%	±%
SP	Krishna Devi Shivshanker Patel	406,567	38.94	▼1.56
BJP	R. K. Singh Patel	3,35,357	32.12	▼14.08
BSP	Mayank Dwivedi	2,45,745	23.54	▲23.54
NOTA	None of the Above	13,235	1.27	N/A
Majority		71,210	6.82	▲1.13
Turnout		10,44,132	59.75	▼1.05
SP gain from BJP		Swing		

=== 2019 ===
2019 Indian general elections: Banda
Party	Candidate	Votes	%	±%
BJP	R. K. Singh Patel	477,926	46.20	
SP	Shyama Charan Gupta	4,18,988	40.50	
INC	Bal Kumar Patel	75,438	7.29	
PSP(L)	Chhote Lal Yadav	12,747	1.23	
CPI	Mhendra prathap Varma	10,349	1.00	
Majority		58,938	5.69	
Turnout		10,34,912	60.80	
BJP hold		Swing		

=== General election 2014 ===
2014 Indian general elections: Banda
Party	Candidate	Votes	%	±%
BJP	Bhairon Prasad Mishra	3,42,066	39.84	
BSP	R. K. Singh Patel	2,26,278	26.3	
SP	Bal Kumar Patel	1,89,730	22.10	
INC	Vivek Kumar Singh	36,650	4.27	
CPI(M)	Ramchandra Saras	15,156	1.77	
AAP	Amar Singh Rathaur	6,439	0.75	
JD(U)	Pappu Yadav	2,436	0.28	
Majority		1,15,788	13.49	
Turnout		8,58,689	53.61	
BJP gain from SP		Swing		

== See also ==
- Banda
- List of constituencies of the Lok Sabha
