= Gulabi Gang =

Women's vigilante group in India

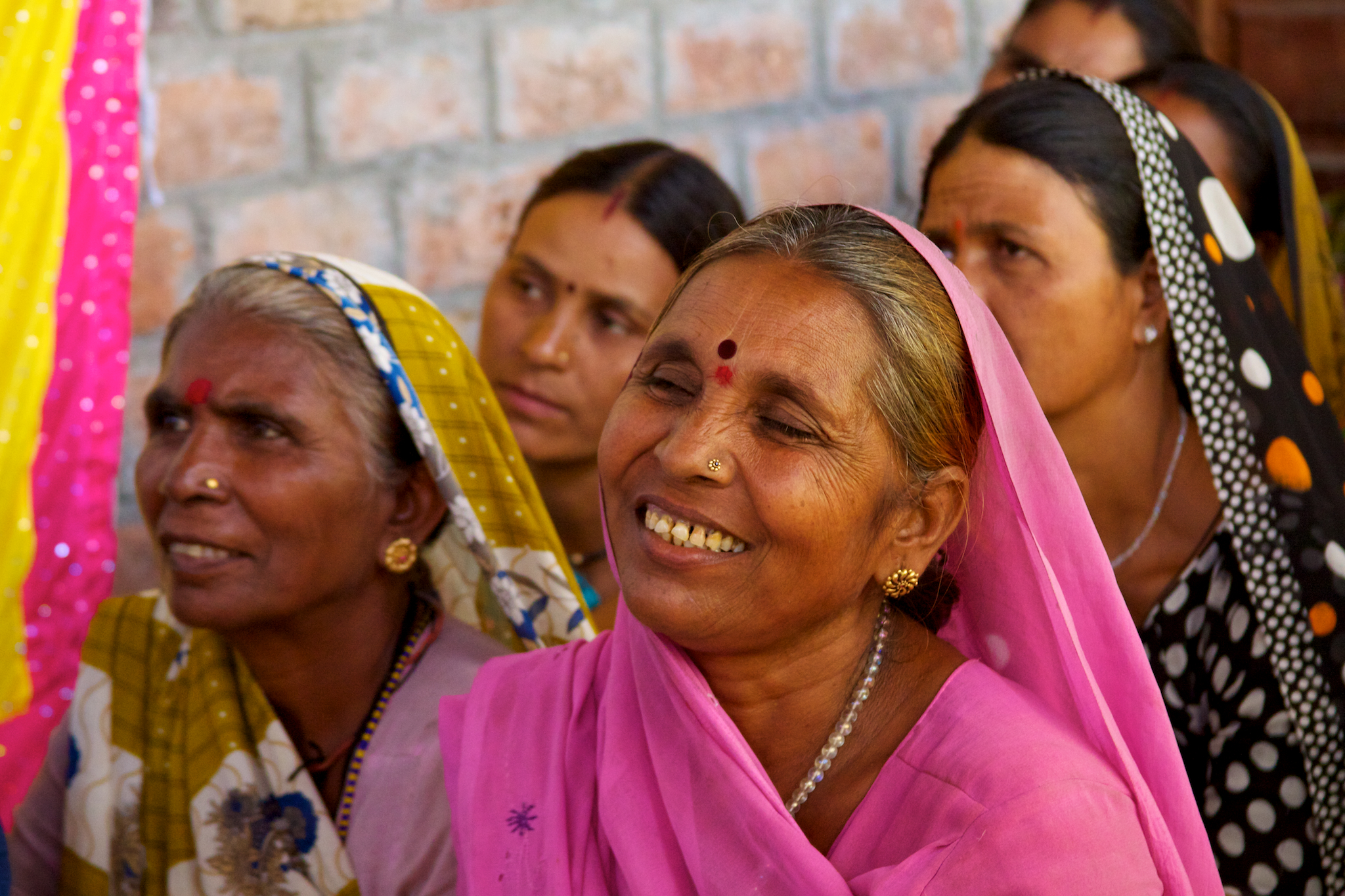
Rural women in Madhya Pradesh

The Gulabi Gang (from Hindi gulabi, "pink") is a female vigilante group in India. Sampat Pal Devi started the group in 2006 in Banda District, Uttar Pradesh. The group is dedicated to empowering women of all castes and protecting them from domestic violence, sexual violence, and oppression. They also combat political corruption and the oppression of lower caste people, specifically Dalits.

In 2014, the group estimated over 270,000 members consisting of women between 18 and 60 years old. The group uses both non-violent and violent tactics and reports many successful interventions. They aim to support women in attaining financial autonomy, education, and political empowerment. Despite facing difficulties with local government bodies, many members of the Gulabi Gang have been elected into office. The group has also garnered substantial recognition and media attention.

== Background ==
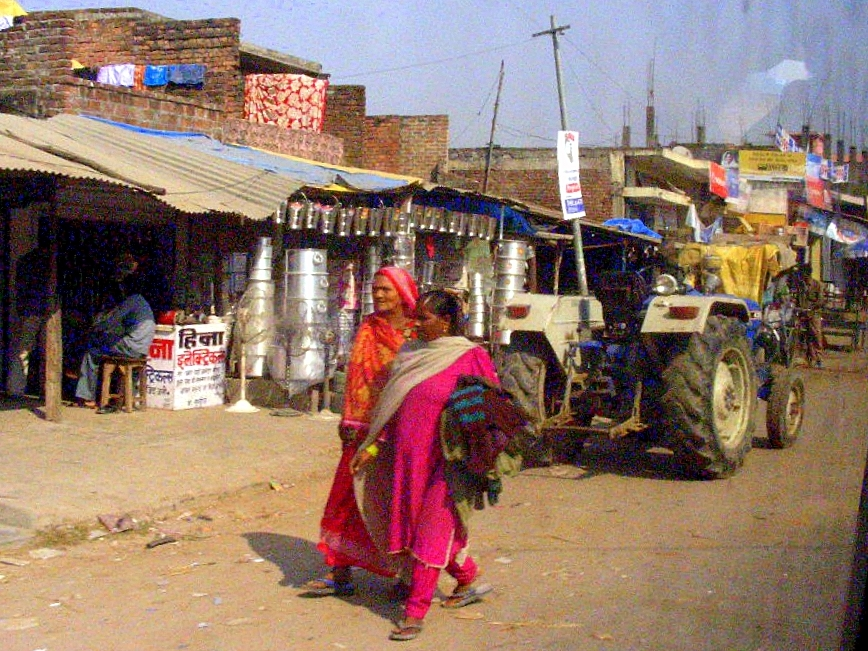
Gulabi Gang members in Kolhui, Uttar Pradesh

=== Regional context ===
The Gulabi Gang is officially headquartered in Badausa in Banda district, Uttar Pradesh. As of 2003, the district was ranked 154th on the Planning Commission's list of 447 districts based on an index of backwardness. Uttar Pradesh has one of the highest rates of domestic and sexual violence against women. It reports high rates of child marriage, dowry demands, mortality during childbirth, and a low female literacy rate. Additionally, over 20% of the Banda district population is lower caste people, with a high Dalit population, who face severe oppression and discrimination. Many of the members of the Gulabi Gang and the women they protect are lower caste women, meaning they are especially vulnerable in this rural setting. The region is also ridden with government corruption specifically in the unfair distribution of resources and a widespread lack of education.

=== Membership ===
The gang has reported to have grown since 2010 and has been active in regions of Uttar Pradesh and Madhya Pradesh. In 2014, the group estimated around 270,000 members. To become a member of the Gulabi Gang, women are expected to pay a registration fee of 100 rupees. Members wear bright pink saris and carry lathis, or wooden sticks, for protection. When a woman is assisted by the gang, she is expected to join the gang and contribute to the mission of assisting other women.

While men are not permitted to be members of the gang, many male villagers play an active supporting role. One such examples is Jai Prakash Shivhari, who joined to stand in solidarity against issues like government corruption, child marriages, and dowry deaths. Often, a few male supporters will accompany the gang to gatherings and protests for safety purposes. Because many villages predominantly only educate men, male supporters also assist with administrative tasks that require reading, writing, and math skills. The gang's initiatives have also been advantageous for many male villagers, who have increasingly requested the group's assistance in their advocacy campaigns. For instance, when Banda farmers staged a demonstration to demand compensation for failed crops, they sought the Gulabi Gang's support. This collaboration has encouraged more men to openly endorse the gang's endeavors and be more receptive to the idea of their own female relatives joining the group.

=== Leadership ===
The Gang has several regional stations and each station has a head of a section called the 'commander', who handles daily activities and smaller problems of people in that area. The commander sends regular updates and reports any substantial problems to the leader of the Gang.

On March 2, 2014, Pal was relieved of her role as the head of the Gulabi Gang amid allegations of financial impropriety and putting her personal interests before those of the group. Pal denied these allegations and still has some involvement in the gang. The members elected Suman Singh Chauhan, formerly the assistant commander of the group to run the group.

== Tactics ==
=== Non-violent demonstration ===
The Gulabi Gang has participated in countless protests and demonstrations, often relying on media coverage and mass mobilization to make a substantial impact. When police officers at the Atarra police station refused to lodge a Dalit’s complaint, the group organized a demonstration of over 200 members. They stormed the police station with pink dogs, who they claimed were more loyal and effective than the police, as a "replacement" for the police. The group had invited the media to publicly shame the police officers into doing their jobs. In 2011, the gang helped Sheelu Nishad, a 17-year-old girl who had been gang raped. Nishad was arrested after arriving at the police station to file a report. The rapists, which also included a member of the legislature, arrived at the police station first and requested her arrest. The victim's father approached the Gulabi Gang, which organised two mass demonstrations in front of the police station and legislator's house.

The group also participates in occupations, often using a traditional tactic, gherao, which involves surrounding government buildings as a show of force. In 2008, they surrounded an electricity office in Banda district where officials had cut the village's power in order to extract bribes and sexual favors. The gang members locked the staff inside the office building and vowed to only remove the lock if electricity was restored. The officials complied in less than an hour. In June 2007, Pal heard that government-run fair-price shops were not distributing food and grains to the villagers as they should. She led the Gulabi Gang to observe the shop undercover and they collected evidence and discovered that trucks were shipping the shop's grains to open markets. Pal and the group reported the evidence to local authorities and demanded that the grain be returned to the fair-price shops. The local authorities ignored their complaints but the reputation of the Gang was bolstered.

=== Violent intervention ===
All members of the Gulabi Gang carry and are trained to use a lathi. Lathis are common weapons in rural areas as they can be created from trees. While the media tends to focus on their violent interventions, the Gulabi Gang tends to use violence as a last resort or in self defense.

When intervening in a domestic violence case, the gang begins by approaching the police. They only pursue the case if the police does not respond or acts unjustly. In their intervention, the gang first reasons with the abuser and demands he stop the abuse. If he doesn't comply, the wife joins the gang in thrashing the husband. According to Sampat, the Gulabi Gang has had a 100% success rate in bringing justice to domestic violence complaints and has thrashed hundreds of abusive husbands.

Pal Devi has said that "Yes, we fight rapists with lathis [large bamboo sticks]. If we find the culprit, we thrash him black and blue so he dare not attempt to do wrong to any girl or a woman again." Suman Singh, a later commander of the gang, mentioned that when "a woman seeks the membership of Gulabi Gang, it is because she has suffered injustice, has been oppressed and does not see any other recourse. All our women can stand up to the men and if need be seek retribution through lathis."

They also use violence, or the threat of violence, against local officials. When the Gulabi Gang requested district officials to repair a damaged road, a senior official rebuked the women and insulted Sampat Pal Devi. In response, they overpowered him and made him walk on a three-kilometer long damaged road. The official asked for forgiveness and went on to create the new road.

=== Group solidarity ===
All members of the group are expected to wear a uniform of a pink sari and carry a wooden stick. Sampat Pal Devi claims the pink sari uniform commands respect and protection for the gang's members. While the sari is not obligatory, Pal Devi argues that it gives the women a "sense of community" and ensures they are "taken seriously".

=== Financial independence ===
A major goal of the Gulabi Gang is to promote financial security and independence among women. The Gulabi Gang has established many small businesses that sell handmade products at nearby markets for profit. They work in small-scale industries such as organic manure, candles, Ayurvedic medicines, and pickles. These small businesses often employ other women; Prema Rambahori's leaf plate making business employs 500 other women. The gang has also promoted business in the wedding market by training women to manage wedding venues and provide services such as catering, tailoring, creating flower arrangements, and applying henna.

=== Education ===
One goal of the Gulabi Gang was to reduce illiteracy among young women and expand education access to lower caste people. In 2008, a Pal Devi created a school in Banda, where at least 400 girls attended. Furthermore, the gang often visits households to advise parents on educating girls and encourage students to attend classes. One member of the Gulabi Gang, Chandania Devi, claimed that the group was also able to find a teacher for an unstaffed school in a predominantly Dalit village.

=== Political support ===
The group also seeks to politically empower women. They assist illiterate women or lower-caste people in submitting forms and applications for government aid and resources. The Gulabi Gang also disseminates information about the Panchayati Raj Act and the opportunities it offers for those interested in running for office.

== Government relationship ==
Due to the Gulabi Gang's efforts to counter corruption, they are often in direct opposition to local government institutions and the police. This strained relationship has led the Gulabi Gang to become a target of local police officers and political leaders. Many members have received threats of violence and been called "militant Maoists" by local police officers. Police officials have also frequently accused the Gulabi Gang of defamation and assault.

However, more recently the Gulabi Gang has made its way into politics to better serve the interests of their members. In 2007, Sampat Pal Devi ran for office for the constituency of Naraini as an independent candidate, but lost. Shortly after, some influential members of the Congress Party grew interested in running Pal Devi in a general election on behalf of the Congress Party. Although this would have supported her success, Pal Devi refused the offer. She stated that she did not align with any particular party and did not approve of the substantial gap between their campaign promises and actual accomplishments. Moreover, she did not want to betray her people by having to pledge loyalty to the party and its members' requests. Pal notes that the Gulabi Gang are able to, and prefer to manage themselves, so they will not be taken for granted by the state.

Despite their rejection of party affiliations, Gulabi Gang members have gained significant political power. In 2010, 21 members were elected for panchayat positions, which oversee local issues such as road construction, water sanitation, and agricultural development schemes. Many of the gang members are able to use the Panchayati Raj Act of 1993, which reserves one-third of seats for women and marginalized groups.

== Recognition ==
=== Corporate partnerships ===
Corporate partnerships of the Gulabi Gang include Vitalect, a technology and services company that works with non-profit organisations to assist them with their technological needs, and Social Solution India (SSI), a non-profit company that promotes NGO stability.

=== Awards ===
The Gulabi Gang earned the Kelvinator 11th GR8! Women Award, an award offered by the Indian Television Academy. They also earned the Godfrey Phillips Bravery Award for social bravery, offered in Uttar Pradesh, Uttarakhand, and Delhi.

=== Media ===
- The Gulabi gang is the subject of the 2010 movie Pink Saris by Kim Longinotto as well as the 2012 documentary Gulabi Gang by Nishtha Jain.
- Initially, it was reported that the Bollywood film, Gulaab Gang, starring Madhuri Dixit and Juhi Chawla as leads, was based on Sampat Pal's life, but the director denied this, saying that he admired her work but that the movie was not based on her life.
- In 2013, a book was published about the Gang's origins and work, called "Pink Sari Revolution: A Tale of Women and Power in India."
- The Gulabi Gang is featured in the 2017 song Des fleurs et des flammes by French singer Tal from her album Tal.
- The Gulabi Gang is featured in N.H. Senzai's novel, Ticket to India.

== See also ==
- Bhumata Brigade
- Lathi khela — martial art using lathi sticks
- Red Brigade Lucknow
- Sari Squad
