= Bigg Boss (Hindi TV series) season 6 =

Season of television series (2012)

Bigg Boss
- Season 6
- Title of season 6
- Presented by: Salman Khan
- No. of days: 97
- No. of housemates: 19
- Winner: Urvashi Dholakia
- Runner-up: Imam Siddique
- No. of episodes: 98

Release
- Original network: Colors TV
- Original release: 7 October 2012 – 12 January 2013

Season chronology
- ← Previous; Season 5 Next → Season 7

Bigg Boss 6, also known as Bigg Boss 6: Alag Che!, is the sixth season of the Indian Hindi-language reality TV show Bigg Boss, which is telecast on Colors TV. The season started on 7 October 2012 and ended on 12 January 2013. Salman Khan, who was the host of the previous two seasons, again hosted the season. The sixth season was launched as a Parivarik season with a Gujarati tagline- Alag che! (English: It's different).

The series was won by soap actress Urvashi Dholakia on 12 January 2013. Imam Siddiqui was the first runner up while Sana Khan and Niketan Madhok were second and third runners-up respectively.

The final episode on 12 January had a 4.4 TVR (television rating points), becoming the highest-rated non-fiction show during the week. The finale also fared better than its previous season, which had dropped to 3.6 TVR. In the fourth season, the finale had rated a 6.7 TVR. The show averaged 3.3 TVR in the week ended 12 January compared to 2.8 in the trailing week.

== Production ==
=== House themes ===
Luxury house

The purpose built house is located at Lonavala, Maharashtra. It is designed by renowned art director Sabu Cyril. The house is built over an area of 15000 square feet. Featuring a more subtle and home-like feel with shades of red and white, it follows a completely different look from the previous year's house.

Rooms/Areas in the house include

- Confession room
- Captain's Quarters (the reward room)
- Living room
- Kitchen/Dining room
- The utility room
- Two separate bedrooms, along with storage shelves to store the housemates possessions
  - One with Sunflower beds, wherein the petals act as beds, other with normal beds
- Bathroom
- Garden area which has a small pool with four white chairs placed next it

=== Twists ===
==== Not selected ====
In the grand premiere there was a twist where these more housemates came as commoners and the public had to vote which one of them will be selected to go inside. Kashif was selected while Divya and Rohin was rejected.

==== Secret village ====
The Padosi Ghar (Neighbour house) or the Secret village was revealed on Day 41, following the eviction of Aashka. Bigg Boss revealed that this year some evicted housemates and new entries will move to the village house where they will live for an undisclosed amount of time. Eventually, some of the housemates living in the village may return to the main house. The house is built on grounds adjacent to the luxury house on a space only one-fourth of the size of the former. This rustic squatters' area has been designed by Leena Chanda. It is not equipped with amenities like air conditioning, microwave ovens, sink and swimming pool. 4 days after re-entering the village house Imam was relocated to the main house. 6 days after Imam was moved, the village was intruded by masked men who destroyed the house completely and abducted all five housemates in an attempt of move them to the main house via a tunnel.

Rooms/areas in the village include

- A small confession room
- Single bedroom consisting of 6 beds
- A well
- Couches have been replaced with chatayis for comfort on the floor
- A vintage television set which shows live feed from the main luxury house

== Housemates status ==
Sr	Housemate	Day entered	Day exited	Status
1	Urvashi	Day 1	Day 98	Winner
2	Imam	Day 35	Day 43	Ejected
2	Imam	Day 45	Day 98	1st runner-up
3	Sana	Day 1	Day 98	2nd runner-up
4	Niketan	Day 1	Day 98	3rd runner-up
5	Rajeev	Day 1	Day 98	4th runner-up
6	Delnaaz	Day 1	Day 95	Evicted
7	Sapna	Day 1	Day 91	Evicted
8	Aashka	Day 1	Day 84	Evicted
9	Karishma	Day 1	Day 23	Walked
9	Karishma	Day 42	Day 84	Evicted
10	Vishal	Day 35	Day 77	Evicted
11	Santosh	Day 43	Day 70	Evicted
12	Dinesh	Day 1	Day 14	Evicted
12	Dinesh	Day 35	Day 70	Evicted
13	Mink	Day 35	Day 63	Evicted
14	Vrajesh	Day 1	Day 56	Evicted
15	Sampat	Day 1	Day 35	Evicted
16	Sidhu	Day 1	Day 33	Walked
17	Aseem	Day 1	Day 28	Evicted
18	Sayantani	Day 1	Day 21	Evicted
19	Kashif	Day 1	Day 14	Evicted
20	Divya	Day 0	Day 0	Evicted
21	Rohin	Day 0	Day 0	Evicted

== Housemates ==
The participants in the order of appearance and entrance in the house are:

=== Original entrants ===
- Navjot Singh Sidhu – Former Indian cricketer and Indian Member of Parliament from Amritsar (Lok Sabha constituency). He appeared as a judge on The Great Indian Laughter Challenge for all for its seasons and also acted in the serial Kyaa Hoga Nimmo Kaa which starred Sanjeeda Sheikh.
- Sana Khan – Actress, model and dancer. Sana has appeared in many films like Dhan Dhana Dhan Goal (in item song Bilo Rani) and Halla Bol.
- Vrajesh Hirjee – Actor. He is known for appearing in films such as Kaho Naa... Pyaar Hai, Tum Bin, Rehnaa Hai Terre Dil Mein, Kucch To Hai, Krishna Cottage, Fanaa, Golmaal, Salaam-E-Ishq, Heyy Babyy, Sunday and Golmaal Returns. He also appeared in the show Jassi Jaissi Koi Nahin.
- Sampat Pal Devi – Social activist. She is the founder and leader of a group of women activists in India's northern Uttar Pradesh state's Banda District, called the "Gulabi Gang".
- Urvashi Dholakia – Television actress. She is known for playing the role of Komolika in the show Kasautii Zindagii Kay.
- Aashka Goradia – Television actress. She is known for her role of Kumud in the show Kkusum and later appeared in shows like Kyunki Saas Bhi Kabhi Bahu Thi, Kahiin to Hoga, Sinndoor Tere Naam Ka and Laagi Tujhse Lagan. She participated in Fear Factor: Khatron Ke Khiladi in 2011.
- Dinesh Lal Yadav – Bhojpuri actor.
- Delnaaz Irani – Actress who separated from her marriage to fellow contestant Rajev Paul in 2010. She is known for playing the role of Sweety in Kal Ho Naa Ho. She also appeared in shows like Karam Apnaa Apnaa, Baa Bahoo Aur Baby and Kya Huaa Tera Vaada. She participated in the reality show Nach Baliye.
- Aseem Trivedi—Cartoonist.
- Sapna Bhavnani – Celebrity hairstylist.
- Rajeev Paul – Indian television and theatre actor and writer who split from his marriage to fellow contestant Delnaaz Irani in 2010. He is known for his role of Deven Garg in the Ekta Kapoor show Kahaani Ghar Ghar Kii. He later participated in Nach Baliye.
- Sayantani Ghosh – Model, television and film actress. She is known for her role of Amrita in the Zee TV show Naaginn. She also appeared in shows like Kumkum – Ek Pyara Sa Bandhan, Sabki Laadli Bebo, Geet – Hui Sabse Parayi and Mrs. Kaushik Ki Paanch Bahuein.
- Niketan Madhok – Model.
- Karishma Kotak – Model. Karishma is a model born from London.
- Kashif Qureshi – Non-celebrity martial arts trainer. He got selected to be the "Common Man" (non-celebrity) via auditions held across India.
- Divya Vasudev – RJ.
- Rohin Robert – Actor.

=== Wild card entrants ===
- Mink Brar – Model, actress and producer.
- Vishal Karwal – Television actor.
- Imam Siddique – Fashion stylist and reality television personality.
- Santosh Shukla – Actor.

=== Guest entrants ===
- Jyoti Amge - Actress. Holds the Guinness World Record for being the smallest woman living on Earth.

== Guest appearances ==
- Daler Mehndi, Mona Lisa, Himesh Reshammiya and Rani Mukherjee made appearances on the premier of the season to welcome housemates to the new house.
- On 13 October 2012, Producer/Director Karan Johar and Bollywood Actors Alia Bhatt, Varun Dhawan and Sidharth Malhotra appeared on the eviction interview night to promote their upcoming film Student of the Year.
- On 20 October 2012, Bollywood Actors Sanjay Dutt, Sonakshi Sinha and Ajay Devgn appeared on the eviction interview night to promote their upcoming film Son of Sardaar.
- On 27 October 2012, Bollywood Actress Preity Zinta appeared on the eviction interview night to promote her upcoming film and production Ishkq in Paris.
- On 3 November 2012, Bigg Boss 4 winner Shweta Tiwari and finalist Dolly Bindra appeared on the eviction interview night.
- On 10 November 2012, Producer/Director & Salman's brother Arbaaz Khan appeared on the eviction interview night to promote Khan's upcoming film Dabangg 2. Hip hop singer and rapper Hard Kaur also appeared on the same night.
- On 24 November 2012, Bigg Boss 1 contestant and item girl Rakhi Sawant entered the Village as a guest for a short amount of time.
- On 28 November 2012, Actress Anjana Das and Stand-up comedian Bharti Singh entered the house as part of a task for a short amount of time.
- On 30 November 2012, Kareena Kapoor to have the first look of her song Fevicol se in Dabangg 2.
- On 1 December 2012, Yo Yo Honey Singh comes to promote Siftaan and Sudesh Lehri, Kapil Sharma, Bharti Singh, Aditya Narayan comes for the Enjoyment and Govinda and Sanjay dutt Comes for Salman Khan
- On 8 December 2012, Akshay kumar and Asin to promote their movie Khiladi 786.
- On 15 December 2012, Rashmi Desai appeared to flirt with Salman Khan.
- On 22 December 2012, Bipasha Basu appeared on the Eviction episode to promote her new fitness album "Break Free".
- On 29 December 2012, Anil Kapoor and Jacqueline Fernandez appeared on the eviction interview night to promote their movie Race 2.
- On 12 January 2013, Emraan Hashmi to promote his film Ek Thi Daayan. Prabhu Deva and Remo D'Souza to promote their film ABCD: Anybody Can Dance. Neha Dhupia, Tusshar Kapoor and comedians to promote their show "Nautanki". Yana Gupta to perform in the "Bigg Boss House". Asha Negi, Pooja Gaur, Rashami Desai and Rati Pandey to perform with Sampat Pal Devi on the "Bigg Boss" stage, Kapil Sharma for a comedy act. All of the evicted contestants also appeared for the Grand Finale.

== Nominations table ==
	Week 1		Week 2	Week 3	Week 4	Week 5	Week 6	Week 7	Week 8	Week 9	Week 10		Week 11	Week 12		Week 13		Week 14		
	Day 1	Day 2	Week 2	Week 3	Week 4	Week 5	Week 6	Week 7	Week 8	Week 9	Day 63	Day 66	Week 11	Day 80	Day 81	Day 83	Day 84	Day 91	Day 97	
Nominees for Captaincy		Aashka; Aseem; Delnaaz; Dinesh; Karishma; Kashif; Niketan; Rajev; Sampat; Sana; Sapna; Sayantani; Urvashi; Vrajesh	No; Captain	Aashka; Aseem; Delnaaz; Karishma; Niketan; Rajev; Sampat; Sana; Sapna; Sayantani; Urvashi; Vrajesh	Aashka; Aseem; Delnaaz; Karishma; Niketan; Rajev; Sampat; Sana; Sapna; Urvashi; Vrajesh	Aashka; Delnaaz; Niketan; Urvashi	Rajev; Sana; Urvashi	Rajev; Sana; Vishal	Delnaaz; Karishma; Niketan	No; Captain	Imam; Sana; Sapna; Vishal		Delnaaz; Imam	Delnaaz; Imam; Karishma; Niketan; Rajev; Sana; Sapna; Urvashi; Vishal		Delnaaz; Imam; Niketan; Rajev; Sana; Sapna; Urvashi		No; Captain		
House; Captain		Niketan	No; Captain	Vrajesh	Delnaaz	Aashka	Urvashi	~~Rajev~~; Sana	Karishma	No; Captain	Sapna		Delnaaz	Imam		Niketan		No; Captain		
Captain's Nomination		Sampat; Sana (to save)	No; Captain	Not eligible	Sidhu (to save)	Sampat	Sapna	Vishal; Delnaaz (to save)	Rajev; Delnaaz; Urvashi; Sana; Vishal	No; Captain	Not eligible	Karishma; Aashka; Urvashi	Imam	Not eligible		Imam; Delnaaz	Imam	No; Captain		
Vote to:	none	Evict		Save	Evict					None	Evict	Save	Evict	Win	None	Evict				
Urvashi	In House	Karishma; Sapna	Niketan; Rajev	Sidhu; Aashka	Aseem; Sampat	Niketan; Vrajesh	House; Captain	Vrajesh; Delnaaz	Vishal; Sana	No; Nominations	Delnaaz; Aashka	Niketan; Santosh	Vishal; Rajev	Niketan; Delnaaz; Urvashi	Not eligible	Imam; Delnaaz	Delnaaz; Sapna	No; Nominations	No; Nominations	Winner (Day 97)
Imam	Not In House							Secret Village (Days 41–42)	Secret Village (Days 48–51)	No; Nominations	Dinesh; Rajev	Sana; Delnaaz	Sapna; Niketan	House; Captain		Urvashi; Delnaaz	Rajev; Urvashi	No; Nominations	No; Nominations	1st runner-up (Day 97)
Imam	Not In House							Ejected (Day 42)	Secret Village (Days 48–51)	No; Nominations	Dinesh; Rajev	Sana; Delnaaz	Sapna; Niketan	House; Captain		Urvashi; Delnaaz	Rajev; Urvashi	No; Nominations	No; Nominations	1st runner-up (Day 97)
Sana	In House	Aseem; Dinesh	Sampat; Sayantani	Karishma; Aashka	Sampat; Karishma	Sapna; Niketan	Vrajesh; Niketan	House; Captain	Urvashi; Delnaaz	No; Nominations	Urvashi; Karishma	Aashka; Delnaaz	Karishma; Sapna	Delnaaz; Aashka; Rajev	Nominated	Imam; Sapna	Sapna; Urvashi	No; Nominations	No; Nominations	2nd runner-up (Day 97)
Niketan	In House	House; Captain	Kashif; Urvashi	Sidhu; Karishma	Sampat; Aashka	Sapna; Sana	Sana; Sapna	Sapna; Vrajesh	Sana; Vishal	No; Nominations	Vishal; Santosh	Urvashi; Karishma	Vishal; Sana	Urvashi; Niketan; Karishma	Not eligible	House; Captain		No; Nominations	No; Nominations	3rd runner-up (Day 97)
Rajev	In House	Aseem; Dinesh	Kashif; Aseem	Delnaaz; Sidhu	Sampat; Karishma	Sapna; Sana	Vrajesh; Aashka	Sapna; Vrajesh	Urvashi; Vishal	No; Nominations	Vishal; Karishma	Sana; Delnaaz	Vishal; Aashka	Urvashi; Delnaaz; Rajev	Not eligible	Imam; Sapna	Sapna; Urvashi	No; Nominations	Evicted (Day 96)	
Delnaaz	In House	Sampat; Sana	Sampat; Karishma	Sidhu; Aashka	House; Captain	Sana; Sapna	Niketan; Mink	Sapna; Mink	Urvashi; Vishal	No; Nominations	Urvashi; Rajev	Aashka; Sana	House; Captain	Urvashi; Aashka; Delnaaz	Not eligible	Imam; Sapna	Sana; Urvashi	No; Nominations	Evicted (Day 94)	
Sapna	In House	Aashka; Urvashi	Rajev; Sampat	Aseem; Sampat	Nominated	Sana; Vrajesh	Niketan; Mink	Rajev; Urvashi	Vishal; Urvashi	No; Nominations	House; Captain		Vishal; Sana	Urvashi; Delnaaz; Rajev	Nominated	Imam; Delnaaz	Sana; Urvashi	Evicted (Day 90)		
Aashka	In House	Karishma; Sapna	Sampat; Kashif	Sidhu; Delnaaz	Karishma; Niketan	House; Captain	Vrajesh; Niketan	Secret Village (Days 41–56)		No; Nominations	Urvashi; Imam	Sana; Delnaaz	Rajev; Karishma	Delnaaz; Urvashi; Sana	Nominated	Evicted (Day 83)				
Karishma	In House	Aashka; Urvashi	Sampat; Kashif	Sidhu; Sapna	Nominated	Walked (Day 24)		Vrajesh; Rajev	House; Captain	No; Nominations	Sana; Imam	Niketan; Urvashi	Sana; Vishal	Niketan; Urvashi; Delnaaz	Evicted (Day 80)					
Vishal	Not In House						Exempt	Vrajesh; Mink	Urvashi; Rajev	No; Nominations	Niketan; Rajev	Sana; Santosh	Rajev; Aashka	Evicted (Day 78)						
Vishal	Not In House						Exempt	Vrajesh; Mink	Secret Village (Days 55–56)	No; Nominations	Niketan; Rajev	Sana; Santosh	Rajev; Aashka	Evicted (Day 78)						
Santosh	Not In House								Secret Village (Days 48–56)	No; Nominations	Rajev; Niketan	Vishal; Karishma	Evicted (Day 69)							
Dinesh	In House	Karishma; Sapna	Evicted (Day 5)					Secret Village (Days 42–57)		No; Nominations	Imam; Aashka	Evicted (Day 66)								
Mink	Not In House					Exempt	Aashka; Sana	Delnaaz; Vishal	Vishal; Sana	No; Nominations	Evicted (Day 61)									
Vrajesh	In House	Sampat; Sana	Kashif; Rajev	House; Captain	Rajev; Sapna	Sapna; Sana	Aashka; Rajev	Sapna; Vishal	Secret Village (Days 48–56)	No; Nominations	Evicted (Day 61)									
Sampat	In House	Aseem; Dinesh	Kashif; Aseem	Sidhu; Delnaaz	Niketan; Sapna	Sana; Sapna	Evicted (Day 33)													
Sidhu	In House	Aseem; Dinesh	Niketan; Vrajesh	Aseem; Niketan	Nominated	Sana; Vrajesh	Walked (Day 33)													
Aseem	In House	Karishma; Sapna	Kashif; Rajev	Sidhu; Sapna	Nominated	Evicted (Day 27)														
Sayantani	In House	Sampat; Sana	Sapna; Kashif	Delnaaz; Sidhu	Evicted (Day 19)															
Kashif	Selected	Sampat; Sana	Rajev; Karishma	Evicted (Day 12)																
Divya	Not Selected	Evicted (Day 1)																		
Rohin	Not Selected	Evicted (Day 1)																		
Notes		1	2	3	4	5	6	7	8	9	10	11	12	13		14		15	16	
Against Public Vote	Divya; Kashif; Rohin	Aseem; Dinesh; Karishma; ~~Sampat~~; ~~Sana~~; Sapna	Kashif; Rajev; ~~Sampat~~	Rajev; ~~Sana~~; Sayantani; Urvashi	Aseem; Karishma; Sampat; Sapna; ~~Sidhu~~	Sampat; Sapna; Vrajesh	Aashka; Niketan; Sapna; Vrajesh	~~Delnaaz~~; Mink; Rajev; Sapna; ~~Vishal~~; Vrajesh	Sana; Urvashi; Vishal	Aashka; Delnaaz; Dinesh; Imam; Karishma; Mink; Niketan; Rajev; Sana; Santosh; Sapna; Urvashi; Vishal; Vrajesh	Delnaaz; Dinesh; Sana; Santosh	Imam; Niketan; Rajev; Santosh; Vishal	Imam; Sana; Rajev; Vishal	Aashka; Karishma; Sana; Sapna	Aashka; Sana; Sapna	Delnaaz; Imam; Sapna; Urvashi		Delnaaz; Imam; Niketan; Sana; Rajev; Urvashi	Imam; Niketan; Sana; Urvashi	
Re-entered	none						Karishma	Imam	none											
Re-entered	none						Dinesh	Imam	none											
Secret Village	none							Aashka		none										
Secret Village	none							Dinesh		none										
Secret Village	none							Imam		none										
Secret Village	none								Santosh	none										
Secret Village	none								Vrajesh	none										
Secret Village	none								Vishal	none										
Walked	none				Karishma	Sidhu	none													
Ejected	none							Imam	none											
Evicted	Divya	Dinesh	Kashif	Sayantani	Aseem	Sampat	No eviction			Vrajesh	Dinesh	Santosh	Vishal	Karishma	Aashka	Sapna		Delnaaz	Niketan	Sana
Evicted	Rohin	Dinesh	Kashif	Sayantani	Aseem	Sampat	No eviction			Mink	Dinesh	Santosh	Vishal	Karishma	Aashka	Sapna		Rajev	Imam	Urvashi

indicates that the Housemate was directly nominated for eviction.
indicates that the Housemate was immune prior to nominations.
indicates the contestant has been evicted.
indicates the contestant walked out due to emergency.
indicates the contestant has been ejected.
indicates the house captain.

=== Nomination notes ===
- ^Note 1: Housemates were grouped into seven pairs. Niketan, for not being chosen by any housemate to form a pair, was made the House captain. Each pair nominated another pair with consensus when called into the confession room. Vote against a pair added one vote against each individual in the respective pair. The housemates however faced eviction individually.
- ^Note 2: Sidhu refused to vote when called into the confession room, therefore, as punishment Bigg Boss nominated all housemates. This created conflicts among housemates and resulted in protests against Bigg Boss. Sidhu was asked to reconsider nominating two housemates. Nominations concluded when Sidhu contemplated on giving the two names.
- ^Note 3: In a twist to nominations housemates were told to nominate two houses they would like to save from eviction. Vrajesh being the house captain was immune and was not asked to nominate. With receiving no save votes Rajev, Sana, Sayantani and Urvashi were, therefore, nominated.
- ^Note 4: Aseem, Karishma, Sapna and Sidhu were nominated as punishment. Sampat having received the highest number of nominations was also added to the nominations list.
- ^Note 5: Before nominations Sana was given a secret task to garner the highest nominations by convincing her fellow housemates to vote for her. Succeeding in the task will save her from eviction however if she did not receive the highest number of votes, she will be automatically nominated by Bigg Boss. Aashka as captain nominated Sampat directly placing her up for eviction. Sana having received seven out of eight potential votes was spared eviction and Sapna and Vrajesh were, in turn, added to the nominations list.
- ^Note 6: Prior to the voting Urvashi as captain was asked to directly nominate one housemate for eviction. She chose Sapna. Remaining housemates nominated Aashka, Niketan and Vrajesh.
- ^Note 7: Rajev was removed from captaincy as he was found discussing nomination with Niketan and Vishal. Hence, Sana was made captain. Post nominations she was asked to save two housemates from eviction. She chose Vishal and Delnaaz.
- ^Note 8: Karishma as the house captain was asked to take names of five housemates whom she would like the housemates to vote for nominations. Consequently, Sapna, Mink and Niketan became immune. Housemates nominated Sana, Urvashi and Vishal.
- ^Note 9: After the housemates living in the secret village entered the main house, Bigg Boss announced that all fourteen housemates will be put up for eviction and two of them will be evicted. Hence, no nominations took place.
- ^Note 10: In a twist to nominations, housemates with the fewest votes were nominated for eviction.
- ^Note 11: Housemates were asked to save two of their fellow inmates from eviction. With receiving the lowest number of save votes Imam, Niketan, Rajev, Santosh and Vishal were nominated.
- ^Note 12: As a reward for her being successful in the secret task, Urvashi was made immune from nominations. Housemates voted to evict and Imam, Sana, Rajev and Vishal were nominated for eviction.
- ^Note 13: In a twist to nominations, housemates were asked to name three housemates, which may include theirs as well, who they think deserve to win. Owing to receiving the fewest votes Aashka, Karishma, Sana and Sapna were put up for eviction. Karishma was evicted from the house in a surprise mid-week eviction with the aid of a teleportation Magical act. Bigg Boss revealed that the voting lines have remained open only for a day and another housemate will be evicted on Friday.
- ^Note 14: Two nominations took place. For the first housemates voted openly on the interview night before Salman. The other involved housemates' family/friends who nominated on their behalf.
- ^Note 15: During the final week the public initially voted for who they wanted to evict. Delnaaz and Rajev were evicted respectively as a consequence. Audience voted for the four remaining housemates to win Bigg Boss, the three housemates with the fewest votes were evicted on Day 97 (the finale) with the Winner revealed on the same night.
- ^Note 16: In the grand finale; Niketan and Sana was evicted from the house and was declared in 3rd & 4th place. Later the top 2 housemates Imam & Urvashi left the house and entered the stage where Urvashi was declared as the winner.

== Ratings ==
The final episode on 12 January clocked a 4.4 TVR (television rating points), becoming the highest-rated non-fiction show during the week. The finale also fared better than its previous season, which had dropped to 3.6 TVR. In the fourth season, the finale had clocked a 6.7 TVR. The fall in the ratings last year had forced the channel to tweak the format a bit and make it more family-oriented. The show averaged 3.3 TVR in the week ended 12 January compared to 2.8 in the trailing week.
