= Prakash Narain Tripathi =

Indian politician

Member of Parliament, Lok Sabha
- In office 1977–1980
- Preceded by: Ram Sajeevan
- Succeeded by: Ram Sajeevan
- Constituency: Banda

Personal details
- Born: 1 January 1930 Tikaria, Banda district, India
- Party: Samajwadi Party
- Other political affiliations: Bharatiya Janata Party
- Spouse: Shushila Devi Tripathi
- Education: B.A. (Allahabad University)

Prakash Narain Tripathi is an Indian politician from Samajwadi Party. He was elected as a member of 10th Lok Sabha from Banda on Bharatiya Janata Party ticket. He joined Indian National Congress in 2004 then Samajwadi Party in 2009
