= Purushottam Naresh Dwivedi =

Indian politician (died 2021)

Purushottam Naresh Dwivedi (1965/1966 – 22 April 2021) was an Indian politician, latterly in prison on rape charges. As a member of the Bahujan Samaj Party, he won the 2007 Uttar Pradesh state assembly elections from Naraini in southern Uttar Pradesh, and he was elected an MLA.

In December 2010, he was charged with the rape of a seventeen-year-old girl from a Scheduled Caste. An initial inquiry by the state CID found the charges to be prima facie true, and he was arrested on 13 January 2011.

He was suspended from the party by the BSP chief Mayawati in January 2011. He died on 22 April 2021 at the age of 55 from kidney disease while serving his prison sentence.

== Rape case, 2010 ==
In November 2010, the victim named Neelu by the media (not her real name), of Majra Banantapurwa of Harnampur village in Panna District, was abducted and allegedly sold to one Rajju from a neighbouring village. The village pradhan (head) and a constable were responsible for the abduction. The girl's father, Achhe Lal, eventually recovered her, and went to Purushottam Naresh, who is the local MLA, seeking redress of their grievances. It was decided that the girl would stay in Purushottam's house, where she would have adequate protection. It appears that on 10 and 11 December, Neelu was raped repeatedly by Purushottam and two of his bodyguards.

Subsequently, she managed to escape and lodged rape charges with the police. However, Purushottam levied theft charges against her and on 15 December, the police arrested her. Her father Achhe Lal was threatened but he went underground and approached the Gulabi Gang, a group of woman vigilantes in Banda. This helped publicize the case.

After the matter was spotlighted in the media, the National Council of Women, as well as politicians from opposition parties, highlighted the case. The case was investigated by the CB-CID and a medical report of the victim confirmed violent sexual assault; the CB-CID found the rape charges to be prima facie true.

Under pressure from colleagues in the BSP party, which claims to represent the backward castes, Chief Minister Mayawati suspended Naresh from the party on 3 January.

Purushottam was arrested on 13 January. A few days later, after more than a month in jail, the girl was released on 17 January 2011. In August 2011, the Supreme Court of India, sent a notice to the state of Uttar Pradesh for arresting the girl in violation of the Juvenile Justice Act.

On 12 September 2011, unhappy with the state's handling of the case, the Supreme Court of India ordered the investigations to be handed over to the Central Bureau of Investigation.

Naresh's wife Aasha Dwivedi has sought to join the opposing Samajwadi Party to represent the constituency in the forthcoming elections.
