= Baberu Assembly constituency =

Constituency of the Uttar Pradesh legislative assembly in India

Coordinates: 25.55°N 80.70°E

Baberu
- Constituency No. 233 for the Uttar Pradesh Legislative Assembly

Constituency details
- Country: India
- Region: North India
- State: Uttar Pradesh
- District: Banda
- Total electors: 3,38,211
- Reservation: None

Member of Legislative Assembly
- 18th Uttar Pradesh Legislative Assembly
- Incumbent Vishambhar Singh Yadav
- Party: Samajwadi Party
- Elected year: 2022
- Preceded by: Chandrapal Kushwaha

Baberu is a constituency of the Uttar Pradesh Legislative Assembly covering the city of Baberu in the Banda district of Uttar Pradesh, India. Baberu is one of five assembly constituencies in the Banda Lok Sabha constituency. Since 2008, this assembly constituency is numbered 233 amongst 403 constituencies.

This seat belonged to Bharatiya Janta Party candidate Chandrapal Kushwaha who won in the 2017 Uttar Pradesh Legislative Elections defeating Bahujan Samaj Party candidate Kiran Yadav by a margin of 22,301 votes.

In the 2022 Uttar Pradesh Legislative Assembly election, Vishambhar Singh Yadav of Samajwadi Party won the seat by securing 79093 votes.

== Members of the Legislative Assembly ==
Year	Member	Party
1952	Ram Sanehi Bhartiya	Indian National Congress
1957	Ram Sanehi Bhartiya	Indian National Congress
1962	Deshraj Singh	Independent politician
1967	Deshraj Singh	Indian National Congress
1969	Durjan	Communist Party of India
1974	Dev Kumar Yadav	Communist Party of India
1977	Dev Kumar Yadav	Communist Party of India
1980	Rameshwar Prasad	Indian National Congress (Indira)
1985	Dev Kumar Yadav	Independent politician
1989	Dev Kumar Yadav	Indian National Congress
1991	Gaya Charan Dinkar	Bahujan Samaj Party
1993	Gaya Charan Dinkar	Bahujan Samaj Party
1996	Shiv Shankar	Bharatiya Janata Party
2002	Gaya Charan Dinkar	Bahujan Samaj Party
2007	Vishambhar Singh Yadav	Samajwadi Party
2012	Vishambhar Singh Yadav	Samajwadi Party
2017	Chandrapal Kushwaha	Bharatiya Janata Party
2022	Vishambhar Singh Yadav	Samajwadi Party

== Election results ==
=== 2027 ===
2027 Uttar Pradesh Legislative Assembly election: Baberu
Party	Candidate	Votes	%	±%
INDIA				
NDA				
BSP				
NOTA	None of the above			
Majority				
Turnout				
gain from		Swing		

=== 2022 ===
2022 Uttar Pradesh Legislative Assembly election: Baberu
Party	Candidate	Votes	%	±%
SP	Vishambhar Singh Yadav	79,614	38.75	+12.09
BJP	Ajay Patel	72,221	35.15	−4.14
BSP	Ramsevak Shukla	37,009	18.01	−9.78
Jan Adhikar Party	Ashok Kumar	4,458	2.17	+1.17
INC	Gajendra Singh Patel	2,112	1.03	
ASP(KR)	Simmi Burman	1,944	0.95	
NOTA	None of the above	3,047	1.48	−0.39
Majority		7,393	3.6	−7.9
Turnout		205,453	60.75	+1.61
SP gain from BJP		Swing		

=== 2017 ===
2017 Uttar Pradesh Legislative Assembly election: Baberu
Party	Candidate	Votes	%	±%
BJP	Chandrapal Kushwaha	76,187	39.29	
BSP	Kiran Yadav	53,886	27.79	
SP	Vishambhar Singh Yadav	51,693	26.66	
Independent	Rajbahadur	2,881	1.49	
CPI	Haseeb Ali	2,788	1.44	
Jan Adhikar Party	Shiv Sharan	1,941	1.0	
NOTA	None of the above	3,559	1.87	
Majority		22,301	11.5	
Turnout		193,900	59.14	
BJP gain from SP		Swing		
