= Babu Lal Kushwaha =

Former minister in Government of Uttar Pradesh

Member of Uttar Pradesh Legislative Assembly
- In office 1997–2002
- Constituency: Naraini Assembly constituency

Member of Uttar Pradesh Legislative Assembly
- In office 2002–2007
- Constituency: Banda, Uttar Pradesh Assembly constituency

Personal details
- Born: 2 June 1941 (age 84) Banda district, Uttar Pradesh
- Party: Bahujan Samaj Party
- Spouse: Kaushalya Devi

Babu Lal Kushwaha was an Indian politician based in Uttar Pradesh, who served as member of Uttar Pradesh Legislative Assembly twice. Kushwaha was a member of Bahujan Samaj Party and a minister in Government of Uttar Pradesh in Bahujan Samaj Party government. He was elected from Naraini Assembly constituency in 1996 Assembly elections and from Banda Assembly constituency in 2002 Assembly elections.

== Life and political career ==
Babu Lal Kushwaha was born on 2 June 1941 to Basudev Kushwaha in a village called Chaktakuli in Banda district of Uttar Pradesh. He completed his bachelor's degree in Arts and then pursued another bachelor's degree in law. He married Kaushalya Devi in 1958. They had seven sons from the marriage. Kushwaha was a practicing lawyer and an agriculturist, prior to beginning his political career with the Bahujan Samaj Party.

He was given ticket for the first time by party in mid-term elections held in October–November 1996. In this election he defeated Surendra Pal Verma of Samajwadi Party. He got 45,173 votes to secure victory against Verma. He had contested in this election from Naraini Assembly constituency of Banda district of Uttar Pradesh. From 27 March 1997 to 19 October 1997, he was made a minister of state with independent charges in Bahujan Samaj Party government. He assumed the charges of Handloom, Silk Industry and Regional Development ministries. Between 2000 and 2001, he also served as a member of Committee on Public Undertaking of the Uttar Pradesh Legislative Assembly.

In 2002, he ran for the state assembly elections for the second time. He defeated Jamuna Prasad Bose of Samajwadi Party in this election by securing 36,748 votes.
