= Korra Bujurg, Banda =

Village in Uttar Pradesh, India

Korra Bujurg is a village in the Baberu tehsil, Banda district, Uttar Pradesh state, India.
