= Brajesh Kumar Prajapati =

Indian politician

MLA, 17th Legislative Assembly
- In office 2017–2022
- Preceded by: Jagadish Kumar Prajapati
- Succeeded by: Ramkesh Nishad
- Constituency: Tindwari

Personal details
- Born: Banda, Uttar Pradesh
- Education: Bundelkhand University; Dr. Ram Manohar Lohia Avadh University
- Occupation: MLA
- Profession: Politician

Brajesh Kumar Prajapati is an Indian politician and a former member of 17th Legislative Assembly, Uttar Pradesh of India. He represents the ‘Tindwari’ constituency in Banda district of Uttar Pradesh.

== Political career ==
Brajesh Kumar Prajapati has got 82197 votes where as Jagdish Prasad Prajapati has got 44790 votes. Daljeet Singh, member of Indian National Congress received 42089 votes and got third position in Uttar Pradesh Pradesh assembly elections 2017. Total 169076 voters have used their voting rights to cast their votes for Bharatiya Janata Party, Bahujan Samaj Party and Indian National Congress and Bharatiya Janata Party is winner by 37407 votes in assembly elections 2017 from seat of Uttar Pradesh.

Brajesh Kumar Prajapati contested Uttar Pradesh Assembly Election as Bharatiya Janata Party candidate and defeated his close contestant Jagadish Prasad Prajapati from Bahujan Samaj Party with a margin of 37,407 votes.

== Posts held ==
#	From	To	Position	Comments
01	2017	2022	Member, 17th Legislative Assembly	
