= Ambika Prasad Pandey =

Indian politician

Member of Parliament, Lok Sabha
- In office 1971–1977
- Preceded by: Ram Ratan Sharma
- Succeeded by: Ramnath Dubey
- Constituency: Banda

Personal details
- Born: 25 October 1937 Lohara, Banda district, India
- Party: Janata Party
- Other political affiliations: Bharatiya Lok Dal; Bharatiya Jan Sangh
- Spouse: Raj Kumari Pandey

Ambika Prasad Pandey is an Indian former politician from Bharatiya Jan Sangh. He was elected as a member of the 6th Lok Sabha from Banda. He contested the 1974 Uttar Pradesh Legislative Assembly election but lost. He was imprisoned for about 4 months under the emergency Defence of India Rules.
