= Atarra railway station =

Railway station in Uttar Pradesh, India

Atarra

General information
- Location: Atarra, Uttar Pradesh; India
- Coordinates: 25.291210°N 80.576426°E
- Elevation: 138 metres (453 ft)
- System: Express train and Passenger train station
- Owner: Indian Railways
- Operator: North Central Railway zone
- Platforms: 2
- Tracks: 2
- Connections: Auto stand

Construction
- Structure type: Standard (on ground station)
- Parking: No
- Cycle facilities: No

Other information
- Status: Construction – Single-line
- Station code: ATE
- Zone(s): North Central Railway zone
- Division(s): Jhansi

History
- Opened: 24 hours
- Rebuilt: Yes
- Electrified: Yes, Line Electrified.

Services
Preceding station	Indian Railways	Following station
Khurhand towards ?	West Central Railway zone Khairar–Ohan branch line	Badausa towards ?
Location
- Location within India Location within Uttar Pradesh

Atarra railway station is a grade B railway station in the Banda district, Uttar Pradesh with code ATE. It serves Atarra town.

== Infrastructure ==
The station consists of two platforms. The station is a Category A station of Jhansi railway division of the North Central Railway zone. There is no waiting room for AC and NON-AC. Public washroom are available to all.
