= Ram Ratan Sharma =

Indian politician

Member of Parliament, Lok Sabha
- In office 1971–1977
- Preceded by: Chaudhary Jageshwar Singh Yadav
- Succeeded by: Ambika Prasad Pandey
- Constituency: Banda

Personal details
- Born: October 30, 1929 Lohara, Banda district, India
- Party: Bharatiya Jan Sangh
- Spouse: Sunita Sharma
- Children: 5
- Education: Sagar University (LLB)

Ram Ratan Sharma is an Indian politician from Bharatiya Jan Sangh. He was elected as a member of 5th Lok Sabha from Banda on Bharatiya Jan Sangh ticket. He was born in a small village Lohra near Banda.
