= Chandrapal Kushwaha =

Indian politician

MLA, 17th Legislative Assembly
- Incumbent
- Assumed office 2017
- Constituency: Baberu, Banda, Uttar Pradesh

Personal details
- Born: 18 May 1956 (age 69) Baberu, Banda, India
- Party: Bharatiya Janata Party
- Occupation: MLA
- Profession: Politician

Chandrapal Kushwaha is an Indian politician and a member of 17th Legislative Assembly, Uttar Pradesh of India. He represents the ‘Baberu’ constituency in Banda district of Uttar Pradesh.

== Political career ==
Chandrapal Kushwaha has got 76,187 votes where as Kiran Yadav has got 53,886 votes. Bishambhar Singh, member of Samajwadi Party received 51,693 votes and got third position in Uttar Pradesh Pradesh assembly elections 2017. Total 181,766 voters have used their voting rights to cast their votes for Bharatiya Janata Party, Bahujan Samaj Party and Samajwadi Party and Bharatiya Janata Party is winner by 22,301 votes in assembly elections 2017 from seat of Uttar Pradesh.

Chandrapal Kushwaha contested Uttar Pradesh Assembly Election as Bharatiya Janata Party candidate and defeated his close contestant Kiran Yadav from Bahujan Samaj Party with a margin of 22,301 votes.

== Posts held ==
#	From	To	Position	Comments
01	2017	Incumbent	Member, 17th Legislative Assembly	
