= Aanand Shukla =

Indian politician

Aanand Shukla is an Indian politician. He was elected to the Uttar Pradesh Legislative Assembly from Manikpur in the 2019 by election as a member of the Bharatiya Janata Party. By-elections happen due to R. K. Singh Patel elected to Parliament.
