= Badausa =

Badausa may refer to:

- Badausa, Uttar Pradesh, city in India
- Moth genus Hypena, 1863 synonym
