= Badausa, Uttar Pradesh =

Coordinates: 25°15′N 80°39′E

Badausa
- Town
- Interactive map of Badausa
- Country: India
- State: Uttar Pradesh
- Division: Chitrakoot
- District: Banda

Population
  - Total: 31

Badausa is a town in Uttar Pradesh, India. It comes under Chitrakoot Division, Banda District and Atarra tehsil of Uttar Pradesh. The PIN code of Badausa is 210202.
