= Savitri Nigam =

Indian politician

Member of Parliament, Rajya Sabha
- In office 1952-1962
- Constituency: Uttar Pradesh

Member of Parliament, Lok Sabha
- In office 1962-1967
- Preceded by: Raja Dinesh Singh
- Succeeded by: Chaudhary Jageshwar Singh Yadav
- Constituency: Banda, Uttar Pradesh

Personal details
- Born: 17 May 1919 Banda, United Provinces, British India (present-day Uttar Pradesh, India)
- Died: 29 July 1985 (aged 66)
- Party: Indian National Congress
- Spouse: Brijnandan Prasad Nigam
- Children: 2 daughters

Savitri Nigam (1919-1985) was an Indian politician. She was a Member of Parliament, representing Uttar Pradesh in the Rajya Sabha the upper house of India's Parliament and to the Lok Sabha, lower house of the Parliament of India from Banda, Uttar Pradesh as a member of the Indian National Congress.

She also served as President of Indian Federation of United Nations Associations.

She was board member at the Food & Nutrition Board, Govt. of India. Also the President of Indian Housawives Federation.

Emphasizing on women education she said:

"A self-centered person cannot be self-sufficient because that person lives like a parasite."
