= Shivshankar Singh Patel =

Indian politician

Shivshankar Singh Patel is an Indian politician and member of the Samajwadi Party. He was a member of the Uttar Pradesh Legislative Assembly, elected three times from Baberu, and was a Minister of State in Kalyan Singh's Uttar Pradesh Government. He was a member of the Bharatiya Janata Party, was expelled after he protested against his party in 2021 and joined the Samajwadi Party the same year.
