= Banda, Uttar Pradesh Assembly constituency =

Constituency of the Uttar Pradesh legislative assembly in India

Coordinates: 25.49°N 80.34°E

Banda
- Constituency No. 235 for the Uttar Pradesh Legislative Assembly

Constituency details
- Country: India
- Region: North India
- State: Uttar Pradesh
- District: Banda
- Total electors: 3,10,282
- Reservation: None

Member of Legislative Assembly
- 18th Uttar Pradesh Legislative Assembly
- Incumbent Prakash Dwivedi
- Party: Bharatiya Janta Party
- Elected year: 2022
- Preceded by: Vivek Kumar Singh

Banda is a constituency of the Uttar Pradesh Legislative Assembly covering the city of Banda in the Banda district of Uttar Pradesh, India. Banda is one of five assembly constituencies in the Lok Sabha constituency of Banda. Since 2008, this assembly constituency is numbered 235 amongst 403 constituencies.

Currently this seat belongs to Bharatiya Janta Party candidate Prakash Dwivedi who won in last Assembly election of 2017 Uttar Pradesh Legislative Elections defeating Bahujan Samaj Party candidate Madhusudan Kushwaha by a margin of 32,828 votes.

== Members of the Legislative Assembly ==
Elected year	MLA	Party
1952	Pahalwan Singh	Indian National Congress
1957	Pahalwan Singh	Indian National Congress
1962	Brij Mohan Lal Gupta	Indian National Congress
1967	G. S. Saraf	Bharatiya Jana Sangh
1969	Mahiraj Dhwaj Singh	Indian National Congress
1974	Jamuna Prasad Bose	Socialist Party
1977	Jamuna Prasad Bose	Janata Party
1980	Chandra Prakash Sharma	Indian National Congress (Indira)
1985	Jamuna Prasad Bose	Janata Party
1989	Jamuna Prasad Bose	Janata Dal
1991	Nasimuddin Siddiqui	Bahujan Samaj Party
1993	Raj Kumar Shivhare	Bharatiya Janata Party
1996	Vivek Kumar Singh	Indian National Congress
2002	Babu Lal Kushwaha	Bahujan Samaj Party
2007	Vivek Kumar Singh	Indian National Congress
2012	Vivek Kumar Singh	Indian National Congress
2017	Prakash Dwivedi	Bharatiya Janata Party
2022	Prakash Dwivedi	Bharatiya Janata Party

== Election results ==
=== 2027 ===
2027 Uttar Pradesh Legislative Assembly election: Banda
Party	Candidate	Votes	%	±%
INDIA				
NDA				
BSP				
NOTA	None of the above			
Majority				
Turnout				
gain from		Swing		

=== 2022 ===
2022 Uttar Pradesh Legislative Assembly election: Banda
Party	Candidate	Votes	%	±%
BJP	Prakash Dwivedi	81,557	41.34	−4.27
SP	Manjula Singh	66,343	33.63	
BSP	Dheeraj Prakash	38,284	19.4	−8.21
Jan Adhikar Party	Hanuman Das	3,776	1.91	+1.31
INC	Laxminarayan	1,894	0.96	−16.71
NOTA	None of the above	1,991	1.01	+0.47
Majority		15,214	7.71	−10.29
Turnout		197,300	63.59	+3.65
BJP hold		Swing		

=== 2017 ===
2017 Uttar Pradesh Legislative Assembly election: Banda
Party	Candidate	Votes	%	±%
BJP	Prakash Dwivedi	83,169	45.61	
BSP	Madhusudan Kushwaha	50,341	27.61	
INC	Vivek Kumar Singh	32,223	17.67	
Independent	Mohd. Aslam	2,736	1.5	
CPI	Shyam Sunder Singh	1,953	1.07	
Sarv Sambhaav Party	Vimal Krishan	1,642	0.9	
NOTA	None of the above	979	0.54	
Majority		32,828	18.0	
Turnout		182,334	59.94	
