= Avinash Chandra Dwivedi =

Indian politician (born 1959)

Member of the 18th Uttar Pradesh Assembly
- Incumbent
- Assumed office March 2022
- Preceded by: Ananda Shukla
- Constituency: Manikpur

Personal details
- Born: 31 December 1959 (age 66) Kosambi, Uttar Pradesh, India
- Party: Apna Dal (Sonelal)
- Spouse: Sushma Dwivedi
- Parent: Raj Bhavan Dwivedi (father)
- Profession: Politician

Avinash Chandra Dwivedi is an Indian politician and a member of the 18th Uttar Pradesh Assembly from the Manikpur Assembly constituency of the Chitrakoot district. He is a member of the Apna Dal (Sonelal).

== Early life ==
Avinash Chandra Dwivedi was born on 31 December 1959 in Kosambi, Uttar Pradesh, to a Hindu family of Raj Bhavan Dwivedi. He married Sushma Dwivedi, and they had two child.

== Positions held ==
#	From	To	Position	Comments
01	2022	Incumbent	Member, 18th Uttar Pradesh Assembly	

== See also ==
- 18th Uttar Pradesh Assembly
- Manikpur Assembly constituency
- Uttar Pradesh Legislative Assembly
