= Tindwari Assembly constituency =

Constituency of the Uttar Pradesh legislative assembly in India

Coordinates: 25.62°N 80.53°E

Tindwari
- Constituency No. 232 for the Uttar Pradesh Legislative Assembly

Constituency details
- Country: India
- Region: North India
- State: Uttar Pradesh
- District: Banda
- Total electors: 3,18,385
- Reservation: None

Member of Legislative Assembly
- 18th Uttar Pradesh Legislative Assembly
- Incumbent Ramakesh Nishad
- Party: Bharatiya Janta Party
- Elected year: 2022

Tindwari is a constituency of the Uttar Pradesh Legislative Assembly covering the city of Tindwari in the Banda district of Uttar Pradesh, India.

Tindwari is one of five assembly constituencies in the Hamirpur (Uttar Pradesh Lok Sabha constituency). Since 2008, this assembly constituency is numbered 232 amongst 403 constituencies.

== Members of the Legislative Assembly ==
Year	Member	Party
1974	Jagannath Singh	Bharatiya Jana Sangh
1977	Jagannath Singh	Janata Party
1980	Shiv Pratap Singh	Indian National Congress (I)
1981^	Vishwanath Pratap Singh	Indian National Congress (I)
1985	Arjun Singh	Indian National Congress
1989	Chandrabhan Singh	Janata Dal
1991	Vishambhar Nishad	Bahujan Samaj Party
1993	Vishambhar Nishad	Bahujan Samaj Party
1996	Mahendra Pal Nishad	Bahujan Samaj Party
2002	Vishambhar Nishad	Samajwadi Party
2007	Vishambhar Nishad	Samajwadi Party
2012	Daljeet Singh	Indian National Congress
2017	Brajesh Prajapati	Bharatiya Janata Party
2022	Ramakesh Nishad	Bharatiya Janata Party

== Election results ==
=== 2027 ===
2027 Uttar Pradesh Legislative Assembly election: Tindwari
Party	Candidate	Votes	%	±%
INDIA				
NDA				
BSP				
NOTA	None of the above			
Majority				
Turnout				
gain from		Swing		

=== 2022 ===
Bharatiya Janta Party candidate Ramkesh Nishad won in 2022 Uttar Pradesh Legislative Elections defeating Samajwadi Party candidate Brajesh Kumar Prajapati by a margin of 28,684 votes

2022 Uttar Pradesh Legislative Assembly election: Tindwari
Party	Candidate	Votes	%	±%
BJP	Ramkesh Nishad	86,812	44.24	−0.23
SP	Brajesh Kumar Prajapati	58,387	29.76	
BSP	Jayram Singh	39,450	20.1	−4.13
CPI	Ramchandra	2,868	1.46	−0.33
INC	Adishakti	2,586	1.32	−21.45
NOTA	None of the above	2,267	1.16	−0.42
Majority		28,425	14.48	−5.76
Turnout		196,221	61.63	+1.94
BJP hold		Swing		

=== 2017 ===
Bharatiya Janta Party candidate Brajesh Kumar Prajapati won in 2017 Uttar Pradesh Legislative Elections defeating BSP candidate by a margin of 34k+ votes.

2017 Uttar Pradesh Legislative Assembly Election: Tindwar
Party	Candidate	Votes	%	±%
BJP	Brajesh Kumar Prajapati	82,197	44.47	
BSP	Jagdish Prasad Prajapati	44,790	24.23	
INC	Daljeet Singh	42,089	22.77	
LKD	Ramkaran Singh Bachchan	4,688	2.54	
CPI	Shyam Babu	3,304	1.79	
NOTA	None of the above	2,875	1.58	
Majority		37,407	20.24	
Turnout		184,823	59.69	
