= Ramakesh Nishad =

Indian politician

Ramkesh Nishad

State Minister of Jal Shakti Government of Uttar Pradesh
- Incumbent
- Assumed office 25 March 2022
- Minister: Swatantra Dev Singh
- Chief Minister: Yogi Adityanath

Member of 18th Uttar Pradesh Assembly
- Incumbent
- Assumed office 2022
- Preceded by: Brajesh Kumar Prajapati
- Constituency: Tindwari

Personal details
- Party: Bharatiya Janata Party
- Occupation: Politician

Ramkesh Nishad is an Indian politician and a member of the 18th Uttar Pradesh Assembly for Uttar Pradesh, India. He represents the Tindwari constituency of Uttar Pradesh. He is a member of the Bharatiya Janata Party.

== Career ==
Nishad, as a Bharatiya Janta Party candidate, won the 2022 Uttar Pradesh Legislative Assembly election, defeating Samajwadi Party candidate Brajesh Kumar Prajapati by a margin of 28,425 votes.

On 25 March 2022, the Chief Minister of Uttar Pradesh, Yogi Adityanath and former minister of Jal Shakti Dinesh Khatik, appointed Nishad as the State Minister of Jal Shakti in the Uttar Pradesh government.
