= Gulaab Gang =

- Theatrical release poster
- Directed by: Soumik Sen
- Written by: Soumik Sen; Anubhav Sinha
- Produced by: Anubhav Sinha; Alumbra Entertainment; Abhinay Deo
- Starring: Madhuri Dixit; Juhi Chawla
- Narrated by: Anil Kapoor
- Cinematography: Alphonse Roy
- Edited by: Cheragh Todiwala
- Music by: Songs: Soumik Sen; Score: John Stewart Eduri
- Production company: Benaras Media Works
- Distributed by: Sahara Movie Studios
- Release date: 7 March 2014
- Running time: 139 minutes
- Country: India
- Language: Hindi
- Budget: ₹29 crore
- Box office: est.₹22.7 crore

Gulaab Gang (transl. Rose gang) is a 2014 Indian Hindi-language action drama film centered on the struggle of women in India, directed and co-written by Soumik Sen and produced by Anubhav Sinha. It stars Madhuri Dixit and Juhi Chawla in lead roles, marking the first time that the two female superstars of the 1990s shared screen space together.

Gulaab Gang was released on 7 March 2014, and declared the film a flop on its opening day itself. It received mixed reviews from critics; however, Chawla's performance received widespread critical acclaim, with several critics deeming it "the best performance of the year."

At the 60th Filmfare Awards, Gulaab Gang earned Chawla a nomination for Best Supporting Actress for her performance in the film.

== Plot ==
The Gulaab Gang members are activists and vigilantes in Bundelkhand, Uttar Pradesh, and Madhya Pradesh. They wear pink sarees and take up issues like domestic violence, the dowry system, rape, electricity matters, and education. Their fierce leader, Rajjo (Madhuri Dixit), locks horns with a conniving and shrewd politician, Sumitra Devi Bagrecha (Juhi Chawla), who uses people.

Rajjo runs a Gulaab gang in the village of Madhopur, where she teaches little girls their alphabet and grown-up girls how to wield a lathi. Her gang is made up of women who wear bright pink. Rajjo's closest friends in the gang are a tomboy (Divya Jagdale), a woman abandoned by her husband (Tannishtha Chatterjee), and a kohl-eyed woman (Priyanka Bose). These ladies go about standing up for the meek and the downtrodden and clashing against villainous husbands, cops, and politicians. The plot gains momentum when Rajjo decides to take part in the local elections against Sumitra Devi. Sumitra does her best to make sure Rajjo is incapacitated during election campaigns by having most of her gang members killed by the henchmen. Towards the end, Rajjo decides to take revenge against Sumitra. During Holi celebrations, when Sumitra conspires to finish off the Gulaab Gang, Rajjo retaliates by chopping off Sumitra Devi's hand as the latter tries to shoot the gang with a machine gun. In the end, Sumitra is arrested and sentenced to life in prison, and Rajjo is also arrested for her violent retribution. However, Rajjo eventually realises her dream of establishing a school for unprivileged girls.

== Cast ==
- Madhuri Dixit as Rajjo
- Juhi Chawla as Sumitra Devi (Bagrecha)
- Tannishtha Chatterjee as Kajri
- Divya Jagdale as Mahi
- Priyanka Bose as Sandhya
- Lata S Singh as Tarabhai
- Vinitha Menon as Vinita
- Rani Patel as Khushboo
- Ankit Anil Sharma as Sarju
- Tanvi Rao as Fiza
- Sudev Nair as Arun Shankar
- Lilly Singh in a guest appearance in the song "Mauj Ki Malhare“

== Production ==
"Actually, there were two reasons to cast Juhi Chawla for the film. The very first thing is that it was a creative decision taken by all of us... and we thought it would be great to see two iconic stars Madhuri and Juhi together in the film." - Anubhav Sinha

As the film is based on the rural parts of India, many cast members would be portraying de-glamorous roles. Initially, actress Tabu was approached to play the lead, but due to a lack of funds filming could not be started. In April 2012, Soumik Sen approached Madhuri Dixit about the film. Later, Dixit officially announced her part in the film through her Facebook page. Tabu was then approached to play the second lead role, which she in turn declined; the role eventually went to Juhi Chawla, making Gulaab Gang the first time former rivals Chawla and Dixit have been on screen together. In December 2012, Tannishtha Chatterjee, Divya Jagdale, and Priyanka Bose signed on to play members of the gang.

== Filming ==
Shooting started in October 2012. Initially, it was reported that the movie was based on Sampat Pal Devi's life as head of the Gulabi Gang, but the director refused to confirm the rumor, stating that while he respected her work but the movie was not based on her. The first schedule of the film, involving Dixit, started in December 2012 and wrapped in January 2013. Dixit reported that the first schedule ended with a "high-energy song" choreographed by Saroj Khan. Dixit also trained with martial arts expert Shifu Kanishka Sharma in martial art forms like Shaolin Kung Fu, Pekiti-Tirsia Kali and Shaolin Chin Na for the movie. In December 2012, Juhi Chawla joined the shoot at Kamalistan Studios, Mumbai. This was Chawla's first role with the negative shades.

== Music ==
Gulaab Gang

Soundtrack album by Soumik Sen
- Released: 25 January 2014
- Genre: Film soundtrack
- Length: 33:42
- Label: T-Series
External audio
- Audio Jukebox on YouTube

The first track, titled Dheemi Dheemi, was released as a single on 18 January 2014. On 25 January 2014, the Gulaab Gang soundtrack was released in Varanasi when more than 18 thousand people witnessed it. The album has seven tracks composed by Soumik Sen and Sadhu Sushil Tiwari. The song Gulaabi was released in January 2014 and was a chartbuster. Another song, "Mauj Ki Malaharein," was released on 28 February 2014 and became very popular. It is sung by Sadhu Sushil Tiwari, Superwoman & Chaittali Shrivasttava.

=== Track listing ===
| No. | Title | Lyrics | Singer(s) | Length |
|---|---|---|---|---|
| 1. | "Gulaabi" | Neha Saraf | Malabika Brahma & Shilpa Rao | 5:23 |
| 2. | "Dheemi Dheemi Si" | Neha Saraf | Kaushiki Chakrabarty, Malabika Brahma | 5:08 |
| 3. | "Sharm Laaj" | Shreya Narayan | Malabika Brahma, Pawni Pandey | 4:16 |
| 4. | "Ankhiyaan" | Neha Saraf | Kaushiki Chakrabarty | 4:25 |
| 5. | "Rang Si Hui" | Neha Saraf | Kaushiki Chakrabarty | 4:57 |
| 6. | "Rangi Saari Gulaabi" | Traditional | Snehlata Dixit, Madhuri Dixit | 4:03 |
| 7. | "Teri Jai Ho" | Soumik Sen | Soumik Sen | 5:25 |
| 8. | "Mauj Ki Malhare" | Rohit Sharma | Sadhu Sushil Tiwari, Lilly Singh, Chaittali Shrivasttava | 5:15 |

== Controversy ==
Days before the movie's release, Sampat Pal Devi, the leader of the original Gulabi Gang, filed a case against the makers of movie, as she felt the filmmakers had no right to make a film on her life without her permission. On 5 March 2014, the Delhi High Court passed a stay order against the release of the film throughout India stating that the release would cause irreparable loss to Pal's reputation and that "the loss of reputation can not be compensated by monetary terms". The high court lifted the stay one day later.

== Box office ==
Gulaab Gang was released on around 1,700 screens. It earned ₹9.31 crore in its first weekend. The film collected ₹ 2.41 crore at the box office its first day, which was considered a poor start given its budget of ₹ 25 Crores and screen count of 1,700. The producers announced the film a flop.

== Awards and nominations ==
| Year | Award | Category | Recipients | Result |
|---|---|---|---|---|
| 2015 | 60th Filmfare Awards | Best Supporting Actress | Juhi Chawla | Nominated |
| 2015 | 16th IIFA Awards | Best Supporting Actress | Juhi Chawla | Nominated |
| 2015 | 21st Screen Awards | Best Actress in a Negative Role | Juhi Chawla | Nominated |
| 2015 | 7th Mirchi Music Awards | Raag-Inspired Song of the Year | "Aankhiyaan" | Nominated |
