= Bhairon Prasad Mishra =

Indian politician

Member of the India Parliament for Banda
- In office 1 September 2014 – 23 May 2019
- Preceded by: R. K. Singh Patel
- Succeeded by: R. K. Singh Patel
- Constituency: Banda

Personal details
- Born: 7 September 1958 (age 67) Hanuva, Uttar Pradesh, India
- Party: Bharatiya Janata Party
- Spouse: Chinta Devi Mishra
- Children: 4
- Parent(s): Late Shri Raja Bhai Mishra & Sonia Devi Mishra
- Occupation: Agriculturist

Bhairon Prasad Mishra is a member of the Bharatiya Janata Party and has won the 2014 Indian general elections from the Banda (Lok Sabha constituency). He has had a 100% attendance record in parliament with significantly higher than average participation – he has been a part of 2,095 debates while the national average for the same is 67.1.

Bhairon Prasad Mishra was born on 7 September 1958. His birthplace is Hanuva, Chitrakoot District, (Uttar Pradesh).
