= Ram Sajeevan =

Indian politician (1929–2008)

Ram Sajeevan (2 January 1929 – 2008) was an Indian politician]of the Bahujan Samaj Party. He was a member of the Uttar Pradesh Legislative Assembly four times between 1969 and 1989 as a member of the Communist Party of India. He was elected 9th Lok Sabha from Banda as a Communist Party of India politician, but in 1996 he left the Communist Party of India and joined the Bahujan Samaj Party. He later was elected to the Banda constituency in the 1996 and 1999 Lok Sabha elections. Sajeevan was born in Sonepur, Banda district, Uttar Pradesh, British India on 2 January 1929. He died in 2008.
