= Naraini =

- Town
- Naraini
- Location in Uttar Pradesh, India Naraini (India)
- Coordinates: 25°11′N 80°29′E
- Country: India
- State: Uttar Pradesh
- District: Banda

Population (2011)
  - Total: 13,400

Language
  - Official: Hindi
  - Additional official: Urdu
- Time zone: UTC+5:30 (IST)
- Postal code: 210129
- Telephone code: 05191
- Vehicle registration: UP-90
- Website: up.gov.in

Naraini is a town and Nagar panchayat in Banda district in the Indian state of Uttar Pradesh. It is one of the four tehsils of Banda District.

It lies in the region of Bundelkhand, in the extreme south of Uttar Pradesh. It is about 619 kilometres south east from New Delhi and 234 kilometres south from Lucknow

== Demographics ==
As of 2011 Indian Census, Naraini had a total population of 13,400, of which 7,218 were males and 6,182 were females. Population within the age group of 0 to 6 years was 1,876. The total number of literates in Naraini was 8,866, which constituted 66.2% of the population with male literacy of 73.8% and female literacy of 57.2%. The effective literacy rate of 7+ population of Naraini was 76.9%, of which male literacy rate was 85.4% and female literacy rate was 66.9%. The Scheduled Castes population was 2,757. Naraini had 2505 households in 2011.

As of 2001 Indian census, Naraini town had a total population of 13,124, with 7,046 males and 6,078 females. Population in the age groups of 0 to 6 years was 2,416. The total number of literates in 2001 was 7,419, which constituted 56.5% of the total population. The effective literacy of 7+ population was 69.3.

== Places ==
Naraini has various religious and popular places.

- Hanuman (हनुमान) temple in Gurha kalan is approx 8 kilometers away from Naraini.
- Kalinjar Fort (कालिंजर दुर्ग) is famed for its war history & glorious rock sculptures is situated 20 kilometers south from Naraini. The fortress is strategically located on an isolated rocky hill at the end the Vindhya Range, at an elevation of 1,203 feet (367 m) and overlooks the plains of Bundelkhand. It served several of Bundelkhand's ruling dynasties, including the Chandela dynasty of Rajputs in the 10th century, and the Solankis of Rewa. The fortress contains several temples dating as far back as the Gupta dynasty of the 3rd-5th centuries.
- Rangarh (रनगढ़) fort is one of the oldest fort situated near Pangara between the Ken River.

== Transport Links ==
Air

The nearest airport is at Khajuraho, 110 kilometres (68 mi) away.

Rail

The nearest railway station is at Atarra 15 kilometres (9.3 mi) away. another one railway station is Banda 35 kilometres (22 mi) away.

Road

It's Approx 35 kilometers away from Banda, Uttar Pradesh, and approx 100 kilometers away from Satna, Madhya Pradesh by road.

== Geography and climate ==
Naraini is located at 25.11N 89.29E. Naraini lies on the plateau of central India, an area dominated by rocky relief and minerals underneath the soil. The city has a natural slope in the north as it is on the southern area of the Vindhyachal mountains ranges of Madhya Pradesh.

=== Climate ===
Being on a rocky plateau, Naraini experiences extreme temperatures. Winter begins in October with the retreat of the Southwest Monsoon and peaks in mid-December. The mercury generally reads about 4 degrees minimum and 21 degrees maximum. Spring arrives by the end of February and is a short-lived phase of transition. Summer begins by April and summer temperatures can peak at 47 degrees in May. The rainy season starts by the third week of June (although this is variable year to year). Monsoon rains gradually weaken in September and the season ends by the last week of September. In the rainy season, the average daily high temperature hovers around 36 degrees Celsius with high humidity.

== Member of legislative assembly ==
- 2017- Naraini SC- Raj Karan Kabir
- 2012- Naraini SC- Gayacharan Dinkar
- 2007- Naraini GEN- Purushottam Naresh
- 2002- Naraini GEN- Dr. Surendra Pal Verma
- 1996- Naraini GEN- Babu Lal Kushvaha
- 1993- Naraini GEN- Surendra Pal Verma
- 1991- Naraini GEN- Ramesh Chandra Dwivedi
- 1989- Naraini GEN- Surender Pal Verma
- 1985- Naraini GEN- Shrender Pal Verma
- 1980- Naraini GEN- Harbansh Prasad Pandey
- 1977- Naraini GEN- Surendra Pal
- 1974- Naraini GEN- Chandrabhan Azad
- 1969- Naraini GEN- Harbansh Prasad
- 1967- Naraini GEN- J.Singh
- 1962- Naraini GEN- Matola Singh
- 1957- Naraini GEN- Gopi Krishna Azad
- 1951- Naraini GEN- Shyama Charan
