= Sampat Pal Devi =

Indian activist

Sampat Pal Devi is an Indian social activist from the Bundelkhand region of Uttar Pradesh, North India. She is founder of the Gulabi Gang, an Uttar Pradesh-based social organisation, works for women welfare and empowerment. She was participant of Colors TV's reality show Bigg Boss 6.

== Background ==
Sampat Pal Devi founded the Gulabi Gang to further the cause of women's rights. It developed into an organised women's movement with as many as 270,000 members spread over several districts in Uttar Pradesh. The women wear Gulabi (pink) saris and arm themselves with bamboo sticks, which they use whenever they come up against violent resistance.

Pal described her early life in an autobiography written with the collaboration of the French journalist Anne Berthod. According to a BBC report, Banda district is a “highly caste-ridden, feudalistic and male dominated society. Dowry demands and domestic and sexual violence are common. Locals say it is not surprising that a women's vigilante group has sprung up in this landscape of poverty, discrimination and chauvinism“.

On 2 March 2014, Pal was relieved of her role at the head of the Gulabi Gang amid allegations of financial impropriety and putting her personal interests ahead of those of the group.

== Early life ==
Born to a Gaderiya (Shepherd community), Sampat Pal Devi did not have a formal education and to worked in agricultural fields and farmland as a child, but was self-taught in reading and writing. She was eventually enrolled in school for several years, but she was ultimately forced to forego her education when she was married off at twelve. Pal Devi birthed five children by the age of fifteen.

== Leadership of the Gulabi Gang ==
One day, in a Northern Indian village, Sampat Pal Devi witnessed a husband ruthlessly beating his wife. She appealed for the abuser to stop, but he continued and enacted violence on Pal Devi. The following day, Pal Devi returned along with five others holding bamboo sticks and they thrashed him. This event spread around the community and many women approached Pal Devi to intervene in their own oppressive relationships and countless women joined her in combating the violence against women in the Banda district. Due to witnessing ongoing incidents involving domestic violence as well as sexual oppression against women in the Banda District within Uttar Pradesh India, Sampat Pal Devi formally created the Gulabi Gang in January 2006. Within the gang, she assumed the role of leader. The word "gulabi" translates to pink in Hindi. Pal Devi and other founding members believed that villages in India failed to educate them and coerced them into marrying young in oppressive marriages and family dynamics. Since the women in India's subcontinent are socioeconomically poor and devoid of resources, they became known as the “untouchable” caste, where they face discrimination and oppression. Also regarded as "Dalits", these women are regarded as the lowest stratum among the caste system in India. This classification has subsequently led to immense political oppression of the Dalits, which the gang seeks to address.

Under Pal Devi's leadership, the Gulabi Gang participated in non-violent and violent resistance. Hoping to raise more awareness about the oppression women within the district faced, they actively protested around government buildings. In one instance, the Gulabi Gang showed up at a police station with pink dogs to humiliate the police and to communicate to them that the dogs were on their side more than the police. Within an additional protest in 2008, members circled a Banda district office of electricity, where the village's power was cut off in exchange for bribes. As a response, they decided to lock the officials within the building's apparatus and contended that the lock would be detached only if they reinstated the district's electricity, and after one hour, the electricity was restored. On the matter of the gang's violent interventions, they utilized violence toward district and village officials. In one instance, the Gulabi Gang petitioned for a deteriorated road to be fixed, but an official spewed personal insults toward Pal Devi instead. As a result, they all overthrew him and he ultimately went on to greenlight the construction of a new road. Regarding their interventions in domestic violence against women, they first aim to reason nonviolently with the husband, but if he fails to stop the abuse against his wife, then the gang and the wife both beat him up. Pal Devi believed that women should fight back against oppressive men by standing firm against those who abused or abandoned their wives. Sampat Pal Devi once stated that the Gulabi Gang has a 100 percent rate of justice towards grievances of domestic violence. In doing so, they learned how to defend themselves with a long Indian stick made of bamboo called a lathi. She once stated "Yes, we fight rapists with lathis [large bamboo sticks]. If we find the culprit, we thrash him black and blue so he dare not attempt to do wrong to any girl or a woman again." The Gulabi Gang only utilized violent methods in self-defense or as a last-ditch effort to combat oppression.

=== Utilization of Pink Saris ===
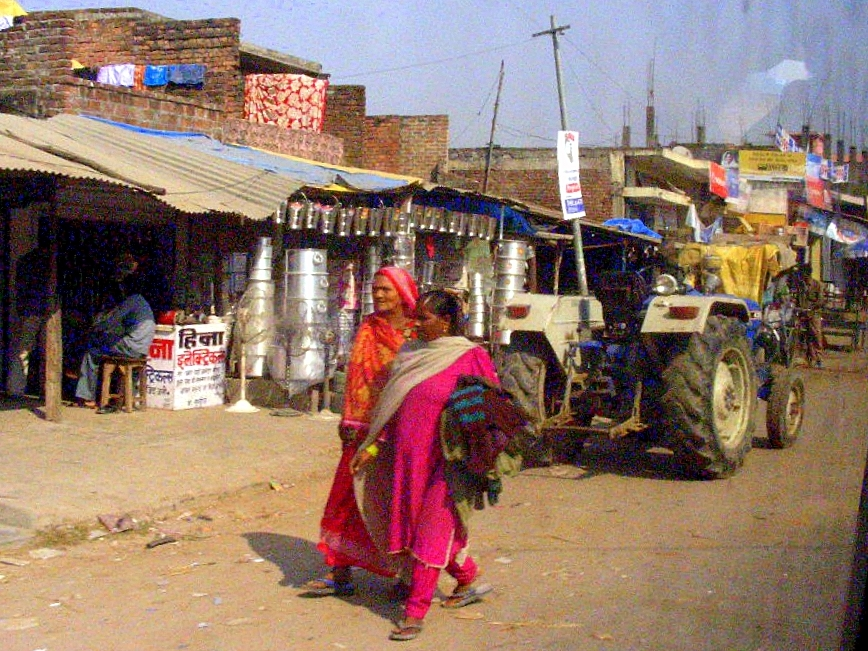
Two women walking in their village while wearing pink saris.

Sampat Pal Devi and the Gulabi Gang utilize and represent the color pink in their choice of clothing. Pal Devi and her fellow members contend that the pink sari directs respect for them within their communities. Linguistically, pink is representative of the word "gulabi", as its dictionary definition translates to a rosy color or pink in Hindi. The pink saris empowered and bonded the members of the gang because while wearing the pink sari is not mandatory, Pal Devi believed that it established a feeling of community for women within India. Pink was also chosen because it contained no political or religious connections in Indian society.

=== Awards and achievements ===
The Gulabi Gang was awarded the Godfrey Phillips Bravery Awards for community efforts against dowry, child labor, corruption, and drug abuse. They also earned the Kelvinator 11th GR8! Women Awards for their contributions to their field and the Nari Shakti Samman by the Ministry of Women and Child Development of the Government.

== Gulabi Gang scandal ==
In early 2014, four days before a film based on the Gulabi Gang was to be released, Sampat Pal Devi was ousted from her leadership position in the Gulabi Gang. This action was done based on accusations against Devi which included the misuse of money, Devi’s pursuit of her career in politics to the disservice of the Gulabi Gang, and her authoritarian nature. Members of the Gulabi Gang believed that Devi had turned the group into a political organization rather than a social group. Jai Prakash Shivhare, the National Convenor for the Gulabi gang, stated that Devi had begun to wander from the group’s goals, that she had become obsessed with publicity, and that she had forgotten the purpose of its creation in 2006. Shivhare’s evidence for this included Devi contesting the 2012 Assembly Elections without notifying members of the Gulabi Gang, participating in the “Big Boss” show on her own, and pressuring group members to campaign for her run for Congress. There had also been unproven claims that Devi had taken money from donations made to the group and that she was in cahoots with the makers of the “Gulabi Gang” film because, unlike other group members, she hadn’t made an effort to request compensation from the filmmakers for the creation of the film. Later in 2014, Devi was involved in a physical altercation with her former aides, Jaiprakash Shivhare and Mitthu Devi. Pal Devi alleged that they attacked her but later reports alleged that she had physically retaliated as well. The police official who came to the scene reported that both sides had filed complaints against one another. It is widely believed that this particular altercation was a result of Pal Devi and Shivhare’s resentment towards one another, as Shivhare led the meeting that ultimately ousted Pal Devi. Suman Singh Chauhan, the assistant commander of the Gulabi Gang, was elected as the new leader.

== Community contributions and media appearances ==
Several years after forming the Gulabi Gang, in 2008, Sampat Pal Devi created a school for children. Due to her belief in the crucial nature of education for young girls, most students, 400 out of the 600 attendees, were female. In her view, girls were historically subject to working in the fields and her school changed that, as she believed that education was important in shifting societal norms in India. Pal Devi once stated "People, especially those belonging to the extremely poor and marginalized castes, do not educate their girls. For most, sending girls to a school is a problem of affordability."

Women's financial liberty and security have been promoted by the Gulabi Gang, as they have instituted many small businesses where original and homespun products are crafted. The products that these women make include pickles, candles, and alternative medicines known as Ayurvedic medicine.

A documentary was released in 2012 called Gulabi Gang, which displays the everyday conflicts and complexities that Pal Devi and these women face in India. Notions of resistance, gender equality, and the overall landscape of gender relations in India are explored in the film. At the heart of the film is her and the Gulabi Gang's relentless pursuit of their goals. After viewing the film, Pal Devi was unhappy with the portrayal of the Gulabi Gang members as individuals bearing arms and instead contended that in their activities, the members only utilize lathis; bamboo sticks.

Pal Devi made an additional media appearance in the Indian television reality series, Big Boss, where she participated with the principal aim of utilizing the large-scale platform to advance her core ideals and points of contact on the matter of women’s rights. She additionally desired to generate an understanding among the viewership through her leadership voice.

== Political efforts ==
In 2010, four years after the gang's inception, 21 members were elected in the local government for panchayat representation. This position allows for the supervision of community matters, including road constriction and clean water. Pal Devi ran as a Congressional candidate several times. In 2007, she failed to win a seat as an independent candidate within the Naraini electorate. After several additional failed attempts throughout the subsequent decade, Pal Devi ran again in 2022, and faced with a denial of her candidacy ticket for the subsequent elections, she withdrew from her Congressional candidacy.

== Television ==
Year	Name	Role	Channel	Notes	Ref
2012	Bigg Boss 6	Contestant	Colors TV	Entered Day 1, Evicted 34	
