= Manikpur Assembly constituency =

Constituency of the Uttar Pradesh legislative assembly in India

Coordinates: 25.07°N 81.10°E

Manikpur
- Constituency No. 237 for the Uttar Pradesh Legislative Assembly

Constituency details
- Country: India
- Region: North India
- State: Uttar Pradesh
- District: Chitrakoot
- Lok Sabha constituency: Banda
- Total electors: 3,38,989
- Reservation: None

Member of Legislative Assembly
- 18th Uttar Pradesh Legislative Assembly
- Incumbent Avinash Chandra Dwivedi
- Party: AD(S)
- Alliance: NDA
- Elected year: 2022
- Preceded by: Aanand Shukla

Manikpur is a constituency of the Uttar Pradesh Legislative Assembly covering the Manikpur Sarhat town in the Chitrakoot district of Uttar Pradesh, India.

Manikpur is one of five assembly constituencies in the Banda Lok Sabha constituency. Since 2008, this assembly constituency is numbered 237 amongst 403 constituencies. Until 2008 this constituency was reserved for Scheduled Castes.

== List of MLAs ==
Year	Member	Party
1962	Sia Dulari	Indian National Congress
1967	Indra Pal	Bharatiya Jana Sangh
1969	Sia Dulari	Indian National Congress
1974	Laxmi Prasad	Bharatiya Jana Sangh
1977	Ramesh Chand	Janata Party
1980	Shiromani Bhai	Indian National Congress (Indira)
1985	Shiromani Bhai	Indian National Congress
1989	Sia Dulari	Indian National Congress
1991	Mannu Lal Kuril	Bharatiya Janata Party
1993	Mannu Lal Kuril	Bharatiya Janata Party
1996	Daddu Prasad	Bahujan Samaj Party
2002	Daddu Prasad	Bahujan Samaj Party
2007	Daddu Prasad	Bahujan Samaj Party
2012	Chandrabhan Singh Patel	Bahujan Samaj Party
2017	R. K. Singh Patel	Bharatiya Janata Party
2019^	Aanand Shukla	Bharatiya Janata Party
2022	Avinash Chandra Dwivedi	Apna Dal (Sonelal)

^ bypoll

== Election results ==
=== 2027 ===
2027 Uttar Pradesh Legislative Assembly election: Manikpur
Party	Candidate	Votes	%	±%
INDIA				
NDA				
BSP				
NOTA	None of the above			
Majority				
Turnout				
gain from		Swing		

=== 2022 ===
2022 Uttar Pradesh Legislative Assembly election: Manikpur
Party	Candidate	Votes	%	±%
AD(S)	Avinash Chandra Dwivedi	73,132	35.17	
SP	Veer Singh Patel	72,084	34.67	▲4.49
BSP	Balveer Pal	45,367	21.82	▲0.20
INC	Ranjana Barati Lal Pandey	4,110	1.98	▼2.67
Jan Adhikar Party	Shivpoojan	2,849	1.37	
AAP	Avinash Chandra Tripathi	2,054	0.99	
NOTA	None of the above	3,325	1.6	▼0.15
Majority		1,048	0.5	▼6.75
Turnout		207,930	61.34	▲9.00

=== 2019 bypoll ===
By-election, 2019: Manikpur
Party	Candidate	Votes	%	±%
BJP	Aanand Shukla	66,310	37.43	▼6.25
SP	Nirbhay Singh Patel	53,470	30.18	
BSP	Ramnarayan Kol	38,296	21.62	▲4.92
INC	Priyadarshan Tiwari	8,233	4.65	▼16.18
CPI	Jagdish Singh	2,531	1.43	
Annadata Party	Shanti Singh	1,677	0.95	
NOTA	None of the above	3,096	1.75	▼0.22
Majority		12,840	7.25	▼15.60
Turnout		177,166	52.34	▼7.40
BJP hold		Swing		

=== 2017 ===
R. K. Singh Patel won in last Assembly election of 2017 Uttar Pradesh Legislative Elections defeating Indian National Congress and Samajwadi Party candidate Sampat Pal by a margin of 44,464 votes.

2017 Uttar Pradesh Legislative Assembly Election: Manikpur
Party	Candidate	Votes	%	±%
BJP	R. K. Singh Patel	84,988	43.68	
INC	Sampat Pal	40,524	20.83	
BSP	Chandrabhan Singh Patel	32,498	16.7	
BMP	Daddu Prasad	9,697	4.98	
NISHAD	Sukhlal Nishad	5,329	2.74	
RLD	Dinesh Prasad	4,611	2.37	
Rashtriya Aam Jan Seva Party	Akhilesh Kumar	2,203	1.13	
Independent	Ramdayal	2,102	1.08	
Independent	Sheikh Khudabaksh	1,959	1.01	
Independent	Satyadev	1,848	0.95	
NOTA	None of the above	3,752	1.97	
Majority		44,464	22.85	
Turnout		194,557	59.74	
