= Sari Squad =

The Sari Squad refers to a group of women which were largely of South Asian descent who fought against racist attacks and anti-immigration policies in London, England in the early 1980s.

== History ==
The name "sari" refers to the well-known South Asian female garment. British media used the appellation "Sari Squad" to denote the group of activists. Most members were South Asian women who would resist and confront racist attacks against immigrants and foreigners in Britain. British Jamaican writer, dub poet and Rastafarian Benjamin Zephaniah described the group of women as

experts in various martial arts and ready and willing to take on any racists who would try to spoil our fun. They fought with style, and would usually burst into song after seeing off any attackers.

In April 1984, the Sari Squad actively supported a young Bangladeshi widow, Afia Begum, and her child who were being deported by raising public awareness of the case and taking it to the European Commission of Human Rights. In the same year, and before the commission could rule, the UK Government arrested Afia in a dawn raid and summarily deported her.

Her deportation was described by the European Parliament as "callous and showing the racist and sexist nature of the United Kingdom immigration laws." The Sari Squad was afterwards praised in the House of Commons by Harry Cohen MP, and criticised by Home Secretary David Waddington.

In the 21st century, groups of activist women have been called by the media "Sari Squads," such as the Bangladeshi villagers who are protecting the Chunati Wildlife Sanctuary.

== Popular culture ==
Sari Squad were featured during the "HerStory" video tribute to notable women on U2's tour in 2017 for the 30th anniversary of The Joshua Tree during a performance of "Ultraviolet (Light My Way)" from the band's 1991 album Achtung Baby.

== See also ==
- Gulabi Gang
