= Raj Karan Kabir =

Indian politician

MLA, 17th Legislative Assembly
- Incumbent
- Assumed office March 2017
- Constituency: Naraini (Assembly constituency)

Personal details
- Party: Bharatiya Janata Party
- Occupation: MLA
- Profession: Politician

Raj Karan Kabir is an Indian politician and a member of 17th Legislative Assembly, Uttar Pradesh of India. He represents the Naraini (Assembly constituency) in Banda district of Uttar Pradesh. Raj Karan Kabir belong to the Koli caste of Uttar Pradesh.

== Political career ==
Raj Karan Kabir contested Uttar Pradesh Assembly Election as Bharatiya Janata Party candidate and defeated his close contestant Bharat Lal Diwakar from Indian National Congress with a margin of 45,007 votes.

== Posts held ==
#	From	To	Position	Comments
01	March 2017	Incumbent	Member, 17th Legislative Assembly	
