= Krishna Devi Shivshanker Patel =

Indian politician

Krishna Devi Shivshanker

Member of Parliament
- In office 2024 - Present
- Preceded by: R. K. Singh Patel
- Constituency: Banda

Personal details
- Born: 1 June 1971 (age 55) Samsuddinpur, Uttar Pradesh, India
- Party: Samajwadi Party
- Other political affiliations: Bharatiya Janata Party
- Spouse: Shivshankar Singh Patel (M.1 May 1984)
- Children: 1 Son
- Parent(s): Jagmohan Singh, Tulsa Devi

Krishna Devi Shivshanker is an Indian politician. She is a member of Samajwadi Party.

== Political career ==
Shivshanker has been elected as a Member of Parliament from Banda Lok Sabha Constituency. She defeated R.K. Singh Patel of BJP by a margin of 71210 votes.
