= Jageshwar Yadav =

Indian politician

Member of the Lok Sabha
- In office 1967–1971
- Constituency: Banda

Personal details
- Born: 11 July 1917
- Party: Communist Party of India
- Other political affiliations: Indian National Congress, Praja Socialist Party

Jageshwar Yadav (born 11 July 1917) was an Indian politician and leader of Communist Party of India. He represented Banda Lok Sabha constituency from 1967 to 1971.

Yadav was previously associated with the Indian National Congress and the Praja Socialist Party; took part in the 1942 movement and suffered rigorous imprisonment for two years with, five; took part in the food agitation launched by the P.S.P. in 1957 and jailed for 14 days; Gen. Secretary, Maval Congress Committee, Baberu, 1947–48; Member, D.C.C., 1947; Secretary, Junior High School, Patwan, Banda; Manager, Yadav Ashram, Akshabat, Chitrakoot, District Satna; Auditor, Shri Krishna Junior High School, Punahur, District Banda; Convener, Kisan Mazdoor Sammelan, District Banda.
