= Mandwal =

Village in Haryana, India

Coordinates: 33°03′N 74°27′E

Mandwal is a village in Bilaspur tehsil, Banda district, Azimgarh, Haryana in India.

== Soomra sainswal Sardars ==
- 1026 – 1053: Soomar bin Rao Soomar Parmar
- 1053 – 1068: Bhungar I bin Khafif I Soomro
- 1068 – 1092: Dodo I bin Bhungar Soomro
- 1092 – 1098: Zenav Tari Sultana bint Dodo I Soomro (d/o Sardar Dodo I)
- 1098 – 1107: Sanghar bin Dodo I Soomro
- 1107 – 1107 : Hamun Sultana (w/o Sardar Sanghar)
- 1107 – 1142: Khafif II bin Soomar bin Dodo I Soomro
- 1142 – 1181: Umar I bin Soomar bin Dodo I Soomro
- 1181 – 1195: Dodo II Bin Khafif II Soomro
- 1195 – 1222: Bhungar II bin Chanesar bin Hamir bin Dodo I Soomro
- 1222 – 1228: Chanesar I bin Bhungar II Soomro (first reign)
- 1228 – 1236: Ganhwar I bin Bhungar II Soomro (first reign)
- 1236 – 1237: Chanesar I bin Bhungar II Soomro (second reign)
- 1237 – 1241: Ganhwar I bin Bhungar II Soomro (second reign)
- 1241 – 1256: Muhammad Tur bin Ganhwar I Soomro
- 1256 – 1259: Ganhwar II bin Muhammad Tur Soomro
- 1259 – 1273: Dodo III bin Ganhwar II Soomro
- 1273 – 1283: Tai bin Dodo III Soomro
- 1283 – 1300: Chanesar II bin Dodo III Soomro
- 1300 – 1315: Bhungar III bin Chanesar II Soomro
- 1315 – 1333: Khafif III bin Chanesar II Soomro
- 1333 – 1350: Dodo IV bin Khafif III Soomro
- 1333 – 1350: Umar II bin Khafif III Soomro
- 1333 – 1350: Bhungar IV bin Khafif III Soomro
- 1333 – 1356: Hamir bin Dodo IV Soomro

== Soomra Sardars of Umerkot Sindh ==
- 1356 – 1390: Umar III bin Hamir Soomro
