= Ommani Verma =

Indian politician

Ommani Pawanji Verma

Member of legislative assembly, Naraini
- Incumbent
- Assumed office 2022
- Constituency: Naraini

Personal details
- Born: Ommani Verma; 1985 (age 40–41) Uttar Pradesh, India
- Party: Bhartiya Janata Party
- Spouse: Pawan Kumarji Verma
- Profession: Social worker
- Nickname: Vermaji

Ommani Pawan Verma is an Indian politician, social worker, current Member of legislative assembly for Naraini constituency of Uttar Pradesh and member of Bhartiya Janata Party. She defeated the Kiran Verma of Samajwadi Party in 2022 Uttar Pradesh Legislative Assembly election by a big margin of votes. Verma belongs to the Koli caste of Uttar Pradesh.
