= Barehta =

Village in Uttar Pradesh, India

Coordinates: 22°54′N 79°24′E

Barehta is a village in Garwara, Uttar Pradesh, India.
