= Nishtha Jain =

Indian film director and producer

Nishtha Jain is an Indian film director and producer best known for her documentaries like Gulabi Gang (2012), Lakshmi and Me (2007) and City of Photos (2004). Her films interrogate lived experience at the intersection of gender, caste and class. They explore the political in the personal and uncover the mechanisms of privilege. In addition to documentary film, she's been working across various platforms including narrative (Saboot/Proof (2019) and virtual reality (Submerged 2016).

Her training began at A.J.K. Mass Communication Research Centre at Jamia Millia Islamia, New Delhi. She then worked as an editor and correspondent for video news magazines Newstrack and Eyewitness. After this, she studied at Film and Television Institute of India, specializing in film direction.

Jain has served as a juror at IDFA, ZFF, Cinéma Vérité and IDSFFK. She's given lectures and master classes at numerous universities internationally, including Stanford, NYU, Wellesley College, UCSB, Northwestern University, UT Austin, Cambridge University, University of London, St. Andrews University, Heidelberg, Danish Film School, FTII Pune, India, Satyajit Ray Film & TV Institute.

Her films have received several international awards and have been extensively shown in international film festivals, broadcast on international TV networks and regularly shown in schools and colleges in India and abroad. She's a Chicken & Egg Award winner (2020); Member of the Academy of Motion Pictures and Sciences (AMPAS); Film Independent Global Media Maker Fellow (2019–20); and recipient of Fulbright-Nehru Academic and Professional Excellence Fellowship (2019).

== Filmography ==
- City of Photos (60 min. 2004)
- Call it Slut (14 min. 2005)
- 6 Yards to Democracy (66 min. 2007) directed by Nishtha Jain, Co-director Smriti Nevatia
- Lakshmi and Me (59 min. 2007)
- At My Doorstep (70 min. 2009)
- Family Album (60 min. 2010)
- Gulabi Gang (96 min. 2012)
- Submerged (8 min. V.R. 2016)
- Saboot/Proof (21 min. 2019) directed by Nishtha Jain and Deepti Gupta
- The Golden thread (91 min. 2022)
- Farming the Revolution (105 min., 2024)
