= R. K. Singh Patel =

Member of Parliament in Uttar Pradesh, India

- Member Of Parliament

Member of Parliament, Lok Sabha
- In office 23 May 2019 – 4 June 2024
- Preceded by: Bhairon Prasad Mishra
- Succeeded by: Krishna Devi Shivshanker Patel
- Constituency: Banda

Member of Legislative Assembly
- In office March 2017 – May 2019
- Preceded by: Chandra Bhan
- Constituency: Manikpur

Member of Parliament, Lok Sabha
- In office 2009–2014
- Preceded by: Shyama Charan Gupta
- Succeeded by: Bhairon Prasad Mishra
- Constituency: Banda, (Uttar Pradesh)

Personal details
- Born: 3 July 1959 (age 67) Balapur, Khalsa, Chitrakoot, Uttar Pradesh, India
- Citizenship: Indian
- Party: Bharatiya Janata Party(BJP)
- Spouse: Shanti Devi Patel.
- Children: 03 sons & 01 daughter & 01 Grandson Shaurya singh patel
- Parent(s): Bhagwan Deen Singh, Ram Sakhi Devi
- Education: University of Allahabad, Uttar Pradesh
- Occupation: Agriculturist & Politician
- Committees: Health and Family Welfare (Member) Railway Convention (Member)

Ramkripal Singh Patel is a member of the 17th Lok Sabha. He represents the Banda constituency of Uttar Pradesh and is a member of the Bhartiya Janta Party (BJP). Before this he was also the member of 15th Lok Sabha of India. He represented the Banda constituency of India and was a member of the Samajwadi Party (SP). His son Sunil Patel is also a BJP leader.

== Education and background ==
Patel holds B.A. degree from University of Allahabad, Uttar Pradesh. He was an agriculturist by profession before joining politics.

== Posts held ==
#	From	To	Position
01	1996	2007	Member, Uttar Pradesh Legislative Assembly (two terms) - Karwi
02	1996	1997	Minister of State, Government of Uttar Pradesh
03	2002	2003	Cabinet Minister, Government of Uttar Pradesh
04	2009	2014	Elected to 15th Lok Sabha
05	2009	2014	Member, Committee on Health and Family Welfare
06	2010	2014	Member, Committee on Railway Convention
07	2017	2019	Member, Uttar Pradesh Legislative Assembly from Manikpur
08	2019	2024	Elected to 17th Lok Sabha

== See also ==
- List of members of the 15th Lok Sabha of India
