= Prakash Dwivedi =

Indian politician

MLA, 17th Legislative Assembly
- Incumbent
- Assumed office 2017
- Constituency: Banda, Uttar Pradesh

Personal details
- Party: Bharatiya Janata Party
- Occupation: MLA
- Profession: Politician

Prakash Dwivedi is an Indian politician and a member of the 17th Uttar Pradesh Assembly, Uttar Pradesh of India. He represents the ‘Banda Sadar’ constituency in the Banda district of Uttar Pradesh.

== Political career ==
Prakash Dwivedi received 83,169 votes whereas Madhusudan Kushwaha received 50,341 votes. Vivek Kumar Singh, a member of the Indian National Congress received 32,223 votes and got third position in the Uttar Pradesh assembly elections 2017. A total of 165,733 voters have used their voting rights to cast their votes for Bharatiya Janata Party, Bahujan Samaj Party and Indian National Congress. Bharatiya Janata Party is the winner by 32,828 votes in the UP assembly elections 2017 from the seat of Uttar Pradesh.

Prakash Dwivedi contested Uttar Pradesh Assembly Election as a Bharatiya Janata Party candidate and defeated his close contestant Madhusudan Kushwaha from Bahujan Samaj Party with a margin of 32,828 votes.

During the 2017 Assembly Election, former Congress Minister Vivek Kumar Singh (who had been an opponent of Prakash Dwivedi from Banda Assembly Constituency) had also filed a petition in the Allahabad High Court and claimed that he had deliberately hidden some of his criminal cases in the affidavit submitted with his Election nomination papers. The High Court had also issued notice to him in this regard.

== Controversy ==
On 23 June 2025, Dwivedi allegedly assaulted SDM Amit Shukla in Banda after Shukla seized two overloaded trucks carrying illegal gravel near Khurhand police post. Reports claim Dwivedi slapped Shukla and his supporters attacked police, sparking political controversy. Dwivedi denied physical assault, admitting only to scolding Shukla over vehicle seizures. An FIR was filed against four named individuals and 25-30 unidentified assailants, but Dwivedi was not named. Opposition parties, including SP and Congress, criticised the BJP.

== Posts held ==
| # | From | To | Position | Comments |
|---|---|---|---|---|
| 01 | 2017 | Incumbent | Member, 17th Legislative Assembly | |
| 02 | | Incumbent | Chairman, UPUSSL | |
