= Naraini Assembly constituency =

Constituency of the Uttar Pradesh legislative assembly in India

Coordinates: 25.19°N 80.47°E

Naraini
- Constituency No. 234 for the Uttar Pradesh Legislative Assembly

Constituency details
- Country: India
- Region: North India
- State: Uttar Pradesh
- District: Banda
- Total electors: 3,42,361
- Reservation: SC

Member of Legislative Assembly
- 18th Uttar Pradesh Legislative Assembly
- Incumbent Ommani Verma
- Party: Bharatiya Janta Party
- Elected year: 2017

Naraini is a constituency of the Uttar Pradesh Legislative Assembly covering the city of Naraini in the Banda district of Uttar Pradesh, India.

Naraini is one of five assembly constituencies in the Banda Lok Sabha constituency. Since 2008, this assembly constituency is numbered 234 amongst 403 constituencies.

== Members of the Legislative Assembly ==
Election	Name	Party
2012	Gaya Charan Dinkar	Bahujan Samaj Party
2017	Raj Karan Kabir	Bharatiya Janata Party
2022	Ommani Verma	Bharatiya Janata Party

== Election results ==
=== 2027 ===
2027 Uttar Pradesh Legislative Assembly election: Naraini
Party	Candidate	Votes	%	±%
INDIA				
NDA				
BSP				
NOTA	None of the above			
Majority				
Turnout				
gain from		Swing		

=== 2022 ===
2022 Uttar Pradesh Legislative Assembly election: Safipur
Party	Candidate	Votes	%	±%
BJP	Ommani Verma	83,263	38.91	−6.39
SP	Kiran Verma	76,544	35.77	
BSP	Gayacharan Dinkar	36,871	17.23	−4.64
Jan Adhikar Party	Shankar Lal	6,558	3.06	
CPI	Dayaram	2,550	1.19	−0.45
NOTA	None of the above	3,420	1.6	−0.22
Majority		6,719	3.14	−18.92
Turnout		213,967	62.5	+1.75
BJP hold		Swing		

=== 2017 ===
Bharatiya Janta Party candidate Raj Karan Kabir won in 2017 Uttar Pradesh Legislative Elections defeating INC candidate Bharat Lal Diwakar by a margin of 45,007 votes.

2017 Uttar Pradesh Legislative Assembly Election: Narain
Party	Candidate	Votes	%	±%
BJP	Raj Karan Kabir	92,412	45.3	
INC	Bharat Lal Diwakar	47,405	23.24	
BSP	Gayacharan Dinkar	44,610	21.87	
CPI	Daya Ram	3,344	1.64	
Independent	Mata Prasad	2,442	1.2	
RLD	Rameshchandra Kuril	2,407	1.18	
Independent	Ramkripal	1,899	0.93	
NOTA	None of the above	3,655	1.82	
Majority		45,007	22.06	
Turnout		204,001	60.75	
