= Tindwari =

- Town
- Location in Uttar Pradesh, India Tindwari (India)
- Coordinates: 25.62°N 80.53°E
- Country: India
- State: Uttar Pradesh
- District: Banda

Government
  - Body: up govt
- Elevation plane: 114 m (374 ft)

Population (2001)
  - Total: 9,544

Languages
  - Official: Hindi
- Time zone: UTC+5:30 (IST)
- Postal code: 210128
- Vehicle registration: UP
- Website: www.tindwari.com
- more results of tindwari

Tindwari is a town and a nagar panchayat in Banda district in the Indian state of Uttar Pradesh.

== Geography ==
Tindwari is located at 25.62°N 80.53°E. It has an average elevation of 114 metres (374 feet).

== Demographics ==
As of 2001 India census, Tindwari had a population of 9,544. Males constitute 54% of the population and females 46%. Tindwari has an average literacy rate of 53%, lower than the national average of 59.5%: male literacy is 64%, and female literacy is 41%. In Tindwari, 19% of the population is under 6 years of age.
