= Vishambhar Singh Yadav =

Indian politician

- Education: Dayanand College of Law, DAV College, Kanpur; Kanpur University
- Political party: Samajwadi Party

Vishambhar Singh Yadav (born 1 January 1955) is a Samajwadi Party politician in India. He is third term member of legislative assembly for Baberu in the Uttar Pradesh.

== Early life and background ==
He was born in a small village named Paprenda, in the district of Banda, in Baberu, Uttar Pradesh, India, where his father Maheshwari Singh Yadav was a landlord. He studied in Dayanand Anglo Vedic Degree College, Kanpur and gained a master's degree in arts from Kanpur University, Kanpur. He is married to Rama Yadav, with whom he has three sons Vivek, Varun and Gaurav. He is an advocate, agriculturist, politician and social worker.

== Political career ==
Vishambhar Singh Yadav started his career as a student leader of DAV college Kanpur and became president of DAV college. He became a member of Uttar Pradesh legislative assembly two times in 2007, 2012 and 2022 from Baberu, Banda seat.
