= Atarra =

- Town
- Location in Uttar Pradesh, India Atarra (India)
- Coordinates: 25.28°N 80.57°E
- Country: India
- State: Uttar Pradesh
- District: Banda

Area
  - Town: 755 km^{2} (292 sq mi)
  - Urban: 18.30 km^{2} (7.07 sq mi)
  - Rural: 737.10 km^{2} (284.60 sq mi)
- Elevation: 124 m (407 ft)

Population (2011)
  - Town: 47,419
  - Density: 62.8/km^{2} (163/sq mi)

Languages
  - Official: Hindi
- Time zone: UTC+5:30 (IST)
- Postal code: 210201
- Vehicle registration: UP-90
- Website: atarramunicipal.com

Atarra is a town and a municipal board in Banda district in the state of Uttar Pradesh, India. It is located at a distance of 32 km from Banda. The town is divided into 25 wards.

== Geography ==
Atarra is located at 25.28°N 80.57°E and has an average elevation of 124 m (407 ft). It lies on the Indo-Gangetic Plain. Nahar Canal passes nearby the town.

== Demographics ==
As of 2011 census, the town had a population of 47,419 in 8,618 Households. The total population constitute, 25,098 males and 22,321 females with a sex ratio of 983 females per 1,000 males. 4,533 children are in the age group of 0–6 years, of which 2,325 are boys and 2,208 are girls with a sex ratio of 889. The average literacy rate stands at 78.59% with 32,215 literates of which, males were 18,996 while females were 13,219 and 15,204 Illiterates.

Schedule Caste are with a population of 10,445 whereas Schedule Tribe had a population of 80.

=== Work Profile ===
As per the report published by Census India in 2011, 14,367 people were engaged in work activities out of the total population of Atarra which includes 15,110 males and 5,461 females.

According to census survey report 2011, 11,939 workers describe their work as main work, 1,447 as Cultivators, 1,092 persons work as Agricultural labourers. 630 are working in Household industry and 8,770 are involved in other works. Of them 2,428 are Marginal workers.

== Transportation ==
State run Uttar Pradesh State Road Transport Corporation bus services from Atarra to various parts of the state. Atarra falls under Chitrakoot division. Atarra railway station serves the city. It has two Platforms and is located in North-Eastern part of the city.

== Education ==
- Rajkiya Engineering College, Banda
- Atarra Post Graduate College
- Govt ITI college
- Saraswati Inter college, Atarra
- HIC, Atarra
- Brahm vigyan Inter college, Atarra
- Government Ayurvedic College and Hospital

== Religion Site ==
- Gaura Baba Temple Naraini Road, Atarra
- Sharda Mata Mandir
- Sai Baba temple
