= Baberu =

- Town
- Location in Uttar Pradesh, India
- Coordinates: 25.55°N 80.72°E
- Country: India
- State: Uttar Pradesh
- District: Banda
- Elevation: 112 m (367 ft)

Population (2011)
  - Total: 15,156

Languages
  - Official: Hindi& urdu
- Time zone: UTC+5:30 (IST)
- PIN: 210121
- Telephone code: 05190

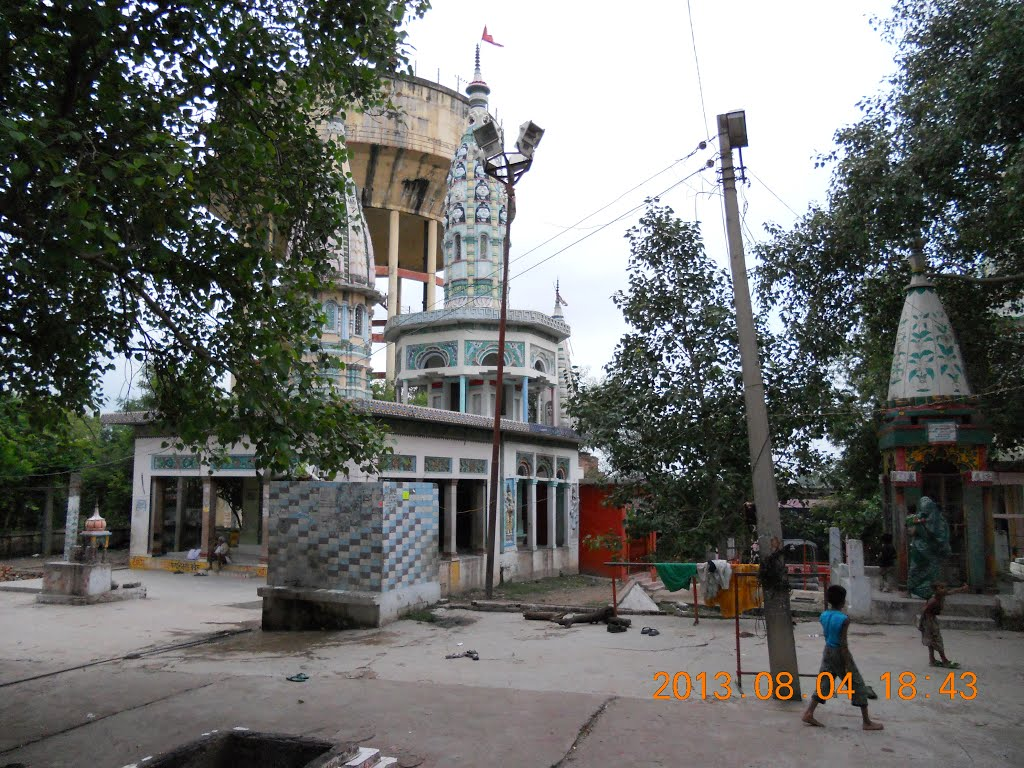
A major temple in Baberu Banda

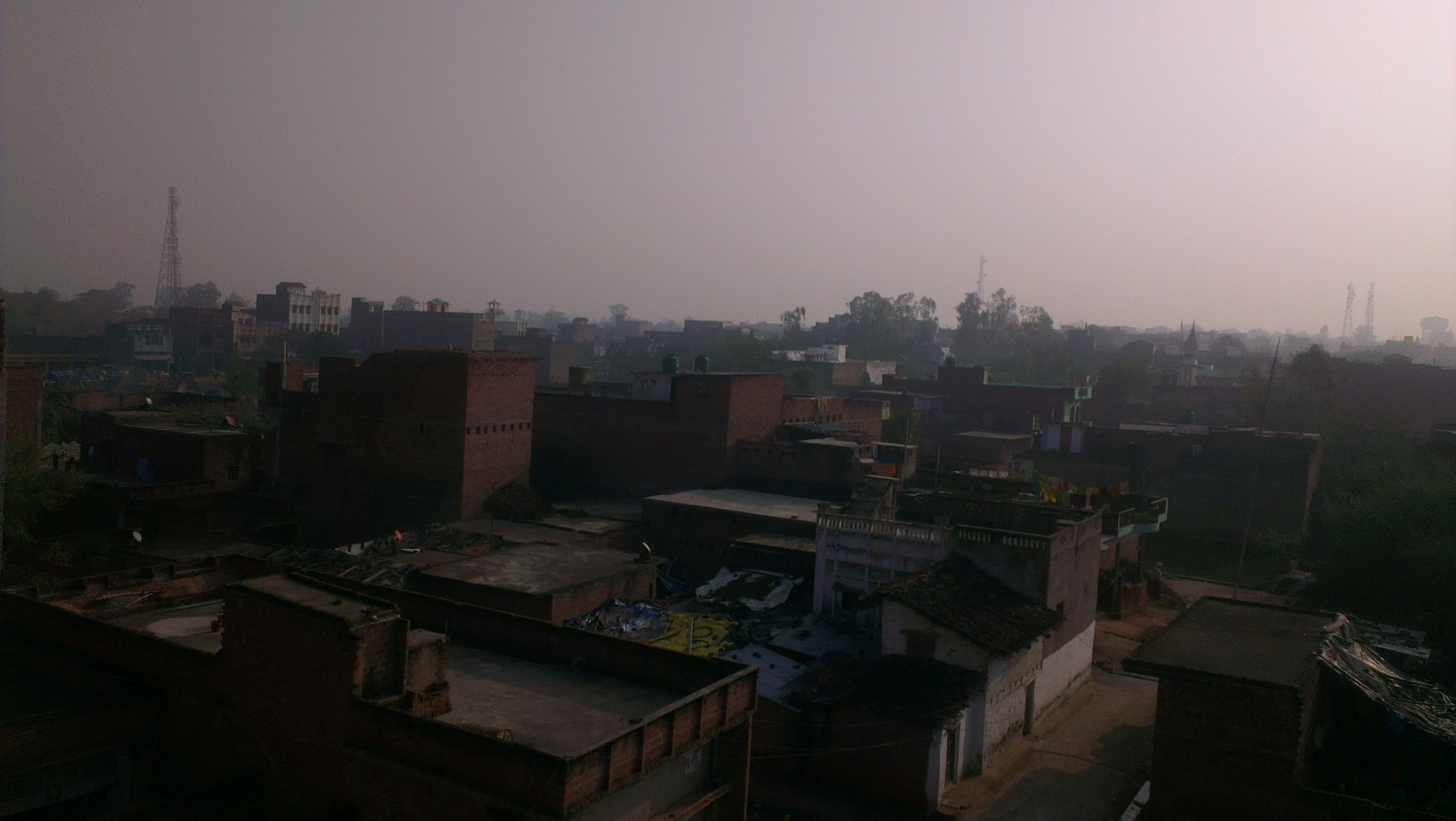
Aerial view of Baberu from Nahar Patri

Baberu is a town and a nagar panchayat in Banda district in the state of Uttar Pradesh, India. It is one of four tehsils (subdistricts) of the Banda district.

The nearest river that flows to this tehsil is the Yamuna, which is 18 km away from this place. There is a major temple called Madidai Ka Mandir.

It is connected to major cities by paved single lane roads, and is about 130 km from Kanpur and 168 km from Lucknow, the capital of Uttar Pradesh.

== Description ==
Baberu is located at 25.55°N 80.72°E. It has an average elevation of 112 metres (367 feet).

Baberu's climate is characterized by a hot summer (March-June), pleasant monsoon (July to September and cold winter (October-February).

As of 2001 India census, Baberu had a population of 14,499. Males constitute 54% of the population and females 46%. Baberu has an average literacy rate of 60%, higher than the national average of 59.5%, with 64% of the males and 36% of females literate. 17% of the population is under 6 years of age.

There are a few small local schools. i.e. New Lucknow Public School located at Banda Road is a CBSE affiliated English Medium School. Agriculture is the primary industry.

- 2022up - Vishambhar singh yadav
- 2017 - Chandrapal Kushwaha (Babuji) (BJP)
- 2012 - Vishambhar Singh Yadav (SP)
- 2007 - Vishambhar Singh Yadav (SP)
- 2002 - Gaya Charan Dinkar (BSP)
- 1996 - Skiv Shankar (BJP)
- 1993 - Gaya Charan Dinkar (BSP)
- 1991 - Gaya Charan Dinkar (BSP)
- 1989 - Dev Kumar Yadav
- 1985 - Dev Kumar Yadav
- 1980 - Rameshwar Bhai
- 1977 - Dev Kumar Yadav
- 1974 - Dev Kumar Yadav
- 1969 - Durhjan Bhai
- 1967 - Deshraj Singh
- 1962 - Deshraj Singh
- 1957 - Ramsanehi Bhartiya
- 1951 - Ramsanehi Bhartiya
