= Banda district, India =

Coordinates: 25°30′N 80°30′E

Banda district
- District
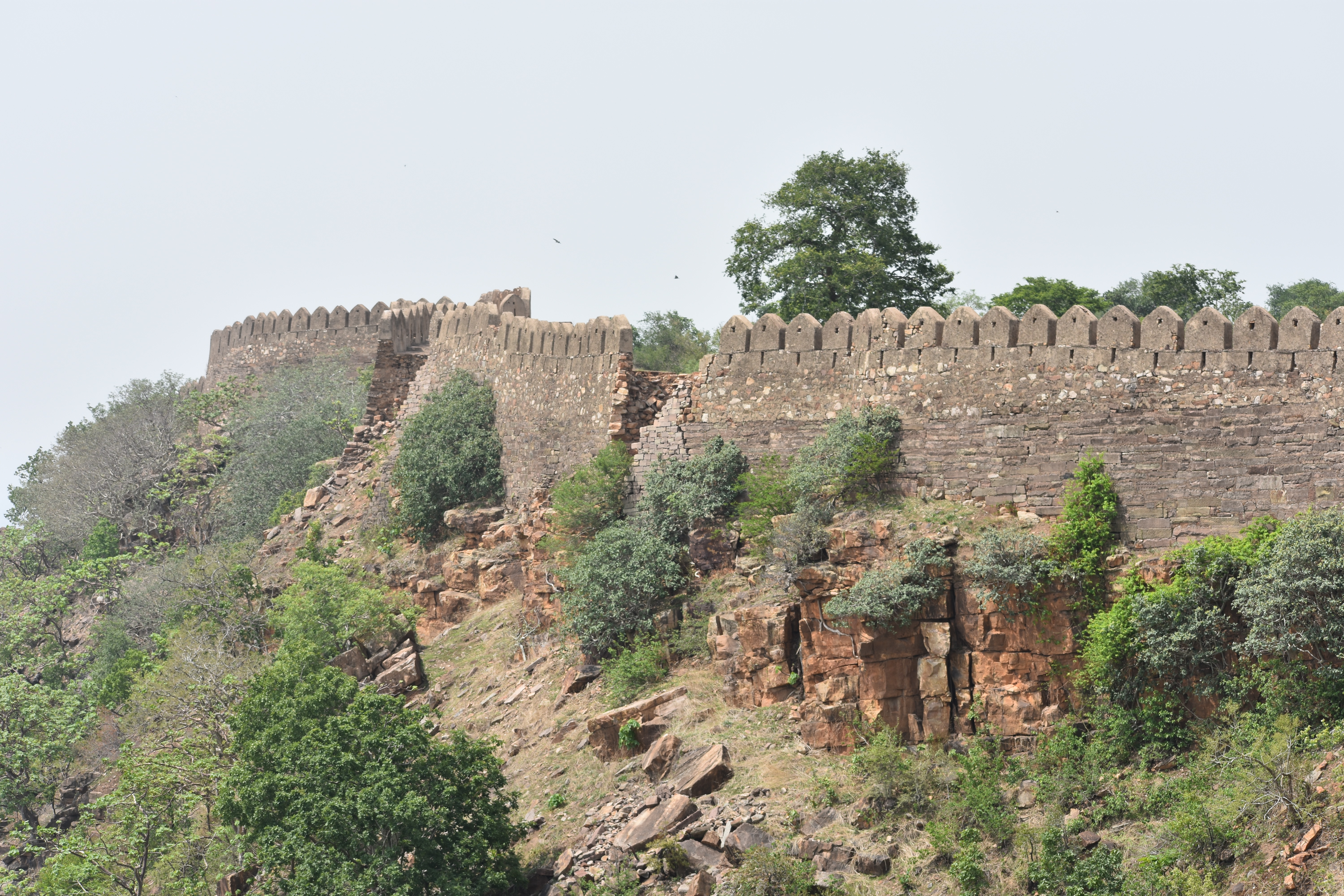
- Kalinjar Fort

- Location of Banda district in Uttar Pradesh
- Country: India
- State: Uttar Pradesh
- Division: Chitrakoot
- Headquarters: Banda

Government
  - District Collector: J. Reebha (IAS)
  - Lok Sabha constituencies: Banda (shared with Chitrakoot district)

Area
  - Total: 4,413 km^{2} (1,704 sq mi)

Population (2011)
  - Total: 1,799,410
  - Density: 407.8/km^{2} (1,056/sq mi)
  - Urban: 275,755

Demographics
  - Literacy: 68.11 per cent
  - Sex ratio: 863
- Time zone: UTC+05:30 (IST)
- Website: banda.nic.in

Banda district is a district of Uttar Pradesh state of India, and Banda is the district headquarters. It is a part of Chitrakoot Division.

Located in historical Bundelkhand region, Banda is famous for its Shajar stone which is used for making jewellery, and the historically and architecturally significant sites Khajuraho and Kalinjar. Khajuraho is a World Heritage Site famous for its elaborately carved temples. The fortress of Kalinjar is famed for its war history and its glorious rock sculptures.

== History ==
In 1998, the tehsils of Karwi and Mau, formerly part of Banda District, became the new Chitrakoot District. Banda was a town and district of British India, in the Allahabad division of the United Provinces. The population in 2011 was 1,799,410. It was formerly, but is no longer, a military cantonment.

=== Administrative divisions ===
There are five Tahsils namely Banda, Naraini, Baberu, Pailani and Atarra comprising eight blocks of Badokhar-khurd, Jaspura, Tindwari, Naraini, Mahua, Baberu, Bisanda and Kamasin from the present district of Banda.

There are seventeen thanas namely Kotwali City, Kotwali Dehat, Mataundh, Tindwari, Pailani, Chilla, Naraini, Atarra, Girwa, Kalinjar, Badousa, Bisanda, Baberu, Kamasin, Fatehganj, Jaspura and Marka.

=== Hills ===
The hills of the district consist of the part of the Vindhyan plateau which lies in the extreme southern portion of the tahsils Mau and Karwi (now known as the district Chitrakut). The northern flank of the Vindhyas known as Vindhyachal range, starts near the Yamuna in the extreme east of tahsil Mau. It recedes from the Yamuna in a south-westerly direction-gradually rising in elevation, although nowhere above 450 metre from the mean sea level. It leaves the district near the scared hills of Anusuiya to reappear of Godhrampur in the south-eastern part of Naraini tahsil. From this point westward to Kalinjar the hills from the border of the district.

== Geography ==
The district largely consists of irregular uplands with outcrops of rocks intermingling with lowlands, which are frequently under water during the rainy season. The Baghein River traverses the district from south-west to north-east. Other important rivers are the Ken River in the east and the Yamuna to the north. The dominant communities of this area are of Kshatriyas, Patels, Chandrauls, Chandelas, Bundelas etc.

=== Location and boundaries ===
The district is located in the Chitrakutdham Division of Uttar Pradesh with its headquarter at Banda and lies between Lat. 24º 53' and 25º 55' N and Long. 80º 07' and 81º 34' E. It is bounded in the north by district of Fatehpur in the east by the district of Chitrakut in the west by the district of Hamirpur and Mahoba and in the south by Satna, Panna, and Chhatarapur the districts of adjoining Madhya Pradesh.

== Agriculture ==
There are two main crops: Kharif and Rabi; the one between July and October and the other between November and March. The old records in the imperial gazetteer or the district gazetteer mentions cotton as one of the major crops here. But that has vanished now. The main crops grown presently are as follows:

Kharif: Paddy, jowar, bajra, til, moong, urd, arhar and sanai are the main crops taken these days. Paddy is normally taken as mono crop while others are mixed sown. 100 years ago cotton was taken as a mixed crop along with other crops in Kharif. Presently Government is pushing soybean replacing all other Kharif crops. This tendency ultimately will starve this district.

Rabi: Wheat, barley along with gram, linseed, mustard, masoor and peas are the major crops. There is a tendency for mixed cropping and regional variation in choices of the crops depending upon the geographical situation and the availability of irrigation.

Zaid: the third crops are usually taken in the river beds; that includes Kakri. Tarbooj (water melon), Kharbooja and some vegetables.

== Economy ==
The economy is predominantly agricultural, with the main crops being paddy rice, wheat and vegetables.

In 2006 the Ministry of Panchayati Raj named Banda one of the country's 250 most backward districts (out of a total of 640). It is one of the 34 districts in Uttar Pradesh currently receiving funds from the Backward Regions Grant Fund Programme (BRGF).

== Divisions ==
The district is divided into five tehsils, Banda, Naraini, Baberu, Atarra and Pailani.

=== Villages ===
- Barehta
- Tindwari
- Mandwal

== Demographics ==
Historical population
Year	Pop.	±% p.a.
1901	406,944	—
1911	424,056	+0.41%
1921	396,194	−0.68%
1931	421,181	+0.61%
1941	486,491	+1.45%
1951	519,370	+0.66%
1961	631,666	+1.98%
1971	792,699	+2.30%
1981	1,023,644	+2.59%
1991	1,237,962	+1.92%
2001	1,501,602	+1.95%
2011	1,799,410	+1.83%

Religions in Banda district (2011)
Religion	Percent
Hinduism	91.00%
Islam	8.76%
Other or not stated	0.24%
Distribution of religions

According to the 2011 census Banda District has a population of 1,799,410, roughly equal to the nation of The Gambia or the US state of Nebraska. This gives it a ranking of 265th in India (out of a total of 640). The district has a population density of 404 inhabitants per square kilometre (1,050/sq mi). Its population growth rate over the decade 2001–2011 was 17.06%. Banda has a sex ratio of 863 females for every 1000 males, and a literacy rate of 68.11%. 15.32% of the population lives in urban areas. Scheduled Castes make up 21.55% of the population.

=== Languages ===
Languages of Banda district (2011)
1. Hindi (95.8%)
2. Bundeli (1.96%)
3. Urdu (1.50%)
4. Others (0.73%)

At the time of the 2011 Census of India, 95.81% of the population in the district spoke Hindi, 1.96% Bundeli and 1.50% Urdu as their first language. The local dialect changes from Bundeli in the south to Awadhi in the north.

Among Banda's languages are Bundeli, which has a lexical similarity of 72-91% with Hindi (compared to 60% for German and English) and is spoken by about 7,800,000 people in Bundelkhand.

== Education ==
- Government Medical College, Banda
- Rajkiya Engineering College, Banda

== Culture ==
Kalinjar Mahotsava: Every Year Banda District celebrates week-long Kalinjar Mahotasava to promote Kalinjar Fort's Heritage & Tourism. Kalinjar Mahotsava includes many Cultural and Social activities.

== Banda MLA & MPs ==
There are 4 assembly constituencies and 1 parliamentary constituency.

=== MLA ===
No	Constituency	MLA	Political Party
232	Tindwari	Ramakesh Nishad	Bhartiya Janta Party
233	Baberu	Vishambhar Singh Yadav	Samajwadi Party
234	Naraini	Smt. Ommani Verma	Bhartiya Janta Party
235	Banda	Prakash Dwivedi	Bhartiya Janta Party

=== MP ===
Constituency	MP	Political Party
Banda	Krishna Devi Shivshanker	Samajwadi Party

== People associated with Banda ==
- Nasimuddin Siddiqui, Former UP cabinet minister is from Banda
- Babu Singh Kushwaha, Former UP cabinet minister is from Banda
- Daddu Prasad, Former UP minister

== See also ==
- Banda
- List of constituencies of the Lok Sabha

== Gallery ==
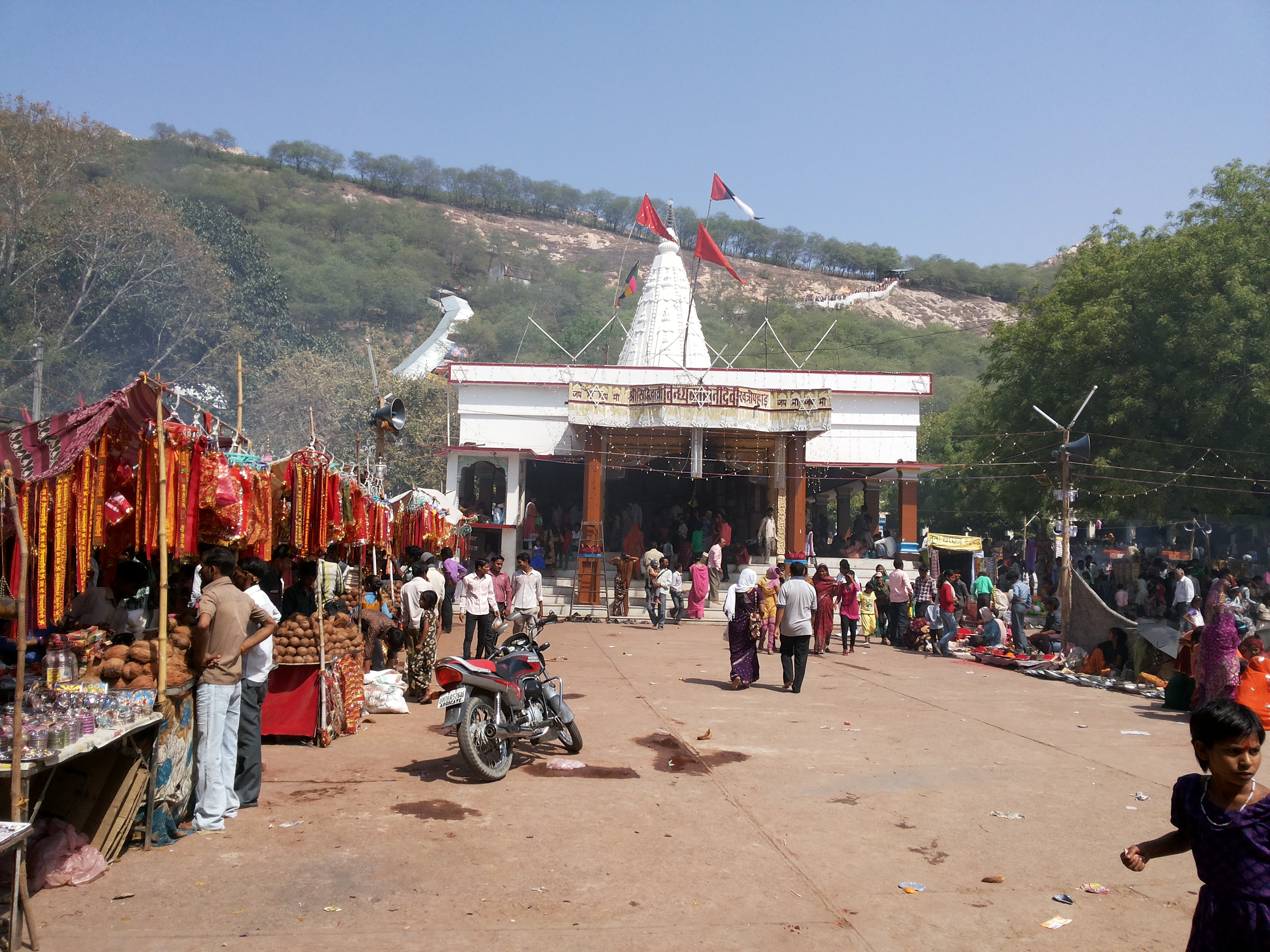
Khatri Pahar temple, local tourist attraction near to Banda City
