= Manyawar Shri Kanshiram Ji Green Eco Garden =

Park in Uttar Pradesh, India

Coordinates: 26.810966°N 80.919377°E

- मान्यावर श्री कांशीराम जी ग्रीन इको गार्डन
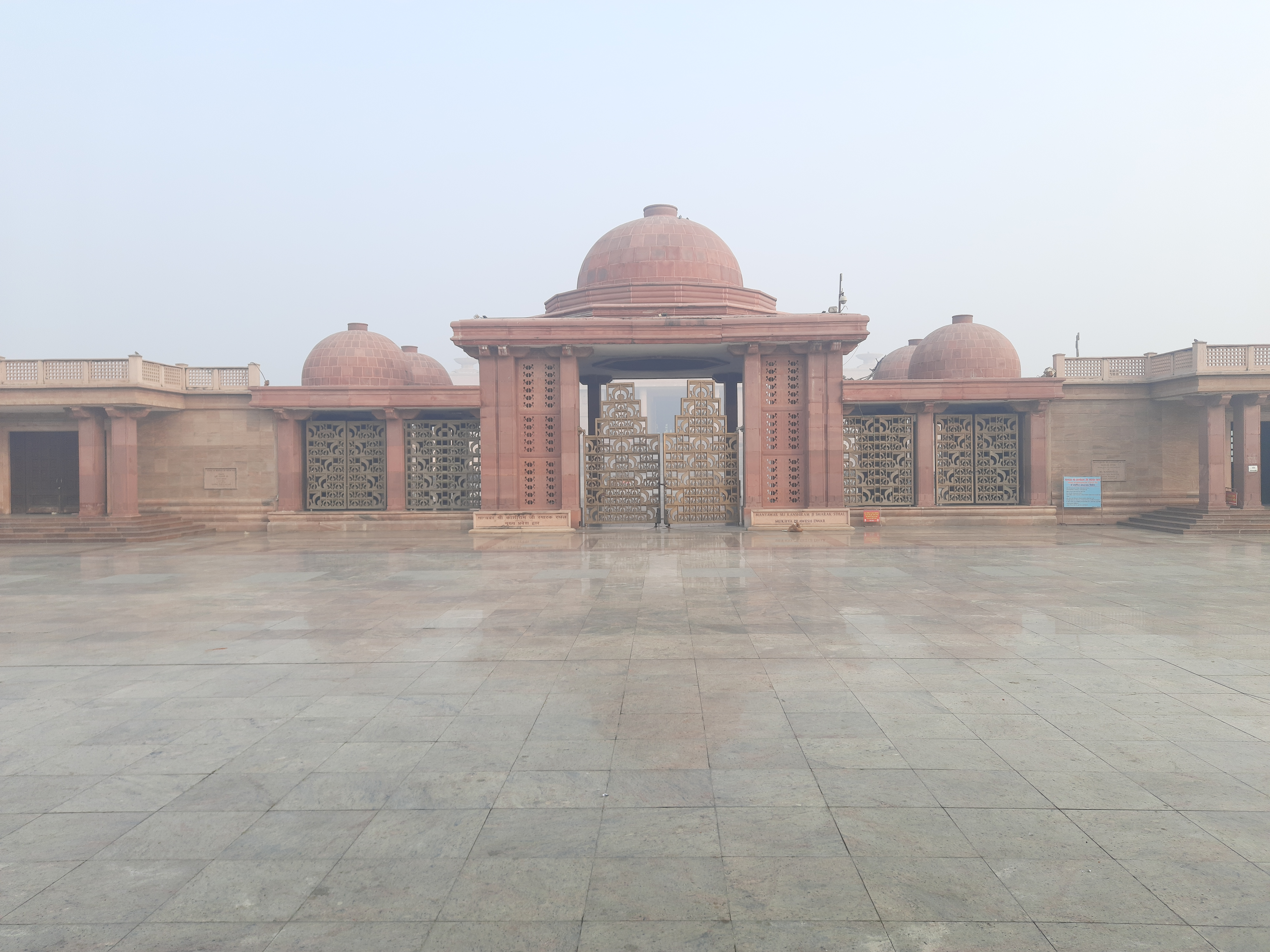
- Manyawar Kanshiram Smarak Sthal entrance
- Interactive map of Manyawar Shri Kanshiram Ji Green Eco Garden
- Type: Public
- Nearest city: Lucknow, Uttar Pradesh
- Designer: Mayawati
- Operator: Smarak Suraksha Samiti Lucknow
- Status: open

The Manyawar Shri Kanshiram Ji Green Eco Garden (Hindi:मान्यावर श्री कांशीराम जी ग्रीन इको गार्डन), also known as Eco Gardens Lucknow, is an ecological garden in Lucknow, India named after Kanshi Ram, the founder of the Bahujan Samaj Party.

== Manyawar Kanshiram Smarak Sthal ==
The Manyawar Kanshiram Smarak Sthal (or Kanshi Ram Memorial) is a memorial dedicated to Kanshi Ram, the founder of BAMCEF, DS4, and the Bahujan Samaj Party, situated on VIP Road in Lucknow. This monument features a large dome with a diameter of 39.84 metres. Followers of the Bahujan movement typically gather here for the birth and death anniversaries of Ram.

== Baudh Vihar Shanti Upvan ==
Baudh Vihar Shanti Upvan, situated on VIP Road, Lucknow, is a 32.5-acre Vihara that serves as a residence for Buddhist monks (Bhikkhu) and a resting, reading, and meditating place for followers of Buddhism. The site features an 18-foot, four-faced white marble statue of Gautama Buddha, surrounded by two bronze fountains, each 28 feet high. This Vihara includes a library with an encyclopedia of Buddhism for study purposes in addition a large meditation hall.
