= Abdul Hameed Azhari =

Indian Islamic scholar

Hazrat, Maulana Abdul Hameed Azhari
- Official name: Abdul Hameed Azhari

Personal life
- Born: 1944 Malegaon, Maharashtra
- Died: 4 December 2021 (aged 76–77) Malegaon
- Home town: Malegaon
- Education: Darul Uloom Deoband; Al-Azhar University

Religious life
- Religion: Islam
- Movement: Deobandi movement

Abdul Hameed Azhari (1944 — 4 December 2021) was an Indian Dalit Rights Activist and Islamic scholar. He was a Member of All India Muslim Personal Law Board and the National President of Rashtriya Muslim Morcha, an organization working under The All India Backward and Minority Communities Employees Federation, founded by Waman Meshram.

He was one of the founders and also served as the chief patron of Kul Tanzeem-e-Jamaat, an organization formed after 2006 Malegaon blasts to seek legal justice for local youth arrested in the case.

== Education ==
He was born in 1944 in Malegaon, Maharashtra.

Abdul Hameed Azhari started his education from Madrasa Millat under the tutelage of Maulana Abdul Hameed Nomani. Upon completing early education, he went to Darul Uloom Deoband. He later graduated from Al-Azhar Cairo, Egypt.

== Death ==
Abdul Hameed Azhari died on 4 December 2021 and was buried at Bada Qabristan, Malegaon. His Namaz-e-Janaza was led by his son, Hifzur Rahman.

On his death, Maulana Khalid Saifullah Rahmani, Mufti Ismail Abdul Khalique Qasmi, Maulana Sajjad Nomani and others shown their grief and condolences.
