= Caste politics =

Identity politics on caste system lines in India

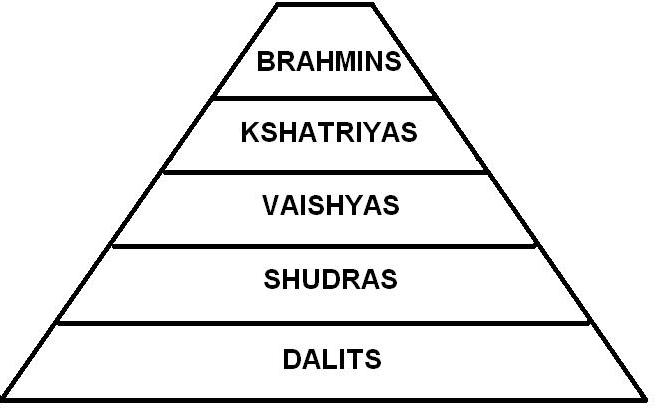
A diagram depicting the structure of varnas in India. See more at Caste system in India.

In India, a caste is a (usually endogamous) social group where membership is decided by birth. Broadly, Indian castes are divided into the Forward Castes, Other Backward Classes, Scheduled Castes, and Scheduled Tribes. Indian Christians and Indian Muslims are also function as castes (a full list of castes can be found at the end of this article). With castes separating individuals into different social groups, it follows that each group will have conflicting interests; oftentimes putting those with lower social standing in less favorable positions. An attempt to address this inequality has been the reservation system, which essentially acts as affirmative action to provide representation to caste groups that have been systematically disadvantaged. There have also been other cases where political parties, like the Bahujan Samaj Party (BSP), was formed to challenge the power of the upper castes.

The role that castes play in India's political system was institutionalised by the British colonist where upper-caste dominance within government was perpetuated and reinforced. Although there were efforts to address this discrepancy through measures like the Communal Award and educational empowerment (see 'Sanskritization'), this remained the status quo until the 1990s when an economic liberalisation in India diminished state control and fueled the rise of caste-centric parties focused on empowering lower castes. However, these parties were often rife with corruption as it was seen as a way to level the playing field. Leaders of what came to be known as 'caste mafia' took advantage of lower caste dissent towards upper caste institutions and openly robbed state institutions.

Caste not only determines one's role in political institutions; it also influences access to resources like land as well as police and judicial assistance. Despite the traditional dominance of upper caste parties, the concentration of lower caste individuals in specific areas can lead to regional dominance, impacting political representation. However, this mainly impacts male members of the lower castes as women from lower castes have traditionally been excluded from participating in the political sphere. This discrimination has continued in recent times as women from lower castes are continued to be looked down upon for their low educational levels. Organizations such as the Gulabi Gang as well as the United Nations are currently working to improve lower caste women's social mobility and independence.

== History ==
Historically, it has been very hard to change the structure of caste politics in India. More recently however, there has been a flux in caste politics, mainly caused by economic liberalisation in India. Contemporary India has seen the influence of caste start to decline. This is partly due to the spread of education to all castes which has had a democratising effect on the political system. However, this "equalising" of the playing field has not been without controversy. The Mandal Commission and its quotas system has been a particularly sensitive issue.

=== Colonial history ===
The British institutionalised caste into the workings of the major government institutions within India. The main benefactors of this indirect rule were the upper castes or forward castes, which maintained their hegemony and monopoly of control and influence over government institutes long after independence from the British. The state of post-colonial India promised development, rule of law, and nation building, but in reality, was a complex network of patronage systems, which solidified the upper-caste position of dominance over civil service institutions. This network undermined the very promises of 'nation building' that post-colonial India had made and ushered in an area of upper-caste dominance that lasted for the next four decades.

In August 1932, the then Prime Minister of Britain, Ramsay MacDonald, made what became known as the Communal Award. According to it, separate representation was to be provided for communities such as the Dalit, Muslims, Sikhs, Indian Christians, Anglo-Indians and Europeans. These depressed classes were assigned a number of seats to be filled by election from special constituencies in which only voters belonging to these classes could vote.

==== Caste-based mobilisation ====
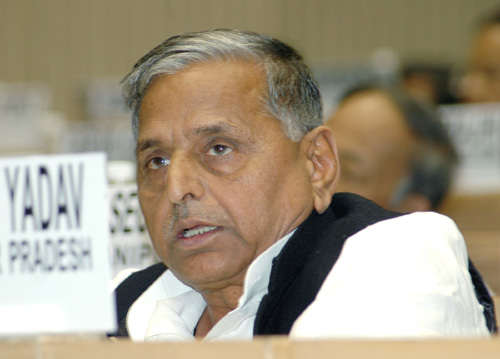
Mulayam Singh Yadev was the founder of the Samajwadi Party. Another notable member of the founding member is Beni Prasad Verma

The rise of caste-based mobilisation allowed marginalized caste groups to move past the mere consolations of legislative abolition, extending caste into the political frameworks. The term refers to the 'second democratic upsurge' from the late 1980s with high voter turnout and representation of lower-caste communities in state and national assemblies. Caste-based political mobilizations carried out by regional parties, like the Samajwadi Party and the Bahujan Samaj Party, especially in agrarian settings. The objective was caste-empowerment, aimed at resisting the inequalities perpetuated by the oppression of powerful upper-caste bureaucracies and governments. Regional political parties tapped into frustrations of marginalization by lower-caste communities. However, the rise of caste politics has not necessarily resulted in developmental gains for those at the bottom of the caste ladder.

Published studies have presented evidence suggesting that the influence of caste has been declining since the mid-1990s, including areas in rural India where the higher class castes held greater dominance over lower class castes, and also in urban interaction and hereditary occupations. Rather than a long-established, unchanging institution, caste is subject to political influence. Changes in political leadership throughout the history of India have led to changes in the structure of the caste system. India's colonial past has shaped caste into a flexible institution, generating a new system that has crucial influences on political mobilisation. In some regions of India, strategic reconstructions of the caste system have taken place. For instance, the Bahujan Samaj Party in the state of Punjab was first initiated by urban political entrepreneurs who belonged to the former lower caste groups. The pliable caste system in the post-independence era acts as a tool for identifying marginal groups and political mobilisation. Various political leaderships can alter and influence the caste system to give different groups of people unequal rights in accessing public services and political competition.

A distinct feature of lower caste mobilization in North India is the importance of 'Sanskritization' as ideological grounds; by comparison, 'ethnicization' has been more prevalent in West and South India. Sanskritization refers to the process of emulation that lower castes may adopt, to enhance their status in society by mirroring Brahminical (upper caste) rituals and values. In contrast, ethnicization endeavors to establish a separate identity for a lower caste group because the objective is to produce "nonhierarchical social imaginaries." For instance, the Yadav caste group did not resort to inventing a Dravidian identity to position themselves against the Aryan identity, as leaders in the South and the West had done. Instead, the key logic was to enhance their status by identifying themselves within the Aryan group. At the same time, the two processes are not mutually exclusive, and most leaders wanted to develop separate identities from the dominant culture. The prominent influence of Sanskritization meant that mobilizations in the North were restricted by conforming to the existing hierarchies, and in practical terms, this reinforced the dominance of elites within a specific region.

==== Education ====
Education spread to the lower castes after India gained independence. The younger generations of all castes have had access to educational resources since the 1980s. The number of the Scheduled and Backward Castes people receiving education increased at a faster rate than that of the upper caste groups. The spread of education to all castes generated democratizing effects. Some representatives of the SC and ST groups obtained access to Congress in the 1950s~1960s (1179). Due to their higher education levels, they are less likely to respond to the upper-caste patrons, but to the needs and interests of the lower castes.

== Caste and political power ==
The removal of the boundaries between "civil society" and "political society" meant that caste now played a huge role in the political arena and also influenced other government-run institutions such as police and the judicial system. Though caste seemed to dictate one's access to such institutions, the location of that caste also played an important role. If a lower caste were concentrated enough in one area, it could then translate that pocket of concentration of its caste members into political power and then challenge the hegemony of locally dominant upper caste. Gender also plays a significant role in the power dynamic of caste in politics. Women's representation within the political system seems to also be tied to their caste. Lower, more conservative castes have less female participation in politics than upper, more socially liberal, castes. This has caused a disproportionately large number of upper-caste women to occupy political office when compared to their lower caste counterparts. The hierarchy of caste and its role in politics and access to power and resources has created a society of patron-client relationships along caste lines. This eventually led to the practice of vote banking, where voters back only candidates that are in their caste, or officials from which they expect to receive some kind of benefits.

The caste system has traditionally had significant influence over people's access to power. The privileged upper caste groups benefit more by gaining substantially more economic and political power, while the lower caste groups have limited access to those powers. The caste system distributes to different castes different economic strengths. The upper caste groups can then manipulate the economic and political system to transfer economic strength into political power.

It has been argued by Professor Dipankar Gupta that the role of castes in Indian elections have been overplayed.

=== Access to power ===
In rural North India, upper and middle-ranking castes dominate the ownership of land. They were able to transfer this control over wealth into political dominance over the Panchayat decision. The Panchayat is a local government unit that is in-charge of resources disbursement. The dominant caste groups monopolised leadership positions in the Panchayat, thus gaining more opportunities to government contracts, employment and funding.

Access to police and judicial assistance also depends on which caste one belongs to. By bribing, influencing and intimidating the police and judicial officials, the rural north Indian middle and upper castes tend to manipulate the local police and judicial power more successfully. These types of political rent-seeking have also helped secure the supply of rents to dominant castes through other channels such as 'rigging Panchayat elections, capturing electoral booths, and using pre-election intimidatory tactics in elections for the state assembly.' Whether an individual or a group can raise enough money for constant bribes depends on the caste-based socioeconomic status. Hence, the advantage in accessing economic resources not only transfers into but also reinforces the political might of the dominant caste groups.

Certain scientists and activists, such as MIT systems scientist Dr. VA Shiva Ayyadurai, blame caste for holding back innovation and scientific research in India, making it difficult to sustain progress while regressive social organisation prevails.

Caste, ascribed at birth, is also influenced by where one is born. Political lines in India have often been drawn along caste lines; however, this is only part of the story. Caste is often specific to a particular area. These caste pockets create a locally dominant castes. Because of the political structure in India, local dominance can translate into regional dominance. This concentration of caste population has meant that smaller, less influential castes have the opportunity stake there claims in the political power arena. However, if a non-dominant caste is not concentrated in a particular area, then they are not likely to get any representation without teaming up with another caste to increase their influence. This means that "localized concentration facilitates a space for contesting the domination of State-level dominant caste". For instance, the Maratha-Kunbi caste has concentrations of populations all over the Indian states. They thus managed to receive maximum representation at the state legislature.

Though the caste system factors greatly in determining who makes up the local elites, it also plays a huge role in determining women's influence and representation in the political system. In India's bicameral parliamentary system, women represent a minuscule amount of each house. Of the people's assembly, made up of 545 members, women represent a mere 5.2 percent; and in the State assembly, with 259 members, women make up only 8.8 percent. Both houses have seen an alarming decline in female representatives in the most recent decades. Of the 39 women representatives in the Indian Parliament most were members of higher castes. Caste, which eventually effects class, is one of the most important factors in determining a woman's successful inclusion into the political system. This may be due to the fact that higher castes challenge the role of the traditional Indian woman and so their caste position gives them a greater range of options that are not available to lower more traditional castes. This inflated representation of elite caste in public offices has meant that the impact they have on public policy is disproportionately large in comparison to their actual numbers.

=== Political corruption ===
Corruption thus translated into power and a means to enter the political arena, once only open to upper caste members. Corruption in India became a way to level the playing field. This struggle for empowerment that was forced to operate outside of the rule of law produced caste-based mafia networks. These mafia-networks began to chip away at upper caste control over state institutions.

However, unlike their predecessor, these caste mafia groups were not concerned with 'development', but mainly viewed elections and democracy as a way of gaining control of the state, which would enable them to level social inequalities. This new state envisioned a government of "Social Justice" through caste empowerment. Within the context of "social justice" corruption pontificated by the caste mafias became tolerated, and in some cases, as in the province of Bihar, even celebrated.

The very nature of caste politics inherently means that there are no boundaries between "civil society" and "political society", as demonstrated by the proliferation caste mafia. The mafia dons became mayors, ministers, and even members of Parliament. Therefore, there was no alternative to fight against these mafia figures and political brokers. Because rule of law was perceived to be a mechanism of upper caste control, corruption used by caste mafia became popularly accepted, as it was perceived to be a means to achieve lower caste empowerment. The corruption elevated to such a level that nearly all elected officials in some towns and regions were also criminals. The upper castes who had used their control over the state to discreetly plunder its institutions for their own gain, were now replaced by the mafia dons who now openly pillaged the state institutions. Many of these elected ministers/mafia dons were jailed for the illegal practices they employed; however, this was widely touted as the upper castes trying to regain dominance by eliminating supporters. Corruption and politics became so common that at a time it was not uncommon for election results to be contested from a prison cell.

Corruption therefore translated into power and a means to enter the political arena, once only open to upper caste members. In this way corruption was seen as a way to level the playing field. As a result, corruption was tolerated and in some villages championed under the banner of "social justice".

In the 1951 election, three ethnic parties challenged the Congress party: the Ram Rajya Parishad, the Hindu Mahasabha, and the Bharatiya Jana Sangh. These three parties sought to gain support from the Hindu majority. The All India Scheduled Caste Federation bid for support from the ex-untouchable castes. Three of the four ethnic parties gradually disappeared because they were not able to obtain enough votes. In the late 1980s, the Congress began to decline. More non-congress parties started to challenge the Congress dominance. The Bharatiya Janata Party (BJP) descended from the Bharatiya Jana Sangh. It attempted to pit Hindus against Muslims. The Bahujan Samaj Party (BSP) and the Janata Dal (JD) tried to seek support from the Scheduled Castes, and Muslims against the upper castes.

The intense party competitions that started in the late 1970s have also weakened the influence of caste in Indian politics. Traditionally, Indian political parties have been constructed from top-down. Party leaders relied on preexisted patron-client networks to collect votes. Hence, no parties established fixed organisations to keep constant contacts with the village-level. Since 1977, the number of youth participating in politics has significantly increased. Due to the lack of fixed organisations, political parties had to rely on the young village members for political mobilisation. Often, these young villagers exerted more political influence than the upper caste leaders and patrons. The status of these young people in the village depended on how much he could contribute to the economic development of the village. It is easier for the youth to maintain their status by rallying rather than remain loyal to a specific party. This also weakened the influence of caste and clientelism on Indian politics.

In the 1990s, many parties Bahujan Samaj Party (BSP), the Janata Dal started claiming that they were representing the backward castes. Many such parties, relying primarily on Backward Classes' support, often in alliance with Dalits and Muslims, rose to power in Indian states. At the same time, many Dalit leaders and intellectuals started realising that the main Dalit oppressors were the so-called Other Backward Classes, and formed their own parties, such as the Indian Justice Party. The Congress (I) in Maharashtra long relied on OBCs' backing for its political success. Bharatiya Janata Party has also showcased its Dalit and OBC leaders to prove that it is not an upper-caste party. Bangaru Laxman, the former BJP president (2001–2002) was a former Dalit. Sanyasin Uma Bharati, former CM of Madhya Pradesh, who belongs to OBC caste, was a former BJP leader. In 2006 Arjun Singh cabinet minister for MHRD of the United Progressive Alliance (UPA) government was accused of playing caste politics when he introduced reservations for OBCs in educational institutions all around.

In Tamil Nadu, Dravida Munnetra Kazhagam (DMK) party rose to power promising representation of all castes in all important sectors of society.

=== Clientelism ===
Politics in India highly depended on patron-client ties along the caste lines during the Congress-dominating period. The caste that one belongs to serves as a strong determinant of his or her voting pattern. In India, different political parties represent the interests of different caste groups. The upper and merchant castes such as Brahmin, Rajput and Kayasth and the rich Muslim groups tend to express their interests through the Congress Party. The agrarian upper caste Jats tend to vote for the competing parties. Numerically minor parties, represented by the Jan Sangh, receive votes almost exclusively from the upper and trading castes. However, caste does not solely determine voting behaviours. Discrepancies occur especially for the upper caste groups. This means that not everyone from the same caste would vote for only one particular party. The upper caste people have more freedom to vote by political beliefs. The Mandal Commission covered more than 3000 Other Backward Castes. It is thus not clear which parties are associated with each castes.

Loyal groups of voters usually back a certain candidate or party during elections with the expectation of receiving benefits once their candidate is in office. This practice, called "votebank", is prolific throughout most regions of the country. Many political parties in India have openly indulged in caste-based votebank politics. The Congress party used votebank to maintain power; the competing parties constructed votebanks to challenge the Congress dominance of politics.

== Women in caste politics ==
Women in higher castes have always had the advantage to participate in the political sphere in comparison to their lower caste counterparts. While the exclusion of women in politics has long been and continues to be prominent in these caste-based countries, women in these upper castes are privy to resources—such as better social, economic, health, education, employment, and political standing—that Dalit, or untouchable, women could never attain and thus leave these women with little to no chance at political participation and representation.

=== Social standing ===
Dalit women are the lowest social class due to the intersectionality of their gender and untouchable social standing. These women have to work to provide for their families and complete domestic housework all while being subject to psychological and emotional abuse from their spouse. When working outside of the home, these women complete jobs alongside their male counterparts as hands in the fields and other low paid risky jobs. They work these laborious jobs to be able to afford basic necessities for their family and home such as shelter, food, and water. This idea of keeping Dalits away from higher castes in the workforce is more extreme than just the types of jobs the different castes work. When food is being served to workers, Dalits must eat away from higher castes. This separation extends to other basic necessities such as water. Dalits are not allowed to use the same water sources as the upper castes and if they do, untouchables risk physical abuse and the water tank needs to be purified.

Because untouchable women have no social standing, their issues are not noticed or deemed an issue in the political sphere. This lack of awareness creates a vicious cycle as these women must continue to work low paying jobs to be able to support their families and complete house work, so they do not have the time to dedicate to political intervention after this double-shift. Thereby, Dalit women are not represented in politics.

=== Economic standing ===
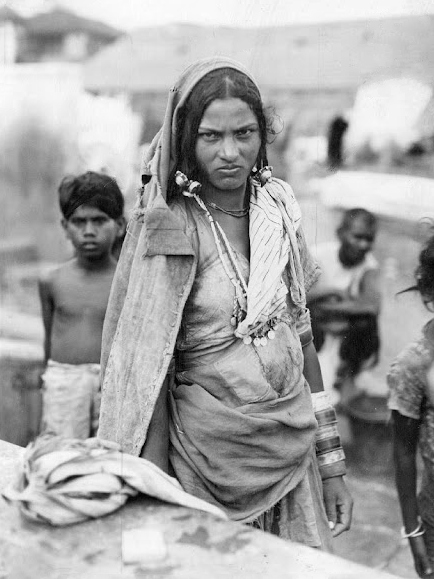
An Untouchable Woman of Bombay according to the Indian Caste System

Dalits do not have consistent pay. Usually, they will work seasonal jobs such as sewing clothes during the rainy season or fix tools when they are being used. These jobs are usually low-paying and short, causing Dalit women to take any job available to them at the time. Because of their need for money, women have turned to alternative forms of work such as sex work to be able to have consistent funds. Sometimes one income is not enough so Dalit families have begun to prepare their daughters for similar work.

These jobs do not have the credibility untouchable women would need to be taken seriously by politicians. Sex work is seen as promiscuous and perverted while upper caste women spend their time in the private sphere focusing on the house and the home. These jobs are safer and take less time, thus allowing upper caste women to be able to provide their attention to the feminist movement and gaining equal rights economically, politically, and socially to their upper caste male counterparts.

=== Health standing ===
Because of their sex work, Dalits are much more likely to suffer from diseases such as HIV and AIDS. Additionally, most Dalit live in unsanitary homes with high risk for disease. Because of this, Dalits are more likely to suffer from gastrointestinal, water, and airborne diseases in comparison to upper castes. Though, the ones most vulnerable to disease is Dalit women; They work both inside and out of the home meaning that they are more likely to catch and have to care for disease all while still having to complete their household work. They also have shorter life spans probably due to malnutrition and this increased risk for disease. This shorter lifespan causes Dalit women to have to have many pregnancies and births earlier in life in hopes that few of the children survive and thus help the family economically.

Because of their health issues and other responsibilities, Dalit women do not have the time nor the health to be able to gain any political standing. Instead, they must shift their focus to survive another day regardless of the conditions they are in economically, socially, and politically.

=== Educational standing ===
As the lowest class, Dalits and were not allowed to easily access education and Dalit women were completely prohibited. However, around 1950, Dalit women were granted access to education. This was not a smooth transition. Dalit women faced discrimination as their teachers were often from the Brahman class and enjoyed the power they held over Dalit women. This discrimination along with their needs to support their families led many Dalits and specifically Dalit women to drop out of school. In a study titled Access of Disadvantaged Children to Education 2005, as much as 30% of the schooled children dropout of school. Dalit women's literacy is below 5%.

Because of their lack of literacy, education, and priority to care for their families, Dalit women are not currently equipped to engaged in politics. They cannot read or understand any of the legislation that is written for or against them and do not have the time to fight for legislation that would benefit them as they must ensure their families well-being, a full-time job in and of itself.

=== Women's movements for Dalit women ===
Relatively recently, the position of Dalit women have been heard. Specifically, the creation of the Gulabi Gang and the United Nations have taken positions to help improve the lives of these women.

==== Gulabi Gang ====
The Gulabi Gang is not a gang in the traditional sense, the founder, Sampat Pal explained. The gang was founded in the poorest region in India and works to improve Dalit women's social mobility and independence while working to eradicate violence and oppression. The Gulabi Gang is known for its bright pink traditional saris and wielded bamboo sticks. Pal chose this color because it was free from any religious or political associations in India while the bamboo sticks prepare the women for any battle they may face.

If the gang is successful at lowering violence and oppression for all women in the caste system and specifically Dalit women, they would have the chance to engage in politics. These women are working to create change and allow Dalit women to live fulfilling lives and fight for what they believe in within the political and justice systems instead of being forced to provide for their families.

==== United Nations ====
The United Nations Office of the High Commissioner for Human Rights released a statement on 17 June 2014, titled "Violence against Women and Girls from caste-affected communities." The speech opens by claiming "caste-based discrimination fundamentally undermines human dignity" and explains how low-caste women such as Dalits face double discrimination against their gender and class which ultimately leads them to live low socioeconomic lives. The speech comes after the death of two Dalit girls whose village sat at the site of their death until their deaths were investigated. The global uproar of these deaths became so intense that the United Nations commented and committed themselves to help improve the position of low-caste women through legislation, humans' rights mechanisms, and special procedures.

If these methods are effective, Dalit women would be able to live sustainable lives that would not require them to constantly work low paying jobs, live in poverty, and eat better. In return, they would have more free time to be able to commit to politics and ultimately become an engaged and civically involved citizens.

== List of castes ==
For political/government purposes, the castes are broadly divided into

- Forward Castes (30.8% of the population)
- Other Backward Classes (OBC) (about 41.0% of the population)
- Scheduled Castes (about 19.7% of the population)
- Scheduled Tribes (about 8.5% of the population)

The Indian Muslims (14.2%), and Christians (2.3%) often function as castes.

Official lists are compiled by states recognizing the OBC, Scheduled Castes and the Scheduled Tribes. The dividing lines can be ambiguous, several castes have demanded a lower rank so that they can avail the privileges offered. The term upper caste also refers to forward castes, when news reports refer to the Scheduled Castes in relation to the two upper groups.

=== Delhi ===
- Yadav
- Jats
- Gurjar
- Tyagi
- Rajputs
- Brahmins
- Punjabis

=== Haryana ===
- Yadav
- Gujjar
- Brahmin (Brahmin belt of Haryana)
- Jats, 25% of state's population
- Saini
- Jangid
- Rajputs

=== Gujarat ===
- Kolis
- Patidar, 13% of state's population

=== Andhra Pradesh, Telangana ===
- Kamma, 5% of state's population
- Reddy, 8% of state's population
- Kapu

=== Bihar ===
- Kurmi
- Yadav
- Dusadh
- Kushwaha/Koeri
- Brahmins (Maithils)
- Rajput
- Bhumihar

=== Uttar Pradesh ===
- Gujjar
- Yadav, 8.7% of state's population
- Rajput
- Bhumihar
- Brahmin
- Kurmi
- Chamars/Jatav, 9.9% of state's population
- Koeri

=== Jammu & Kashmir ===
- Muslims Gujjars
- Brahmin Sikhs
- Dogra Brahmins and Rajputs

=== West Bengal ===
- Muslims
- Mahishya, largest caste of Bengal forming around a quarter of province's Hindu population
- Rajbanshi, largest SC community of West Bengal, mainly concentrated in Coochbehar district
- Namasudra/Matua
- Gorkha

=== Karnataka ===
- Lingayat/Veerashaiva, dominates in North Karnataka and Central Karnataka and some parts in Southern Karnataka, forms 15.3% of state's population.
- Vokkaliga/Gowda dominates in Old Mysuru region/Southern Karnataka especially in Mandya, Hassan and Bangalore, forms 10.8% of state's population.
- Kuruba
- AHINDA (Kannada acronym for minorities, backward classes and Dalits) or MOD (Muslims, OBCs and Dalits) in Bidar, Kalaburgi and Chamarajanagara.

=== Kerala ===
- Ezhava
- Mapilla
- Nair
- Saint Thomas Christian

=== Tamil Nadu ===
- Chettiar
- Mudaliar
- Vanniyar
- Kongu Vellalar
- Nadar
- Mukkulathor Thevar
- Devendrakula Velalar
- Reddiar

=== Punjab ===
- Bhuee
- Dalits
- Brahmins and Khatris
- Saini
- Jat Sikhs, who tend to support Akali Dal (Badal)

=== Rajasthan ===
- Jats
- Yadav
- Gujjar
- Jangid
- Meenas
- Rajputs
- Brahmin

=== Maharashtra ===
- Dhangar
- Kunbi (sub caste of Maratha), Maratha, 31.2% of state's population
- Mahar
- Malis
- Brahmin

=== Odisha ===
- Yadav
- Brahmin
- Karan
- Khandayat, Chasa

=== Madhya Pradesh ===
- Gujjars
- Yadav
- Kurmis
- Rajputs
- Brahmins

== Controversial issues ==
=== SC/ST Reservation system ===
In 1954, the Ministry of Education suggested that 20 per cent of places should be reserved for the SCs and STs in educational institutions with a provision to relax minimum qualifying marks for admission by 5 per cent wherever required. In 1982, it was specified that 15 per cent and 7.5 per cent of vacancies in public sector and government-aided educational institutes should be reserved for the SC and ST candidates, respectively.

=== OBC Reservation system ===
The Mandal Commission, or the Socially Backward Classes Commission (SEBC), was established in India on 1 January 1979 by the Janata Party government under Prime Minister Morarji Desai with a mandate to "identify the socially or educationally backward classes" of India. It was headed by the late B.P. Mandal an Indian parliamentarian, to consider the question of reservations for people to redress caste discrimination, and used eleven social, economic, and educational indicators to determine backwardness. In 1980, based on its rationale that OBCs ("Other backward classes") identified on the basis of caste, economic and social indicators comprised 52% of India's population, the commission's report recommended that members of Other Backward Classes (OBC) be granted reservations to 27 per cent of jobs under the Central government and public sector undertakings, thus making the total number of reservations for SC, ST and OBC to 49%.

Though the report had been completed in 1983, the V.P. Singh government declared its intent to implement the report in August 1990, leading to widespread student protests. It was thereafter provided a temporary stay order by the Supreme court, but implemented in 1992 in the central government.

The commission estimated that 52% of the total population of India (excluding SCs and STs), belonging to 3,743 different castes and communities, were 'backward'. The number of backward castes in Central list of OBCs increased to 5,013 (without the figures for most of the Union Territories) in 2006 as per the National Commission for Backward Classes.

== See also ==
- Caste system in India
- Identity politics
- KHAM theory
- Luv-Kush equation
