= Mahtawas =

- village
- Location in Rajasthan, India
- Coordinates: 28°08′04″N 76°24′47″E
- Country: India
- State: Rajasthan
- District: Alwar
- Elevation: 273 m (896 ft)

Population (2011)
  - Total: 3,401

Languages
  - Official: Hindi
- Time zone: UTC+5:30 (IST)
- PIN: 301704
- Telephone code: 01494
- Vehicle registration: RJ02
- Nearest city: Rewari
- Lok Sabha constituency: Alwar
- Vidhan Sabha constituency: Neemrana
- Sex ratio: 1:1 ♂/♀
- Literacy: 84.74%

Mahtawas is a village in Neemrana tehsil, Alwar district, Rajasthan state, India. It is a part of the National Capital Region.

== Location ==
Mahtawas is a village and gram panchayat (a local administrative unit) located in the Alwar district of Rajasthan, India. It located in the UTC 5.30 time zone and it follows Indian Standard Time. The state capital of Jaipur is around 174 kilometres (108 mi) distant and the village lies 1.5 kilometres (0.93 mi) from the southern border of Haryana. Ateli is towards west, Neemrana towards the south, and Bawal and Rewari towards the east.

== Transport ==
=== Air ===
The nearest airport is Indira Gandhi International Airport, New Delhi, 98.8 km away and second nearest airport is Sanganer International Airport, Jaipur is 173 km from Mahtawas. There are an airstrip located at Bhilwara village 20 km away from Mahtawas used as a flying club.

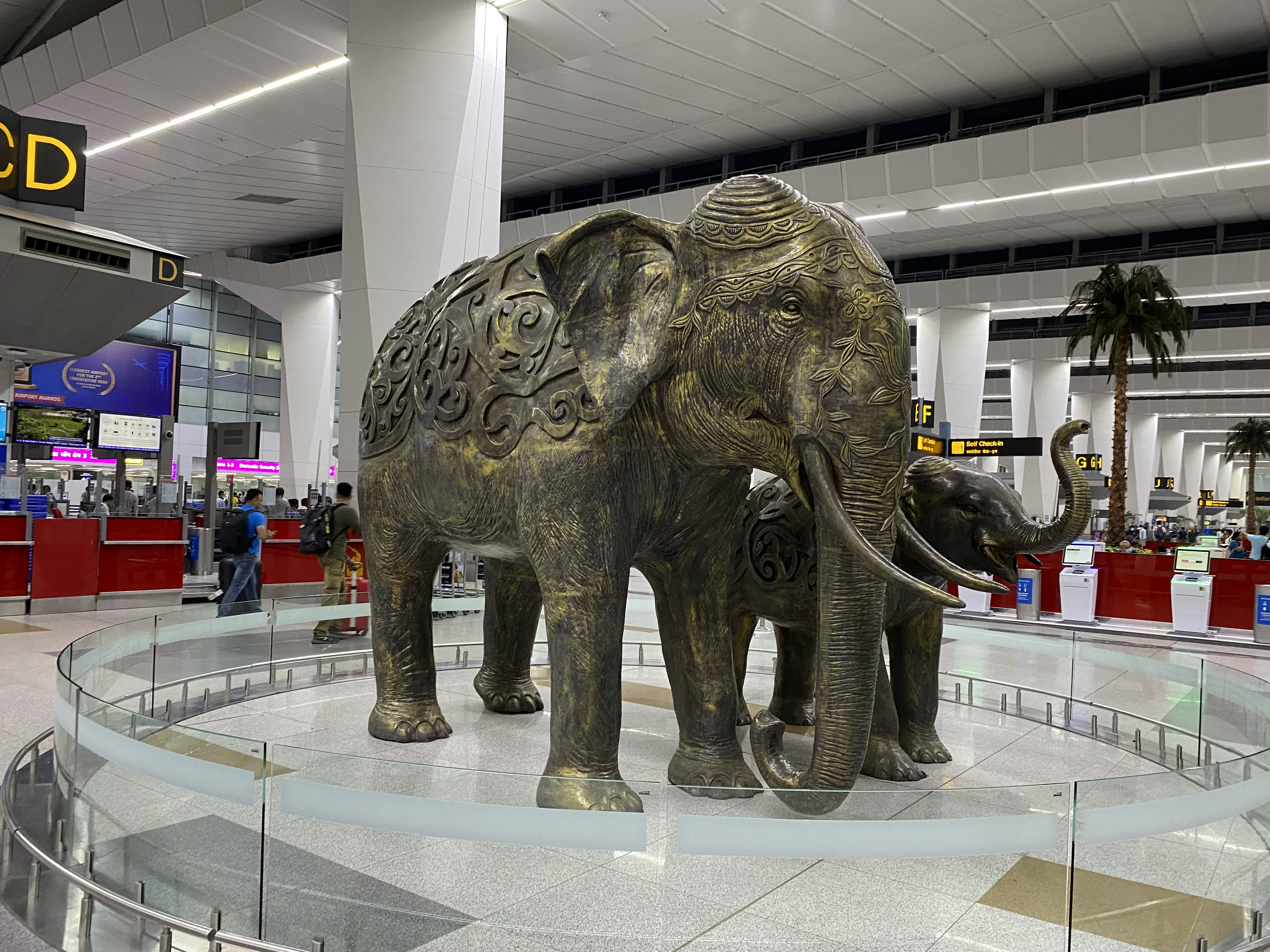
Indira Gandhi International Airport T3 Welcome Area

=== Railway ===
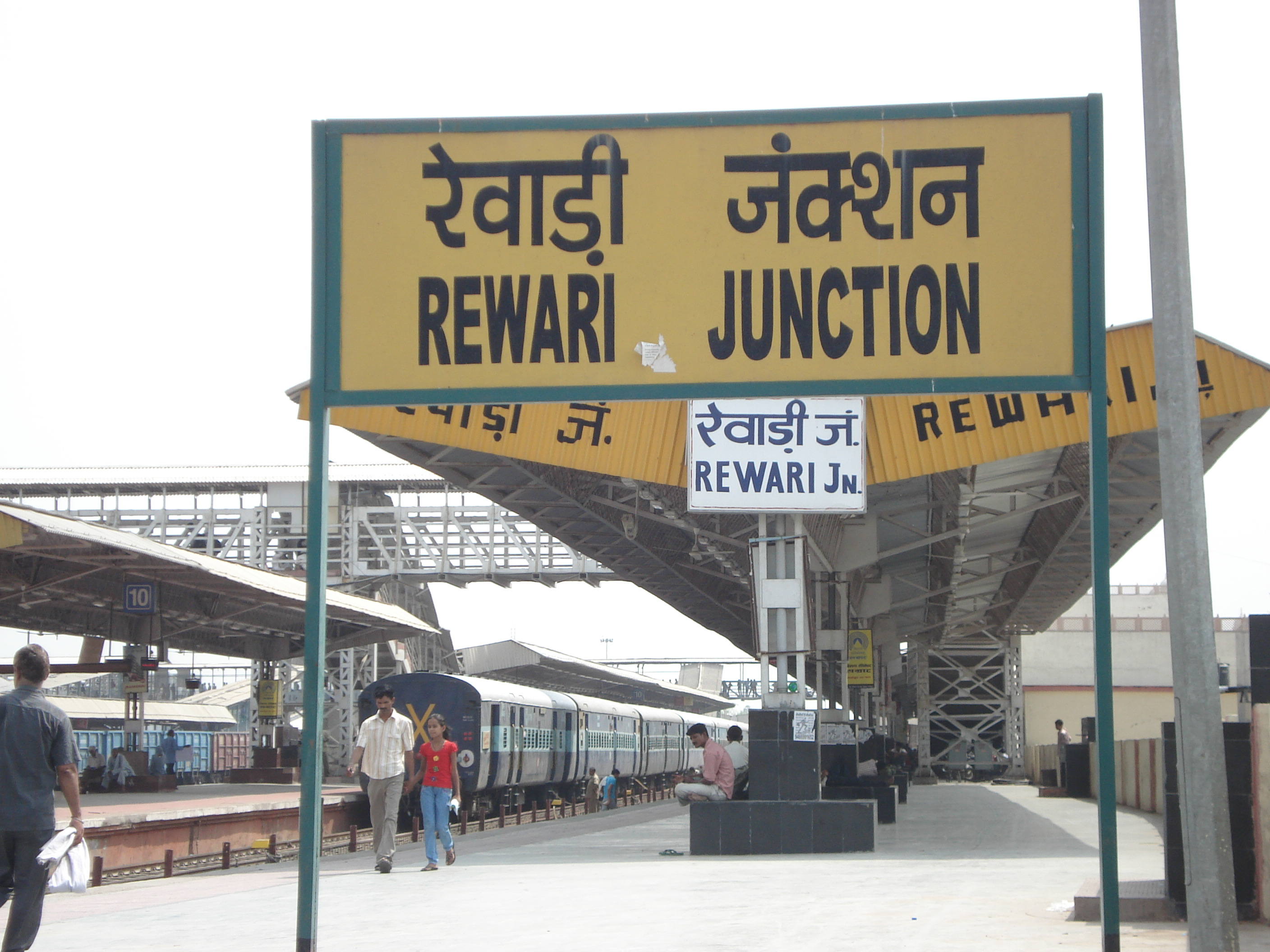
Rewari Railway Station

The nearest main railway station is Rewari. Rewari is a major junction of the Indian railway network and has connections to major cities in India by direct trains. Six railway lines branch out from it to Delhi, Ajmer via Ringas, Ajmer via Alwar, Loharu, Hisar and Rohtak.

There are no main road in village. Only one road is away 5 km from VILLAGE KUND-BEHROR ROAD.

== Demographics ==
Total population of Mahtawas are 3401 and the village today comprises 547 Hindu families; the few Muslim villagers left around 1947. There are 1617 males and 1430 females, according to the 2011 Census of India, including 354 children up to the age of six. The sex ratio is .884, which is lower than the state average of .928., and the child sex ratio is .744 compared to an average of.888 for the state as a whole.

Mahtawas has a higher literacy rate than the state average. In 2011, this was 84.74 per cent, compared to 66.11 per cent for Rajasthan. Male literacy stands at 93.78 per cent while female literacy rate is 74.75 per cent. Yadav Caste of Lohtiya Gotra constitute 60 per cent and Brahmin are 15 per cent and Kumhar, jangid are 5 per cent and Scheduled Castes constitute 20.25 per cent of the population; there are no Scheduled Tribe members.

== Work Profile ==
In Mahtawas village out of total population, 1605 were engaged in work activities. 73.08% of workers describe their work as Main Work (Employment or Earning more than 6 Months) while 26.92% were involved in Marginal activity providing livelihood for less than 6 months. Of 1605 workers engaged in Main Work, 700 were cultivators (owner or co-owner) while 84 were Agricultural labourer.

== Politics ==
The gram panchayat is the most powerful political body at village level and it also governs the village of Adind. In turn, the gram panchayat operates under the aegis of the Neemrana Panchayat Samiti. Currently the Sarpanch of Mahtawas is Rampal Yadav Mahtawas falls under the Alwar constituency for the purpose of elections to the Lok Sabha of the Indian parliament. For elections to the Vidhan Sabha, which is the state legislative assembly, the constituency of Neemrana applies. Until 2013 it was falling under Behror legislative assembly seat. As of 2015, both the national- and state-level constituencies are held by representatives of the Bhartiya Janta Party.

== Delhi-Mumbai industrial corridor ==
The Delhi Mumbai Industrial Corridor Project will link Mahtawas to Delhi and Mumbai via Neemrana and Rewari. It is an industrial development project of the Government of India and aims to develop an Industrial Zone spanning across six states.

== Climate ==
Mahtawas has a dry, semi-arid climate. The mean minimum and maximum temperature range from 6 °C to 41 °C during January (winter) and May–June (summer) respectively. The summer temperature can go up to 46 °C from May to July. Winter is from November to February and the temperature can fall to 2 °C in December and January. The temperature was recorded as 0 °C on 12 January 2012 and 31 January 2012. Rain falls from July to September. A little rain is experienced during winter also. Average annual rainfall in Mahtawas is 553 millimetres (21.8 in).

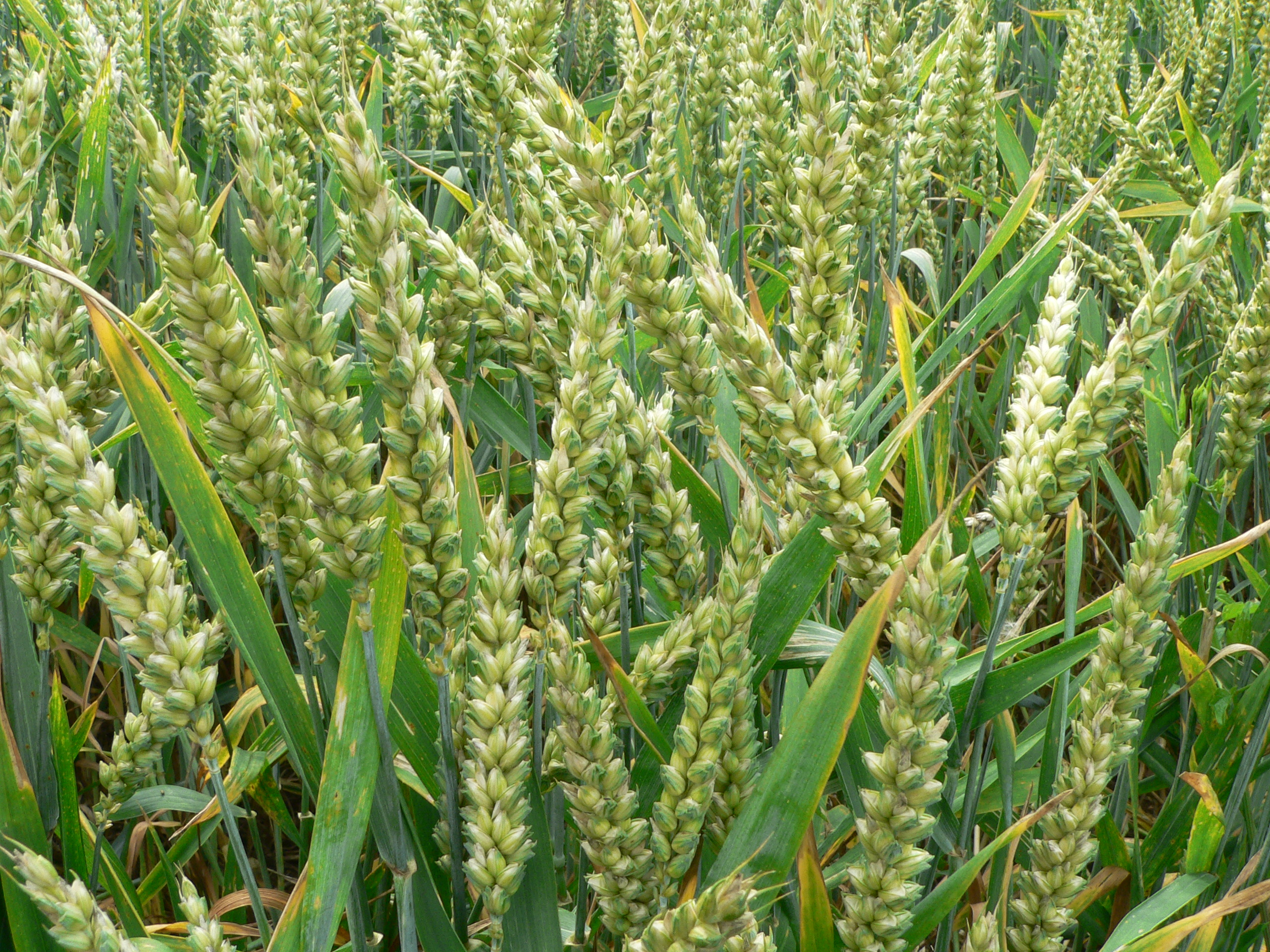
Wheat

== Culture ==
Village culture is very much influenced by that of the Rajasthan. RAJASTHANI is the main spoken language and is close to the RAJASTHANI language.

The Hindu population celebrate all Hindu festivals and rituals, among which Deepawali, Holi and the annual fairs are among the most anticipated.
