= Khaparde =

Khaparde is a surname. Notable people with the surname include:

- G. S. Khaparde (1854–1938), Indian lawyer
- D. K. Khaparde (1939–2000), Indian activist
- Balkrishna Ganesh Khaparde (1882–1968), Indian politician
