= Ahinda =

Kannada acronym: minorities, backward classes, Dalits

Ahinda (a Kannada acronym for Alpasankhyataru or minorities, Hindulidavaru or other backward classes, and Dalitaru or Dalits) is a political terminology coined by the Karnataka state's first backward leader Devraj Urs, AHINDA has been reinvigorated by Siddaramaiah.

There are two explanations regarding the motives behind Ahinda. Firstly, it is a challenge to the continuing dominant caste hegemony in Karnataka politics. Secondly, it is a non-political social movement aimed at pursuing the cause of social justice to the oppressed classes.

The religious minorities, Dalit and Adivasis constitute 39% of the state’s population – Muslims and Christians (14.79%), Scheduled Castes (17.14%) and Scheduled Tribes (6.95%) and thus they form a significant electorate within the state. However political alignment is not along demographic lines because of the inherent political differences between Chalavadi and Madiga sub groups within Scheduled Castes.

== See also ==
- Caste politics
- Bahujan
