= D. K. Khaparde =

D. K. Khaparde (13 May 1939, Nagpur, – 29 February 2000, Pune) was an Indian activist and a founder of the precursor to BAMCEF in 1971 and later the president of BAMCEF.

A Mahar Buddhist, after completion of his B.Sc. from Institute of Science at Nagpur, Khaparde joined the Defence Establishment of Pune. In Pune, he met Kanshi Ram, whom he enlightened about the movement of Ambedkarism, philosophy of B. R. Ambedkar.

The crises on the issue of Jayanti celebration of B. R. Ambedkar in the Defence establishment galvanised the followers of Ambedkar. They decided to form a nationwide organisation to spread the movement of Phule-Ambedkar and formed BAMCEF on 6 December 1978.

Kanshi Ram left him in 1985 and therefore he had registered BAMCEF in 1987 in consultation with other colleagues. He resigned from the service and dedicated completely for 13 years and established BAMCEF offices in 18 states of India]to spread Phule-Ambedkar movement. It is said that Kanshi Ram wanted to make BAMCEF enter into the political sphere but Khaparde wanted it to remain a social organization hence there were conflicts.
