= Waman Meshram =

Indian workers activist (born 1957)

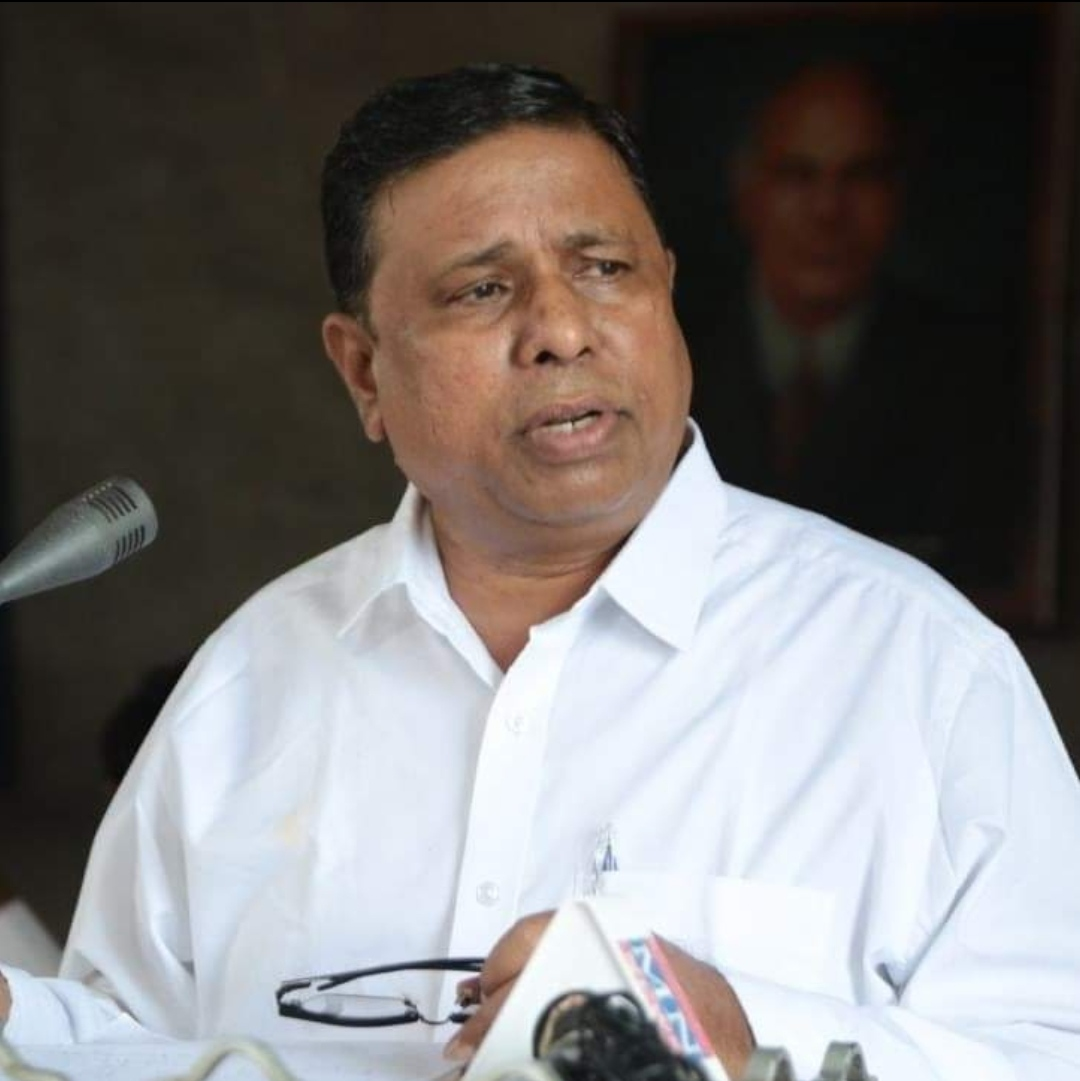
- Born: 1957 (age 68–69); Ramgaon, Yavatmal, Maharashtra, India
- Organisation(s): Bharat Mukti Morcha, Bahujan Kranti Morcha
- Website: wamanmeshram.com

Waman Chindhuji Meshram (born 1957) is an Indian activist.

== Early life ==
Meshram was born in Ramgaon village, located in Darwha Tehsil of Yavatmal district in Maharashtra in 1957. Waman Meshram took his primary and secondary school education in Darwha. After this he went to Aurangabad for further education. Waman Meshram started contemplating to join public life when he still was in Baba Saheb Ambedkar college at Aurangabad in the early 1970s.

== Career ==
In 1975 Meshram joined BAMCEF. BAMCEF was founded by Kanshi Ram. Kanshi Ram organised Scheduled Caste and Backward Class by raising slogans against forward caste. The organisation works for oppressed communities such Scheduled Caste, Scheduled Tribe, Other Backward Class and Minority (Muslim). According to him, the organisation work for Mulnivasi and against Brahminism. BAMCEF target Brahmin in various programmes. In his various speeches, he criticises Hindu gods and goddesses.

=== Movement against EVM ===
Waman Meshram started people's movement against EVM in 2014 itself. He and his organisation Bharat Mukti Morcha(BMM) launched a five-phased protest campaign across the country from March 2017 demanding for discontinuing electronic voting machines (EVMs) in the electoral process in India.

Addressing a press conference in March 2017, Waman Meshram said, "Using EVMs is the worst practice in the electoral process in the world. We will continue to fight against EVMs till their usage is stopped." Meshram stated that he had filed a petition against the Election Commission of India(EC) asking it to attach Voter-Verified Paper Audit Trail (VVPAT) in the EVMs but it is being delayed deliberately. Delaying this is going to only help two organizations, political parties. If we want to keep the democracy of our country alive, ballet papers must be used for election as they cannot be rigged," he added. Talking about the petition filled in the Supreme Court, Meshram said, "I had filed a case of contempt of court against Election Commission of India (EC). The apex court in its verdict of 8 October 2013, had clearly said that EVM machines can be fixed or rigged, so as a hard proof VVPAT machines must be attached to EVMs but the guidelines have not followed." In 2014 and 2019 Election his party contested on many seats but lost deposits on almost all the seats. Meshram also alleged that the Election Commission of India (EC) has been pressured by the Central government to rig elections across the country. "The election commission in a reply to my letter said that the Central government is not providing funds to attach VVPAT machines, but the EC is an autonomous institution. It should have gone to the President or held a press conference as the citizens have the right to know," he said.

== Criticism ==
In June 2022, Naveen Jaihind an organization burnt effigy of Waman Meshram in Rohtak, Haryana for giving statement against Hindu gods and Brahmin.
