= BAMCEF =

Organization

- The All India Backward And Minority Communities Employees Federation
- Formation: 6 December 1978 (47 years ago)
- Founder: Kanshi Ram
- Founded at: BAMCEF
- Type: Social organization of educated employees
- President: Waman Meshram

The All India Backward and Minority Communities Employees Federation, abbreviated as BAMCEF, is an organisation for employees of oppressed communities that was established in 1971 by Kanshi Ram, D. K. Khaparde, and Dinabhana.

BAMCEF started at a convention held in Delhi in 1978, with an official launch on 6 December 1978, the death anniversary of B. R. Ambedkar. The goal of BAMCEF is to establish a society and the nation on the values of Equality , Freedom, Fraternity and Justice.

== History ==
As an employee of the Defence Research and Development Laboratory in Pune, Kanshi Ram realized that the formation of a Scheduled Castes and Scheduled Tribes bureaucracy was important to serve depressed class's interests. He set about forming a federation, through which he worked his way up the bureaucratic hierarchy. By identifying a few zealous officers, he was able to influence lower-ranked staff.

The motto of this organisation is to 'Change the System', to inspire the SC/ST/OBC and Minority bureaucrats to do their bit for the moolnivasi (SC/ST/OBC and Minority) masses. In this way, a continuous supply of intellectual property, money and talent was ensured. Ram did not want to make BAMCEF an employees' union. He wanted it to become an organisation of educated Bahujan employees: "the think tank, talent bank, and financial bank of the Bahujan samaj.

BAMCEF raised funds to promote their agenda and for training. Kanshi Ram appointed state-level conveners as well as mandal conveners to act as links between state and district levels. Suryakant Waghmore says it appealed to "the class among the indigenous moolnivasi bahujans that was comparatively well-off, mostly based in urban areas and small towns working as government servants and partially alienated from their untouchable identities".

Others established the Dalit Shoshit Samaj Sangharsh Samiti (DS4) in 1981. This organization made an impact on people in North and South India. Later, this group was led by Ishaan Singh Tomar. Before the formation of the Bahujan Samaj Party (BSP), DS4 entered local elections in Delhi and Haryana in the name of "Limited Political Action". Later on, Ram dissolved DS4 and formed BSP as a completely political wing. This caused strain within BAMCEF ranks.

In early 1986, BAMCEF split. Kanshi Ram announced that he was no longer willing to work for any organisation other than BSP. One element of BAMCEF, which was associated with Kanshi Ram, became a shadow organisation to help BSP in electoral mobilisation. Those remaining in BAMCEF after Ram's departure registered BAMCEF as an independent non-political organisation in 1987.D.K. Khaparde became 2nd president of BAMCEF until his death in the year 2000.Waman Meshram was presided as the 3rd president of BAMCEF in the year 2000.

The current national president of BAMCEF is Waman Meshram.

=== Controversy ===
The organization has been under scanner of Maharashtra police for spreading conspiracy of history by publishing videos on YouTube claiming Chhatrapati Sambhaji Maharaj was killed by Brahmin Nanasaheb Peshwa but in reality Sambhaji was killed by Aurangzeb which resulted in 2018 Bhima Koregaon violence in Maharashtra.
