= Kanshi Ram =

Indian politician and social reformer (1934–2006)

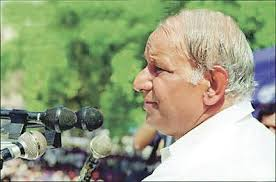
- Kanshi Ram at Lucknow, Uttar Pradesh

1st President of the Bahujan Samaj Party
- In office 14 April 1984 – 18 September 2003
- Preceded by: office established
- Succeeded by: Mayawati

Member of Parliament, Rajya Sabha
- In office 5 July 1998 – 4 July 2004
- Constituency: Uttar Pradesh

Member of Parliament, Lok Sabha
- In office 9 May 1996 – 4 December 1997
- Preceded by: Kamal Chaudhry
- Succeeded by: Kamal Chaudhry
- Constituency: Hoshiarpur
- In office 19 June 1991 – 9 May 1996
- Preceded by: Ram Singh Shakya
- Succeeded by: Ram Singh Shakya
- Constituency: Etawah

Personal details
- Born: 15 March 1934 Rupnagar, Punjab, British India
- Died: 9 October 2006 (aged 72) New Delhi, India
- Party: Bahujan Samaj Party
- Website: Kansi Ram Official Website

Kanshi Ram (15 March 1934 – 9 October 2006), also known as Bahujan Nayak or Manyavar, Sahab Kanshiram was an Indian politician and social reformer who worked for the upliftment and political mobilisation of the Bahujans, the backward or lower caste people including untouchable groups at the bottom of the caste system in India. Towards this end, Kanshi Ram founded Dalit Shoshit Samaj Sangharsh Samiti (DS-4), the All India Backwards (SC/ST/OBC) and Minorities Communities Employees' Federation (BAMCEF) in 1971 and the Bahujan Samaj Party (BSP) in 1984. In 2003, he ceded leadership of the BSP to his protégé Mayawati who has served four terms as Chief Minister of Uttar Pradesh.

== Early life ==
Kanshi Ram was born on 15 March 1934 into a Ramdasia Sikh family of Chamar caste in Pirthipur Bunga village, near Khawaspur, Ropar district, (Note: Ropar district is now known as Roopnagar and lies midway between Chandigarh and Jalandhar. Kanshiram's ancestral home is Khawaspur village. The local dalits call his house 'Chann Sahib', 'chann' meaning house and 'sahib' being a mark of respect.) Punjab, British India. Significantly, he was not subjected to much social discrimination during his childhood or youth. As reason for the comparative absence of social discrimination in Kanshi Ram's early years is because he belonged to a Sikh family. Kanshi Ram referred to this in a later interview to French political scientist Christophe Jaffrelot saying, 'the teachings of the Sikh gurus were more egalitarian' and that 'converted Chamars at least had some upward mobility.' As a young Sikh from a family of soldiers, he was largely unaware about his caste while in school or in a college in Punjab.

After studies at various local schools, Ram graduated in 1956 with a BSc degree from Government College Ropar.

== Career ==
Kanshi Ram joined the offices of the Explosive Research and Development Laboratory in Pune. It was at this time that he first experienced caste discrimination and in 1964 he became an activist. Those who admire him point out that he was spurred to this after reading B. R. Ambedkar's book Annihilation of Caste and witnessing the discrimination against a Dalit employee who wished to observe a holiday celebrating Ambedkar's birth. Kanshi Ram was strongly inspired by B. R. Ambedkar and his philosophy.

Ram initially supported the Republican Party of India (RPI) but became disillusioned with its co-operation with the Indian National Congress. In 1971, he founded the All India SC, ST, OBC and Minority Employees Association and in 1978 this became BAMCEF, an organisation that aimed to persuade educated members of the Scheduled Castes, Scheduled Tribes, Other Backwards Classes and Minorities to support Ambedkarite principles. BAMCEF was neither a political nor a religious body and it also had no aims to agitate for its purpose. Suryakant Waghmore says it appealed to "the class among the Dalits that was comparatively well-off, mostly based in urban areas and small towns working as government servants and partially alienated from their untouchable identities".

Later, in 1981, Ram formed another social organisation known as Dalit Shoshit Samaj Sangharsh Samiti (DSSSS, or DS4). He started his attempt of consolidating the Dalit vote and in 1984 he founded the Bahujan Samaj Party (BSP). He fought his first election in 1984 from Janjgir-Champa seat in Chhattisgarh. The BSP found success in Uttar Pradesh, initially struggled to bridge the divide between Dalits and Other Backward Classes but later under leadership of Mayawati bridged this gap.

In 1982, he published his only book The Chamcha Age, on the fiftieth anniversary of the Poona Pact. He dedicated the book to Jyotirao Phule, B. R. Ambedkar, Periyar, and 'many other rebellious spirits' who worked for Dalit emancipation. In the Poona Pact, Ambedkar who had worked hard to earn separate electorates from the British, had to surrender the possibility due to Mahatma Gandhi's fast unto death. Ambedkar feared the possible consequences to the nascent Dalit movement if he had not. Ram believed that the separate electorates would have provided the Dalits autonomy and authority; it would have undermined the power of the upper castes who constituted a relatively smaller population. Ram argued that Gandhi manipulated Ambedkar into signing the pact, and implied a defeat for the Dalits. This directly led to The Chamcha (stooge) Age, where Dalit leaders were made stooges of the upper caste. Dalit electorates had little say in getting their representatives elected even in seats reserved for them. Ram used the term to describe Dalit leaders such as Jagjivan Ram and Ram Vilas Paswan. He argued that Dalits should work politically for their own ends rather than compromise by working with other parties. Opportunist mobilization of a section of Dalits in the chamcha age thus produces, what Kanshi Ram calls, an 'alienation of the elite'. The Dalit elite could overcome this alienation by 'payback to the oppressed and exploited society'.

After forming BSP, Ram said the party would fight first election to lose, next to get noticed and the third election to win. In 1988, he contested in Allahabad against a future Prime Minister V. P. Singh and performed impressively but lost polling close to 70,000 votes.

He unsuccessfully contested from East Delhi (Lok Sabha constituency) (against HKL Bhagat) and Amethi (Lok Sabha constituency) (against Rajiv Gandhi) in 1989 and came in the third position on both the seats. Then he represented the 11th Lok Sabha (1996–1998) from Hoshiarpur, Kanshiram was also elected as member of Lok Sabha from Etawah in Uttar Pradesh.

After the demolition of the Babri Masjid in 1992, Mulayam Singh Yadav and Kanshi Ram joined hands to keep communal forces out of power by creating unity among the backward and Dalit castes and giving the popular slogan "Mile Mulayam-Kanshi Ram, Hawa mein ud gaye Jai Shri Ram" (When Mulayam and Kanshiram come together, Jai Shri Ram vanishes). After the election, a coalition government of Samajwadi Party and Bahujan Samaj Party was formed in UP under the leadership of Mulayam Singh Yadav, although due to some differences and Mayawati's ambition, this alliance broke up in June 1995, Mayawati became first time Chief Minister of Uttar Pradesh in support of BJP. In the late 1990s, Ram described the BJP as the most corrupt (mahabrasht) party in India and the Indian National Congress, Samajwadi Party and Janata Dal as equally corrupt. In 2001, he declared Mayawati as his successor.

== Proposed conversion to Buddhism ==
In 2002, Ram announced his intention to convert to Buddhism on 14 October 2006, the 50th anniversary of Ambedkar's conversion. He intended for 50,000,000 of his supporters to convert at the same time. Part of the significance of this plan was that Ram's followers include not only untouchables, but persons from a variety of castes, who could significantly broaden Buddhism's support. However, he and his successor Mayawati decided to convert to Buddhism when BSP will form the absolute government in some states and government at the centre.

Mayawati his successor said "Saheb Kanshi Ram and I had decided that we will convert and adopt Buddhism when we will get 'absolute majority' at the centre. We wanted to do this because we can make a difference to the religion by taking along with us millions of people. If we convert without power then only we two will be converting. But when you have power you can really create a stir".

== Death ==
Kanshi Ram was a diabetic. He suffered a heart attack in 1994, an arterial clot in his brain in 1995, and a paralytic stroke in 2003. He died in New Delhi on 9 October 2006 of a severe heart attack at the age of 72. He had been virtually bed-ridden for more than two years. According to his wishes, his funeral rites were performed according to Buddhist tradition, with Mayawati lighting the pyre. His ashes were placed in an urn and kept at Prerna Sthal, where many people paid their respects.

In his condolence message, Indian Prime Minister Manmohan Singh described Ram as "one of the greatest social reformers of our time.. his political ideas and movements had a significant impact on our political evolution... He had a larger understanding of social change and was able to unite various underprivileged sections of our society and provide a political platform where their voices would be heard." Under Ram's leadership, the BSP won 14 parliamentary seats in the 1999 parliamentary elections.

== Books ==
In 1982, Kanshi Ram wrote The Chamcha Age (The Era of the Stooges), a book in which he used the term chamcha (stooge) for Dalit leaders who he alleged had selfish reasons to work for parties such as the Indian National Congress (INC) and Bharatiya Janata Party (BJP). His book Birth of BAMCEF was also published. His biography, Kanshiram: Leader of the Dalits was written by Badri Narayan Tiwari. His speeches are compiled in books like Bahujan Nayak Kanshiram Ke Avismarniya Bhashan by Anuj Kumar, Writings & Speeches of Kanshiram compiled by S. S. Gautam & A.R. Akela and The Editorials of Kanshi Ram by Bahujan Samaj Publications in 1997.

== Legacy ==
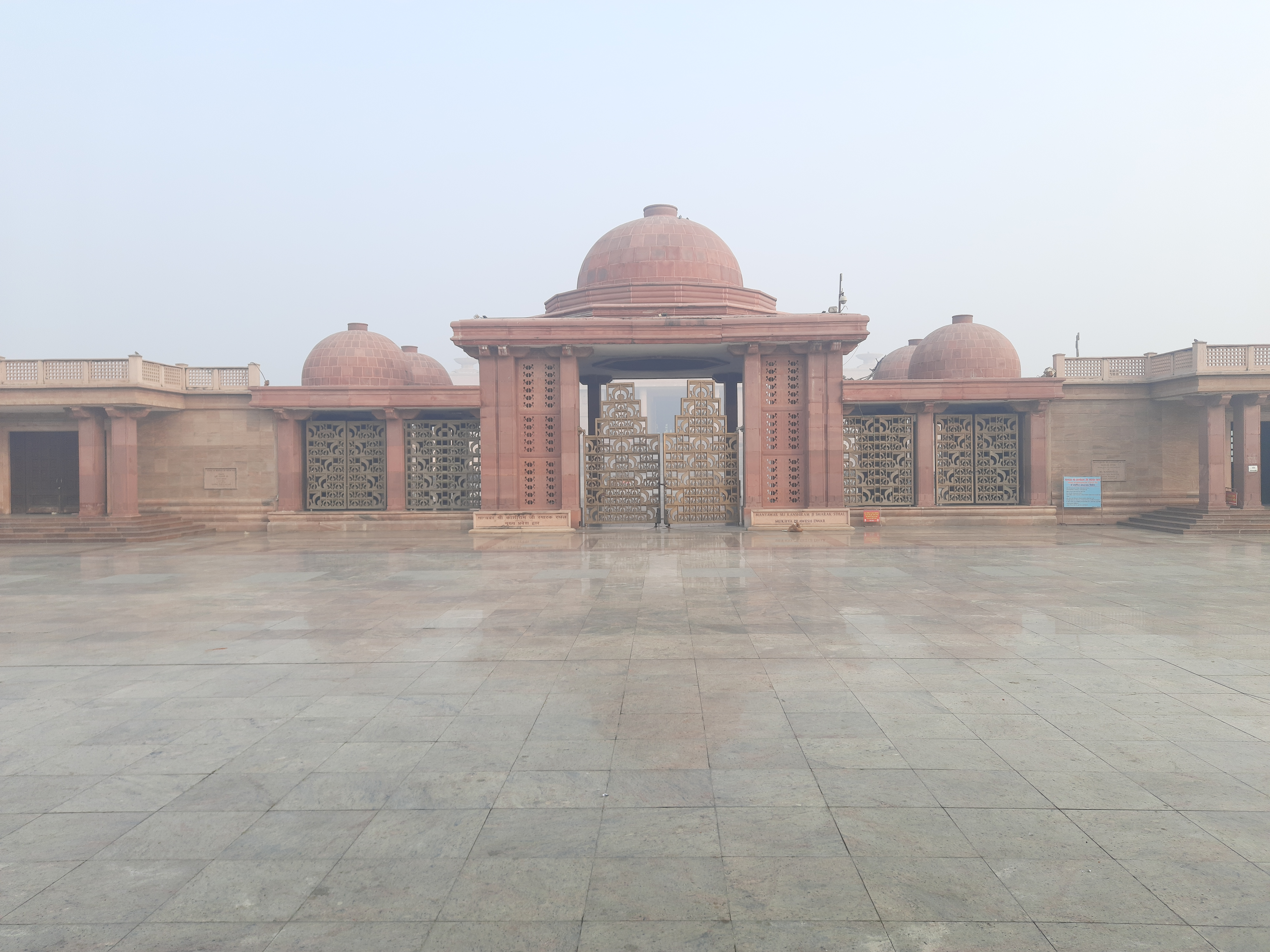
Kanshi Ram's memorial at Manyawar Shri Kanshiram Ji Green Eco Garden

There are many government programmes and schemes and public institutions named after Kanshi Ram in Uttar Pradesh. His birthplace Pirthipur Bunga Sahib has a memorial with his statue. Manyawar Shri Kanshiram Ji Green Eco Garden in Lucknow has been named in his memory.

== Biopic ==
In 2017, a Hindi-language Biopic film The Great Leader Kanshiram was released in India, directed and produced by Arjun Singh, based on the story of DS4, BAMCEF and Bahujan Samaj Party founder Kanshi Ram from his childhood to 1984.

== See also ==
- Ravidassia
- List of Jatav
- Bahujan Samaj Party
- Ramdasia Sikh
- Chandrashekhar Azad
- Bhim Army
- Azad Samaj Party (Kanshi Ram)

== Notes ==
=== Bibliography ===
- Narayan, Badri (2014). Kanshiram: Leader of the Dalits. Penguin UK. ISBN 978-9351186700.
