= Dalit Shoshit Samaj Sangharsh Samiti =

- Abbreviation: DS4
- Founder: Kanshi Ram
- Founded: 6 December 1981 (44 years ago)
- Preceded by: BAMCEF
- Succeeded by: Bahujan Samaj Party

The Dalit Shoshit Samaj Sangharsh Samiti, abbreviated as DS4 or DSSSS (lit. "Dalit and other Exploited Groups Struggle Committee") was founded in 1981 by Kanshi Ram to organise Dalits and other marginalised groups of India.

== Origins ==
Kanshi Ram started the Dalit Shoshit Samaj Sangharsh Samiti (DS4 or DSSSS) on 6 December 1981 by Kanshi Ram to organise Dalits and other oppressed groups of India. The sociocultural organisation's slogan was "Brahmin, Thakur, Bania chhor, baaki sab hain DS4". ("Leaving Brahmins, Thakurs and Banias, everyone else is DS-4."). During the campaign for the 1993 UP Assembly elections, these derogatory slogans reached their zenith; the most notorious among them was: "Tilak, Tarazu Aur Talwar—Maro Unko Joote Char" (Tilak (Brahmin), Scales (Bania), Sword (Thakur) — Strike them four times with a shoe). With its forceful rhythm in Hindi, this slogan advocates that Brahmins, Baniyas, and Rajputs—each addressed by a derogatory epithet—be beaten four times with a shoe. This is a form of punishment traditionally considered deeply humiliating, as leather is deemed ritually impure. Although Kanshi Ram and Mayawati denied coining such slogans, they nevertheless continued to serve as a simple yet highly aggressive symbol reflecting the party's ideological stance.

== Works ==
A large number of singers from north India joined as volunteers in the organisation. Its cultural wing composed songs of resistance and created anti-caste consciousness.

In Punjab, siblings Ashok Kumar and Saroj Kumari were singers whose popularity extended to the neighbouring Himachal Pradesh. The brother-sister duo's songs of resistance versed the inhumane condition of Dalits and their aspirations, as well as critiqued the incumbent Indian National Congress party. Their songs channelised a constant shift from pain to resistance.

DS4 was related to BAMCEF. The organisation was absorbed by the Bahujan Samaj Party in 1984.
