= Bahujan Samaj Party =

Indian political party

- Abbreviation: BSP
- President: Mayawati
- General Secretary: Roop Chandra; Vishwanath Pal; Subhash Chaudhari; Munquad Ali; Mewalal Gautam
- Rajya Sabha Leader: Ramji Gautam
- Founder: Kanshi Ram
- Founded: 14 April 1984; 42 years ago
- Preceded by: Dalit Shoshit Samaj Sangharsh Samiti
- Headquarters: 12, Gurudwara Rakabganj Road, New Delhi, India-110001
- Newspaper: Paper Type Books Sometimes
- Ideology: Social justice; Self-Respect; Ambedkarism
- Political position: Centre-left
- Colours: Blue
- ECI status: National Party
- Alliance: Mahagathbandhan (1993–1995; 2018-2019); NDA (1995–2003); SAD+ (2022–2023) (Note: For 2022 Punjab Legislative Assembly election.); GGP (2023–2024) (Note: For 2023 Chhattisgarh Legislative Assembly election.); INLD+ (2023–2024) (Note: For 2024 Haryana Legislative Assembly election.)
- Seats in Rajya Sabha: 0 / 245
- Seats in Lok Sabha: 0 / 543
- Seats in State Legislative Council: 0 / 426
- Seats in State Legislative Assembly: 3 / 4,036 List 1 / 243 (Bihar) 1 / 117 (Punjab) 1 / 70 (Uttarakhand)
- Number of states and union territories in government: 0 / 31

Election symbol
- Elephant

Party flag
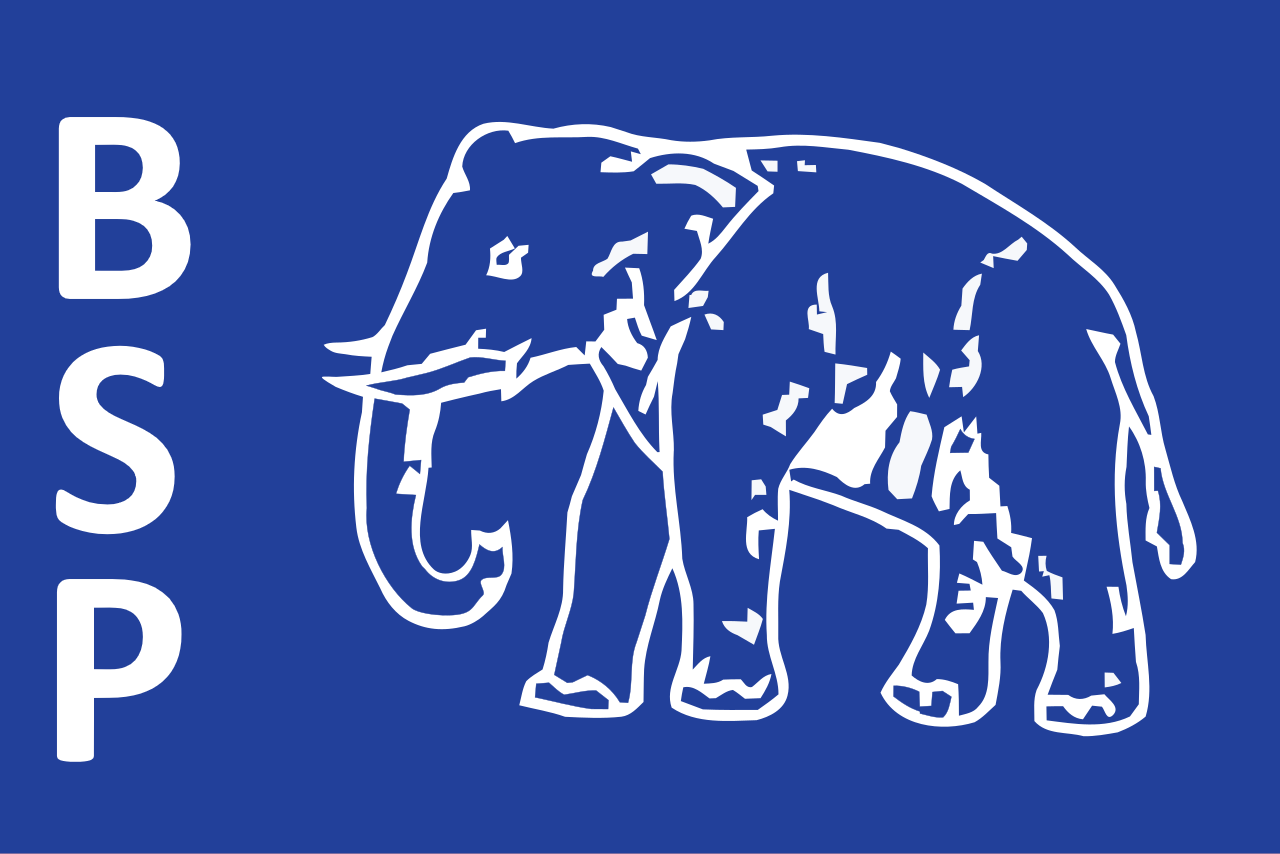

Website
- bahujansamajparty.net

The Bahujan Samaj Party (BSP) is a progressive political party in India that was formed to represent Bahujans (literally means "community in majority"), referring to the country's Scheduled Castes, Scheduled Tribes, and Other Backward Classes (OBC), along with minorities. According to Kanshi Ram, when he founded the party in 1984, the Bahujans comprised 85 percent of India's population, but were divided into 6,000 different castes. The party claims to be inspired by the philosophy of B. R. Ambedkar, Jyotirao Phule, Narayana Guru, Chhatrapati Shahuji Maharaj, and Gautama Buddha.

Kanshi Ram named his protégée, Mayawati, as his successor in 2001. The BSP has its main base in the Indian state of Uttar Pradesh where it was the second-largest party in the 2019 Indian general election with 19.3% of votes and fourth largest in the 2022 Uttar Pradesh Legislative Assembly election with 12.88% of votes. Its election symbol is an elephant which is also the symbol historically used by Dr. Ambedkar's Scheduled Castes Federation.

== Etymology ==
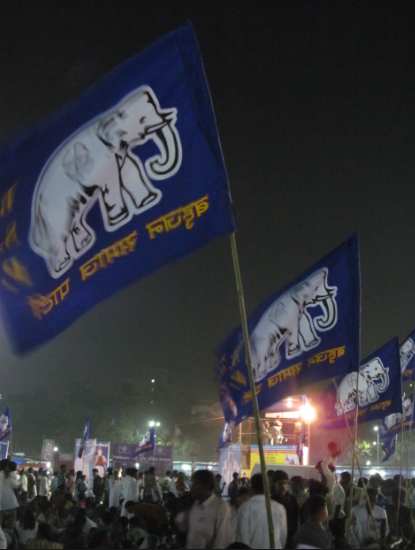
BSP rally in Mumbai

"Bahujan" is a Sanskritic term found in Hindu and Buddhist texts, and literally refers to "many people", or "the majority". It connotes the combined population of the Scheduled Castes and Scheduled Tribes, Other Backward Classes, Muslims, and minorities who together constitute the demographic majority of India. The word "Bahujan" appears in the dictum "Bahujana Hitaya Bahujana Sukhaya", or "The benefit and prosperity of the many", articulated by Gautama Buddha.

In his writing, Dr. B. R. Ambedkar used the term to refer to the majority of people in society that experienced discrimination and oppression on the basis of caste. Jyotirao Phule used the term in a similar context, and compared the Bahujans of India to Slavery in the United States. Schedule Caste and Bahujan writers have suggested this proportion was 70 percent of the population.

== History ==
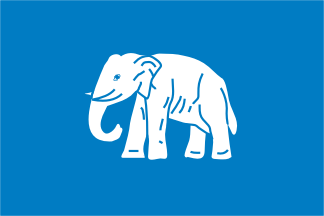
Bahujan Samaj Party flag used in public

Bahujan Samaj Party was founded on the birth anniversary of B. R. Ambedkar (14 April 1984) by Kanshi Ram, who named former school teacher, Mayawati, as his successor of BSP in 2001. The party's power grew quickly with seats in the Legislative Assembly of Uttar Pradesh and the Lok Sabha, the lower house of the Parliament of India. In 1993, following the assembly elections, Mayawati formed a coalition with Samajwadi Party president Mulayam Singh Yadav as Chief Minister. On 2 June 1995, she withdrew support from his government, which led to a major incident where Mulayam Singh Yadav was accused of sending his zealots to keep her party legislators hostage at a Lucknow guest house and shout casteist abuses at her. Since this incident, they have regarded each other publicly as chief rivals. Mayawati then obtained support from the Bharatiya Janata Party (BJP) to become Chief Minister on 3 June 1995. In October 1995, the BJP withdrew their support and fresh elections were called after a period of President's Rule. In 2003, Mayawati resigned from her own government to prove that she was not "hungry for power" and asked the BJP-run Government of India to remove Union Tourism and Culture Minister, Jagmohan. In 2007, she began leading a BSP-formed government with an absolute majority for a full five-year term.

On 14 April 2009, the Bahujan Samaj Party celebrated its silver jubilee. The Manywar Shri Kanshi Ramji Shahri Garib Awas Yojna housing scheme for the poor was launched by Lucknow Development Authority (LDA). The role of Mayawati was discussed in BSP's success. A mass rally was organised in Lucknow with 10000 police personnel on duty. It was the 305th and largest rally of BSP since 1984. As per Observer Research Foundation, within 25 years BSP became the third largest political party of India.

On 10 December 2023, Mayawati declared her nephew Akash Anand as the party's successor. However, he was sacked immediately after his comments on the ruling BJP party.

In recent years, the party has seen a decline in popularity in both state and national elections, with key figures within the BSP defecting and election results declining.

== Views ==
BSP believes in "Social Transformation and Economic Emancipation" of the "Bahujan Samaj". The Bahujan Samaj signifies the Bahujans as the Scheduled Castes (SC), the Scheduled Tribes (ST), and the Other Backward Castes (OBC). B. R. Ambedkar, a proponent of Bahujan rights, is their important ideological inspiration. The BSP also speaks in favor of religious minorities. The party claims not to be prejudiced against upper-caste Hindus. In 2008, while addressing the audience, Mayawati said: "Our policies and ideology are not against any particular caste or religion. If we were anti-upper caste, we would not have given tickets to candidates from upper castes to contest elections".

== List of chief ministers ==
=== Chief ministers of Uttar Pradesh ===
No	Image	Name	Constituency	Term of office		Tenure length	Assembly
1		Mayawati	None	3 June 1995	18 October 1995	137 days	12th Assembly (1993 election)
1		Mayawati	Harora	21 March 1997	21 September 1997	184 days	13th Assembly (1996 election)
1		Mayawati	Harora	3 May 2002	29 August 2003	1 year, 118 days	14th Assembly (2002 election)
1		Mayawati	MLC	13 May 2007	15 March 2012	4 years, 307 days	15th Assembly (2007 election)

== Electoral performances ==
=== Success in 2007 ===
The results of the May 2007 Uttar Pradesh state assembly election saw the BSP emerge as a sole majority party, the first to do so since 1991. Mayawati began her fourth term as Chief Minister of Uttar Pradesh and took her oath of office along with 50 ministers of cabinet and state rank on 13 May 2007, at Rajbhawan in the state capital of Lucknow. Most importantly, the majority achieved in large part was due to the party's ability to take away majority of upper castes votes from their traditional party, the BJP.

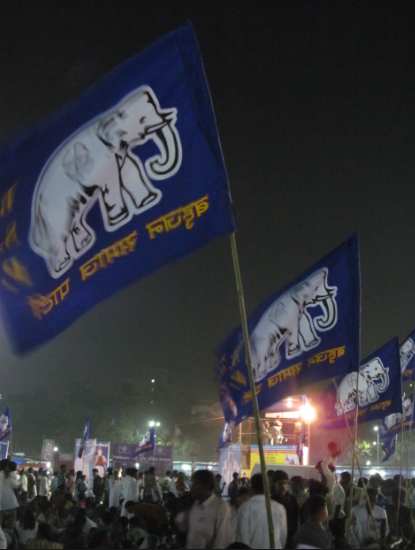
Flags of Bahujan Samaj Party at Shivaji Park, Mumbai

The party could manage only 80 seats in 2012, as opposed to 206 in 2007 assembly elections. BSP government was the first in the history of Uttar Pradesh to complete its full five-year term. On 26 May 2018, Ram Achal Rajbhar was replaced by R S Kushwaha as the president of UP unit.

=== 2014 Lok Sabha elections ===
The 2014 national Lok Sabha elections saw the BSP become the third-largest national party of India in terms of vote percentage, having 4.2% of the vote across the country but gaining no seats.

=== 2019 Lok Sabha elections: Mahagathbandhan ===
Prior to the 2019 Lok Sabha elections, BSP formed an alliance. The Mahagathbandhan (or Grand Alliance), or simply the Gathbandhan (Alliance), is an anti-Congress, anti-BJP Indian political alliance formed in the run-up to the 2019 general election under the leadership of two former Chief Ministers of Uttar Pradesh, Akhilesh Yadav of the Samajwadi Party and Mayawati of the Bahujan Samaj Party, along with Ajit Singh's Rashtriya Lok Dal and several other political parties, contesting in different states of India.

In Uttar Pradesh, BSP contested 38 seats, SP 37, and RLD 3, and the alliance supported Congress in the final two. Due to this seat sharing agreement, BSP's vote share fell slightly nationally and in the state, but they won 10 seats, up from 0 in 2014. The Samajwadi Party won 5 seats, giving the alliance a total of 15 seats out of 80 in the state.

=== 2024 Lok Sabha elections: Historic setback ===
On 19 July 2023, the BSP had announced that it would neither side with the INDIA nor the NDA and would go alone in the 2024 Indian General Election. However, it had its worst performance in a Lok Sabha election. It lost all ten of its seats in Uttar Pradesh that it had gained in the previous election and didn't gain any seats elsewhere. Its national vote share fell to 2.07%, less than half of what it was in 2014 when it also won 0 seats.

=== Lok Sabha ===
Lok Sabha term	Year	Seats contested	Seats won	± Seats	vote %	± vote %	State (seats)
9th	1989	245	4 / 543	▲4	2.07%	-	Punjab (1); UP (3)
10th	1991	231	3 / 543	▼1	1.61%	▼0.46%	MP (1); Punjab (1); UP (1)
11th	1996	210	11 / 543	▲8	4.02%	▲2.41%	MP (2); Punjab (3); UP (6)
12th	1998	251	5 / 543	▼6	4.67%	▲0.65%	Haryana (1); UP (4)
13th	1999	225	14 / 543	▲9	4.16%	▼0.49%	UP (14)
14th	2004	435	19 / 543	▲5	5.33%	▲1.17%	UP (19)
15th	2009	500	21 / 543	▲2	6.17%	▲0.84%	MP (1); UP (20)
16th	2014	503	0 / 543	▼21	4.19%	▼1.98%	—N/a
17th	2019	383	10 / 543	▲10	3.67%	▼0.52%	UP (10)
18th	2024	488	0 / 543	▼10	2.07%	▼1.6%	—N/a

All time-BSP Lok Sabha seat count

=== Legislative Assembly elections ===
Year	Seats contested	Seats won	±	Voteshare (%)	± (%)
Bihar Legislative Assembly
1990	164	0 / 324	Steady	0.73%	
1995	161	2 / 324	▲2	1.34%	
2000	249	5 / 324	▲3	1.89%	
Feb 2005	238	2 / 243	▼3	4.41%	
Oct 2005	212	4 / 243	▲2	4.17%	
2010	243	0 / 243	▼4	3.21%	
2015	228	0 / 243	Steady	2.1%	
2020	80	1 / 243	▲1	1.5%	
2025	130	1 / 243	Steady	1.62%	
Chhattisgarh Legislative Assembly
2003	54	2 / 90	▲2	4.45%	
2008	90	2 / 90	Steady	6.11%	
2013	90	1 / 90	▼1	4.27%	
2018	33	2 / 90	▲1	3.9%	
2023	58	0 / 90	▼2	2.05%	
Delhi Legislative Assembly
1993	55	1 / 70	▲1	3.90%	
1998	58	0 / 70	▼1	3.15%	
2003	40	0 / 70	Steady	5.76%	
2008	70	2 / 70	▲2	14.05%	
2013	69	0 / 70	▼2	5.33%	
2015	70	0 / 70	Steady	1.31%	
2020	68	0 / 70	Steady	0.71%	
2025	70	0 / 70	Steady	0.58%	
Haryana Legislative Assembly
2000	83	1 / 90	▲1	5.74%	
2005	84	1 / 90	Steady	3.22%	
2009	86	1 / 90	Steady	6.73%	
2014	87	1 / 90	Steady	4.4%	
2019	87	0 / 90	▼1	4.21%	
2024	35	0 / 90	Steady	1.81%	
Himachal Pradesh Legislative Assembly
1990	35	0 / 68	Steady	0.94%	
1993	49	0 / 68	Steady	2.25%	
1998	28	0 / 68	Steady	1.41%	
2003	23	0 / 68	Steady	0.7%	
2007	67	1 / 68	▲1	7.40%	
2012	67	0 / 68	▼1	1.7%	
2017	42	0 / 68	Steady	0.49%	
2022	53	0 / 68	Steady	0.35%	
Jammu and Kashmir Legislative Assembly
1996	29	4 / 87	▲4	6.43%	
2002	33	1 / 87	▼3	4.50%	
2008	83	0 / 87	▼1	3.73%	
2014	50	0 / 87	Steady	1.41%	
2024	27	0 / 87	Steady	0.96%	
Jharkhand Legislative Assembly
2009	78	0 / 81	Steady	2.44%	
2014	61	1 / 81	Steady	1.8%	
2019	67	0 / 81	▼1	2.5%	
2024	55	0 / 81	Steady	0.78%	
Karnataka Legislative Assembly
2018	18	1 / 234	▲1	0.30%	
2023	133	0 / 234	▼1	0.31%	
Kerala Legislative Assembly
2011	122	0 / 140	Steady	0.60%	
2016	74	0 / 140	Steady	0.24%	
2021	72	0 / 140	Steady	0.23%	
Madhya Pradesh Legislative Assembly
1990	183	2 / 320	▲2	3.54%	-
1993	286	11 / 320	▲9	7.05%	▲3.51%
1998	170	11 / 320	Steady	6.15%	▼0.9%
2003	157	2 / 230	▼9	7.26%	▼1.11%
2008	228	7 / 230	▲5	8.97%	▲1.71%
2013	227	4 / 230	▼3	6.29%	▼2.68%
2018	227	2 / 230	▼2	5.01%	▼1.28%
2023	181	0 / 230	▼2	3.40%	▼1.61%
Maharashtra Legislative Assembly
1990	122	0	Steady	0.42%	
1995	145	0	Steady	1.49%	
1999	83	0	Steady	0.39%	
2004	272	0	Steady	4.0%	
2009	287	0	Steady	2.35%	
2014	280	0	Steady	2.33%	
2019	262	0	Steady	0.92%	
2024	262	0	Steady	0.48%	
Punjab Legislative Assembly
1992	105	9 / 117	▲9	16.32%	
1997	67	1 / 117	▼8	7.48%	
2002	100	0 / 117	▼1	5.69%	
2007	115	0 / 117	Steady	4.13%	
2012	117	0 / 117	Steady	4.29%	
2017	111	0 / 117	Steady	1.52%	
2022	20	1 / 117	▲1	1.77%	
Rajasthan Legislative Assembly
1990	57	0 / 200	Steady	0.79%	
1993	50	0 / 200	Steady	0.56%	
1998	108	2 / 200	▲2	2.17%	
2003	124	2 / 200	Steady	3.97%	
2008	199	6 / 200	▲4	7.60%	
2013	199	3 / 200	▼3	3.37%	
2018	199	6 / 200	▲3	4.03%	
2023	199	2 / 200	▼4	1.82%	
Telangana Legislative Assembly
2018	106	0 / 117	▼2	2.10%	
2023	106	0 / 117	Steady	1.37%	
Uttarakhand Legislative Assembly
2002	68	7 / 70	▲7	10.93%	-
2007	70	8 / 70	▲1	11.76%	▲0.83%
2012	70	3 / 70	▼5	12.19%	▲0.43%
2017	69	0 / 70	▼3	6.98%	▼5.21%
2022	54	2 / 70	▲2	4.82%	▼1.16%
Uttar Pradesh Legislative Assembly
1989	372	13 / 425	▲13	9.41%	-
1991	386	12 / 425	▼1	9.44%	▲0.03%
1993	164	67 / 425	▲55	11.12%	▲1.68%
1996	299	67 / 425	Steady	19.64%	▲8.52%
2002	401	98 / 403	▲31	23.06%	▲3.42%
2007	403	206 / 403	▲108	30.43%	▲7.37%
2012	403	80 / 403	▼126	25.91%	▼4.48%
2017	403	19 / 403	▼61	22.23%	▼3.71%
2022	403	1 / 403	▼18	12.88%	▼9.43%

== Gallery ==
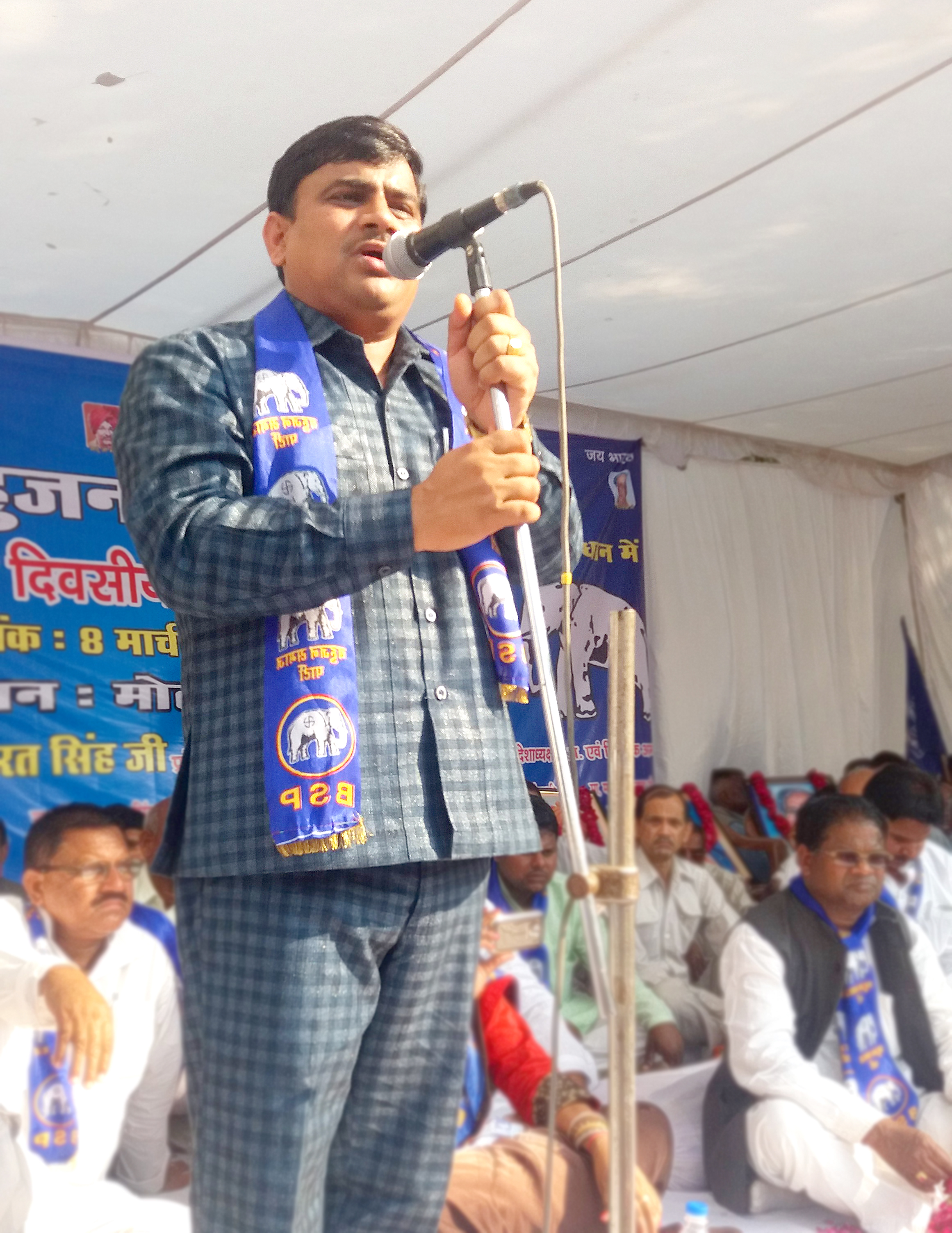
Bsp cadre Madhya pradesh

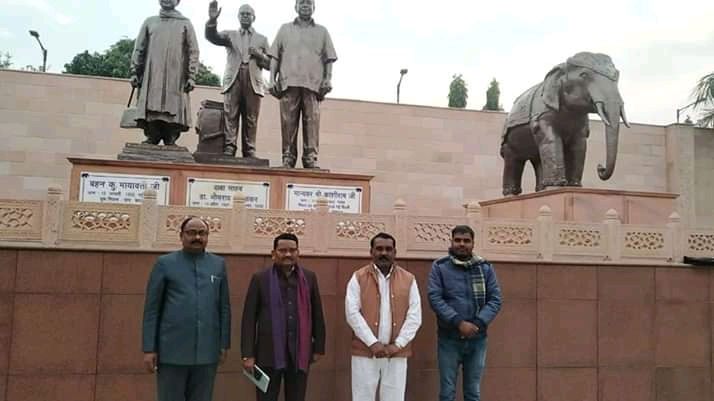
BSP Leaders at Bahujan Samaj Prerna Kendra

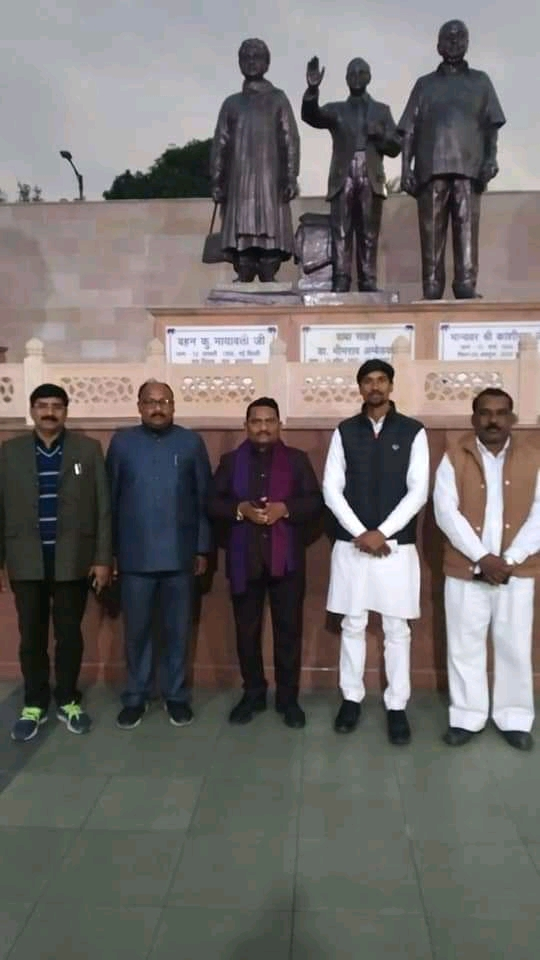
BSP Leaders at Bahujan Samaj Prerna Kendra

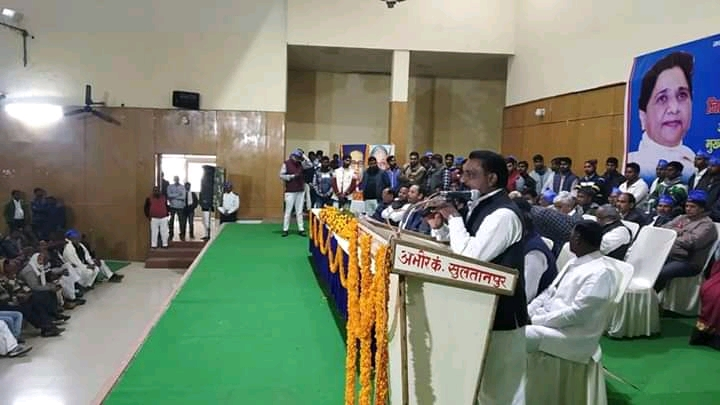
BSP cadre camp

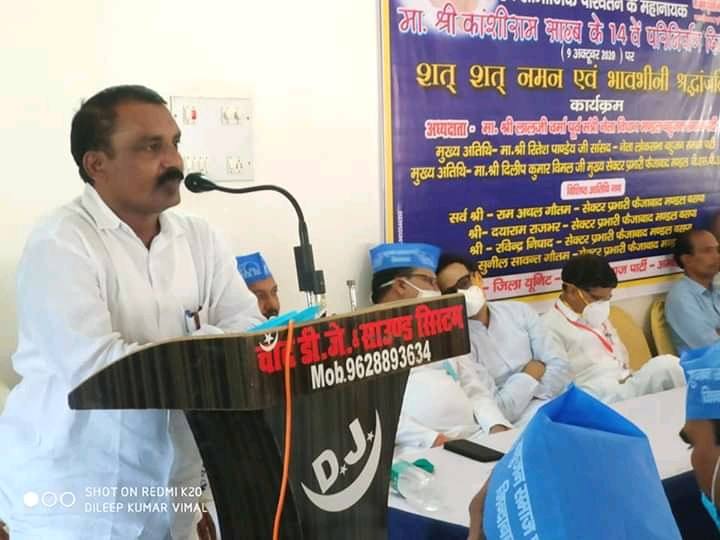
BSP cadre camp

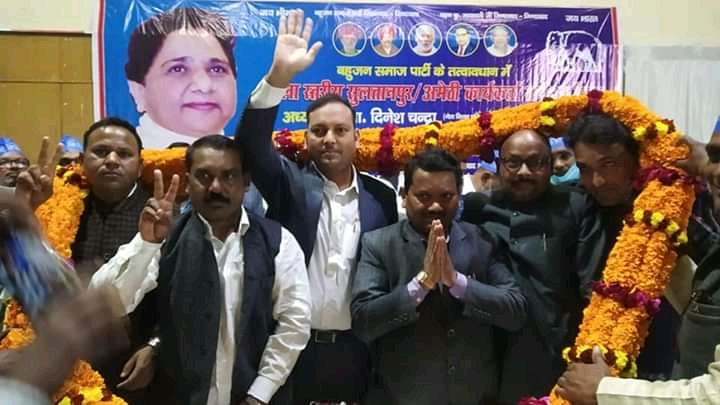
BSP cadre camp

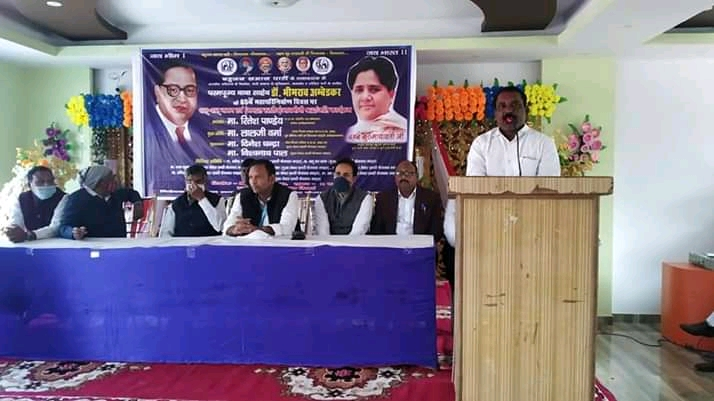
BSP cadre camp

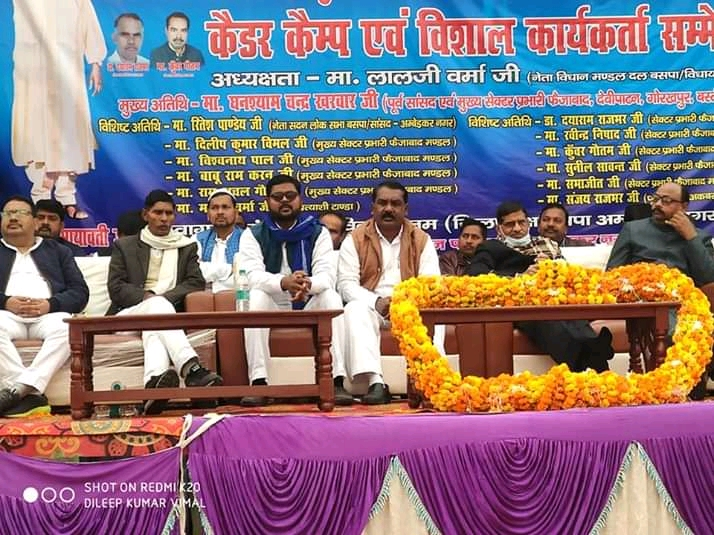
BSP cadre camp

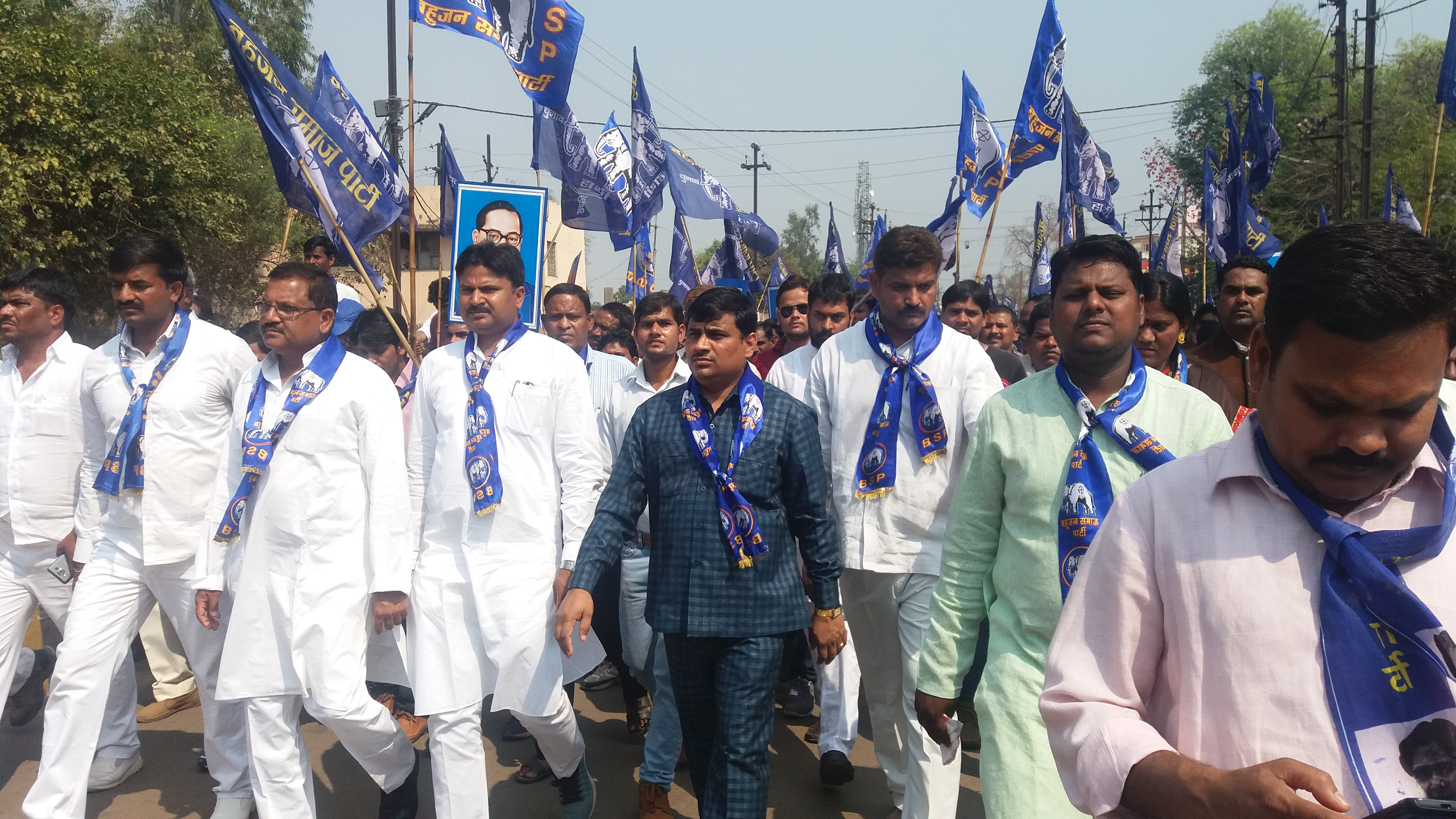
BSP Cadre Madhya Pradesh

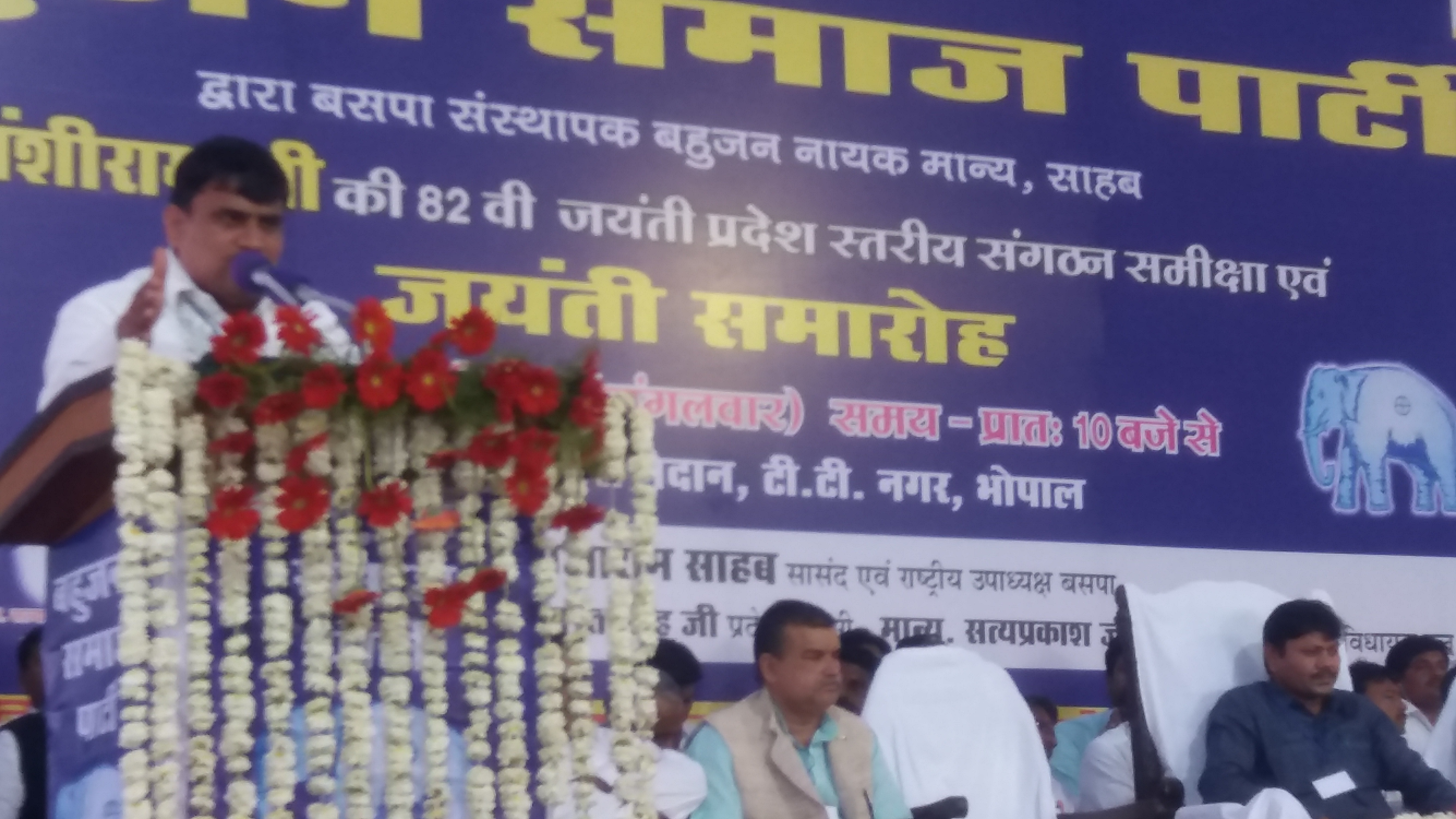
BSP Cadre

== See also ==
- BAMCEF
- Dalit Shoshit Samaj Sangharsh Samiti
- Republican Party of India
- Kanshi Ram
- Mayawati
- Jai Bhim
- Bahujan Volunteer Force
- List of political parties in India
