= Bahujan =

Buddhist term related to Indian politics

Bahujan is a Pali term frequently found in Buddhist texts, with a literal meaning of "the many", or "the majority". In a modern context, it refers to the combined population of the Scheduled Castes and Scheduled Tribes, Other Backward Classes, Muslims, Sikhs and other religious minorities, who together constitute the demographic majority of India. The word bahujan appears in the dictum "Bahujana sukhaya bahujana hitaya cha" ("for the happiness of the many, for the welfare of the many"), articulated by Gautama Buddha.

In the post-independence era, the term bahujan was introduced into Indian political discourse and given its modern definition by anti-caste social movements inspired by the work of B. R. Ambedkar and Jyotirao Phule, and often associated with Dalit Buddhism. The outlook of these movements is sometimes referred to in English as Bahujanism, and is positioned by its proponents as a majoritarian philosophy demanding social equality for backward castes, religious minorities, and other disadvantaged communities, in opposition to the dominance of the Forward Castes. Similarly, the term bahujanisation has been used to refer to the coalescence of various movements advancing the interests of particular backward castes and communities into a broad united front seeking comprehensive social change.

The word bahujan features prominently in the names of political parties basing their political programme on this philosophy and campaigning as advocates for groups included under the bahujan umbrella, such as the Bahujan Samaj Party, Vanchit Bahujan Aaghadi, Bahujan Mukti Party, and the Bharipa Bahujan Mahasangh of India, as well as the Bahujan Shakti Party of Nepal.

== See also ==
- Caste politics
- Ahinda
- Bahujan Samaj Party (disambiguation)
