= Bahujana sukhaya bahujana hitaya cha =

Sanskrit aphorism

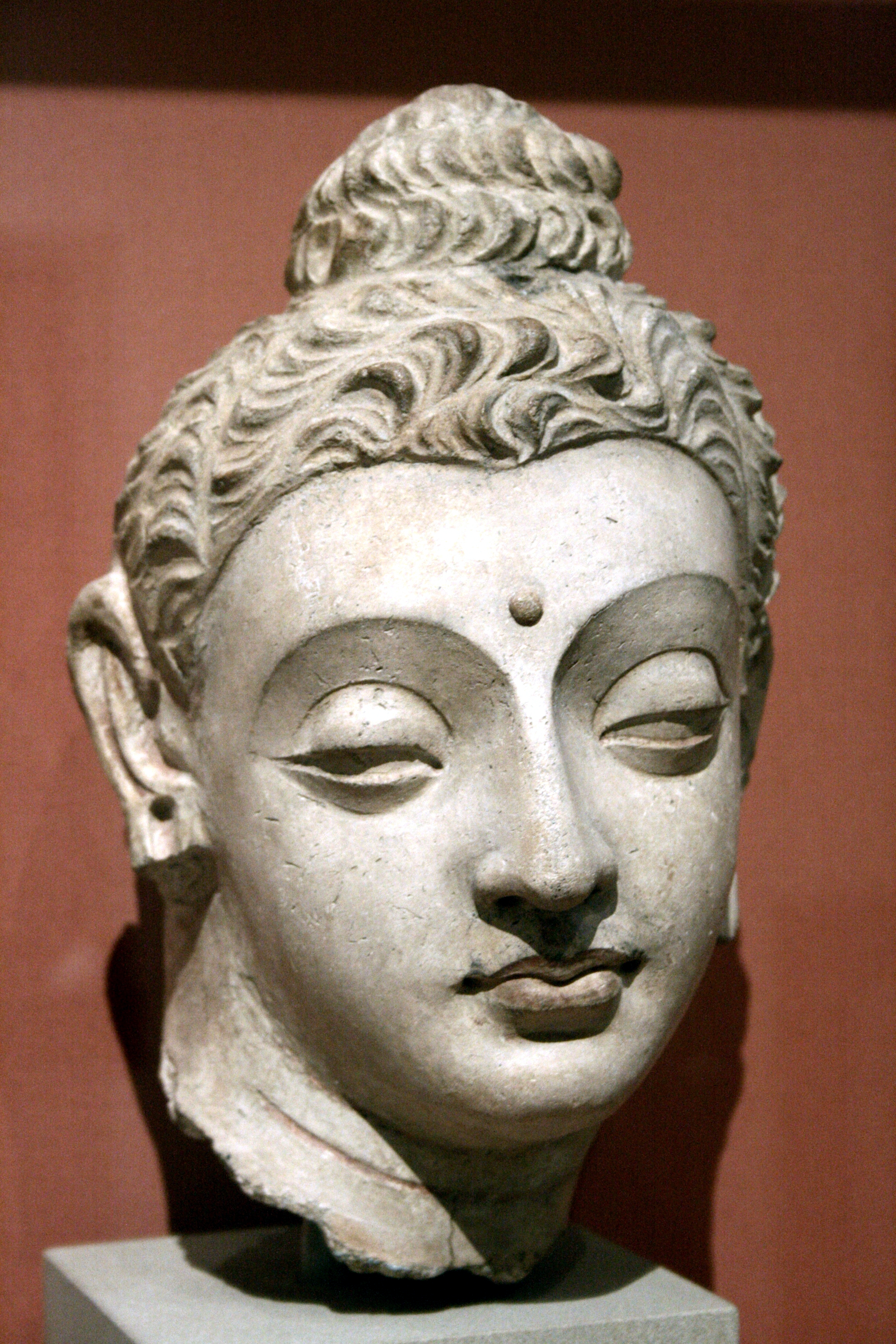
Gautama Buddha in the fifth century BCE suggested his disciples to work for the welfare and happiness of the masses under the dictum Bahujana sukhaya bahujana hitaya cha.

Bahujana sukhaya bahujana hitaya cha (lit. For the happiness of the many, for the welfare of the many) is a dictum or aphorism enunciated in the Rigveda in Sanskrit.

Hinduism defines five basic traditional philosophical concepts and the fifth concept enjoined to be followed is the concept of "welfare of the many, the happiness of the many".

Gautama Buddha in the fifth century BCE suggested his disciples to work for the welfare and happiness of the masses under the same dictum. Numerous others such as the nineteenth-century Hindu monk Swami Vivekananda and Indian nationalist, freedom fighter, philosopher Sri Aurobindo also spoke on this aphorism.

This aphorism is the motto of the All India Radio (AIR) a National Public Service Broadcaster and its emblem depicts the motto.

== Explanation ==
=== Chanakya's Arthshastra ===
Vishnugupta, popularly known as Chanakya or Kautilya, the architect of the Mauryan Empire in the fourth century BCE, theorized further, working on this basic dictum, and brought out a treatise called "Kautilya’s Arthashastra" meaning a treatise on Public Administration the first such document in India. Kautilya's approach enshrined the "State as an institutional necessity for human advancement” and then prescribed in details all the actions to be taken by the ruler of the state. His elaboration of the main dictum of the Hindu philosophy "bahujan sukhaya bahujan hitaya", that is, "public welfare lies in the happiness of the masses" was interpreted with the following theory.

Sanskrit sloka: Praja sukhe sukham rajyaha prajanamcha hitehitam,
Natma priyyam hitam rajanaha prajanam cha hitam priyam.

English translation: “In the happiness of his public rests the king’s happiness, in their welfare his welfare
He shall not consider as good only that which pleases him but treat as beneficial to him whatever pleases his public.

=== In Hinduism ===
Hinduism defines five basic traditional philosophical concepts and the fifth concept enjoined to be followed is the concept of "welfare of the many, the happiness of the many." This concept does not allow Hindus to have conflicts among its various classes. The tenet's basic approach is for the good of the entire human race, and in particular of the down trodden people. Vivekananda also stressed this aspect as a message for mankind.

=== In Buddhism ===
Gautama Buddha after he attained self-realization gave sermons to his disciples. The first sermon that he delivered to his five disciples was Dhamma Chakka Pavattana Sutta meaning "the turning of the wheel of Dharma" which was further interpreted as bahujana hitAya-bahujana sukhaya. For Buddha, according to this dictum, excessive luxury and excessive work were both to be shunned in order to achieve welfare and prosperity among human beings. As these two approaches cannot be put to practice, it was essential to adopt mujjhima patipada meaning a middle course to usher welfare and progress in life. This sermon formed the core of the seed of the tree which emerged as "Buddhism with its several branches containing flowers and fruits full of enlightenment."

=== Vivekananda's view ===
Vivekananda for the purpose of providing an aesthetic vision to this aphorism said that the Brahman, the enlightened, never seeks fruits or happiness for his action but works for the welfare of others. He also observed that a "socio-aesthetic worker" aims to usher a distinctive change in the society to derive the benefit of a life of beauty and order. He emphasized that a realization of "valiant aesthetic force in the society" was essential through Mahashakti (divine force).

=== All India Radio's motto ===
Akashavani, meaning "celestial voice", is the All India Radio (AIR), a National Public Service Broadcaster which was established in 1930 with the motto 'Bahujan Hitaya : Bahujan Sukhaya'. Living up to this motto, AIR has been serving the nation's masses in the fields of education, information and entertainment; it is one of the largest institutions in the world. The emblem of AIR is inscribed with the word Akashvani at its base and with its motto on its flanks.
