= Jangid =

Caste in Hinduism known for producing furniture and arts

Jangid (Sanskrit: जऻगिड, romanized: Jāngid) or Jaangid is a caste or community in India, specializing in architectural work, woodwork like idol making, temple making, shipbuilding, wooden furniture making, representing working class people in ancient India. They belong to the Vishwakarma sect. The terms Jangid and Vishwakarma have been used interchangeably in India for centuries. They have a notable presence in the states of Haryana, Rajasthan and Punjab.
