= Sarsai (disambiguation) =

Sarsai is a village in Junagadh district, Gujarat, India

Sarsai can also refer to:

- Sarsai Nawar, a village in Etawah district, Uttar Pradesh, India
- Sarsai Nawar Wetland, a bird sanctuary
- Sarsaina, a village in Rajasthan
