= Takha =

Village in India

- Village
- Location in Uttar Pradesh, India
- Coordinates: 26.82°N 79.30°E
- Country: India
- State: Uttar Pradesh
- District: Etawah

Government
  - Type: Panchayat raj
  - Body: Gram Panchayat
- Elevation: 153 m (502 ft)

Population (2011)
  - Total: 10,969

Languages
  - Official: Hindi
- Time zone: UTC+5:30 (IST)
- Vehicle registration: UP-75
- Literacy: 75.74%
- Lok Sabha Constituency: Mainpuri
- Vidhan Sabha Constituency: Jaswantnagar
- Highways: Agra-Lucknow Expressway
- Airport: Saifai airstrip

Takha is a village in the Etawah district Uttar Pradesh. It is also a Sub-Division (Tehsil) and Block (Kshetra Panchayat) of the Etawah district.

== Geography ==
Takha is a block and a tehsil. It is located 23 km (14 mi) north of the district headquarters and nearest city Etawah. It is about 140 km (87 mi) away from the historic city of the Taj Mahal, Agra and 190 km (120 mi) from the state capital Lucknow.

== Takha Tehsil Etawah ==
- Takha is a subdistrict

== Transport ==
Roads

Takha has a good road connection to the Agra Lucknow Expressway. Takha UPSRTC Services serve Takha Tehsil Bus Stand

Railway

Takha has no railway station. Nearby stations are Etawah Junction railway station & Ekdil

Airport

Saifai airstrip is only 8 km (5.0 mi) from the village and provides connectivity to Delhi, Nearby International Airport is Taj International Airport Jewar Uttar Pradesh

== Education ==
Schools & Colleges in Takha are either government run schools or private schools . The schools are affiliated to the All-India Indian Certificate of Secondary Education (ICSE) or the Central Board of Secondary Education (CBSE) boards.

- Jila Panchayat School Usrahar
- Usrahar Public School

== Demographic ==
As of the 2011 census the population was 10,969 of which 5,942 were male and 5,027 female. The population of children between age 0-6 was 1674 which was 15.26% of the total population.
