= Divrasai =

Village in India

- Village
- Location in Uttar Pradesh Divrasai (India)
- Coordinates: 26.819°N 79.149°E
- Country: India
- State: Uttar Pradesh
- District: Etawah
- Elevation: 100 m (330 ft)

Population (2001)
  - Total: 4,000

Languages
  - Official: Hindi
- Time zone: UTC+5:30 (IST)
- PIN: 206242
- Telephone code: 05680
- Vehicle registration: UP75

Divrasai is a village in the Bharthana mandal of Etawah district in the state of Uttar Pradesh.

== Language ==
The official language of Divrasai is Hindi. The majority of the people are Kachhi followed by Shakya.

== Religious demography ==
The Divrasai population believe in Buddhism and Hinduism. Its population as of 2011 was 1,022.

== Description ==
Divrasai is located 21 km distance from the district's main city, Etawah. It is 171 km from its state's main city of Lucknow. The village is 127 km from Gwalior Airport. Two government schools are present. The first school is 5th standard and second is 8th class.

The village's railway station was built 100 years ago and connects it to Etawah and Bharthana. In (1920–1990) the village head (mukhiya) was Khusali Shakya.

Nagla Dhara	Rasulabad	Nagla Ramphal	Nagla Ghasi	Nagla Laik	Nagla Sikariya	Birsinghpura	Ratauli	Apurpur	Lakhanpura	Kusna	Khanpur
0.3 km	1.5 km	1.8 km	1.1 km	1.1 km	0.7 km	2.1 km	1.6 km	1.2 km	1.4 km	0.9 km	1.3 km
