= Mahewa =

Town in India

- Village
- Location within Uttar Pradesh Location within India
- Coordinates: 26.621373°N 79.2301369°E
- Country: India
- State: Uttar Pradesh
- District: Etawah
- Block: Mahewa

Area
  - Total: 3.570 km^{2} (1.378 sq mi)

Population (2011)
  - Total: 4,897

Languages
  - Official: Hindi
- Time zone: UTC+5:30 (IST)
- PIN: 206128
- Telephone code: 05680

Mahewa is a village in Etawah district, in the Uttar Pradesh State, this was the first block of Independent India in 1950 with the name of Agrami Vikas Yojana by General lord Mayor, and a pea processing plant was established here with the help of the USA government. This village also played a significant role in the time of the freedom struggle, when Mahewa came to the Lakhana Estate. After the Independence the Pilot workshop manufactured or supplied agricultural equipment in all over India and SAARC Nations.

There is a big pond of lotus in the middle of the village called mahapatra of British time is in front of a mango garden. Due to that pond and the beauty of lotus, the district collector of Etawah came to this village during British time and there was a very famous cave (GUFA) in village Bhawanipur in ancient time.

There is very old temple of Ram Janki, that was made by the landlord of Mahewa, Pt Guru Narayan Chaube in 1912 before the independence of India.

== Demographics ==
As of 2011, Asai had a population of 4,897, in 855 households. This population was 52.5% male (2,573) and 47.5% female (2,324). The 0–6 age group numbered 644 (319 male and 325 female), making up 13.2% of the total population. 1,879 residents were members of Scheduled Castes, or 38.4% of the total.

== Infrastructure ==
As of 2011, Mahewa had 4 primary schools; it did not have any healthcare facilities. Drinking water was provided by tap, hand pump, and tube well/bore well; there were no public toilets. The village had a sub post office but no public library; there was at least some access to electricity for all purposes. Streets were made of both kachcha and pakka materials.

== Government Services ==
There is only one National Bank i.e. State Bank of India and the IFSC Code: SBIN0002572 and Contact number is this 05680-20018 and two State level Bank one "Gramin Bank, Mahewa" other-one "co-operative bank, Mahewa", Post Office of Mahewa Provide the postal service and banking service to increase the savings of families, One Samudayik swasthya kendra ( Government Hospital ) [To many prathmik swasthya kendra (primary hospital) attached form Mahewa samudayik swasthya kendra such as Lakhna, Aheripur, Bakewar, chakarnagar, Hanumantpur, etc.], Animal Hospital Elablished in 1978 for the care of animal in this region. Rashtriya Gramodyog to improving the participation of women in the cotton industry mainly work on the pattern of khadi gram udyog scheme started by Mahatma Gandhi.

== Education ==
Government aided Lokmanya Rural Inter College offering education from 6th class to 12th Class and for girls education mahadevi kanya pathshala inter college and Sanskrit mahavidyalaya offer traditional education.

== Sansad Adarsh Gram Yojana ==
Former Member of parliament Ashok Kumar Doharey choose Mahewa for the programme Sansad Adarsh Gram Yojana (Hindi: सांसद आदर्श ग्राम योजना). The programme was launched by the Prime Minister of India, Narendra Modi on the birth anniversary of Jayaprakash Narayan, on 11 October 2014.

== Mahewa Panchayat ==
There are various other villages comes under Mahewa Panchayat

- Mahewa
- Aanepur
- Mukutpur
- Bahera
- Ujhiyani
- Bhawanipur
- Gulzar nagar Etc.

Great Hindi poet Gopaldas Saxena 'Neeraj', (popularly known as Gopaldas Neeraj or Niraj or Neeraj) was born in Puravali near Mahewa town on 4 January 1924, and he died on July 19, 2018, at the age of 93 due to lung infection in AIIMS Delhi.

== Mahewa Block ==
Mahewa Block ( Kshetra Panchayat ) is one of the largest block in India with 92 Gram Panchayat and 106 members of Block called Block Dovelopement candidate, Mahewa is largerst block in all Etawah district's block.

=== List of villages ===
The following 118 villages are counted as part of Mahewa CD block:

1. Ababakarpur
2. Aheripur
3. Ahmadpur
4. Andawa
5. Aneypur
6. Asadpur
7. Asai
8. Bahadurpur Dhar
9. Bahera
10. Bakewar (rural)
11. Ballampur
12. Bamhora Humayunpur
13. Baraukh
14. Barauli
15. Basaiya Har
16. Beerpur Salempur
17. Beri Khera
18. Bhareipur
19. Bhulpur
20. Bidhipur
21. Bijauli
22. Bilahati
23. Binayakpur
24. Birahipur
25. Bishuna Mai
26. Chandpura
27. Chindoli
28. Daderpur
29. Dadora
30. Daipur
31. Dalip Nagar
32. Dharampur
33. Dhaurkha
34. Ekari
35. Eknor
36. Fatehpura
37. Gautampur
38. Ghughseena
39. Haluhrjipur
40. Ikaghara
41. Indraokhi
42. Indrapur
43. Indrosi
44. Ingurri
45. Ishwaripur
46. Jagmohanpur
47. Jaimalpur
48. Jaitpur
49. Kachhpura
50. Karondhi
51. Karwa Bujurg
52. Khargpur
53. Khitora
54. Kiratpur
55. Kudariya
56. Kunetha
57. Kushgawan Ahiran
58. Labedi
59. Lakhana
60. Lakhanpur Ghar
61. Lalpur
62. Ludhiyana
63. Maha Singh Pur
64. Mahewa (block headquarters)
65. Mahipalpur
66. Mahnepur
67. Malupur
68. Maniya Mau
69. Manpura
70. Marauli
71. Megoopur
72. Mehdipur
73. Mubarakpur
74. Mukatpur
75. Muraina Kalan Khurd
76. Nagari Lolupur
77. Nagaria Bujurg
78. Nagla Hari
79. Nagla Jek
80. Nagla Kale
81. Nagla Maha Singh Pur
82. Nagla Matrampur
83. Nagla Sarangpur
84. Nagla Shukul
85. Nandgawan
86. Naserpur Bojha
87. Naudhna
88. Naugawan
89. Nawada Khurd Kalan
90. Niwari Kalan
91. Niwari Khurd
92. Paoli
93. Parsoli Orampur
94. Patiya Chatorpur
95. Pilkhana
96. Piparipur Dhar
97. Pirthverampur
98. Purawali
99. Rahatpur
100. Ramaupur
101. Ratanpur
102. Sabdalpur Daudpur
103. Saidpur
104. Sarai Ilahi
105. Sarai Jalal
106. Sarai Mithey
107. Sarai Narotam
108. Sarai Nodhana
109. Sherpur Rasoolpur
110. Singoli
111. Sunbarsa Bhatpur
112. Tadwa Ismailpur
113. Takrupur
114. Turukpur Paharpur
115. Udhannpura
116. Ujhiyani
117. Ureng
118. Vyaspur
