= Sarsai Nawar =

Village in India

- Village
- Location of Sarsai Nawar in Uttar Pradesh Sarsai Nawar (India) Sarsai Nawar (Asia)
- Coordinates: 26.96°N 79.23°E
- Country: India
- State: Uttar Pradesh
- District: Etawah

Government
  - Type: Panchayat Raj
  - Body: Gram Panchayat
- Elevation: 150 m (490 ft)

Population (2011)
  - Total: 10,762

Languages
  - Official: Hindi & English
- Time zone: UTC+05:30 (IST)
- Pincode: 206123
- Telephone code: 05680
- Vehicle registration: UP-75
- Literacy: 82.44%
- Highways: National Highway 234 (India)
- Airport: Saifai airstrip

Sarsai Nawar is a large village in the Etawah district of Uttar Pradesh, India. It is 329 kilometres (204 mi) south of the national capital New Delhi.

== Geography ==
Sarsai Nawar is located at 26.96°N 79.23°E. It has an average elevation of 153 metres (501 feet). It is about 140 km away from historic city of Taj Mahal, Agra and 190 km from State capital Lucknow.

== Demographics ==
According to the 2011 census the population was 10,762, comprising 5,751 males and 5,011 females giving a sex ratio of 871. There were 1,641 children aged 0–6 and 2,541 members of scheduled castes. Literacy was 75.13% with male literacy at 84.33% and female 64.51%.

== Culture ==
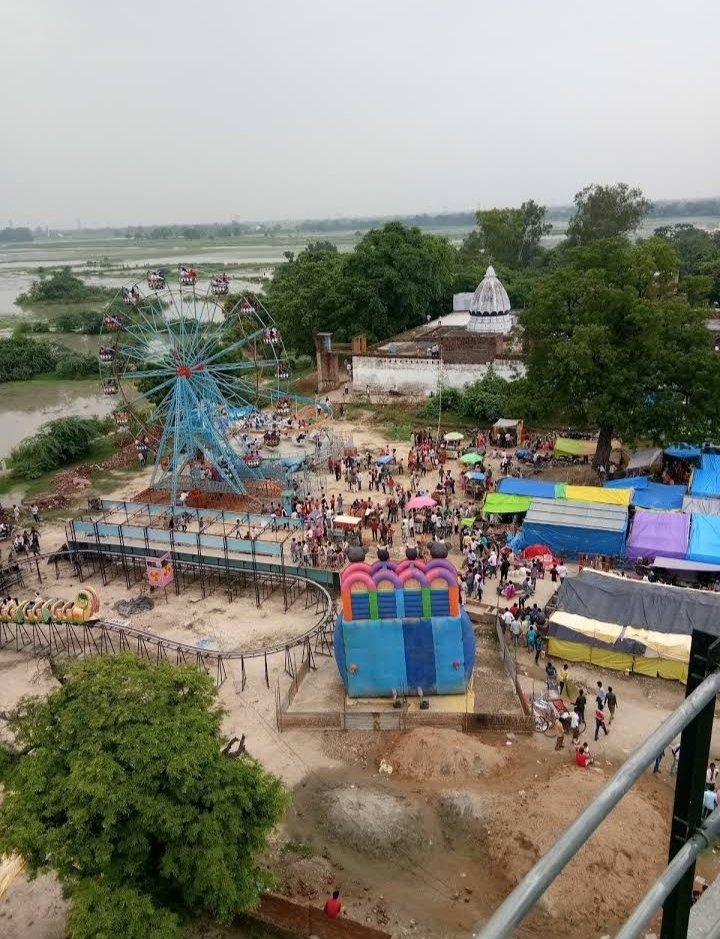
A Shivratri Festival at Hajari Mahadev

Hajari Mahadev Temple is a Hindu temple located here.

== Transport ==
=== Road ===
Sarsai Nawar is well connected to the Sarsai Road. network. It is 300 km from New Delhi the Agra Lucknow Expressway. goes to Takha Tehsil bus stand in Sarsai Nawar UPSRTC Services.

=== Railway ===
Sarsai Nawar has no railway station. The nearest are at Etawah Junction railway station & Ekdil

=== Airport ===
Saifai Airstrip is 20 km from the village, but has no scheduled flights. International airport at Lucknow and domestic airport at Agra are nearest operational airports.

== Education ==
Schools & Colleges in Sarsai Nawar are either government run schools or private schools. The schools are affiliated to the All-India Indian Certificate of Secondary Education (ICSE) or the Central Board of Secondary Education (CBSE) boards.

== Tourism ==
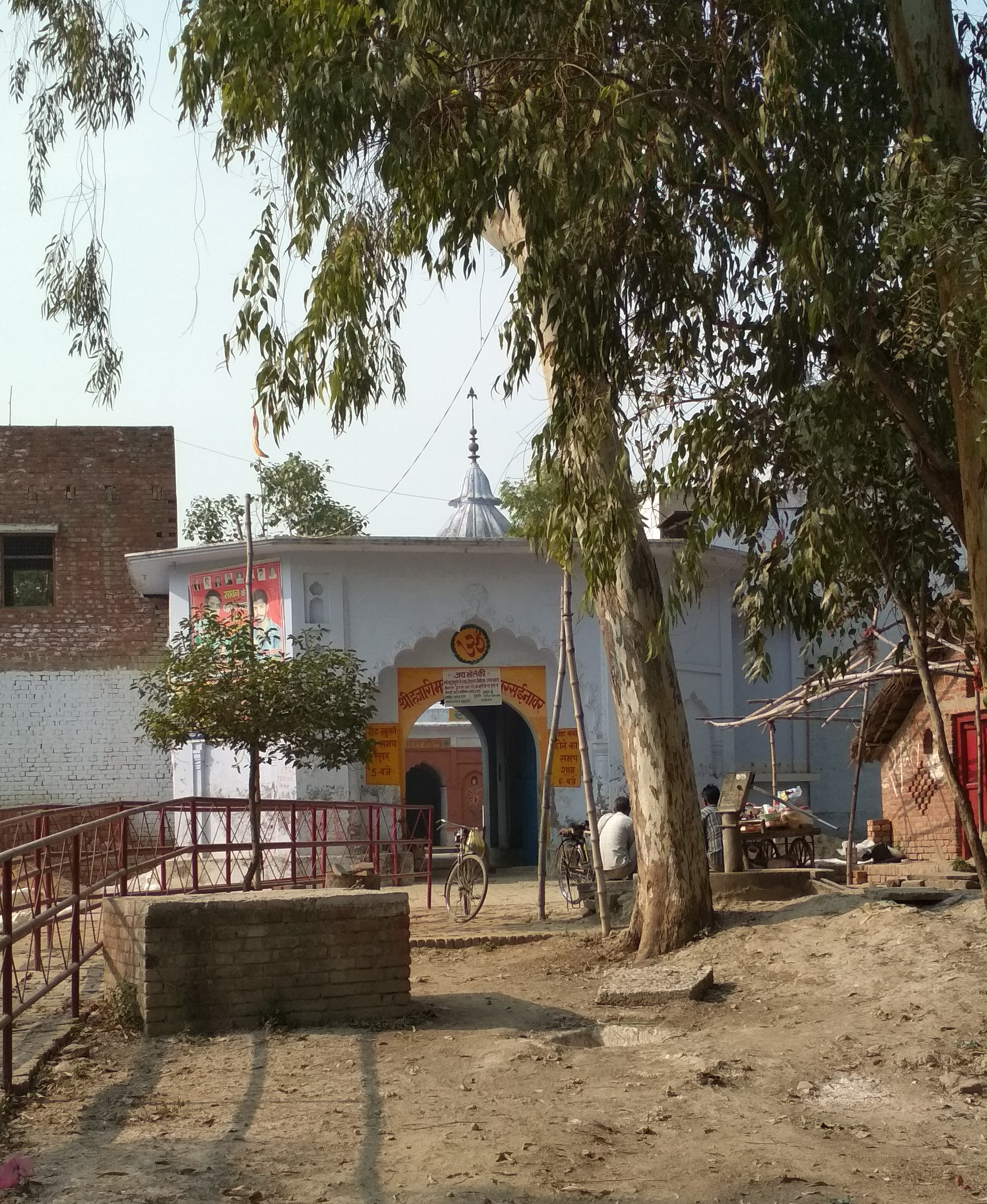
Rathore Park

Sarsai Nawar Wetland is a bird sanctuary and a protected area.
