= Asai, Etawah =

Village in Uttar Pradesh, India

Asai
- Village
- Location in Uttar Pradesh, India
- Coordinates: 26.68825°N 79.0567°E
- Country: India
- State: Uttar Pradesh
- District: Etawah
- Tehsil: Chakarnagar

Area
  - Total: 2.207 km^{2} (0.852 sq mi)

Population (2011)
  - Total: 942
  - Density: 427/km^{2} (1,110/sq mi)
- Time zone: UTC+5:30 (IST)

Asai (Āsaī) is a village in Mahewa block of Etawah district, Uttar Pradesh. As of 2011, it had a population of 942, in 143 households. Its existence is documented since at least the late 1100s, when there was a Pashupata Shaiva matha here on the banks of the Yamuna, as well as a temple of Someshvara.

== History ==
S. Subramonia Iyer identified Asai with the place called Āsatikā or Āsatī in two copper plate grants (Note: Both grants were found locally at Asai, at apparently the same time, when a farmer happened to dig them up while ploughing a field.) dating from the reign of the Gāhaḍavāla dynasty king Jayachandra. The first grant, dated to 2 November 1172, records a land grant (Note: The 1172 grant consisted of a field called Lahaḍa-kṣetra, to the south of the agrahāra settlement of Vakradevapura, in Siddhachauṭa-pattala. The field's boundaries with four villages are described in the grant, but other than the village of Gautamapurī, which Subramonia Iyer identified with present-day Gautampur, none of them can be identified.) by a rāṇaka named Abhayapāla to a paṇḍita named Kedārarāśi, with Jayachandra's explicit approval (Jayachandra, as king, would normally be expected to give his assent to any such grants). The grant seems to have been intended for the temple of Someśvaradeva in Āsatī, with Kedārarāśi (whose exact role at the temple is unclear) supposed to be receiving the gift on behalf of the god Someśvaradeva. The inscription states that Abhayapāla bathed in the Yamunā at Āsatikā before making the grant. The second grant, dated to 10 January 1183, was made by a rāṇaka named Amṛtapāla (again, after bathing in the Yamunā at Āsatikā) to Nīlakaṇṭha, who was Kedārarāśi's son and was a resident at a Pāśupata maṭha at Āsatī. This inscription never specifies what exactly is being granted, but it implies that the grant consists of the village of Vahaḍhovi-grāma in Payidhuka-pattalā. Subramonia Iyer considered these inscriptions significant for indicating that Asai had a Pāśupata maṭha on the banks of the Yamunā at this period, as well as recording what appears to have been a related dynasty of feudatories under the Gāhaḍavālas in the Etawah region.

== Demographics ==
As of 2011, Asai had a population of 942, in 143 households. This population was 55.4% male (522) and 44.6% female (420). The 0–6 age group numbered 155 (88 male and 67 female), making up 16.5% of the total population. 181 residents were members of Scheduled Castes, or 19.2% of the total.

The 1981 census recorded Asai as having a population of 636 people, in 119 households.

The 1961 census recorded Asai as comprising 6 hamlets, with a total population of 464 people (253 male and 211 female), in 84 households and 82 physical houses. The area of the village was given as 1,225 acres.

== Infrastructure ==
As of 2011, Asai had 1 primary school; it did not have any healthcare facilities. Drinking water was provided by tap, well, hand pump, and tube well/bore well; there were no public toilets. The village did not have a post office or public library; there was at least some access to electricity for all purposes. Streets were made of both kachcha and pakka materials.
