= Revolutionary Front =

Revolutionary Front may refer to:

- Cuban Democratic Revolutionary Front
- Democratic Revolutionary Front for the Liberation of Arabistan
- Democratic Revolutionary Front-New Alternative
- Islamic Revolutionary Front or Islamic Inquilab Mahaz, an alias of the militant group Lashkar-e-Taiba
- Karnataka Revolutionary Front or Karnataka Kranti Ranga (Karnataka, India)
- Krantikari Morcha or Revolutionary Front (Uttar Pradesh, India)
- Left Revolutionary Front (Portugal)
- National Revolutionary Front or Barisan Revolusi Nasional
- National Revolutionary Front for the Liberation of Haiti
- People's Revolutionary Front (Marxist−Leninist−Maoist)
- Popular Revolutionary Front for the Liberation of Palestine
- Revolutionary Front for an Independent East Timor (Fretilin)
- Sikkim Krantikari Morcha or Sikkim Revolutionary Front (Sikkim, India)
- Sudan Revolutionary Front
- Syria Revolutionaries Front
- United Revolutionary Front of Bhutan
- University Students' African Revolutionary Front
- Revolutionary Front (Sweden)

== See also ==
- Afar Revolutionary Democratic Unity Front
- Eelam People's Revolutionary Liberation Front
- Krantikari Mukti Morcha or Revolutionary Liberation Front (defunct; Bihar, India)
- Krantikari Manuwadi Morcha or Revolutionary Manuvadi Front (India)
- Revolution
- Revolutionary and Popular Indoamericano Front
- Revolutionary Antifascist Patriotic Front
- Revolutionary Democratic Front
- Revolutionary Democratic Front (2006)
- Revolutionary Left Front (Bolivia)
- Revolutionary United Front
- Revolutionary Youth Front
