= Jaswantnagar railway station =

Railway station in India

General information
- Location: National Highway 19, Jaswantnagar, Uttar Pradesh; India
- Coordinates: 26.8734°N 78.8936°E
- Elevation: 155 metres (509 ft)
- System: Indian Railways station
- Owner: Indian Railways
- Operator: North Central Railway
- Line: Agra–Bhopal section
- Platforms: 4
- Tracks: 6
- Connections: Auto stand

Construction
- Structure type: Standard (on ground station)
- Parking: No
- Cycle facilities: No

Other information
- Status: Active
- Station code: JGR
- Zone(s): North Central Railway
- Division(s): Allahabad railway division

Services
Preceding station	Indian Railways	Following station
Balrai towards ?	North Central Railway zone Agra–Bhopal section	Sarai Bhopat towards ?
Location
- Location within India Location within Uttar Pradesh

Jaswantnagar railway station is a small railway station in Etawah district, Uttar Pradesh. Its code is JGR. It serves Jaswantnagar city. The station consists of four platforms. The platforms are well sheltered. The station lacks many facilities, including water and sanitation.
