= Mulayam Singh Yadav =

Indian politician (1939–2022)

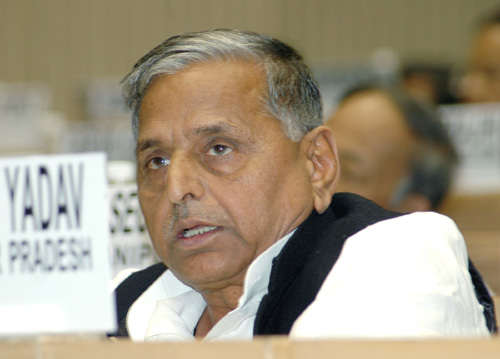
- Mulayam Singh in 2006

21st Minister of Defence
- In office 1 June 1996 – 19 March 1998
- President: K. R. Narayanan; Shankar Dayal Sharma
- Prime Minister: H. D. Deve Gowda; I. K. Gujral
- Preceded by: Pramod Mahajan
- Succeeded by: George Fernandes

15th Chief Minister of Uttar Pradesh
- In office 29 August 2003 – 13 May 2007
- Preceded by: Mayawati
- Succeeded by: Mayawati
- In office 5 December 1993 – 3 June 1995
- Preceded by: President's rule
- Succeeded by: Mayawati
- In office 5 December 1989 – 24 June 1991
- Preceded by: N. D. Tiwari
- Succeeded by: Kalyan Singh

Member of Parliament, Lok Sabha
- In office 23 May 2019 – 10 October 2022
- Preceded by: Tej Pratap Singh Yadav
- Succeeded by: Dimple Yadav
- Constituency: Mainpuri, Uttar Pradesh
- In office 16 May 2014 – 23 May 2019
- Preceded by: Ramakant Yadav
- Succeeded by: Akhilesh Yadav
- Constituency: Azamgarh, Uttar Pradesh
- In office 16 May 2009 – 16 May 2014
- Preceded by: Dharmendra Yadav
- Succeeded by: Tej Pratap Singh Yadav
- Constituency: Mainpuri, Uttar Pradesh
- In office 10 March 1998 – 29 August 2003
- Preceded by: D. P. Yadav
- Succeeded by: Ram Gopal Yadav
- Constituency: Sambhal, Uttar Pradesh
- In office 15 May 1996 – 4 December 1998
- Preceded by: Uday Pratap Singh
- Succeeded by: Balram Singh Yadav
- Constituency: Mainpuri, Uttar Pradesh

Cabinet Minister Government of Uttar Pradesh
- In office 23 June 1977 – 17 February 1980
- Chief Minister: Banarasi Das; Ram Naresh Yadav
- Ministry & Department's: Animal Husbandry; Co-Operative

20th Leader of the Opposition Uttar Pradesh Legislative Assembly
- In office 14 May 2007 – 26 May 2009
- Chief Minister: Mayawati
- Preceded by: Lalji Tandon
- Succeeded by: Shivpal Singh Yadav
- In office 4 July 1995 – 1 June 1996
- Chief Minister: Mayawati
- Preceded by: Kalyan Singh
- Succeeded by: Dhaniram Verma
- In office 17 March 1985 – 10 February 1987
- Chief Minister: N. D. Tiwari; Vir Bahadur Singh
- Preceded by: Rajendra Singh
- Succeeded by: Satyapal Singh Yadav

10th Leader of the Opposition Uttar Pradesh Legislative Council
- In office 26 June 1982 – 8 November 1984
- Chief Minister: Sripati Mishra; N. D. Tiwari
- Preceded by: Mahipal Shastri
- Succeeded by: Ammar Rizvi

Guidance Leader of the Samajwadi Party
- In office 1 January 2017 – 10 October 2022
- President: Akhilesh Yadav
- Preceded by: post established
- Succeeded by: post abolished

President of the Samajwadi Party
- In office 3 October 1992 – 1 January 2017
- Preceded by: post established
- Succeeded by: Akhilesh Yadav

Personal details
- Born: 22 November 1939 Saifai, United Provinces, British India (present-day Etawah, Uttar Pradesh, India)
- Died: 10 October 2022 (aged 82) Gurugram, Haryana, India
- Party: Samajwadi Party (1992–2022)
- Other political affiliations: Socialist Party; Bharatiya Lok Dal; Janata Party; Bharatiya Kranti Dal; Janata Dal; Krantikari Morcha; Samajwadi Janata Party
- Spouses: Malati Devi (m. 1957; died 2003); Sadhana Gupta (m. 2003; died 2022)
- Relations: The Yadav Family
- Children: Akhilesh Yadav
- Education: Karm Kshetra Post Graduate College, Etawah; B.R. College, Agra University
- Occupation: Agriculturist; Politician; Teacher
- Awards: Padma Vibhushan (2023) (posthumous) International Jurist Award (2012), London

Mulayam Singh Yadav (22 November 1939 – 10 October 2022) also known "Neta ji" was an Indian politician, schoolmaster, lecturer and a socialist figure and the founder of the Samajwadi Party. Over the course of a political career spanning more than six decades, he served three terms as the Chief Minister of Uttar Pradesh, and also as the Union Minister of Defence in the Government of India. A long-time parliamentarian, he was a seven-time Member of Parliament representing the Mainpuri, Azamgarh, Sambhal and Kannauj constituencies in the Lok Sabha, a ten-time member of the Legislative Assembly, member of the Legislative Council and the Leader of Opposition several times as well. Yadav was often referred to as Netaji by his party leaders and workers. In 2023, he was posthumously conferred with Padma Vibhushan, India’s second highest civilian award by the Government of India.

== Early life and career ==
Mulayam Singh Yadav was born to Murti Devi and Sughar Singh Yadav on 22 November 1939 in Saifai village, United Provinces, British India (present-day Etawah district, Uttar Pradesh, India). in the Kamariya gotra of Yadav family. Akhilesh Yadav is his only son from his first marriage to Malti Devi.

Yadav paternally belonged to Itoli village, Jasrana Block, Firozabad District, Uttar Pradesh, India.

Yadav earned three degrees in political science — a B.A. from Karm Kshetra Post Graduate College in Etawah, a B.T. from A. K. College in Shikohabad, and an M.A. from B. R. College, Agra University.

=== Teaching career ===
Before joining politics, Yadav had a career in teaching. In 1963, he was a schoolmaster at Jain Inter-College in Karhal, Mainpuri. In 1974, he was promoted to a lecturer after attaining his master's degree.

== Earlier political career ==
He started his political career in student politics at K.K. Degree College in Etawah, where he became the students’ union president. Groomed by leaders such as Ram Manohar Lohia, Raj Narain, Anantram Jaiswal and Chandra Shekhar, Yadav was first elected as a Member of the Legislative Assembly in the Legislative Assembly of Uttar Pradesh in 1967 from Jaswantnagar on a ticket of Samyukta Socialist Party (SSP), which was founded by Anantram Jaiswal and George Fernandes. In 1975, during Indira Gandhi's imposition of the Emergency, Yadav was arrested and detained for 19 months.

He first became a state minister in 1977. Later, in 1980, he became the president of the Lok Dal (People's Party) in Uttar Pradesh, which afterwards became a part of the Janata Dal (People's Party). In 1982, he was elected leader of the opposition in the Uttar Pradesh Legislative Council and held that post until 1985. When the Lok Dal split, Yadav launched the Krantikari Morcha party.

== Chief Minister ==
=== First term ===
Following the demolition of the Babri Masjid, Kanshi Ram and Mulayam Singh Yadav formed a coalition government in Uttar Pradesh in 1993. Yadav first became Chief Minister of Uttar Pradesh in 1989.

In 1990, a large body of Sangh Parivar and Vishwa Hindu Parishad supporters reached Ayodhya and attempted to attack the 16th-century Babri mosque built on occupied land. They organised a march towards the mosque in an attempt to reclaim the land for a grand temple for Hindu god Rama. This resulted in a pitched battle with the paramilitary forces. The state government's official records report that at least 17 marching religious volunteers, or kar sevaks were killed.

The BJP withdrew its support to the V. P. Singh ministry, necessitating fresh elections. The BJP substantially increased its tally in the union parliament, as well as winning a majority in the Uttar Pradesh assembly.

After the collapse of the Union government led by V. P. Singh in November 1990, Yadav joined Chandra Shekhar's Janata Dal (Socialist) and continued in office as chief minister with the support of the Indian National Congress (INC). His government fell when the INC withdrew its support in April 1991 in the aftermath of developments at the national level where it had earlier withdrawn its support for Chandra Shekhar's government. Mid-term elections to Uttar Pradesh assembly were held in mid-1991, in which Mulayam Singh's party lost power to the BJP.

=== Second term ===
In 1992, Yadav founded his own Samajwadi Party (Socialist Party). In 1992, Hindu right wing mob was involved in the demolition of the Babri Mosque, which caused violence across India. In 1993, he allied with the Bahujan Samaj Party for the elections to the Uttar Pradesh assembly due to be held in November 1993. The alliance between Samajwadi Party and Bahujan Samaj Party prevented the return of BJP to power in the state.

In 1993, Yadav became the Chief Minister of Uttar Pradesh for the second time. Yadav became chief minister with the support of Congress and Janata Dal. His stand on the movement for demanding separate statehood for Uttarakhand was as controversial as his stand on the Ayodhya movement in 1990 was. There was a firing on Uttarakhand activists at Muzaffarnagar on 2 October 1994, something for which Uttarakhand activists held him responsible. He continued holding that post until his ally opted into another alliance in June 1995.

=== Third term ===
In 2002, following a fluid post-election situation in Uttar Pradesh, the Bharatiya Janata Party and Bahujan Samaj Party joined to form a government under the Dalit leader Mayawati, who was considered to be Yadav's greatest political rival in the state. The BJP pulled out of the government on 25 August 2003, and enough rebel legislators of the Bahujan Samaj Party left to allow Yadav to become the Chief Minister, with the support of independents and small parties. He was sworn in as chief minister of Uttar Pradesh for the third time in September 2003.

Yadav was still a member of the Lok Sabha when he was sworn in as chief minister. In order to meet the constitutional requirement of becoming a member of state legislature within six months of being sworn in, he contested the assembly by-election from Gunnaur assembly seat in January 2004. Yadav won by a record margin of 1,83,899 votes, polling 90.45 per cent of the votes.

== Union Politics, Defence Minister and Member of Parliament ==
He was elected to the Uttar Pradesh Legislative Assembly ten times and to the Parliament of India, Lok Sabha seven times.

=== 1996 Lok Sabha election (Minister of Defence) ===
In 1996, Yadav was elected to the eleventh Lok Sabha from Mainpuri constituency. In the United Front coalition government formed that year, his party joined and he was named India's Defence Minister in the Deve Gowda ministry. That government fell in 1998 as India went in for fresh elections, but he returned to the Lok Sabha that year from Sambhal parliamentary constituency. After the fall of Atal Bihari Vajpayee union government in April 1999, he did not support the Congress party in the formation of the union government.

=== 1998, 1999 Lok Sabha election ===
He contested the Lok Sabha general elections of 1999 from two seats, Sambhal Lok Sabha constituency. Later following year 1999, he contested also in Kannauj Lok Sabha constituency, and won both seats. He resigned from the Kannauj seat for his son Akhilesh in the by-elections and retained Sambhal.

=== 2004 Lok Sabha election ===
With the hope of playing a major role at the centre, Yadav contested the 2004 Lok Sabha elections from Mainpuri while still Chief Minister of Uttar Pradesh. He won the seat and his Samajwadi Party won more seats in Uttar Pradesh than all other parties. However, the Congress party, which formed the coalition government at the centre after the elections, had the majority in the Lok Sabha with the support of the Communist parties. As a result, Yadav could not play any significant role at the centre. Yadav resigned from the Lok Sabha and chose to continue as chief minister of Uttar Pradesh until the 2007 elections, when he lost to the BSP.

=== 2014 Lok Sabha election ===
He was elected in the 2014 Indian general election. He became an MP in the 16th Lok Sabha from Azamgarh and Mainpuri. The competing party BJP did not field a strong candidate in the election from Mainpuri. In June 2014 he resigned from Mainpuri seat and continued to represent Azamgarh in Parliament.

In May 2017, two Indian soldiers were killed and their bodies were mutilated by Pakistan's Border Action Team. When Yadav, who had served as the Defence Minister in past, was asked by journalists to comment on the attacks, he responded by saying "Defence Minister (Arun Jaitley) is weak and coward can never take on enemies. I have one question for the union government and the minister concerned: why are you not able to muster courage to show the enemy their place." He also said that during his term as defence minister in the Deve Gowda ministry, he had ordered the Indian Army to cross into Pakistan in response to attacks.

=== 2019 Lok Sabha election ===
He was re-elected in the 2019 Indian general election from Mainpuri for a fifth time. This was his fourth consecutive victory from the same constituency. He died in 2022, two years before the end of his term.

== Samajwadi Party ==
In 1992, Yadav founded his own Samajwadi Party (Socialist Party). Muslims make a sizeable minority in Uttar Pradesh. Samajwadi Party and Yadav emerged as the advocates for Muslims.

Since Akhilesh Yadav became Chief Minister of Uttar Pradesh in 2012, surpassing Mulayam's brother Shivpal Singh Yadav, the Yadav family was divided into two feuding groups. One of the groups, led by Akhilesh, enjoyed the support of his father's cousin and National General Secretary Ram Gopal Yadav. The rival group was led by Mulayam Singh and supported by his brother and State Chief of Party, Shivpal Yadav, and a friend, former MP Amar Singh. Akhilesh had fired his uncle twice from his cabinet as it was seen by many as a direct challenge to his father, who has steadily supported Shivpal over Akhilesh. On 30 December 2016, Mulayam Yadav expelled his son Akhilesh and his cousin Ram Gopal from the party for six years on the grounds of indiscipline, only to revoke the decision 24 hours later. Akhilesh, in response, stripped his father of the party presidency and instead named him the chief patron of the party following the national convention of the party on 1 January 2017. Mulayam termed the national convention illegal and directly expelled his cousin, Ram Gopal Yadav, who had convened the national executive convention. But the Election commission of India ruled that Ram Gopal Yadav had the right to convene that executive convention, and reversed Mulayam's order. Hence Akhilesh Yadav officially became the new national leader of the party.

== Positions held ==
Mulayam Singh Yadav had been elected 10 times as MLA and 7 times as Lok Sabha MP.

#	From	To	Position	Party
1.	1967	1969	MLA (1st term) from Jaswantnagar in 4th Vidhan Sabha	Samyukta Socialist Party
2.	1974	1977	MLA (2nd term) from Jaswantnagar	Bharatiya Kranti Dal
3.	1977	1980	MLA (3rd term) from Jaswantnagar	Bharatiya Lok Dal
4.	1982	1985	MLC (1st term) in Uttar Pradesh Legislative Council	Lok Dal
5.	1985	1989	MLA (4th term) from Jaswantnagar	Lok Dal
6.	1989	1991	* MLA (5th term) from Jaswantnagar * Chief Minister (1st term) in Government of UP	Janata Dal
7.	1991	1993	MLA (6th term) from Jaswantnagar, Nidhauli Kalan Assembly constituency and Tilhar (by-poll)	Samajwadi Janata Party
8.	1993	1996	* MLA (7th term) from Jaswantnagar and Shikohabad * Chief Minister (2nd term) in Government of UP (1993–1995)	Samajwadi Party
9.	1996	1996	MLA (8th term) from Sahaswan (resigned in 1996)	Samajwadi Party
10.	1996	1998	* MP (1st term) in 11th Lok Sabha from Mainpuri * Minister of Defence in Government of India	Samajwadi Party
11.	1998	1999	MP (2nd term) in 12th Lok Sabha from Sambhal	Samajwadi Party
12.	1999	2004	MP (3rd term) in 13th Lok Sabha from Sambhal and Kannauj (resigned from Kannauj in 2000)	Samajwadi Party
13.	2003	2007	* Chief Minister (3rd term) in Government of UP * MLA (9th term) from Gunnaur by-poll (2004–2007)	Samajwadi Party
14.	2004	2004	MP (4th term) in 14th Lok Sabha from Mainpuri (resigned in 2004)	Samajwadi Party
15.	2007	2009	MLA (10th term) from Gunnaur and Bharthana (resigned in 2009)	Samajwadi Party
16.	2009	2014	MP (5th term) in 15th Lok Sabha from Mainpuri	Samajwadi Party
17.	2014	2019	MP (6th term) in 16th Lok Sabha from Azamgarh and Mainpuri (resigned from Mainpuri in 2014)	Samajwadi Party
18.	2019	2022	MP (7th term) in 17th Lok Sabha from Mainpuri (died in 2022)	Samajwadi Party

== Election Contested ==
=== Uttar Pradesh Legislative Assembly Elections ===
Year	Constituency	Party	Votes	%	Opponent	Opponent Party	Opponent Votes	%	Result	Margin	%
1967	Jaswantnagar	SSP	21,990	39.65	J.S. Lal	RPI	10,196	18.39	Won	11,794	21.26
1969	Jaswantnagar	SSP	19,282		Bishambhar Singh Yadav	INC	24,559		Lost	-5,277	
1974	Jaswantnagar	BKD	31,587	42.87	Vishambhar Singh Yadav	INC	17,329	23.52	Won	14,258	19.35
1977	Jaswantnagar	JP	41,985	64.26	Gorey Lal Shakya	IND	15,523	23.76	Won	26,462	40.50
1980	Jaswantnagar	JP(S)	36,695	42.29	Balram Singh Yadav	INC(I)	44,306	51.06	Lost	-7,611	-8.77
1985	Jaswantnagar	LKD	49,390	57.32	Shivraj Singh Yadav	INC	23,916	27.75	Won	25,474	29.57
1989	Jaswantnagar	JD	65,597	59.26	Darshan Singh	INC	39,160	35.38	Won	26,437	23.88
1991	Jaswantnagar	SJP	47,765	45.96	Darshan Singh	INC	30,601	29.44	Won	17,164	16.52
1993	Jaswantnagar	SP	60,242	46.88	Darshan Singh Yadav	INC	59,081	45.98	Won	1,161	0.90
1993	Shikohabad	SP	55,249	42.43	Ashok Yadav	INC	39,558	30.38	Won	15,691	12.05
1993	Nidhauli Kalan Assembly constituency	SP	41,683	38.77	Sudhakar Verma	BJP	34,620	32.20	Won	7,063	6.57
1996	Sahaswan	SP	81,370	61.92	Mahesh Chand	BJP	27,211	20.71	Won	54,159	41.21
2007	Gunnaur	SP	54,696	60.54	Arif Ali	BSP	23,049	25.52	Won	31,647	35.02
2007	Bharthana	SP	62,799	48.22	Shiv Prasad Yadav	BSP	53,328	40.94	Won	9,471	7.28

=== Lok Sabha ===
Year	Constituency	Party	Votes	%	Opponent	Opponent Party	Opponent Votes	%	Result	Margin	%
1996	Mainpuri	SP	273,303	42.77	Updesh Singh Chauhan	BJP	221,345	34.64	Won	51,958	8.13
1998	Sambhal	SP	376,828	50.04	Dharampal Yadav	BJP	210,146	27.90	Won	166,682	22.14
1999	Sambhal	SP	259.430	41.85	Ch. Bhupendra Singh	BJP	143,596	23.17	Won	115,834	18.68
1999	Kannauj	SP	291,617	42.63	Arvind Pratap Singh	ABLTC	212,478	31.06	Won	79,139	11.57
2004	Mainpuri	SP	460,470	63.44	Ashok Shakya	BSP	122,600	17.03	Won	337,870	46.93
2009	Mainpuri	SP	392,308	56.44	Vinay Shakya	BSP	219,239	31.54	Won	173,069	24.90
2014	Mainpuri	SP	595,918	59.63	Shatrughan Singh Chauhan	BJP	231,252	23.14	Won	364,666	36.49
2014	Azamgarh	SP	340,306	35.43	Ramakant Yadav	BJP	277,102	28.85	Won	63,204	6.58
2019	Mainpuri	SP	524,926	53.75	Prem Singh Shakya	BJP	430,537	44.09	Won	94,389	9.66

== Political positions ==
=== Socialism ===
He followed Socialism. In the 1980s the Union Government of India had appointed Mandal Commission, a federal commission to identify the "socially backward classes" in India. The appointment led to protests across the country. During these protests Yadav defended the demands of the backward castes and religious minorities. Through these protests Yadav emerged as a socialist leader.

=== Support for a sovereign independent Tibet ===
Yadav said it is necessary for India to support a sovereign and independent Tibet. He said that a past government had made a "big mistake" on the issue and noted that he had spoken against it at the time. He believed that Tibet was a traditional buffer between China and India and that India should support the Dalai Lama and Tibetan independence. Claiming that China had secreted nuclear weapons in Pakistan, he cautioned that "China is our enemy, not Pakistan. Pakistan can do us no damage".

== Controversies ==
=== Comment on rape ===
The crime of rape became a capital offence in India following the 2012 Delhi gang rape incident; Yadav had opposed changing this law. Following the trial in the Shakti Mills gang rape, on 10 April 2014, in an election rally, Yadav said, "When boys and girls have differences, the girl gives a statement that 'the boy raped me,' and that poor boy gets a death sentence." Referring to the Mumbai gang rape he stated, "... later they had differences, and the girl went and gave a statement that I have been raped. And then the poor fellows, three of them have been sentenced to death. Should rape cases lead to hanging? Boys are boys, they make mistakes. Two or three have been given the death sentence in Mumbai." His statements led to complaints being filed against Yadav with the Election Commission and the National Commission for Women (NCW). His comments were denounced by the Indian media, women's groups, women's rights activists, public prosecutor in the Shakti Mills gang rape case Ujjwal Nikam, Bollywood celebrities, and politicians like Narendra Modi and Raj Thackeray.

"Ladke, ladke hain. Galti ho jati hai" he said while campaigning in Moradabad during the 2014 general elections, Yadav opposed the death penalty for rape convicts, suggesting it was an "unfair" law that should be amended. "Handing death sentence for rape is not fair... boys make mistakes... there will be changes in the law if we come to power,'" he reportedly said, external at an election rally in Uttar Pradesh. Newspapers and websites are criticising Mr Yadav for his "insensitive and unfortunate" comment, which came on a day India was voting in the third phase of the general election. "Mulayam Singh Yadav sinks to a new low, defends rapists to woo voters," says The Times of India. "Even by his misogynistic standards, he seems to have sunk to a new low… The change in the laws was brought on after months of selfless demonstration by citizens striving to bring about a change in India's social outlook, by terming rape as 'just another mistake boys make, Mulayam has just rendered a slap in the face of their efforts" the website says.

While distributing free e-rickshaws at a government event in Lucknow, Yadav attempted to defend the law-and-order situation in Uttar Pradesh by disputing the reporting of gang rape cases. He says "It is practically impossible for four people to commit a rape." Yadav claimed that while a crime is committed by a single individual, the names of three or four others are falsely included in the complaint. He further alleged that incidents of rape were being utilized as part of a "smear campaign" aimed at tarnishing the image of the Uttar Pradesh administration. As a result of this statement—and following widespread outrage among activists and across the political spectrum— a Judicial Magistrate in Lucknow issued a summons against him in 2015.

In response to 2014 Badaun gang rape and Yadav's comments, UN Secretary-General Ban Ki-moon said "We say no to the dismissive, destructive attitude of, 'Boys will be boys'". On 19 August 2015, Yadav remarked that gang-rapes are impractical and rape-victims in those cases tend to lie. He was summoned by the Judicial Magistrate of Mahoba district court in Uttar Pradesh for that remark. As a result of these statements, several media outlets described Yadav and the Samajwadi Party as "Defenders of Rape."

=== Phone Threat case ===
On 10 July 2015, ex Indian Police Service officer and President Adhikar Sena, Amitabh Thakur allegedly got a phone call from Yadav. Thakur alleged that Yadav had threatened him over the phone call. He released the audio of the phone call, in which Yadav is allegedly heard saying certain sentences, which Thakur called as being threatening in nature. Thakur alleged that Mulayam Singh was unhappy about the complaint lodged by his wife activist and advocate Nutan Thakur against the then state mining minister Gayatri Prasad Prajapati.

On 11 July 2015, Thakur presented a complaint before Hazratganj police station for registration of FIR against Yadav as regards the alleged phone threat, which the Police refused to register. On the contrary, in the same night of 11 July, a rape case was registered against Thakur by the Lucknow police at Gomtinagar police station, which raised political storm. Later FIR was registered in this case on Court intervention, which the Police closed but Thakur went on pursuing it before Court. The matter remained inconclusive till the end.

During Thakur's tenure as the Superintendent of Police of Ferozabad in 2006, he refused to obey some of the wrongful dictates of then MLA Ramveer Singh Yadav, who was a close aid of Yadav. The refusal led to an incidence of alleged assault and manhandling with Thakur. Despite Mulayam's orders, Thakur got a First Information Report (FIR) registered in this matter at Eka police station. This led to Thakur extensively suffering at the hands of Mulayam Singh Government.

=== Support for Criminals ===
In 2004, Deputy Superintendent of Police Shailendra Singh arrested Samajwadi Party leader and alleged gangster Mukhtar Ansari and booked him under the Prevention of Terrorism Act, 2002 in connection with an alleged attempt to procure a light machine gun. According to Singh, after the arrest, he and his senior officers came under pressure from the state government, then headed by Yadav as the Chief Minister of Uttar Pradesh. Singh later resigned from service, alleging political pressure.

=== Assets investigation ===
In 2005, advocate Vishwanath Chaturvedi filed a PIL alleging that Yadav and members of his family had assets disproportionate to their sources of income. In March 2007, the Supreme Court directed the CBI to conduct an inquiry into the allegations. The Yadav family was criticized by general public and media houses for disproportionate assets.

The CBI's initial findings reported prima facie evidence of disproportionate assets and estimated the unexplained assets to value around ₹2.63 crore. The Supreme Court then allowed the investigation against Mulayam Singh and his sons Akhilesh Yadav and Prateek Yadav to continue. The case was closed in 2019 by CBI informing the Supreme Court the lack of evidence.

=== Remarks on the Women’s Reservation Bill ===
In March 2010, during a debate on the Women’s Reservation Bill, which proposed 33% reservation for women in legislative bodies, Yadav opposed the measure and stated that “if the bill is passed it will fill Parliament with the kind of women who invite catcalls and whistles”. The remarks were criticised by leaders across several parties and described as sexist in media reports and by some of his own party colleagues. Following the comments, Samajwadi Party leaders Amar Singh and Jaya Prada urged the National Commission for Women to take action.

== Personal life and death ==
Yadav was married twice. His first wife, Malti Devi, was in a vegetative state from 1974 until her death in May 2003 following complications while giving birth to their only child, Akhilesh Yadav. Akhilesh was Chief Minister of Uttar Pradesh from 2012 to 2017.

Mulayam had a relationship with Sadhana Gupta while still married to Malti Devi in the 1990s. Gupta was not well known until February 2007, when the relationship was admitted in India's Supreme Court. Sadhana Gupta had a son named Prateek Yadav who died on 13 May 2026 due to lung disease. Sadhana Gupta died in July 2022 after a brief illness.

=== Family tree ===
Mulayam Singh Yadav had four brothers and a sister, Kamla Devi. Ram Gopal Yadav and his sister Geeta Devi are his cousins. The family tree of Yadav family is as follows:

Family tree of Mulayam Singh Yadav

Mewa Ram Yadav (grand father)
Murti Devi (Mother)	Sughar Singh Yadav (Father)	Bachchi Lal Yadav (uncle)
Ratan Singh Yadav (elder brother)	Mulayam Singh Yadav	Abhay Ram Yadav (younger brother)	Rajpal Singh Yadav (younger brother)	Shivpal Singh Yadav (youngest brother)	Kamla Devi (sister)	Ram Gopal Yadav (cousin)	Geeta Devi (cousin)
Ranvir Singh Yadav (nephew)	Akhilesh Yadav (son)	Dharmendra Yadav (nephew)	Aditya Yadav	Akshay Yadav	Arvind Pratap
Tej Pratap Singh Yadav (grand nephew)

=== Death ===
In September 2022, Yadav was admitted to hospital and put on a ventilator after his condition deteriorated. He had been hospitalised for a month. Yadav died on 10 October 2022 at age 82 in a Medanta hospital in Gurgaon. His last rites were performed with full state honours at his hometown Saifai.

== In popular culture ==
Main Mulayam Singh Yadav, an Indian Hindi-language biographical film by Suvendu Raj Ghosh based on his life, was released in 2021; with Amyth Sethi playing the title role.

== Electoral performance ==
1996 Indian general election: Mainpuri
Party	Candidate	Votes	%	±%
SP	Mulayam Singh Yadav	273,303	42.77	
BJP	Updesh Singh Chauhan	2,21,345	34.64	
BSP	Bhagwat Das Shakya	1,02,785	16.08	
INC	Kishan Chand	14,993	2.35	
Independent	Shiv Raj	4,509	0.71	
Majority		51,958	8.13	
Turnout		6,39,072	58.33	
SP gain from JP		Swing		

2004 Indian general elections: Mainpuri
Party	Candidate	Votes	%	±%
SP	Mulayam Singh Yadav	460,470	63.96	
BSP	Ashok Shakya	1,22,600	17.03	
BJP	Balram Singh Yadav	1,11,153	15.44	
INC	Thakur Rajendra Singh Jadon	9,896	1.37	−7.86
Majority		3,37,870	46.93	
Turnout		7,19,918	59.45	
SP hold		Swing		

Uttar Pradesh Assembly by election, 2004:Gunnaur
Party	Candidate	Votes	%	±%
SP	Mulayam Singh Yadav	195,213	91.45	
BSP	Arif Ali	11,314		
BJP	Gulfam Singh Yadav	6,941		
Majority		1,83,899		
SP gain from JD(U)		Swing		

2007 Bye Elections: Gunnaur
Party	Candidate	Votes	%	±%
SP	Pradeep Kumar Yadav	65,232	46.27	−
BSP	Deepak Kumar Yadav	51,569	36.58	−
RPD	Dharamveer Yadav	11,398	18.45	−
Bharatiya Janata party	Gulfam Singh Yadav	3,220	2.28	−
	Remainder 7 candidates	9,576	6.82	−
Majority		13,663	9.69	−
Turnout		14,0995		−
SP hold		Swing		

2009 Indian general elections: Mainpuri
Party	Candidate	Votes	%	±%
SP	Mulayam Singh Yadav	392,308	56.44	−7.00
BSP	Vinay Shakya	2,19,239	31.54	+14.51
BJP	Tripti Shakya	56,265	8.10	–7.34
Independent	Sachchida Nand	7,756	1.12	
CPI	Hakim Singh Yadav	4,168	0.60	
Majority		1,73,069	24.90	
Turnout		6,95,032	49.67	
SP hold		Swing		

2014 Indian general elections: Azamgarh
Party	Candidate	Votes	%	±%
SP	Mulayam Singh Yadav	340,306	35.43	▲17.86
BJP	Ramakant Yadav	2,77,102	28.85	▼6.28
BSP	Shah Alam Urf Guddu Jamali	2,66,528	27.75	▼0.43
INC	Arvind Kumar Jaiswal	17,950	1.87	▼2.55
RUC	Aamir Rashadi Madni	13,271	1.38	▼7.03
NOTA	None of the Above	5,660	0.59	N/A
Margin of victory		63,204	6.58	▼0.37
Turnout		9,60,600	56.40	▲11.76
SP gain from BJP		Swing		

2014 Indian general elections: Mainpuri
Party	Candidate	Votes	%	±%
SP	Mulayam Singh Yadav	595,918	59.63	
BJP	Shatrughan Singh Chauhan	2,31,252	23.14	
BSP	Dr. Sanghmitra Maurya	1,42,833	14.29	
Independent	Alok Nandan	5,645	0.56	
AAP	Baba Hardev Singh	5,323	0.55	
NOTA	None of the above	6,323	0.63	
Majority		3,64,666	36.49	
Turnout		9,99,427	60.46	
SP hold		Swing		

2019 Indian general elections: Mainpuri
Party	Candidate	Votes	%	±%
SP	Mulayam Singh Yadav	524,926	53.75	−10.71
BJP	Prem Singh Shakya	4,30,537	44.09	+11.30
IND.	Savendra Singh	2,631	0.27	N/A
NOTA	None of the Above	6,711	0.69	+0.03
Majority		94,389	9.66	−22.01
Turnout		9,78,261	56.77	−4.55
SP hold		Swing	-10.71	

== Notable works ==
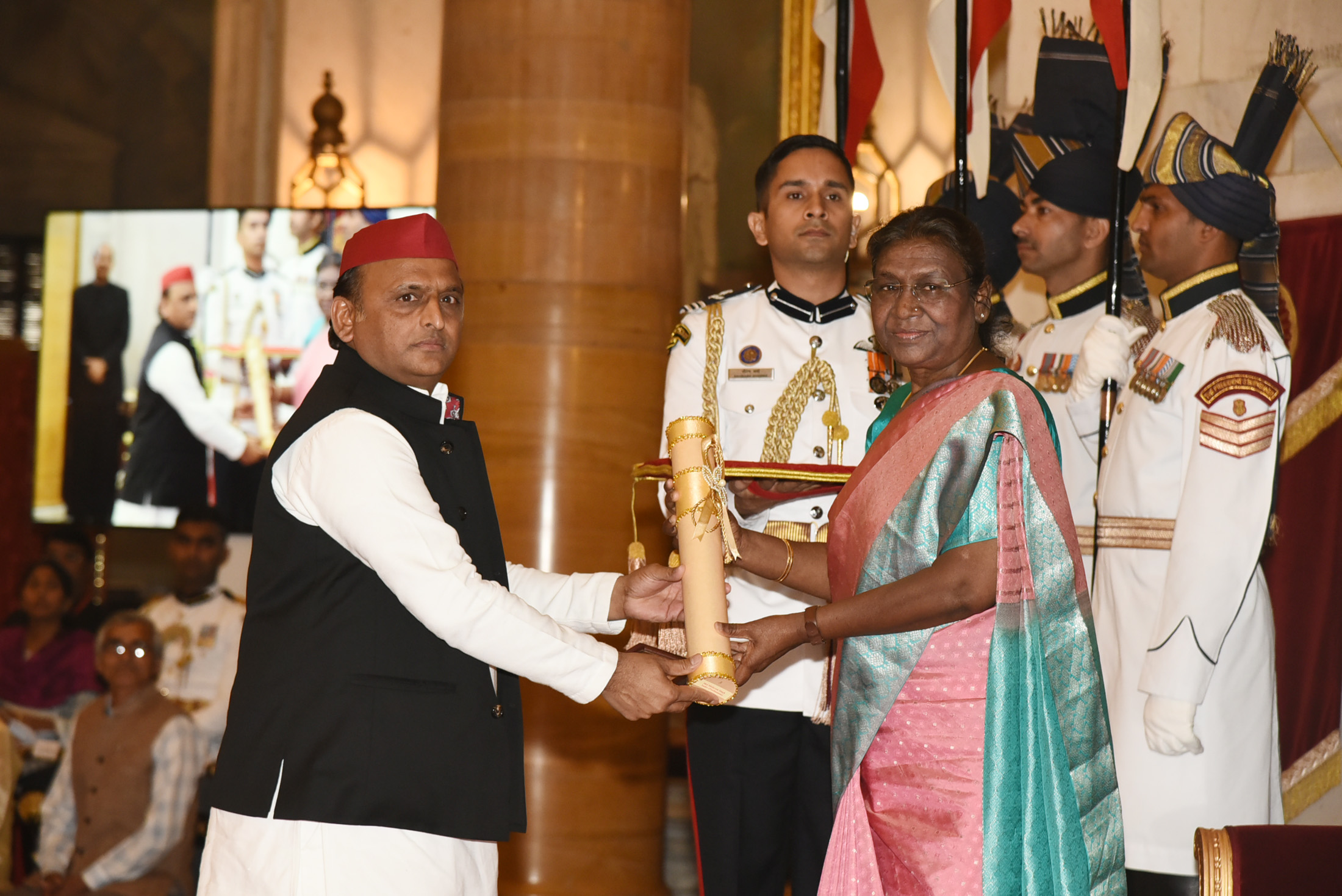
Akhilesh Yadav receiving Padma Vibhushan on the behalf of his late father in 2023

As Uttar Pradesh's Chief Minister, Mulayam Singh Yadav is credited with the establishment of legal and medical educational institutions like the Dr. Ram Manohar Lohiya National Law University, Dr. Ram Manohar Lohia Institute of Medical Sciences, U.P. Rural Institute of Medical Sciences and Research (now known as Uttar Pradesh University of Medical Sciences), Government Medical College, Azamgarh, Government Medical College, Kannauj etc.

One of his celebrated and notable decisions during his tenure as the Cabinet Minister in the Union Government was the historic change in the armed forces law regarding disposition of bodies of fallen soldiers, ensuring that the mortal remains of martyrs reached home. Yadav as the Defence Minister introduced a landmark law for the bodies of the slain armed forces personnel to be brought back with full respects to the families at the home of the martyred and mandatory state honour funeral to be organised. Under his tenure, advanced inventory fighter jet of the Indian Air Force Sukhoi Su-30 MKI was finalised and acquired by the Indian Government.

Party political offices
Preceded by Mulayam Singh Yadav	Leader of the Samajwadi Party in the 16th Lok Sabha; 2014–2022	Incumbent
