= Parasani =

Village in India

- village
- Interactive map of Parasani
- Country: India
- State: Uttar Pradesh

Government
  - Body: Gram panchayat

Languages
  - Official: Hindi
- Time zone: UTC+5:30 (IST)
- Vehicle registration: UP

Parasani is a village in Etawah district of Uttar Pradesh. It is 7;km from [Etawah Railway Station] On Road No 62, And Nearest Tample Is Pilua Mahaveer (Hanuman Ji). Most of the people are dependent on agriculture for living. Education facilities are very limited .
