= Bhimrao Ambedkar (Uttar Pradesh politician) =

Indian politician

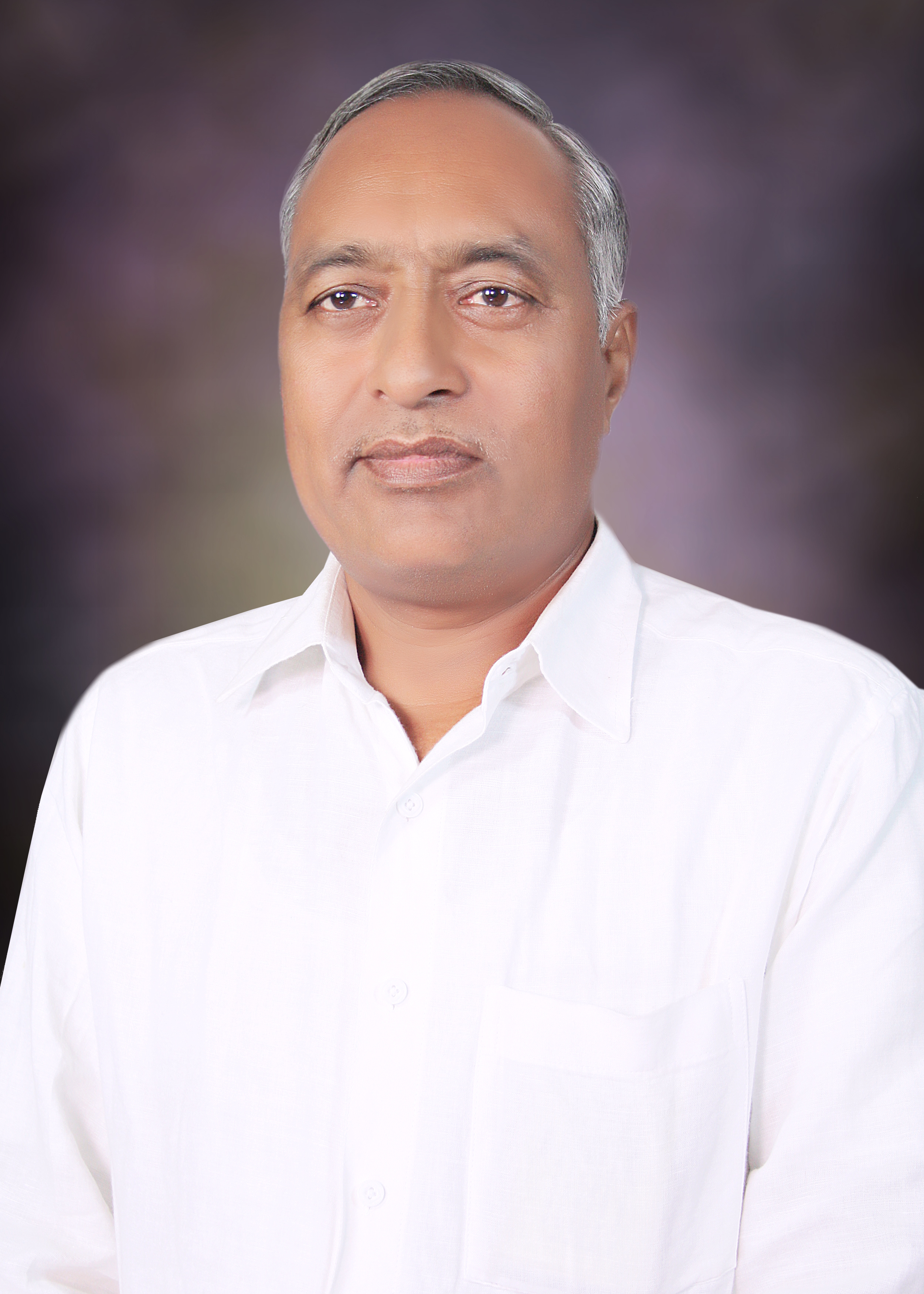
- Bhimrao Ambedkar (UP politician)

Member of the Indian Legislative Council
- In office 6 May 2018 – 5 May 2024
- Constituency: elected by Legislative Assembly members

Member of the Indian Legislative Assembly
- In office 2007–2012

Personal details
- Party: Bahujan Samaj Party
- Education: Kanpur University (MA), Allahabad University (LLB)

Bhimrao Ambedkar is an Indian politician from the Bahujan Samaj Party who is a former member of the Indian Legislative Council.

== Political career ==
=== MLC ===
In the elections on 23 March 2018, BJP won 11 out of 13 seats and the remaining two were won by Samajwadi Party and Bahujan Samaj Party each. Ambedkar became a member of the Uttar Pradesh Legislative Council.

He had earlier unsuccessfully contested the Rajya Sabha elections in 2018 where he was defeated by Anil Agrawal of the Bharatiya Janata Party.

=== MLA ===
He was elected from the Vidhan Sabha constituency Lakhna seat in the 2007 Uttar Pradesh state assembly elections and MLC U.P. in 2018. He was candidate of MP Rajya Sabha but due to some political situation he could not be elected.

He was named after the Indian leader B. R. Ambedkar.
