= Jaswantnagar Assembly constituency =

Constituency of the Uttar Pradesh legislative assembly in India

Coordinates: 26.88°N 78.90°E

Jaswantnagar
- Constituency No. 199 for the Uttar Pradesh Legislative Assembly

Constituency details
- Country: India
- Region: North India
- State: Uttar Pradesh
- District: Etawah
- Lok Sabha constituency: Manipuri
- Total electors: 3,92,072
- Reservation: None

Member of Legislative Assembly
- 18th Uttar Pradesh Legislative Assembly
- Incumbent Shivpal Singh Yadav
- Party: Samajwadi Party
- Elected year: 2022

Jaswantnagar Assembly constituency is a part of the Etawah district of Uttar Pradesh, India. It comes under Mainpuri Lok Sabha constituency.

== Members of Legislative Assembly ==
Year	Member	Party
1957	Chaudhary Abhay Ram Singh Yadav	Independent
1962	Chaudhary Natthu Singh Yadav	Praja Socialist Party
1967	Mulayam Singh Yadav	Samyukta Socialist Party
1969	Bishambhar Singh Yadav	Indian National Congress
1974	Mulayam Singh Yadav	Bharatiya Kranti Dal
1977	Mulayam Singh Yadav	Janata Party
1980	Balram Singh Yadav	Indian National Congress (I)
1985	Mulayam Singh Yadav	Lokdal
1989	Mulayam Singh Yadav	Janata Dal
1991	Mulayam Singh Yadav	Janata Party
1993	Mulayam Singh Yadav	Samajwadi Party
1996	Shivpal Singh Yadav	Samajwadi Party
2002	Shivpal Singh Yadav	Samajwadi Party
2007	Shivpal Singh Yadav	Samajwadi Party
2012	Shivpal Singh Yadav	Samajwadi Party
2017	Shivpal Singh Yadav	Samajwadi Party
2022	Shivpal Singh Yadav	Samajwadi Party

== Election results ==
=== 2027 ===
2027 Uttar Pradesh Legislative Assembly election: Jaswantnagar
Party	Candidate	Votes	%	±%
INDIA				
NDA				
BSP				
NOTA	None of the above			
Majority				
Turnout				
gain from		Swing		

=== 2022 ===
2022 Uttar Pradesh Legislative Assembly election: Jaswantnagar
Party	Candidate	Votes	%	±%
SP	Shivpal Singh Yadav	159,718	62.97	+8.55
BJP	Vivek Shakya	68,739	27.1	−4.75
BSP	Brajendra Pratap Singh	17,515	6.91	−3.61
Jan Adhikar Party	Madhu	4,560	1.8	
NOTA	None of the above	1,180	0.47	−0.1
Majority		90,979	35.87	+13.3
Turnout		253,630	64.69	+1.09
SP hold		Swing		

=== 2017 ===
U. P. Assembly Election, 2017: Jaswantnagar
Party	Candidate	Votes	%	±%
SP	Shivpal Singh Yadav	126,834	54.42	
BJP	Manish Yadav Patre	74,218	31.85	
BSP	Durvesh Kumar Shakya	24,509	10.52	
NOTA	None of the above	1,327	0.57	
Majority		52,616	22.57	
Turnout		233,057	63.6	
SP hold		Swing		

=== 2012 ===
U. P. Assembly Election, 2012: Jaswantnagar
Party	Candidate	Votes	%	±%
SP	Shivpal Singh Yadav	1,33,563	61.90	
BSP	Manish Yadav Pataray	52,479	24.32	
BJP	Rakesh Pal	12,708	5.89	
INC	Ajay Kumar Yadav (Guddu)	8,260	3.83	
MD	Sujit Kumar Shakya	4,125	1.91	
Majority		81,084	37.58	
Turnout		2,15,784	64.21	
SP hold		Swing		

=== 2007 ===
U. P. Assembly Election, 2007: Jaswantnagar
Party	Candidate	Votes	%	±%
SP	Shivpal Singh Yadav	73,211	57.8	
BSP	Baba Harnarayan Yadav	42,404 Votes	33.5	
BJP	Dr. Raj Bahadur Singh Yadav	4,687	3.7	
INC	Shishu Pal Singh Yadav	2,400	1.9	
Independent	Suraj Pal	1,872	1.5	
Majority		30,807	24.3	{{{change}}}
Turnout		1,26,671	53.3	{{{change}}}
SP hold		Swing		

2002

2002 Uttar Pradesh Legislative Assembly Election

● Shivpal Singh Yadav ( SP ) : 80,544 Votes : 61.41%

● Ramesh Chandra Shakya ( BSP ) : 27,555 Votes : 21.01%

● Shiv Prasad ( BJP ) : 14,146 Votes : 10.79%

● Rakesh Kumar ( RTKP ) : 4,155 Votes : 3.17%

Majority - 52,989 Votes : 40.40%

Turnout - 1,31,158 Votes : 60.28%

Registered Electors : 2,17,582 Voters

1996

1996 Uttar Pradesh Legislative Assembly Election

● Shivpal Singh Yadav ( SP ) : 68,377 Votes : 52.44%

● Darshan Singh Yadav ( INC ) : 57,438 Votes : 44.05%

● Gaya Prasad ( IND ) : 1,771 Votes : 1.36%

● Jayvir Singh Shakya ( BJP ) : 1,508 Votes : 1.16%

Majority - 10,939 Votes : 8.39%

Turnout - 1,30,391 Votes : 61.79%

Registered Electors : 2,11,023 Voters

1993

1993 Uttar Pradesh Legislative Assembly Election

● Mulayam Singh Yadav ( SP ) : 60,242 Votes : 46.88%

● Darshan Singh Yadav ( INC ) : 59,081 Votes : 45.98%

● Sangh Priya Gautam ( BJP ) : 4,943 Votes : 3.85%

Majority - 1,161 Votes : 0.90%

Turnout - 1,28,495 Votes : 67.76%

Registered Electors : 1,89,633 Voters

1991

1991 Uttar Pradesh Legislative Assembly Election

● Mulayam Singh Yadav [ SJP(R) ] : 47,765 Votes : 45.96%

● Darshan Singh ( INC ) : 30,601 Votes : 29.44%

● Daya Shankar Shakya ( BJP ) : 17,199 Votes : 16.55%

● Ram Das Bajpayee ( IND ) : 1,027 Votes : 0.99%

Majority - 17,164 Votes : 16.52%

Turnout - 1,03,937 Votes : 58.84%

Registered Electors : 1,76,644 Voters

1989

1989 Uttar Pradesh Legislative Assembly Election

● Mulayam Singh Yadav ( JD ) : 65,597 Votes : 59.26%

● Darshan Singh ( INC ) : 39,160 Votes : 35.38%

● Radheyshyam Shakya ( BJP ) : 1,636 Votes : 1.48%

● Panna Lal ( IND ) : 1,569 Votes : 1.42%

Majority - 26,437 Votes : 23.88%

Turnout - 1,10,690 Votes : 62.99%

Registered Electors : 1,75,727 Voters

1985

1985 Uttar Pradesh Legislative Assembly Election

● Mulayam Singh Yadav ( LD ) : 49,390 Votes : 57.32%

● Shivraj Singh Yadav ( INC ) : 23,916 Votes : 27.75%

● Kailas Babu ( IND ) : 3,240 Votes : 3.76%

● Gorey Lal Shakya ( IND ) : 3,095 Votes : 3.59%

● Hori Lal ( DDP ) : 1,300 Votes : 1.51%

● Jaisi Rani ( JP ) : 1,257 Votes : 1.46%

Majority - 25,474 Votes : 29.57%

Turnout - 86,171 Votes : 56.08%

Registered Electors : 1,53,658 Voters

1980

1980 Uttar Pradesh Legislative Assembly Election

● Balram Singh Yadav [ INC(I) ] : 44,306 Votes : 51.06%

● Mulayam Singh Yadav [ JD(S) ] : 36,695 Votes : 42.29%

● Babu Ram ( JP ) : 1,518 Votes : 1.75%

● Banshidhar Shakya ( BJP ) : 1,184 Votes : 1.36%

Majority - 7,611 Votes : 8.77%

Turnout - 86,775 Votes : 66.24%

Registered Electors : 1,31,001 Voters

1977

1977 Uttar Pradesh Legislative Assembly Election

● Mulayam Singh Yadav ( JP ) : 41,985 Votes : 64.26%

● Gorey Lal Shakya ( IND ) : 15,523 Votes : 23.76%

● Megh Nath Yadav ( INC ) : 6,294 Votes : 9.63%

● Gyanendra Kumar Dubey ( RPK ) : 1,536 Votes : 2.35%

Majority - 26,262 Votes : 40.5%

Turnout - 65,338 Votes : 55.71%

Registered Electors : 1,17,283 Voters

1974

1974 Uttar Pradesh Legislative Assembly Election

● Mulayam Singh Yadav ( BKD ) : 31,587 Votes : 42.87%

● Bishambhar Singh Yadav ( INC ) : 17,329 Votes : 23.52%

● Amar Singh [ INC(O) ] : 13,316 Votes : 18.07%

● Gaya Prasad ( IND ) : 7,511 Votes : 10.19%

● Bibhuti Prasad ( BJS ) : 2,888 Votes : 3.92%

● Jas Ram ( SOP ) : 1,056 Votes : 1.43%

Majority - 14,258 Votes : 9.35%

Turnout - 73,687 Votes : 68.97%

Registered Electors : 1,06,839 Voters

1969

1969 Uttar Pradesh Legislative Assembly Election

● Bishambhar Singh Yadav ( INC ) : 24,559 Votes

● Mulayam Singh Yadav ( SSP ) : 19,282 Votes

1967

1967 Uttar Pradesh Legislative Assembly Election

● Mulayam Singh Yadav ( SSP ) : 21,990 Votes

● J.S.Lal ( RPI ) : 10,196 Votes

1962

1962 Uttar Pradesh Legislative Assembly Election

● Chaudhary Natthu Singh Yadav ( PSP ) : 12,045 Votes

● Bishambhar Singh ( INC ) : 11,306 Votes

1957

1957 Uttar Pradesh Legislative Assembly Election

● Abhe Ram ( IND ) : 17,851Votes

● Prabal Pratap Singh ( INC ) : 10,297 Votes
