= Pragatisheel Samajwadi Party (Lohiya) =

Indian political party (2018)

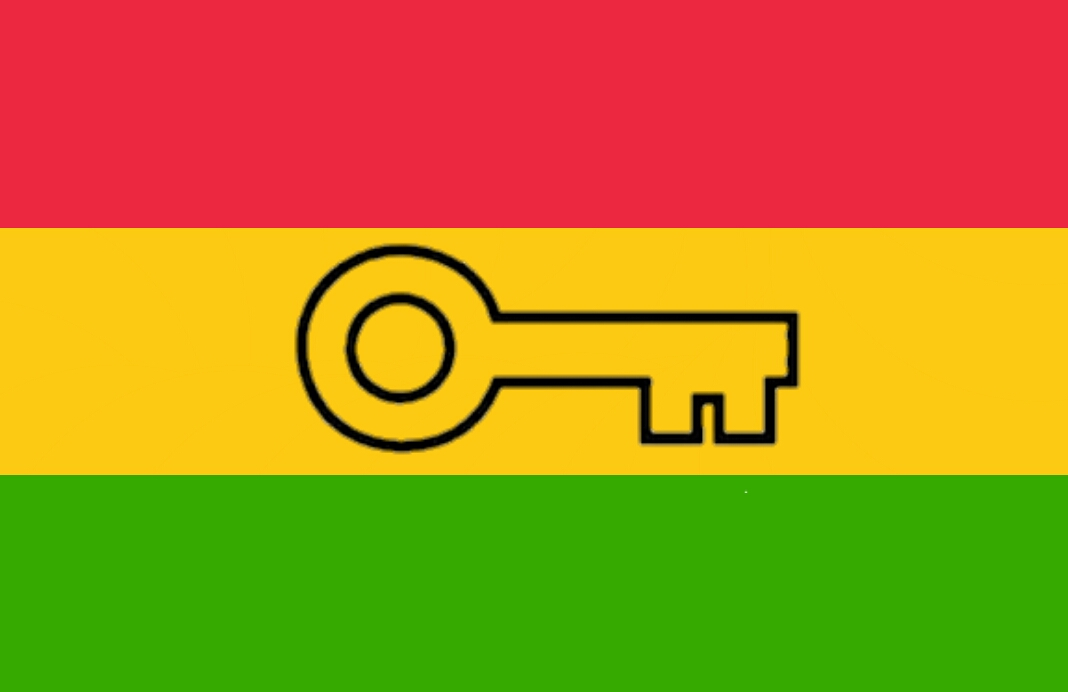
- Abbreviation: PSP(L)
- President: Shivpal Singh Yadav
- Founder: Shivpal Singh Yadav
- Founded: 29 August 2018 (8 years ago)
- Dissolved: 8 December 2022 (3 years ago)
- Split from: Samajwadi Party
- Merged into: Samajwadi Party
- Headquarters: Lucknow, Uttar Pradesh
- Ideology: Socialism; Secularism; Progressivism
- Political position: Left-wing
- Colours: Red; Yellow; Green
- ECI status: Registered
- Alliance: SP+ (2021-2022)
- Seats in Uttar Pradesh Legislative Assembly: 0 / 403

Election symbol
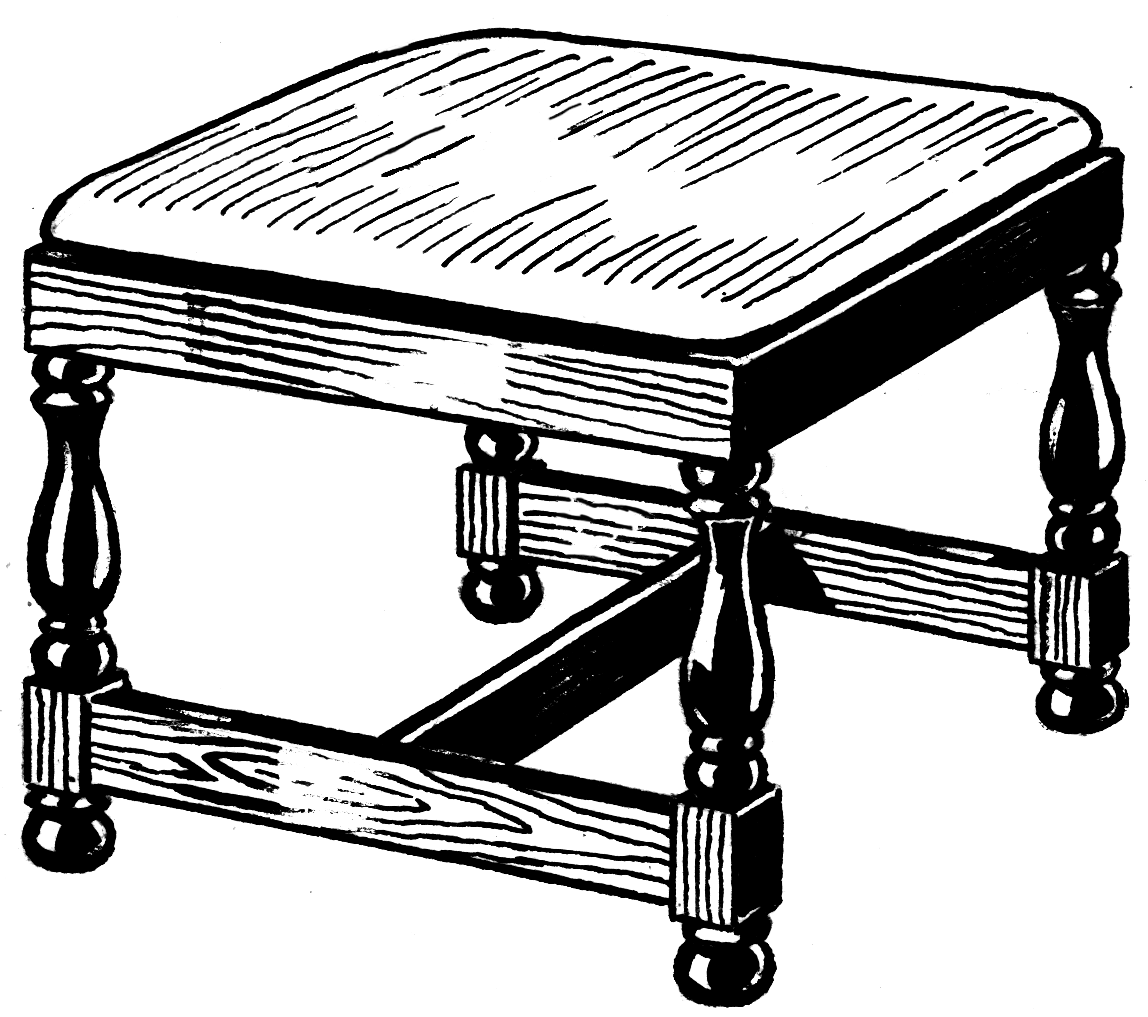

Website
- pragatisheelsamajwadiparty.org

Pragatisheel Samajwadi Party (Lohia) (translation: Progressive Socialist Party (Lohia)), earlier known as Samajwadi Secular Morcha, was a political party formed by former cabinet minister of Uttar Pradesh Shivpal Singh Yadav after leaving the Samajwadi Party on 29 August 2018. He has stated that he decided to form the Pragatisheel Samajwadi Party (Lohia) to retain socialist values. The Pragatisheel Samajwadi Party is a political party registered by the Election Commission. The camp office is located in Lucknow, capital city of Uttar Pradesh. The permanent office is situated in Gomti Nagar, Lucknow.

== Election symbol ==
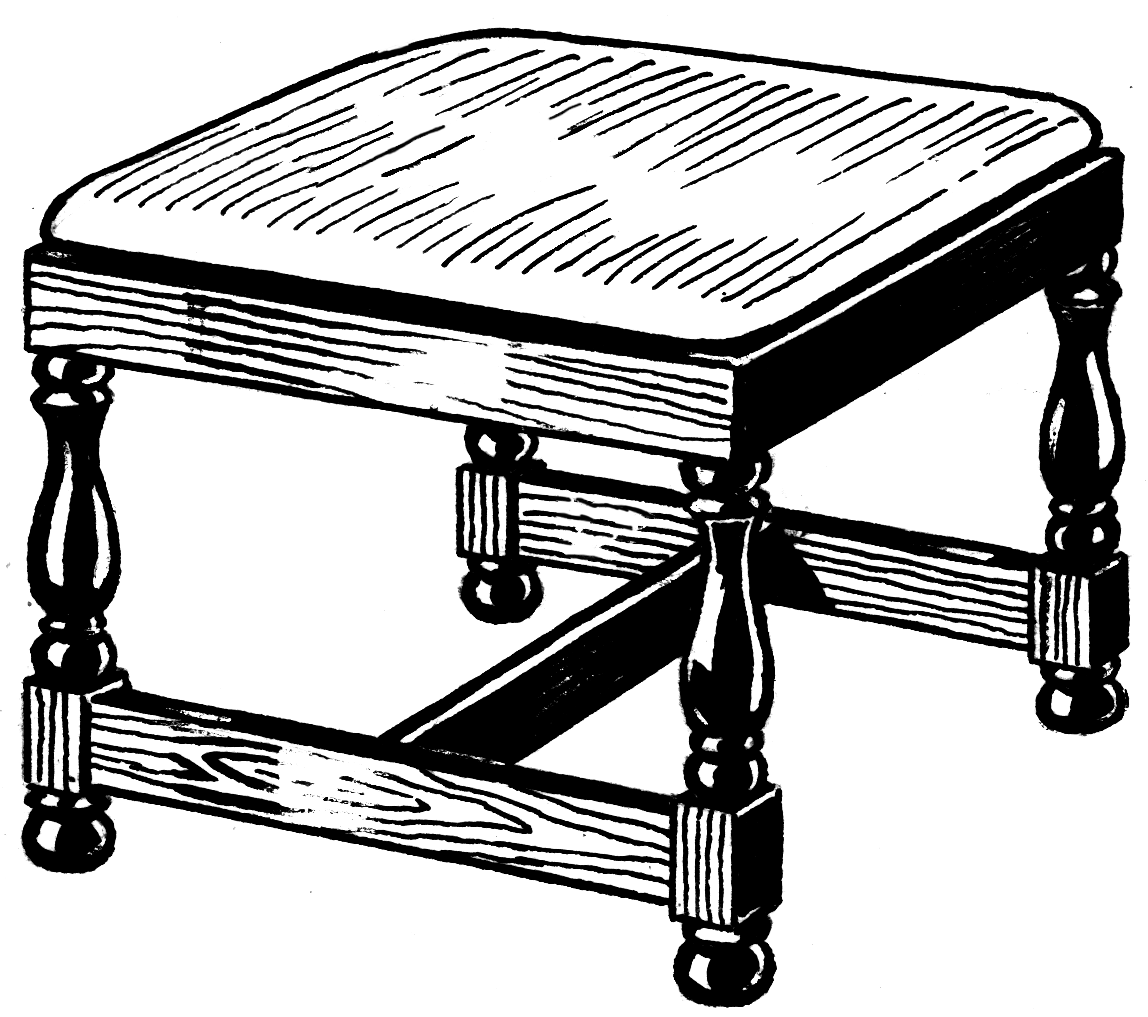

The party had been officially assigned the "Key" for its symbol for contesting elections of 2019 which was changed into "Stool" just before elections of 2022. Though PSP president Shivpal Singh Yadav has announced to fight the 2022 assembly election on the bicycle, the symbol of Samajwadi Party.

== Party flag ==
The red colour symbolizes socialism, the yellow colour is the symbol of expectation and the green colour is the symbol of coordination and prosperity.

In this way, the flag symbolizes expectation achieving physical prosperity by binding the society with socialism.
