= Hajari Mahadev Temple =

Hindu temple in Sarsai Nawar, UP, India

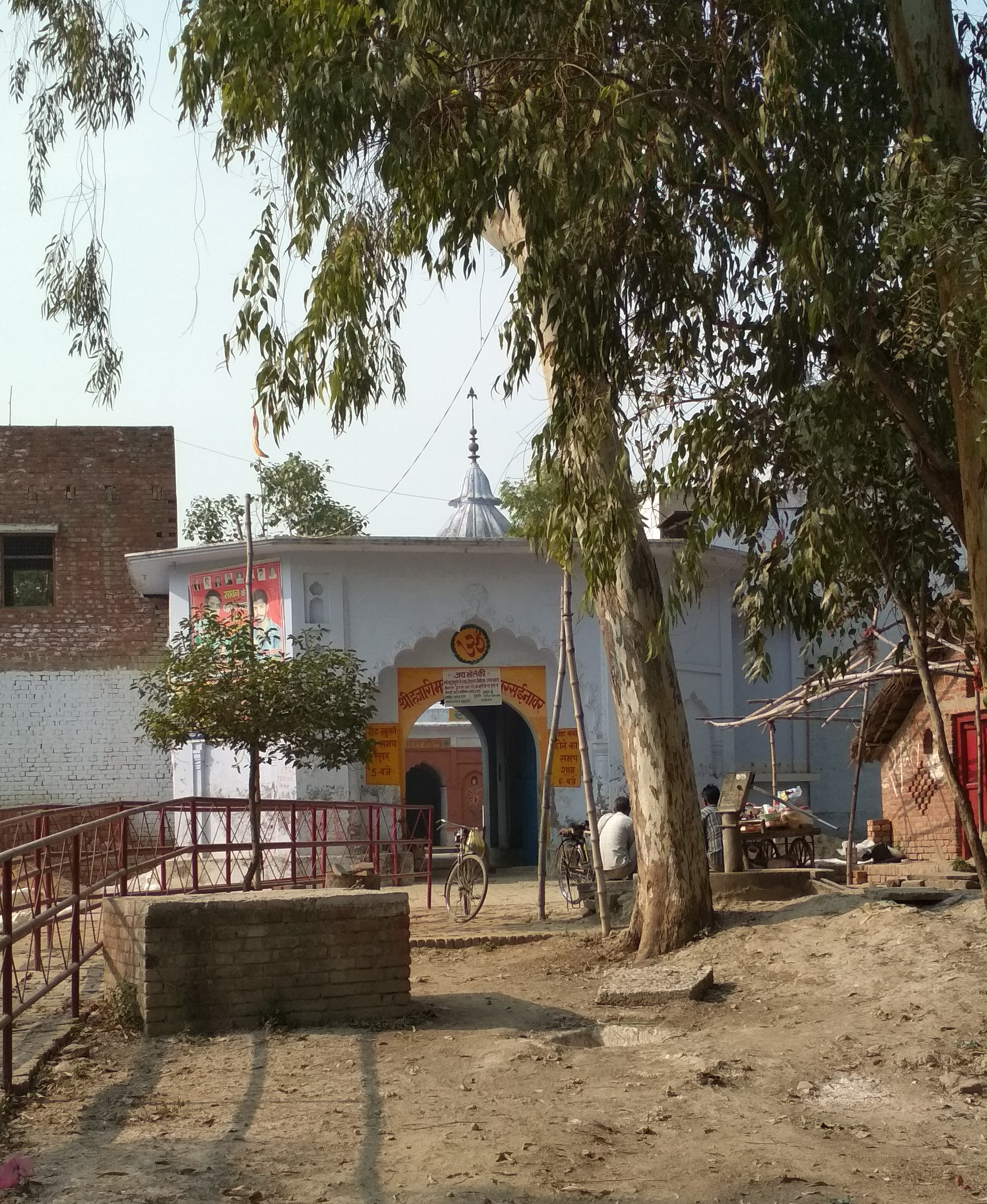
- Hajari Mahadev Temple, Sarsai Nawar at night, entrance gate

Religion
- Affiliation: Hinduism
- District: Etawah district
- Deity: Shiva

Location
- Location: Sarsai Nawar
- State: Uttar Pradesh
- Country: India

Hajari Mahadev Mandir or Hajari Mahadev temple is a Hindu temple. dedicated to Lord Shiva, located in the town of Sarsai Nawar, about 4 km from Etawah district, Uttar Pradesh, India.

== Temple ==
The temple is various Devas the Mahabharat Period. Pandav Setup in the form of Shivalinga is the presiding deity of the temple. Mela Festival At Hajari Mahadev Temple Sarsai Nawar.
