= Janta College =

College in Uttar Pradesh, India

- Type: Govt. Aided College
- Established: 1959
- Academic affiliations: Chhatrapati Shahu Ji Maharaj University
- Location: Bakewar, Etawah, Uttar Pradesh, India; 26.66170°N 79.17230°E
- Campus: Bakewar
- Website: https://www.jcbakewar.org.in/

Janta College is a college in Bakewar, Etawah district, Uttar Pradesh, India. It is affiliated to Chhatrapati Shahu Ji Maharaj University (formerly Kanpur University).

== Notable alumni ==
- Premdas Katheria, former Member of Parliament
