= Bakewar =

- Town
- Location in Uttar Pradesh, India Bakewar (India)
- Coordinates: 26.67°N 79.18°E
- Country: India
- State: Uttar Pradesh
- District: Etawah

Area
  - Total: 2.24 km^{2} (0.86 sq mi)
- Elevation: 142 m (466 ft)

Population (2001)
  - Total: 13,053
  - Density: 5,830/km^{2} (15,100/sq mi)

Languages
  - Official: Hindi
- Time zone: UTC+5:30 (IST)
- Postal code: 206124
- Vehicle registration: u.p75
- Website: up.gov.in

Bakewar is a town and a nagar panchayat in Etawah district in the state of Uttar Pradesh, India. It is 22 km from district headquarters Etawah. Bakewar is famous for its very good education system, Agriculture Training Institute and for National highway no. 2. Bakewar is situated at national highway no. 2 (Mughal Road). It is between Agra and Kanpur, the two biggest cities of Uttar Pradesh. Agra is 145 km north and Kanpur is 135 km on south of Bakewar. Bharthana is the nearest railway (11 km) of Bakewar, situated in the east.

== Geography ==
Bakewar is located at 26.67°N 79.18°E. It has an average elevation of 142 metres (465 feet).

== Demographics ==
As of 2001's India census, Bakewar had a population of 13,053. Males constitute 53% of the population and females 47%. Bakewar has an average literacy rate of 59%, lower than the national average of 79.9%; with 69% of the males and 54% of females literate. 18% of the population is under 6 years of age.

== College ==
- Janta College Bakewar, Etawah
- Janta Inter

College, Bakewar

- Babu ram sarasvati gyan mandir inter college

== Places of interest ==
- Van Khandeshvar Mahadev (Old Historical Temple of Lord Shiva) located at National Highway near Power House.. Lord Shiva Ling in temple is more than five thousand years old. Lord Shiva Ling in temple was exist at the time of Mahabharata which was founded by Shri Bhima (2nd Son of Pandav) before fighting with Bakasur.

In the Hindu epic Mahabharata, Bakasura, (also called Bakasur or Bakasuran) (बकासुर) is a Rakshasa (demon) killed by Bhima. The demon lived in Bakewar, and forced the king to send him daily a large quantity of provisions, which he devoured, and not only the provisions, but the men who carried them. Under the directions of Kunti, her son Bhima was sent to Bakasura for his food. Before victory on Bakasur Shri Bhima himself perform Pooja here and after a long battle Shri Bhima killed Bakasur.

- Maghai a huge pond called Maghai covered two-thirds of town Bakewar and it provides security to peoples of Bakewar by antisocial elements. As per people during the fight between Shri Bhima and Bakasur lot of big potholes were originated, during a period of long time it has become a big pond known as Maghai. People of Bakewar believe that Maghai is a symbol of battle of Shree Bhima and Bakasur.
- Temple Of Devi Sati located at one KM on Bharthana Road. Devi Sati temple is the symbol Of faith of the people's of Bakewar and many other villages near about.
- Temple of Maa Kalka Devi located at 3 km on Lakhna road. Maa Kalka Devi Temple is to old when pandavas are live on earth. In Navratra's many people come here to do worship of Maa Kalka Devi Temple. A pound is here which called Pakka Talab before worship of Maa Kalka Devi people bath here and some people doing Mundan here of his new born baby first time.
