= Jaswantnagar =

- Town
- Location in Uttar Pradesh, India
- Coordinates: 26.88°N 78.9°E
- Country: India
- State: Uttar Pradesh
- District: Etawah

Government
  - MLA (Jaswantnagar constituency): Shivpal Singh Yadav (Samajwadi Party)
  - MP (Mainpuri constituency): Dimple Yadav
- Elevation: 133 m (436 ft)

Population (2011)
  - Total: 28,164

Languages
  - Official: Hindi
- Time zone: UTC+5:30 (IST)
- Vehicle registration: UP-75

Jaswantnagar is a town and a municipal board in Etawah district in the Indian state of Uttar Pradesh.

== Demographics ==
As of 2001 India census, Jaswantnagar had a population of 25,346. Males constitute 53% of the population and females 47%. Jaswantnagar has an average literacy rate of 62%, lower than the national average of 65%: male literacy is 68%, and female literacy is 55%. In Jaswantnagar, 17% of the population is under 6 years of age. It has big village Dhanuan 9 km from Jaswantnagar
