= Lakhna =

- town
- Location in Uttar Pradesh, India
- Coordinates: 26.65°N 79.15°E
- Country: India
- State: Uttar Pradesh
- District: Etawah
- Elevation: 143 m (469 ft)

Population (2001)
  - Total: 10,452

Languages
  - Official: Hindi
- Time zone: UTC+5:30 (IST)
- PIN: 206127

Lakhna is a town and a nagar panchayat in Etawah district in the Indian state of Uttar Pradesh.

== Geography ==
Lakhna has an average elevation of 143 metres (469 ft). It is famous for a Kalika Devi mandir and wholesale market for agriculture produce, also for jewellery shops. Kalika Devi mandir is famous for social rituals. It is well connected to Etawah through roads. Kanpur and Gwalior are nearby airports from Lakhna

== Demographics ==
As of 2001 India census, Lakhna had a population of 10,452. Males constitute 52% of the population and females 48%. Lakhna has an average literacy rate of 69%, higher than the national average of 59.5%: male literacy is 73%, and female literacy is 64%. In Lakhna, 15% of the population is under 6 years of age.
