= Sarsaina =

Sarsaina Sarsaina-Halena
- Village
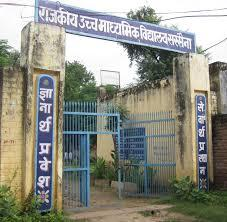
- Govt Sr. Sec. School Sarsaina

- Location in Rajasthan, India Sarsaina (India)
- Country: India
- State: Rajasthan
- District: Bharatpur
- Tehsil: Weir

Population (2011)
  - Total: 5,500

Languages
  - Official: Hindi
- Time zone: UTC+5:30 (IST)
- PIN: 321642
- Vehicle registration: RJ 05

Sarsaina or Sarsena is a village in Weir Tehsil of Bharatpur District in the Indian state of Rajasthan. It is located near Halena at Jaipur- Agra National Highway 21. According to Census 2011 Sarsena has a population of 5090 with about 900 families.

== Religion ==
Hindus are in majority in this village. There are several temples in this village. A few of them are :

- Angadiya Mandir, Dedicated to Shri Hanuman ji
- Jugalkishor ji Mandir, Dedicated to Shri Radha Krishna ji
- Devnarayan Mandir, Dedicated to folk God Shri Devnarayan ji

== Geography ==
- It is arranged 16 km away from Tehsil Weir and 41 km away from District headquarter Bharatpur. According to 2011 details, Sarsaina or Sarsena village is additionally a gram panchayat.
- The complete topographical territory of village is 1024.66 hectares. There are around 900 houses in Sarsaina. According to 2019 details, Sarsena goes under Weir tehsil and Bharatpur parliamentary voting demographic. Nadbai is the closest town to Sarsena which is roughly 12 km away.

== Politics ==
- Sarpanch: Pushpendra Singh
- MLA: Mr. Bahadur Singh Koli (Weir)
- MP : Mrs. Sanjana Jatav (Bharatpur)
