= Krantikari Morcha =

Defunct political party in India

Krantikari Morcha ('Revolutionary Front') was a political coalition in the Indian state of Uttar Pradesh. It was launched by Mulayam Singh Yadav in 1987, as Yadav led a split in the Lok Dal. Mulayam's Lok Dal faction managed to get the Communist Party of India, the Communist Party of India (Marxist), Chandra Shekar's Janata Party, the Janwadi Party and Maneka Gandhi's Rashtriya Sanjay Manch.
