= Shivpal Singh Yadav =

Indian politician (born 1955)

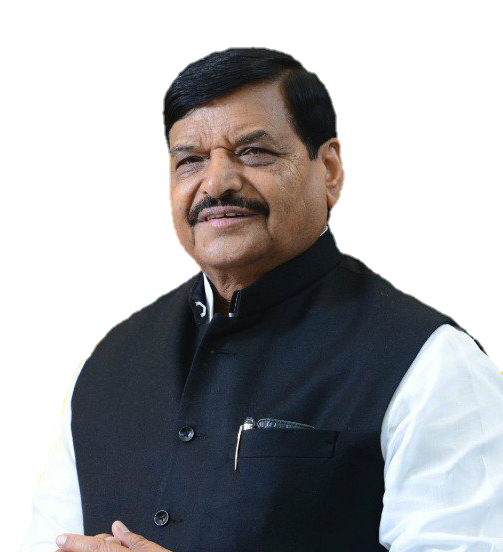
- Yadav in 2022

Member of Uttar Pradesh Legislative Assembly
- Incumbent
- Assumed office 17 October 1996
- Preceded by: Mulayam Singh Yadav
- Constituency: Jaswantnagar

Cabinet Minister in Uttar Pradesh
- In office 15 March 2012 – 24 October 2016
- Chief Minister: Akhilesh Yadav
- In office 6 September 2003 – 11 May 2007
- Chief Minister: Mulayam Singh Yadav

President of Samajwadi Party, Uttar Pradesh
- In office 13 September 2016 – 1 January 2017
- Preceded by: Akhilesh Yadav
- Succeeded by: Naresh Uttam Patel
- In office 6 January 2009 – 4 June 2009
- Preceded by: Ram Sharan Das
- Succeeded by: Akhilesh Yadav

State Incharge of Samajwadi Party, Uttar Pradesh
- In office 12 April 2016 – 13 September 2016
- Preceded by: Office established
- Succeeded by: Office abolished

Leader of the Opposition in Uttar Pradesh Legislative Assembly
- In office 26 May 2009 – 9 March 2012
- Preceded by: Mulayam Singh Yadav
- Succeeded by: Swami Prasad Maurya

President of Pragatisheel Samajwadi Party (Lohiya)
- In office 28 August 2018 – 10 December 2022
- Preceded by: Office established
- Succeeded by: Office abolished

Personal details
- Born: 16 February 1955 (age 71) Saifai, Uttar Pradesh, India
- Party: Samajwadi Party (1992–2017; since 2022)
- Other political affiliations: Independent (2017-2018); Samajwadi Secular Morcha (2018); Pragatisheel Samajwadi Party (Lohiya) (2018-2022)
- Spouse: Sarla Yadav (m. 1981)
- Relations: Mulayam Singh Yadav (brother); Ram Gopal Yadav (cousin); Akhilesh Yadav (nephew); Dimple Yadav (daughter-in-law); Dharmendra Yadav (nephew); Akshay Yadav (nephew); Tej Pratap Singh Yadav (grand-nephew)
- Children: 2 (1 son & 1 daughter; including Aditya Yadav)
- Education: K.K. P.G. College, Etawah; Kanpur University (B.A., 1976), Lucknow Christian College; University of Lucknow (B.P.Ed., 1977)

Shivpal Singh Yadav (born 16 February 1955) is an Indian politician and educationist from Uttar Pradesh. He was born in Saifai village, Etawah district, and is a younger brother of Samajwadi Party founder Mulayam Singh Yadav and uncle of the former Chief Minister of Uttar Pradesh, Akhilesh Yadav. He is a member of the Uttar Pradesh Legislative Assembly, representing the Jaswantnagar seat in Etawah district since 1996. He is also the National General Secretary of Samajwadi Party and was appointed on 29 January 2023.

In 2018, he founded his own party named Pragatisheel Samajwadi Party (Lohiya), which was merged into Samajwadi Party in 2022.

== Early life and education ==
Shivpal Singh Yadav was born on 16 February 1955 in Saifai village, Etawah district to Sughar Singh Yadav and Murti Devi. He has studied in Kanpur University's K.K. P.G. College, Etawah and University of Lucknow's Lucknow Christian College and earned BA (1976) and BPEd (1977) degrees respectively.

=== Family ===
Shivpal is the youngest among 5 brothers. Ratan Singh Yadav, Mulayam Singh Yadav, Abhay Ram Yadav and Rajpal Singh Yadav are his elder brothers. He has a sister, Kamla Devi Yadav.

Rajya Sabha MP Ram Gopal Yadav and his sister Geeta Yadav are his cousins.

== Career ==
Yadav was the leader of the opposition in Uttar Pradesh Assembly since 2007 during the Mayawati regime. He contested Firozabad in 2019, but he came third.

== Positions held ==
Shivpal Singh Yadav has served 6 times as MLA. He lost the 17th Lok Sabha election from Firozabad in 2019.

#	From	To	Position	Party
1.	1996	2002	MLA (1st term) from Jaswantnagar	SP
2.	2002	2007	MLA (2nd term) from Jaswantnagar	SP
3.	2007	2012	MLA (3rd term) from Jaswantnagar	SP
4.	2012	2017	MLA (4th term) from Jaswantnagar	SP
5.	2017	2022	MLA (5th term) from Jaswantnagar	SP
6.	2022	Present	MLA (6th term) from Jaswantnagar	SP

== Personal life ==
Shivpal Singh Yadav is married to Sarla Yadav since 1981 and they have a son Aditya Yadav and daughter Dr. Anubha Yadav. Anubha's husband Ajay Yadav is an IAS officer of 2010 batch and Tamil Nadu cadre.His son Aditya Yadav was elected as the Member of Parliament from Budaun in the 18th Lok Sabha (2024).
