= Bharthana =

- Town, Urban
- Location in Uttar Pradesh, India
- Coordinates: 26.75°N 79.23°E
- Country: India
- State: Uttar Pradesh
- District: Etawah
- Elevation: 135 m (443 ft)

Population (2021)
  - Total: 150,000

Languages
  - Official: Hindi
- Time zone: UTC+5:30 = (IST)
- PIN: 206242
- Telephone code: 05680
- Vehicle registration: UP75

Bharthana is a town and a municipal board in Etawah district in the state of Uttar Pradesh, India. Bharthana is located at 26.75°N 79.23°E. It has an average elevation of 135 metres (442 feet).

== Demographics ==
As of 2021 India census, Bharthana had a population of 150000. Males constitute 52% of the population and females 48%. Bharthana has an average literacy rate of 72%, higher than the national average of 59.5%; with male literacy of 77% and female literacy of 66%. 15% of the population is under 6 years of age.
