= Aheripur =

Village in India

- Village
- Location within Uttar Pradesh Location within India
- Coordinates: 26.621373°N 79.2301369°E
- Country: India
- State: Uttar Pradesh
- District: Etawah
- Subdistrict: Mahewa

Population (2011)
  - Total: 6,411

Languages
  - Official: Hindi & English
- Time zone: UTC+05:30 (IST)
- Pincode: 206120
- Telephone code: 05680
- Vehicle registration: UP 75

Aheripur is a village in the Etawah district of Uttar Pradesh, India. The population was 6,411 at the 2011 Indian census. It has a very old Shri Bihariji Intercollege and numerous private and government primary schools.
