= Sarsai Nawar Wetland =

Bird watching area in Uttar Pradesh, India

- Location within Uttar Pradesh Location within India
- Interactive map of Sarsai Nawar Wetland
- Location: Sarsai Nawar, Etawah, Uttar Pradesh, India
- Nearest city: Etawah
- Coordinates: 26°58′00″N 79°14′48″E
- Governing body: Uttar Pradesh Government
Designations
Ramsar Wetland
- Official name: Sarsai Nawar Jheel
- Designated: 19 September 2019
- Reference no.: 2411

Sarsai Nawar Wetland, also known as Sarsai Nawar Jheel, is a bird sanctuary in Sarsai Nawar, Etawah district, Uttar Pradesh, India. It aims to conserve waterbirds, notably the Sarus Crane. It has been designated as a protected Ramsar site since 2019.

== Gallery ==
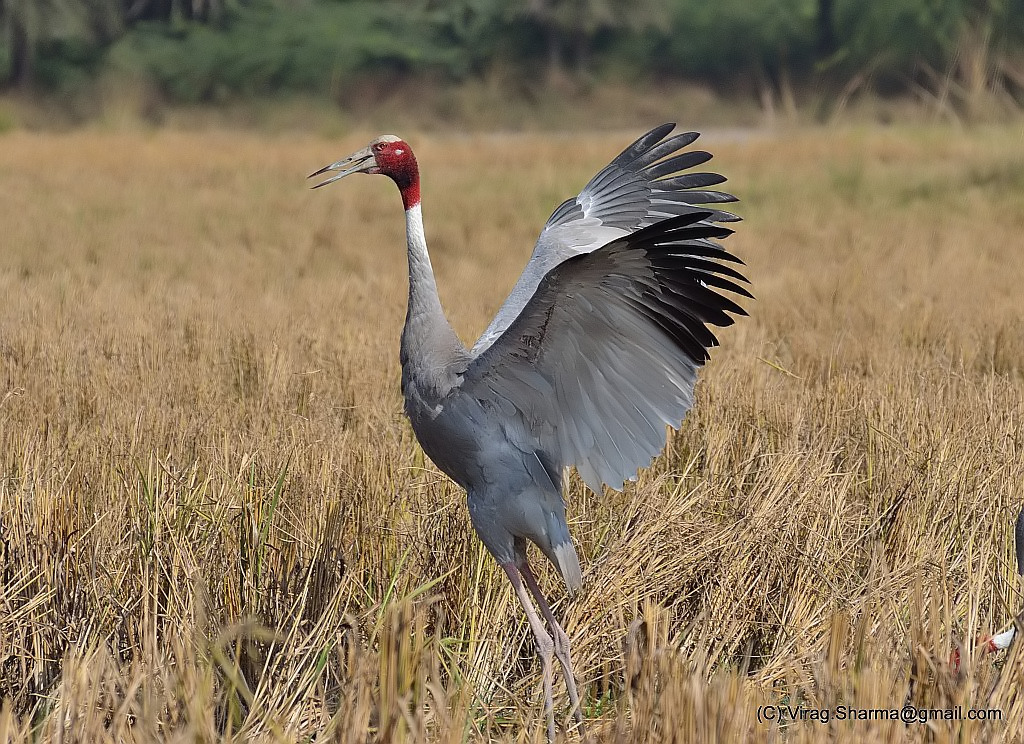
Sarus crane

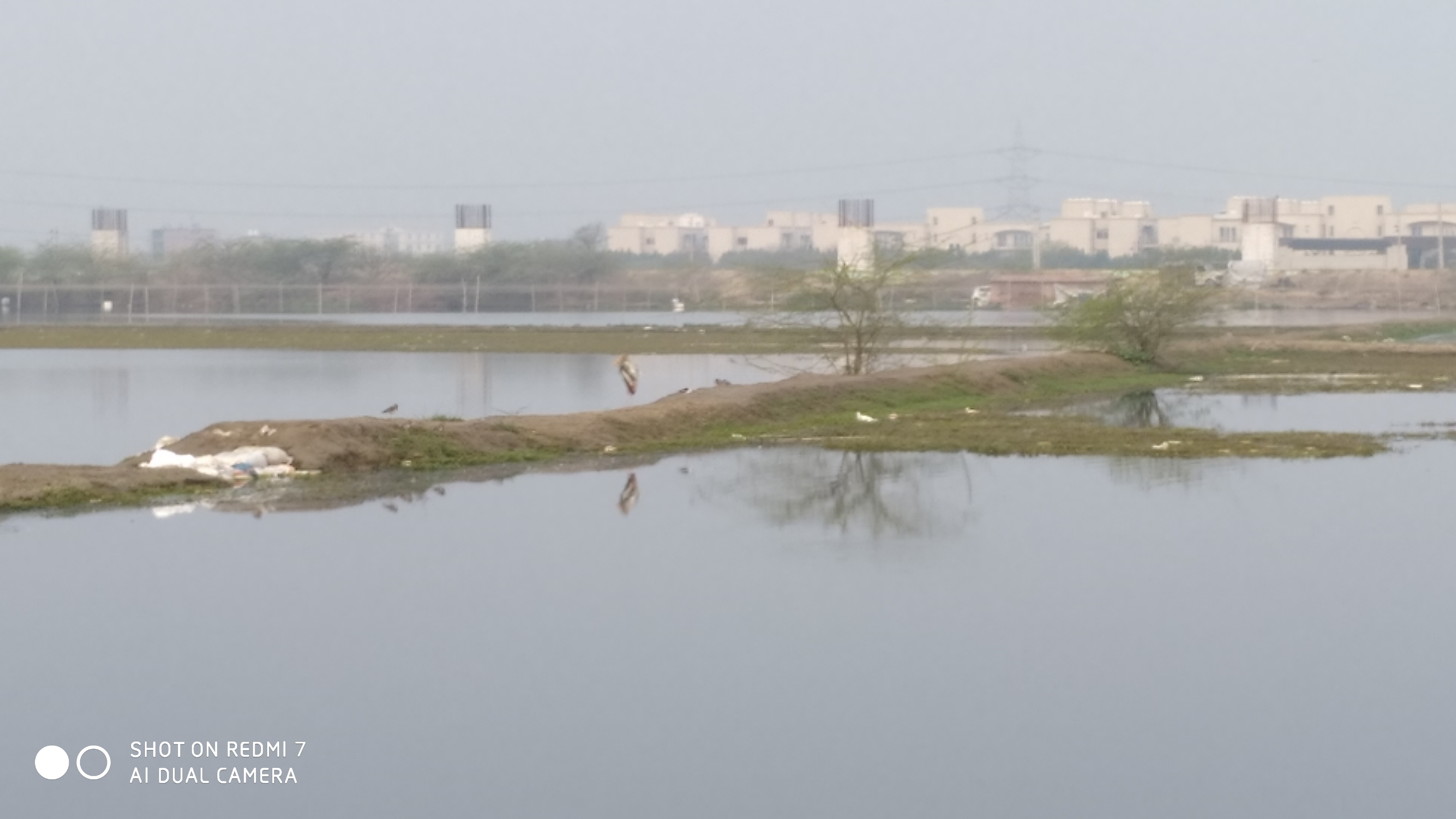
Bird Sanctuary

== See also ==
- Saman Bird Sanctuary
- Etawah Safari Park
- Dhanauri Wetlands
- Basai Wetland
