= Kachhpura =

Village in Uttar Pradesh, India

- Village
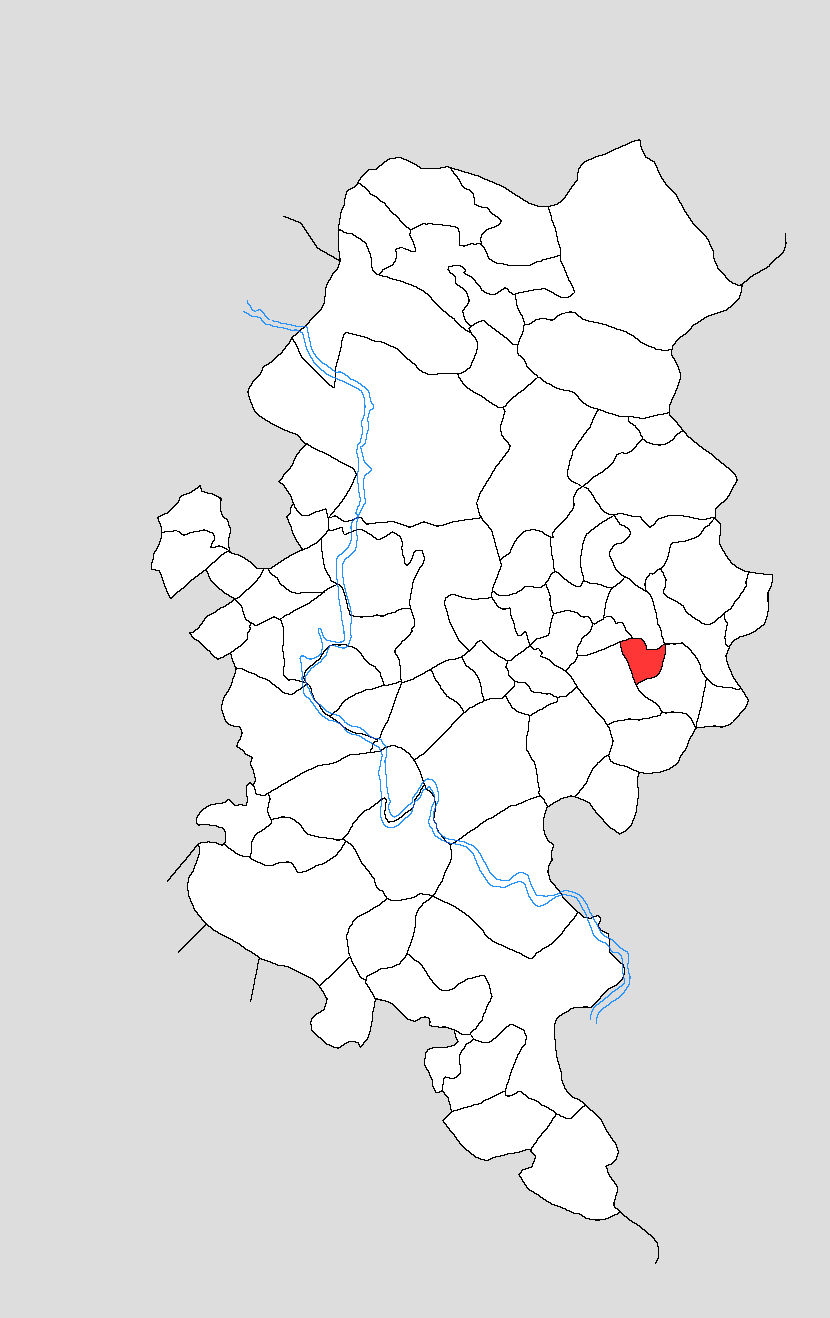
- Map showing Kachhpura in Kotla block

- Location in Uttar Pradesh, India
- Coordinates: 27.27309°N 78.45675°E
- Country: India
- State: Uttar Pradesh
- District: Firozabad
- Tehsil: Firozabad

Area
  - Total: 0.209 km^{2} (0.081 sq mi)

Population (2011)
  - Total: 827
  - Density: 3,960/km^{2} (10,200/sq mi)
- Time zone: UTC+5:30 (IST)
- PIN: 283203

Kachhpura (Kachhpurā) is a village in the Kotla block of Firozabad district, Uttar Pradesh. As of 2011, it has a population of 827, in 154 households.

== Demographics ==
As of 2011, Kachhpura had a population of 827, in 154 households. This population was 55.7% male (461) and 44.3% female (366). The 0-6 age group numbered 138 (75 male and 63 female), making up 16.7% of the total population. 50 residents were members of Scheduled Castes, or 6.0% of the total.

The 1981 census recorded Kachhpura as having a population of 416 people (234 male and 182 female), in 74 households and 74 physical houses.

The 1961 census recorded Kachhpura as comprising 1 hamlet, with a total population of 287 people (158 male and 129 female), in 46 households and 30 physical houses. The area of the village was given as 52 acres.

== Infrastructure ==
As of 2011, Kachhpura had one primary school; it did not have any healthcare facilities. Drinking water was provided by tap, hand pump, and tube well/borehole; there were no public toilets. The village had a public library but no post office; there was at least some access to electricity for all purposes. Streets were made of both kachcha and pakka materials.
