= Ekdil =

Village in Etawah, Uttar Pradesh, India

Ekdil Sarai Ekdil
- Town
- Location in Uttar Pradesh, India
- Coordinates: 26°45′05″N 79°05′27″E
- Country: India
- State: Uttar Pradesh
- District: Etawah

Government
  - Type: Panchayat raj
  - Body: Nagar panchayat

Population (2011)
  - Total: 11,310

Languages
  - Official: Hindi
- Time zone: UTC+5:30 (IST)
- Postal code: 206126
- Vehicle registration: up75

Ekdil is a town and a nagar panchayat in Etawah district in the Indian state of Uttar Pradesh.

== History ==
Ekdil was established by the Ekdil Khan. It was earlier known as Sarai Rupa. In the 17th century, a eunuch named Ekdil Khan came there, and built a new sarai, which he named Ekdil. At the time of Mahabharata, Ekdil was part of Ishtikapuri.

== Geography ==
It lies between Yamuna At its south around 10km and Ganga river at its North around 50km. Nearby places:

- Bakewar, 12 km
- Bharthana, 14 km
- Etawah, 9 km
- Jaswantnagar, 28 km
- Lakhna, 16 km
- Saifai, 32 km

== Demographics ==
As of 2001 India census, Ekdil had a population of 11310. Males constitute 53% of the population and females 47%. Ekdil has an average literacy rate of 55%, lower than the national average of 59.5%: male literacy is 63%, and female literacy is 46%. In Ekdil, 17% of the population is under 6 years of age.

It has majority population of 79% of Hindus and compromise approx 21% of Muslims.

== Transport ==
=== Road ===
Ekdil is connected by road via NH 2. It lies on the northern side of NH 2. Kanpur, Agra, Delhi, Lucknow are via daily UPSRTC Buses.

=== Rail ===
- Ekdil railway station

=== Airports ===
- Gwalior Airport (99.8 kilometers)
- Kanpur Airport (131.0 kilometers)
- Lucknow Chaudhary Charan Singh Airport (178.5 kilometers)
- Delhi Indira Gandhi International Airport (282.2 kilometers)
- Agra Airport (approximately 120 km)
