= Saifai Airstrip =

Saifai Airstrip सैफई हवाई पट्टी
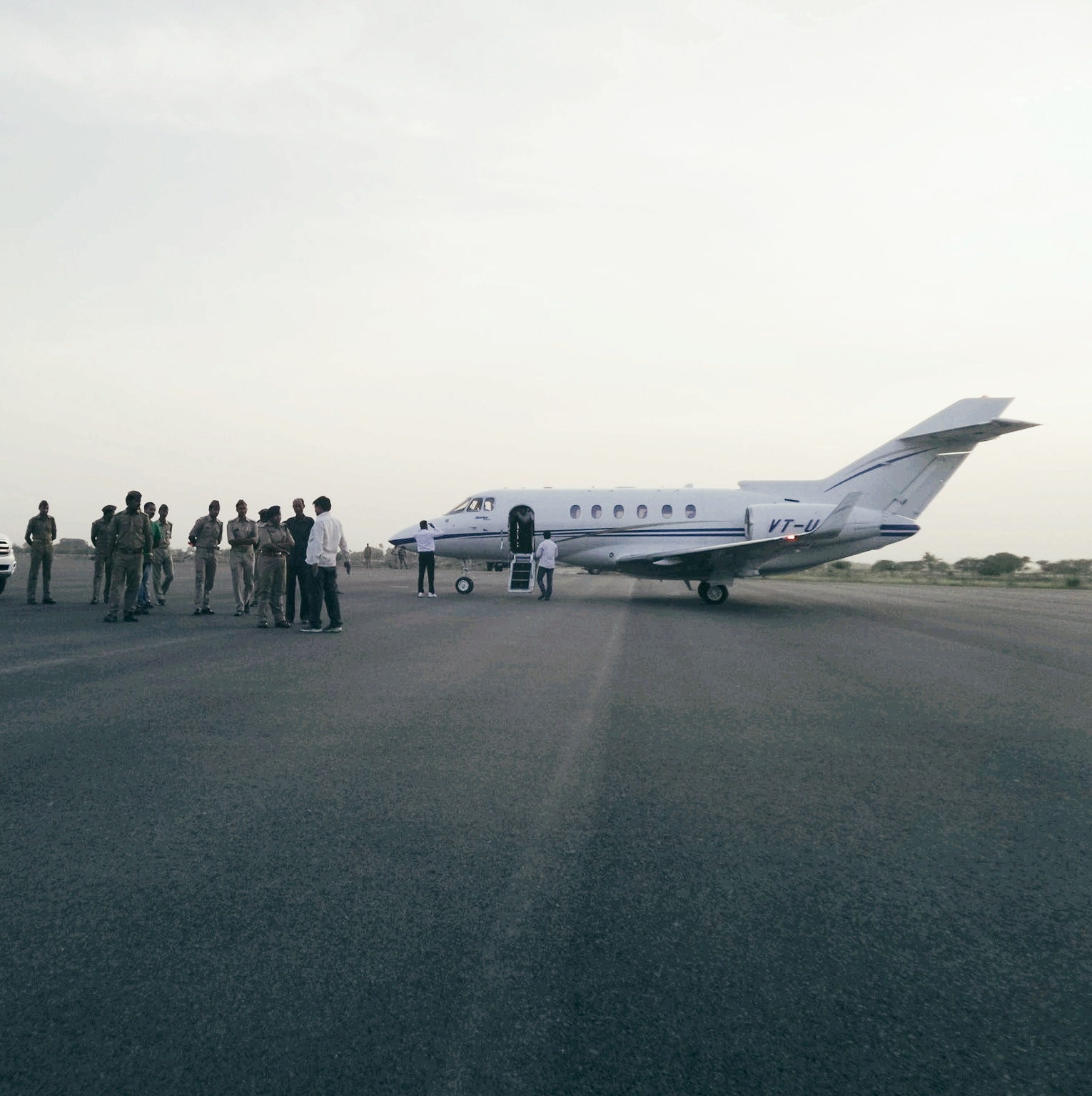
- Hawker 900XP of Uttar Pradesh Government at Saifai Airstrip (2016)
- IATA: none; ICAO: VI00

Summary
- Airport type: Public
- Owner: Civil Aviation Department (Government of Uttar Pradesh)
- Operator: Civil Aviation Department (Government of Uttar Pradesh)
- Serves: Saifai, Etawah
- Location: Saifai tehsil, Etawah, Uttar Pradesh, India
- Opened: 1997 (29 years ago)
- Time zone: Indian Standard Time (+5:30)
- Elevation AMSL: 335 ft (102 m)
- Coordinates: 26.9295847°N 79.0537360°E
- Website: civilaviation.up.nic.in/airstrip.html

Maps
- Location of airport in Uttar Pradesh
- Interactive map of Saifai Airstrip

Runways
Direction	Length		Surface
Direction	ft	m	Surface
15/33	8,202.1	2,500	Asphalt

The Saifai Airstrip is an airstrip in Saifai tehsil of Etawah District, Uttar Pradesh with only unscheduled chartered flights. This airstrip has an existing land area of 370 acres and it is suitable for Airbus A320/Boeing 737 with turning pads at both ends.

== Airlines and destinations ==
The airport/airstrip has only unscheduled chartered flights.

== Indian Air Force practice exercises ==
=== 2015 ===
In 2015, Mirage 2000 aircraft of Indian Air Force performed emergency situation tests from the airstrip.

=== 2018 ===
In 2018, Indian Air Force did their second practice exercise at Saifai Airstrip during operation Gagan Shakti 2018.

== Testing Airfield of LAT Aerospace ==
Saifai Airstrip is also used by LAT Aerospace for testing in 2026.
