= Etawah district =

Coordinates: 26°47′24″N 79°01′12″E

- District of Uttar Pradesh
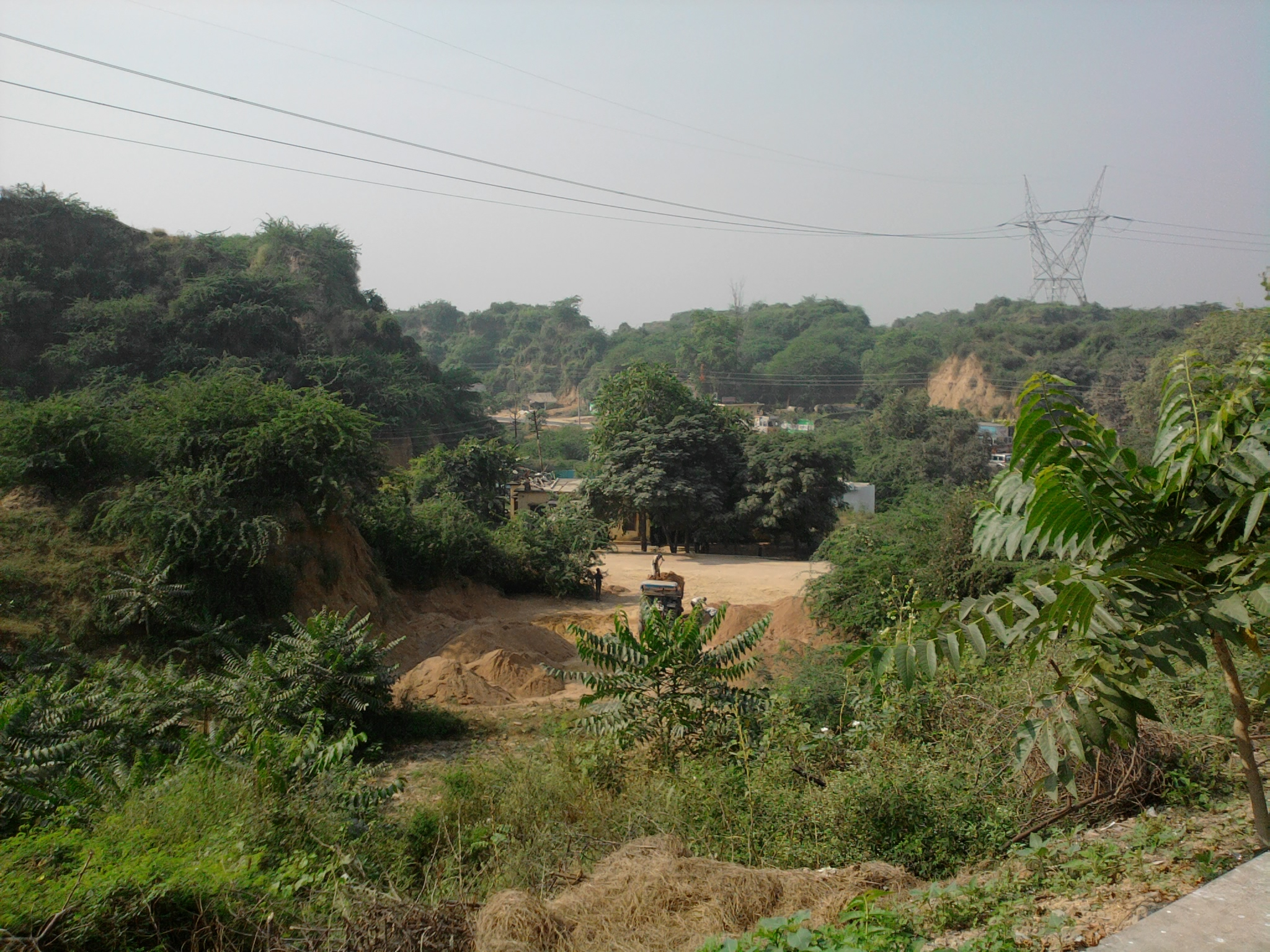
- Ravines near Etawah

- Interactive map of Etawah district
- Country: India
- State: Uttar Pradesh
- Division: Kanpur
- Headquarters: Etawah
- Tehsils: Tehsil Sadar Etawah, Bharthana, Jaswantnagar, Chakar Nagar, Saifai, Takha

Government
  - Lok Sabha constituencies: Etawah, Mainpuri
  - Vidhan Sabha constituencies: Jaswantnagar Bharthana And Etawah

Area
  - Total: 2,311 km^{2} (892 sq mi)

Population (2011)
  - Total: 1,581,810
  - Density: 684.5/km^{2} (1,773/sq mi)
  - Urban: Etawah Bharthana Saifai Jaswantnagar Bakewar Sarsai Nawar Mahewa
- Time zone: UTC+05:30 (IST)
- Vehicle registration: UP-75
- Major highways: NH 19, Agra–Lucknow Expressway, NH 719 & State Highway 83
- Airport: Saifai Airstrip
- Average annual precipitation: 792 mm
- Website: http://etawah.nic.in/

Etawah district is one of the districts in the western portion of Uttar Pradesh state of India. Etawah town is the district headquarters. The district covers an area of 2311 km^{2}. It has a population of 1,581,810.

== History ==
=== Ancient period ===
Etawah shares much of the same history as the middle Doab. Originally this district was part of the Panchala Mahajanapada, home of Draupadi in the Mahabharata. During the time of the Buddha Panchala was one of the 16 Mahajanapadas, with Alavi, identified with Airwa in neighbouring Auraiya district, as an important centre of learning which lasted into the 6th century. The region fell under the rule of the Nandas, Maurays, Shungas and Kanvas. After the Kanvas, the district was eventually ruled by the Mitras, who became feudatories of the Kushanas, and after Kushana downfall, the Nagas in the 3rd and 4th centuries CE. Eventually the region came under Gupta rule, and prospered. After the fall of the later Guptas, the region fell under the rule of Kannauj and the dynasties which controlled that city, beginning from the Maukharis, Pushyabhutis and later the Gurjara-Pratiharas and Gahadavala dynasty. After Muhammad Ghori's defeat of Jayachandra Etawah fell under Muslim rule.

=== Medieval and Mughal period ===
During the early years of the 13th century, the Muslims exercised very little real control over the district, and the region mostly witnessed the settlement of various Rajput clans: the Parihars in the Panchnada region, the Bhadaurias and Dhakras between the Yamuna and Chambal, and the Chauhans in the west of the present district stretching into Mainpuri. The Sultans had to continually march into the region to suppress local uprisings for autonomy, such as Firuz Shah Tughlaq in 1377 suppressing a rebellion by Sumer Rai, a prominent Zamindar in this district. In 1392, three Zamindars: Rai Nar Singh, Bri Bahan and Sumer Shah, led an uprising against the Sultan Nasiruddin Muhammad Shah, until everyone but Sumer Shah was murdered under the pretense of a peace deal. The Sultan then sent Malik Sarwar, a eunuch, to restore order. He was given the territory between Kannauj and Bihar for his own, marking the foundation of the Jaunpur Sultanate.

For the next century, the region lay in the contested area between the spheres of influence of Delhi and Jaunpur, and was a major battleground, while also witnessing numerous rebellions from the local Rajput chiefs and nearby feudal lords. Control from the centre was very weak up until the First Battle of Panipat when the Delhi Sultanate finally fell to the Mughals. At the time the region was under the control of nobleman Qutub Khan, who surrendered after the Mughal armies came into the Doab after the Battle of Khanwa. From 1540 to 1556, the region fell under Suri rule again, until the Second Battle of Panipat put it under Mughal rule again. During Akbar's time, the district was divided between several mahals of the Sarkar of Agra: Haveli Jakhan, Sataura, Indawa, Bankipur. Part of the Etawah tehsil was part of Sakatpur mahal in the Sarkar of Kannauj. Etawah was mentioned when Prince Salim rebelled against Akbar and reached the city with 30,000 horse and foot. Afterwards, the region remained relatively undisturbed and not discussed until after the death of Aurangzeb.

=== Modern period ===
In 1714, Mughal emperor Farrukhasiyar granted to Afghan noble Muhammad Khan Bangash the middle Doab as fiefdom. After his death in 1743, Qaim Khan, his son, was sent to a disastrous battle in Rohilkhand by Safdar Jung, Nawab of Awadh, and was killed. Safdar Jung then tried to seize the Bangash territory using his deputy Nawal Rai, who was installed as Maharaja Bahadur. However, Nawal Rai's policies led to an Afghan rebellion and his death in battle with Ahmad Khan Bangash. Hearing of Nawal Rai's death Safdar Jung, along with the Marathas and the Jats of Bharatpur, crushed Ahmad Khan's army in battle. As a reward most of the present district was handed to the Marathas. In 1757, during a conflict between the Mughals and Awadh, Ahmad Khan Bangash used Mughal armies to retake Etawah from the Marathas, bringing it back under Mughal authority. However after Shuja ud Daula threatened his capital, he abandoned retaking the region of Etawah allowing the Marathas to reoccupy it.

In 1761, after his victory at the Third Battle of Panipat, Ahmad Shah Abdali gave the middle doab to Inayat Khan, son of Hafiz Rahmat Khan of Rohilkhand and his ally. Although they defeated the Marathas controlling the region and occupied Etawah Fort, the local Zamindars refused to pay tribute to Inayat Khan, forcing the Rohillas to subdue them. In 1770, after holding hostage Zabita Khan, son of Najib-ud-Daula, the Marathas compelled the Rohillas to surrender the fort of Etawah. In 1773, Shuja-ud-Daula of Awadh, along with the Rohillas, retook Etawah from the Marathas after a five day siege. Disputes between Awadh and the Rohillas over non-payment of debts led to Awadh crushing the Rohillas in 1774 with British help, after which Awadh annexed Etawah. While initially their officers resided in the Etawah fort, Shuja-ud-Daula soon had the fort demolished. Until 1801, the district was ruled by the officer Mian Almas Khan. In 1801, Sadaat Ali Khan surrendered this district and the rest of the lower Doab to the British.

Initially, the Etawah district was much larger than its current boundaries, encompassing much of present southwestern Uttar Pradesh. In 1804, parts of the district were transferred to Aligarh, and later more parts of the district were moved to Aligarh and Agra districts, while the Kuraoli tehsil was transferred to the district from Farrukhabad. In 1837, much of the northern part of the district was formed into a new Mainpuri district. In 1858, more parts of the district were given to Mainpuri. In 1957, part of Karhal tehsil in Mainpuri was transferred to Etawah. In 1997, Auraiya district was formed from the eastern two tehsils of the district.

== Administration ==
Etawah district is administered by an Indian Administrative Service (IAS) officer serving as the District Magistrate (DM), who is responsible for the overall administration, law and order, and implementation of government policies in the district.

For effective governance, the district is subdivided into six sub-divisions or tehsils, each managed by a Sub Divisional Magistrate (SDM). These tehsils serve as the primary revenue and administrative units, handling tasks such as maintenance of land records, revenue collection, and overseeing local governance.

Further, the tehsils are organized into eight development blocks, each headed by a Block Development Officer (BDO). The BDOs are tasked with planning, implementing, and monitoring development programs, rural infrastructure projects, and government welfare schemes at the grassroots level.

The tehsils and blocks collectively ensure that administrative functions, public services, and developmental activities reach the local population efficiently. This hierarchical structure facilitates coordinated governance, promotes accountability, and allows for effective execution of central and state government initiatives within the district.

The six tehsils of Etawah district are:

- Tehsil Sadar Etawah
- Bharthana
- Jaswant Nagar
- Saifai
- Chakar Nagar
- Takha

=== Blocks ===
The eight Blocks in Etawah are as follows:

- Barhpura
- Basrehar
- Jaswantnagar
- Mahewa
- Saifai
- Chakarnagar
- Takha
- Bharthana

== Demographics ==
Historical population
Year	Pop.	±% p.a.
1901	443,489	—
1911	417,882	−0.59%
1921	403,197	−0.36%
1931	410,018	+0.17%
1941	485,410	+1.70%
1951	533,569	+0.95%
1961	642,294	+1.87%
1971	782,666	+2.00%
1981	939,030	+1.84%
1991	1,130,340	+1.87%
2001	1,338,871	+1.71%
2011	1,581,810	+1.68%

Religions in Etawah district (2011)
Religion	Percent
Hinduism	92.17%
Islam	7.20%
Other or not stated	0.63%
Distribution of religions

According to the 2011 census Etawah district has a population of 1,581,810. This gives it a ranking of 316th in India (out of a total of 640). The district has a population density of 157 inhabitants per square kilometre (410/sq mi). Its population growth rate over the decade 2001-2011 was 12.91%. Etawah has a sex ratio of 970 females for every 1000 males, and a literacy rate of 70.14%. 23.16% of the population lives in urban areas. Scheduled Castes make up 24.55% of the population.

Hindus predominate in rural areas (nearly 97%). The vast majority of Muslims are urban and make up 20% of urban population in the district.

Languages of Etawah district (2011)
1. Hindi (98.2%)
2. Urdu (1.75%)
3. Others (0.07%)

At the time of the 2011 Census of India, 98.18% of the population in the district spoke Hindi (or a related language) and 1.75% Urdu as their first language.

== Nagar Panchayat ==
- Bakewar
- Ekdil
- Lakhna

== Villages ==
- Aheripur
- Bijauli
- Saifai

== Temples ==
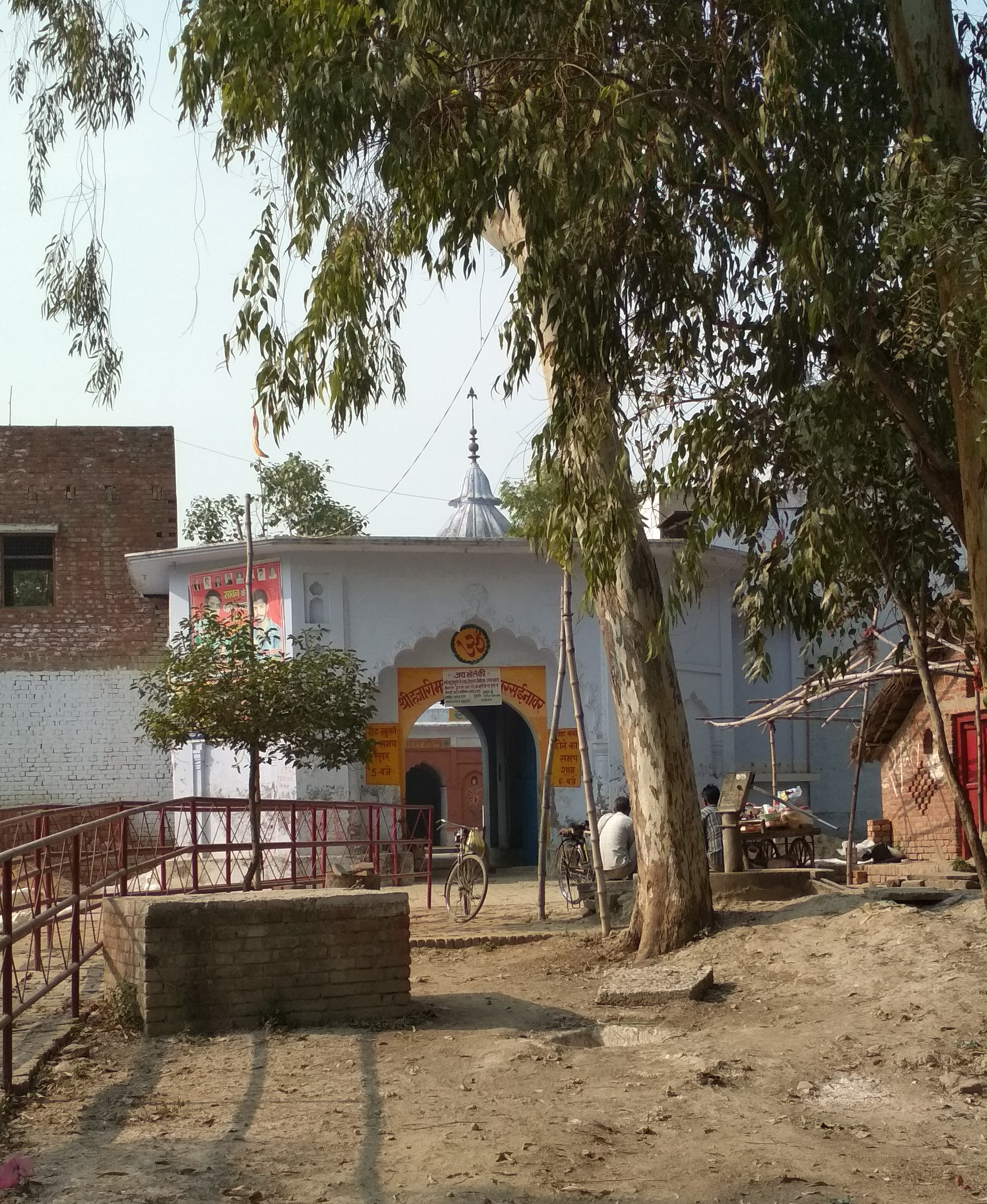
Hajari Mahadev Temple

- Hajari Mahadev Temple at Sarsai Nawar
- Kedareshwar Mandir at Etawah
- Kundeshwar Mahadev Mandir at Kundeshwar Agra Road Etawah

== Tourism ==
- Sarsai Nawar Wetland is a bird sanctuary and a protected area.
- Etawah Safari Park
- National Chambal Sanctuary

== Infrastructure ==
=== Regional Transport Office ===
- UP-75 Etawah RTO

=== Railways ===
- Etawah Junction railway station
- Saifai railway station
- Jaswantnagar railway station

=== Road and Highway Network ===
Etawah district has a well-developed road transportation network comprising national highways, expressways, and state highways. These roads connect the district with major cities of Uttar Pradesh and neighbouring states, supporting trade, commuting, and regional development.

The district lies on an important east–west transport corridor of northern India and is directly connected to Delhi, Kanpur, Agra, Lucknow, and Prayagraj.

==== National Highways ====
The following national highways pass through or serve Etawah district:

Highway No.	Name / Former Name	Major towns covered in Etawah district	Direction / Connectivity
NH-19	Grand Trunk Road (formerly NH-2)	Etawah, Jaswantnagar	Delhi – Agra – Kanpur – Prayagraj – Kolkata
NH-91A	—	Etawah	Etawah – Kannauj
NH-719		Bhind	Etawah – Gwalior

==== Expressways ====
Etawah district is one of the key districts connected by high-speed expressways in Uttar Pradesh:

Expressway	Entry / Coverage in district	Connectivity	Status
Agra–Lucknow Expressway	Passes through central Etawah district	Agra – Etawah – Kannauj – Lucknow	Operational
Bundelkhand Expressway	Originates near Etawah district	Etawah – Jhansi – Chitrakoot	Operational
Atal Progress-Way	Originates near Etawah district	Etawah(Uttar Pradesh) – Bhind(Madhya Pradesh) – Kota(Rajasthan)	Operational

==== State Highways ====
Several state highways provide regional and intra-district connectivity within Etawah district:

State Highway	Major towns / areas covered	Connectivity
SH-83	Etawah – Bharthana	Connects Etawah with Auraiya district
SH-92	Etawah – Chakarnagar	Connects rural and ravine areas
SH-126	Jaswantnagar region	Local inter-district connectivity

== Education ==
=== Universities ===
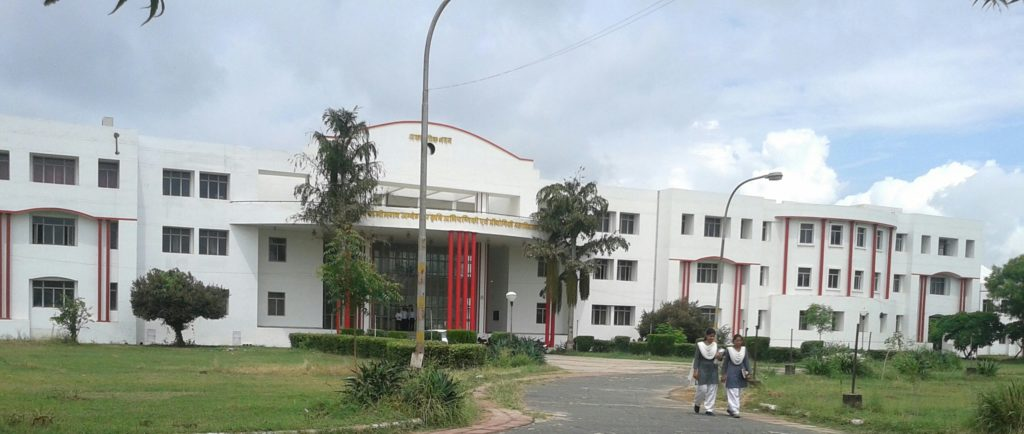
Faculty of Agricultural Engineering and Technology (in Etawah) of C.S.A. University of Agriculture & Technology

- Faculties of Agricultural Engineering and Technology, Dairy Technology and Fisheries Science of Chandra Shekhar Azad University of Agriculture and Technology named Baba Saheb Dr. B.R.A. College of Agriculture Engineering & Technology, College of Dairy Technology and College of Fisheries Science and Research Centre, established during 1994–95, 2015–16 and 2015–16 respectively.
- Uttar Pradesh University of Medical Sciences (formerly U.P. Rural Institute of Medical Sciences and Research) Saifai, Etawah is a medical research public university, established by Government of Uttar Pradesh under Act 15 of 2016. The university is running full-fledged Medical College, Paramedical College, Nursing College, Pharmacy College, Multi Specialty 850 bedded hospital, 150 bedded trauma and burn centre and 500 bedded super specialty hospital established in the university by Government of Uttar Pradesh.

=== Schools and colleges ===
- Chaudhary Charan Singh Post Graduate College, Heonra-Saifai, Etawah or Chaudhary Charan Singh Degree College is a college offering under-graduate and post-graduate courses in Science, Arts, Law, Commerce, Computer, Management, Education and Physical Education faculties. The college is situated in Heonra village which is part of Saifai Block (Vikas Khand) and neighbour village of Saifai village. The college is affiliated to Chhatrapati Shahu Ji Maharaj University (formerly Kanpur University).
- Government Girls Post Graduate College, Etawah is government women's college offering BA, BCom and MA courses in Etawah.
- Janta College Bakewar, Etawah is a college offering courses in Mathematics, Computer Science, Industrial chemistry, Biotechnology, Commerce and Agriculture. The college is affiliated to Chhatrapati Shahu Ji Maharaj University (formerly Kanpur University). It is considered as a top notch institution for science. It is accredited 'B' grade from NAAC.
- Karm Kshetra Post Graduate College or K.K. P.G. College, Etawah is a college offering under-graduate and post-graduate courses in Science, Arts, Commerce faculties. The college is affiliated to Chhatrapati Shahu Ji Maharaj University (formerly Kanpur University).
- Major Dhyan Chand Sports College, Saifai (Etawah) is a residential sports college in Saifai, established in 2014. It offers teaching from 6th to 12th standard and by the curriculum of Board of High School and Intermediate Education, Uttar Pradesh (U.P. Board) and sports training in cricket, football, hockey, wrestling, athletics, badminton, swimming and kabaddi.
- Pharmacy College Saifai, established in 2015, only government aided pharmacy college run by UP Government. Earlier affiliated with UPTU, now part of Uttar Pradesh University of Medical Sciences.
- S.S. Memorial Educational Academy, Saifai, Etawah is a private B.T.C. training college. It offers 2 year B.T.C. which is also known as Diploma in Elementary Education (D.El.Ed.) outside Uttar Pradesh.
- S.S. Memorial Senior Secondary Public School, Saifai, Etawah is a co-ed institute with English as the medium of instruction. The school is affiliated to CBSE, New Delhi and NCERT published books are introduced form class VI and onwards.

== Notable people ==
- George Adamson, wildlife conservationist
- K. Asif, film director was born in Etawah
- Sarita Bhadauria (b 1963) - politician and member of 17th Legislative Assembly of Uttar Pradesh
- Pia Bajpiee (b 1993) - Indian actress and model
- Babu Gulabrai, a significant figure in modern Hindi literature was born in Etawah
- Allan Octavian Hume, the founder of Indian National Congress was district collector in 1857
- Dr. Zakir Hussain, President of India completed his high schooling in Etawah
- C. K. Jain, former Secretary-General was born in Etawah
- Imdad Khan, Sitar and Surbahar player, founder of Etawah Gharana, lived in Etawah
- Mohsin-ul-Mulk, prominent in Aligarh Movement
- Kaptan Singh, born in Etawah
- Akhilesh Yadav (b 1973) - politician and member of 17th Lok Sabha
- Akshay Yadav, former MP born in Etawah
- Dimple Yadav (born 1978) - Indian politician and member of 18th Legislative Assembly of Uttar Pradesh
- Mulayam Singh Yadav (1939-2022) - politician and founder of the Samajwadi Party
- Ram Gopal Yadav (born 1946) - Indian politician
- Shivpal Singh Yadav (born 1955) - Indian politician
- Dr. Himanshu Yadav (born 1993) - A significant figure in geo-environmental engineering
