= Tej Pratap Singh Yadav =

Indian politician

Member of Uttar Pradesh Legislative Assembly
- Incumbent
- Assumed office 23 November 2024
- Preceded by: Akhilesh Yadav
- Constituency: Karhal

Member of Parliament, Lok Sabha
- In office 13 September 2014 – 23 May 2019
- Preceded by: Mulayam Singh Yadav
- Succeeded by: Mulayam Singh Yadav
- Constituency: Mainpuri, Uttar Pradesh

Personal details
- Born: 21 November 1987 (age 38) Saifai, Uttar Pradesh, India
- Party: Samajwadi Party
- Spouse: Raj Lakshmi Yadav (m. 2015)
- Relations: See: § The Yadav Family § Lalu Yadav family
- Education: Amity University, Noida; Leeds University
- Profession: Politician

Tej Pratap Singh Yadav (born 21 November 1987) is an Indian politician and MLA representing the Karhal and former Member of Parliament in the Indian Lok Sabha, where he represented the Mainpuri, Uttar Pradesh, from 2014 to 2019 as a member of the Samajwadi Party.

== Early life and education ==
Tej Pratap Singh Yadav was born on 21 November 1987 in Saifai village of Etawah district to Ranvir Singh Yadav and Mridula Yadav.

He studied at the Colonel Brown Cambridge School, Dehradun, and the Delhi Public School, Noida. He graduated with an MBA from the Leeds University Business School.

=== Family ===
His grandfather Ratan Singh Yadav, was the younger brother of Mulayam Singh Yadav.

Hariom Yadav, the former MLA of Sirsaganj and Shikohabad is his maternal granduncle.

== Career ==
He successfully contested a by-election to replace his granduncle, Mulayam Singh Yadav, as the Member of Parliament of the Mainpuri. He successfully contested a by-election to replace his uncle, Akhilesh Yadav, as the MLA of the Karhal.

He is part of management committee of two colleges named Chaudhary Charan Singh Post Graduate College and Chaudhary Charan Singh College of Law, both colleges established by Mulayam Singh Yadav.

== Positions held ==
| # | From | To | Positions | Party |
|---|---|---|---|---|
| 1. | 2014 | 2019 | MP in 16th Lok Sabha from Mainpuri (by-election) | SP |
| 2. | 2024 | | MLA from Karhal (by-election) | SP |

== Personal life ==
In 2015, Tej Pratap married Raj Lakshmi Yadav, the youngest daughter of Lalu Prasad Yadav and Rabri Devi. The couple had a child in 2016.
