= Saifai International Cricket Stadium =

Cricket ground in Saifai, India

- Interactive map of Saifai International Cricket Stadium

Ground information
- Location: Major Dhyanchand Sports College campus, Saifai (Etawah district), Uttar Pradesh, India
- Country: India
- Coordinates: 26.9667°N 78.9574°E
- Capacity: 43,000
- Owner: Major Dhyanchand Sports College (Government of Uttar Pradesh)
- Operator: Major Dhyanchand Sports College & District Cricket Association Jalaun
- Tenants: District Cricket Association Jalaun; Uttar Pradesh cricket team Major Dhyanchand Sports College
- End names
- n/a n/a

International information

Team information
UPCA	(2018 – present)
- As of 6 April 2020; Source: Cricinfo

Saifai International Cricket Stadium is a cricket stadium of International Standard in Saifai (Etawah district), Uttar Pradesh, India. It is situated inside the Major Dhyanchand Sports College's campus. It has a seating capacity of 43,000 people and has one of the largest scoreboard displays for a cricket stadium in India. There is an All-weather Swimming Pool, Athletics Stadium and an Indoor Stadium in the campus of the Sports College along with this cricket stadium. It was inaugurated on 1 June 2018, along with the Etawah Safari Park and Abhinav Vidyalaya, Saifai at a function in Etawah city.

This stadium falls under jurisdiction of District Cricket Association Jalaun which is a district/zonal unit of Uttar Pradesh Cricket Association. Etawah district in which stadium is situated doesn't have a district cricket association approved by Uttar Pradesh Cricket Association and because of it, cricketers selection from Etawah district along with other cricket activities fall under District Cricket Association Jalaun.

== History ==
This stadium's building Work was started by the government, in 2017. It is built in the native village of then Uttar Pradesh's chief minister, Akhilesh Yadav, which he approved the building plan in August 2015 in his government's cabinate meeting. Its majority work was finished but The building work was halted due to monetary issues.

== In popular culture ==
Saifai International Cricket Stadium was featured in Galat Karam (Official Music Video) by Panther & RAGA which has more than 37 million views on YouTube.

== See also ==
- Green Park Stadium
- Ekana International Cricket Stadium
- Major Dhyanchand Sports College
- Master Chandgiram Sports Stadium
