= State Highway 83 (Uttar Pradesh) =

State highway in Uttar Pradesh

State Highway 83
- State Highway 83 Uttar Pradesh in red

Route information
- Length: 52.8 km (32.8 mi)

Location
- Country: India
- States: Uttar Pradesh: 52.8 km (32.8 mi)
- Primary destinations: NH 34 - Kurawali (Mainpuri district) - Mainpuri city - Agra Lucknow Expressway - Karhal town - Saifai village - NH 19 - Etawah city

Highway system
- Roads in India; Expressways; National; State; Asian

Uttar Pradesh State Highway 83 (UP SH 83) passes through NH 34 - Kurawali (Mainpuri district) - Mainpuri city - Agra Lucknow Expressway - Karhal town - Saifai village - NH 19 - Etawah city and covers a distance of 52.8 km.

Uttar Pradesh state in India has a series of road networks. There are 35 national highways with total length of 4635 km and 83 state highways with total length of 8,432 km (5,239 mi).

== See also ==
- State highway
- State Highway (India)
- Mainpuri district
- NH 34
- Mainpuri city
- Agra Lucknow Expressway
- Saifai village
- NH 19
- Etawah city
- Etawah district
- Etawah Safari Park
