= Political families of Bihar =

List of Indian political families based in Bihar

The list of political families of Bihar state of India:

== Lalu Yadav family ==
Lalu Prasad Yadav and Rabri Devi are married since 1973 and the couple have 9 children (2 sons and 7 daughters)

- Lalu Prasad Yadav, former Chief Minister of Bihar (1990-1997) and former Union Railways Minister of India (2004-2009)
- Rabri Devi, former Chief Minister of Bihar and current MLC of Bihar Legislative Council (wife of Lalu)
  - Tej Pratap Yadav Former Cabinet Minister of Health in Government of Bihar (elder son of Lalu)
  - Tejashwi Yadav, former IPL cricketer and former Deputy Chief Minister of Bihar (younger son of Lalu)
  - Misa Bharti, MP of Patliputra (eldest daughter of Lalu)
  - Rohini Acharya Yadav, contested in 2024 Indian General election from Saran but lost to Rajiv Pratap Rudy of BJP(2nd daughter of Lalu)
  - Chanda Yadav, (3rd daughter of Lalu)
  - Ragini Yadav, (4th daughter of Lalu) - married to Rahul Yadav, Samajwadi Party leader, Rahul lost Sikandrabad assembly seat in 2017 and 2022.
  - Hema Yadav, (5th daughter of Lalu)
  - Anushka Yadav (6th daughter of Lalu) - married to Chiranjeev Rao, Former MLA of Rewari
  - Raj Lakshmi Yadav (youngest daughter of Lalu) - married to Tej Pratap Singh Yadav, former MP of Mainpuri (2014–19).
- Sadhu Yadav, former MP of Gopalganj (2004–09) (brother of Rabri Devi)
- Subhash Prasad Yadav, former MP of Rajya Sabha (2004–10) (brother of Rabri Devi)

== Mishra family ==
- Lalit Narayan Mishra (LN Mishra) - Former Railway Minister of India
  - Vijay Kumar Mishra - Former member of the Bihar Legislative Council, former Member of Parliament, three terms MLA and active politician of Bihar Janta Dal (United) (eldest son of LN Mishra)
    - Rishi Mishra - Former MLA in Bihar Legislative Assembly (son of Vijay Mishra)
  - Gauri Shankar Rajhans - Former MP married to Hema (niece of LN Mishra)
- Jagannath Mishra - Former Chief Minister of Bihar and Union Cabinet Minister of India (brother of LN Mishra)
- Mritunjay Mishra - Leader of Bharatiya Janata Party (brother of LN Mishra)
- Nitish Mishra - Cabinet Minister of Rural Development Department in Government of Bihar and currently Member of the Bihar Legislative Assembly (youngest son of Jagannath Mishra)

== Thakur Yugal Kishore Sinha family ==
- Sadhu Sharan Singh - Nationalist, congressman and father of Thakur Jugal Kishore Sinha
  - Thakur Jugal Kishore Sinha - Freedom fighter, Member of the first Lok Sabha and known as the father of Cooperative Movement in India.
  - Ram Dulari Sinha - Wife of Thakur Jugal Kishore Sinha, freedom fighter, Member of the first Vidhan Sabha, Union Minister and Governor, first woman from Bihar to attain a master's degree.
    - Madhurendra Kumar Singh - Member All India Congress Committee, former Director Central Warehousing Corporation and Bihar State Cooperative Bank.
      - Mrigendra Kumar Singh - son of Dr. Madhurendra Kumar Singh. State Secretary of Bihar Pradesh Congress Committee, former President of Sheohar Loksabha Youth Congress.

== Jagdeo Prasad family ==
- Jagdeo Prasad - freedom fighter, founder of Shoshit Samaj Dal and former Deputy Chief Minister of Bihar
  - Nagmani Kushwaha - former Union Minister of India (1999-2004) (son of Jagdeo Prasad)
  - Suchitra Sinha - former Cabinet Minister in Government of Bihar (daughter-in-law of Jagdeo Prasad)
- Satish Prasad Singh - former Chief Minister of Bihar (Jan 1968 to Feb 1968) (father of Suchitra Sinha)

== Verma family ==
- Upendra Nath Verma, former minister in Government of India, in the cabinet of VP Singh.
  - Bagi Kumar Verma, Former MLA from Kurtha, former minister in Government of Bihar. (son of UN Verma)
  - Kumud Verma, former MLC in Bihar Legislative Council (daughter in law of UN Verma & wife of Abhijat)

== Chaudhary family ==
- Shakuni Choudhury - seven times MLA, former MP from Bihar and Cabinet Minister in Government of Bihar.
  - Samrat Chaudhary - 25th Chief Minister of Bihar, 1st Bihar CM from BJP, MLA from Tarapur (Since 2025). (son of Shakuni)

== Mahto family ==
- Rambalak Mahto - Longest serving Advocate General of Bihar, legal advisor to both the Nitish Kumar and Lalu Prasad Yadav.
  - Birendra Mahto - MLA of Teghra (2015-2020) (son of Rambalak Mahto)

== Paswan family ==
- Ram Vilas Paswan - Former Union Minister of Railways, Consumer Affairs, Food and Public Distribution Departments.
  - Chirag Paswan - Union minister of Food and Sports, Bollywood actor and MP from Hajipur. (son of Ram Vilas).
- Ram Chandra Paswan - Former MP from Samastipur (brother of Ram Vilas)
  - Prince Raj, former MP from Samastipur (son of Ram Chandra Paswan)
- Pashupati Kumar Paras - Former Union Cabinet Minister of Food and Public Distribution Department in the Ministry of Narendra Modi. Former MP from Hajipur. Former member of the Bihar Legislative Council (MLC) and Bihar Legislative Assembly (MLA) (brother of Ram Vilas)

== Jagjivan Ram family ==
- Jagjivan Ram - Independence Activist and Deputy Prime Minister of India. Former MP from Sasaram
  - Meira Kumar - Daughter of Babu Jagjivan Ram and first woman Speaker of Lok Sabha.
    - Anshul Avijit, son of Meira Kumar.
- Sumitra Devi, former MLA of Arrah (mother-in-law of Meira Kumar)

== Pappu Yadav family ==
- Pappu Yadav - former MP of Madhepura (2014-2019).
- Ranjeet Ranjan - former MP of Supaul (2014-2019) and present MP in Rajya Sabha.

== Anand Mohan family ==
- Anand Mohan Singh - former Lok Sabha MP of Sheohar and former MLA of Mahishi.
- Lovely Anand - Lok Sabha MP from Sheohar.
  - Chetan Anand Singh - MLA of Nabinagar

== Singh family ==
- Harihar Singh, popularly known as Bihar Ji, Bhojpuri poet and former CM of Bihar.
  - Amrendra Pratap Singh, MLA from Arrah and former Minister in Government of Bihar (son of Harihar)
  - Mrigendra Pratap Singh, former Speaker & Finance Minister in Government of Jharkhand. (son of Harihar)

== AN Sinha family ==
- Dr. Anugrah Narayan Sinha - Statesman, freedom fighter and first Deputy Chief Minister of Bihar from year 1946–1957.
  - Satyendra Narayan Sinha - freedom fighter, Member of Provisional Parliament from year 1950-1952, Chief Minister of Bihar and leader of JP movement, son of Anugrah Narayan Sinha.
  - Kishori Sinha - Former Member of Parliament, wife of Satyendra Narayan Sinha
    - Nikhil Kumar - Governor of Kerala, son of Satyendra Narayan Sinha
    - Shyama Singh - Member of Parliament, wife of Nikhil Kumar
  - Rameshwar Prasad Sinha - father of Kishori Sinha, Member Constituent Assembly of India (1947–1950), MLA, Bihar (1937-1939)
    - N. K. Singh - Rajya Sabha MP, brother-in-law of Nikhil Kumar
    - Uday Singh - Member of Parliament, Nikhil Kumar's younger brother-in-law
    - Madhuri Singh - former MP, Nikhil Kumar's mother-in-law

== Chandrashekhar family ==
- Chandrashekhar Singh - former Chief Minister of Bihar (1983-1985) and former Union Minister in Government of India.
- Manorama Singh - former MP from Banka (1984–85 and 1986–89) (wife of Chandra shekhar).

== Rama Devi family ==
- Rama Devi - MP of Sheohar (2009–2024) and MP of Motihari (1998–99).
- Braj Bihari Prasad - former Minister of Science and Technology in Government of Bihar (husband of Rama Devi)
  - Ranjana Raveesh, (daughter of Rama devi)
  - Raveesh Kumar, IFS officer, current Ambassador of India to the Czech Republic and former Spokesperson for the Ministry of External Affairs. (son-in-law of Rama Devi)

== Azad Family ==
- Bhagwat Jha Azad, former Chief Minister of Bihar (1988–89).
  - Kirti Azad, Lok Sabha MP from Darbhanga (1999-2004 and 2009-2019).
  - Yashovardhan Azad, former IPS officer (son of Bhagwat Azad)
