= Major Dhyanchand Sports College =

College in Saifai, Uttar Pradesh, India

Major Dhyanchand Sports College, Saifai
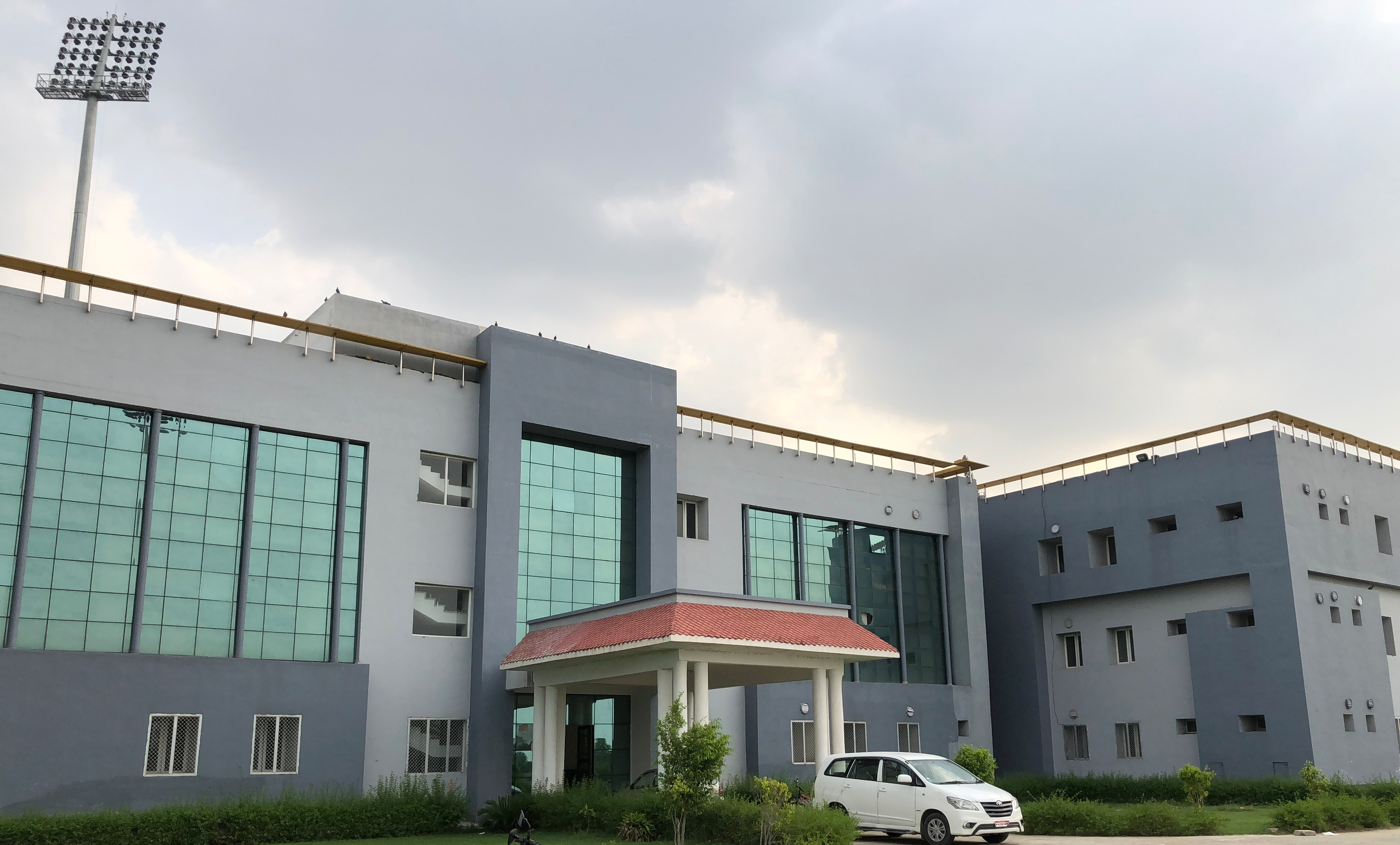
- Former names: Saifai Sports College, Saifai (2014-2017)
- Type: Sports College
- Established: 2014; 12 years ago
- Affiliations: Uttar Pradesh Sports Colleges Society
- Academic affiliations: U.P. Board
- Principal: Sarvendra Singh Chauhan
- Location: Saifai, Etawah district, Uttar Pradesh, 206130, India; 26.9648°N 78.9603°E
- Campus: Saifai
- Website: upsports.gov.in/pages/en/enmenu/affiliated-colleges/en-saifai-sports-college-etawah
- Location within Uttar Pradesh

Major Dhyanchand Sports College, Saifai, earlier known as Saifai Sports College is a college and sports academy in Saifai, Etawah district of Uttar Pradesh. It was established in 2014 in Saifai, Etawah district, Uttar Pradesh as Saifai Sports College by state government. It offers sports training in athletics, cricket, football, hockey, wrestling, kabaddi, swimming, badminton and judo in sixth to twelfth standard with the curriculum of U.P. Board. It is the third sports college established in Uttar Pradesh after Guru Gobind Singh Sports College of Lucknow and Beer Bahadur Singh Sports College in Gorakhpur. Major Dhyanchand Sports College is 2024 Sub–Junior runner-up of Subroto Cup International Football Tournament.

== Sports training ==
College provides training of the following sports:

=== Boy students ===
Athletics, cricket, football, hockey, wrestling, kabaddi, swimming and badminton

=== Girl students (no new admissions) ===
Badminton, judo and athletics

== Campus ==
It is a residential campus and due to it overall weight is borne by the government of Uttar Pradesh. The boy square of college gets sports training in cricket, football, hockey, wrestling, athletics, badminton, swimming and kabaddi as well as they get teaching from sixth to twelfth standard by the curriculum of Board of High School and Intermediate Education, Uttar Pradesh. In this Sports College, number of trainees is determine as 560. In the first year 74 trainees started studying here.

Along with college campus, it also manages and uses sports facilities of nearby Master Chandgiram Sports Stadium.

== Facilities ==
=== Sports facilities ===
- Saifai International Cricket Stadium (in campus)
- Synthetic running track or athletes stadium (in campus)
- Indoor Stadium (in campus)
- Swimming pools (an International All-weather Swimming pool in campus and an old one at Master Chandgiram Sports Stadium)
- Hockey field astroturf (at Master Chandgiram Sports Stadium)
- Three grass fields (in campus)
- Basketball courts (in campus)
- Tennis court (in campus)

=== Other facilities/buildings ===
- Admin & education block
- Hostel
- Dispensary
- Guest house
- Faculty accommodation
- Electrical substation

== Notable people ==
=== Notable alumni ===
- Ram Baboo, 2022 Asian Games Bronze medalist (6 months training course)
- Amir Ali, India men's national field hockey team
- Dipesh Chauhan, Goalkeeper, NorthEast United FC
- Gopi Sonkar, India men's national field hockey team (Saifai Sports Hostel)
- Manish Chaudhary, Defender, Namdhari FC - I-League

=== Notable faculty ===
- Mohinder Pal Singh, 1986 Asian Games Bronze medalist as a member of India men's national field hockey team
