= Master Chandgiram Sports Stadium =

Sports complex in Saifai, Etawah, India

Master Chandgi Ram Sports Stadium
- Interactive map of Master Chandgi Ram Sports Stadium
- Location: Saifai, Etawah, Uttar Pradesh
- Coordinates: 26.956387°N 78.957244°E
- Owner: Major Dhyanchand Sports College, Saifai (Government of Uttar Pradesh)
- Operator: Major Dhyanchand Sports College, Saifai
- Capacity: 20,000
- Type: Sports complex

Tenants
- Major Dhyanchand Sports College, Saifai; Uttar Pradesh Wizards

The Master Chandgi Ram Sports Stadium, Saifai is an national-level sports complex having a hockey pitch, multipurpose hall (badminton & wrestling facilities), a swimming pool and Sports Authority of India (SAI) Training Centre in Saifai, Etawah District of Uttar Pradesh. It is named after Haryanvi wrestler Chandgi Ram. Stadium is now under the administration of Major Dhyanchand Sports College, Saifai which is situated one kilometre away from stadium.

== Sports Facilities ==
=== Astroturf Hockey field ===
The stadium has facilities like a 20,000-capacity Astroturf hockey field with synthetic running track, base & synthetic surface. It witnesses 5th Senior National Hockey Championship 2015(Women).

It is a Global Certified Field from FIH (International Hockey Federation).

=== Swimming Pool ===
It is a swimming pool which fulfills international standards of swimming.

=== Multipurpose Hall ===
This sports complex had a multipurpose hall too. It is used for badminton and wrestling practice.

=== Sports Authority of India (SAI) Training Centre ===
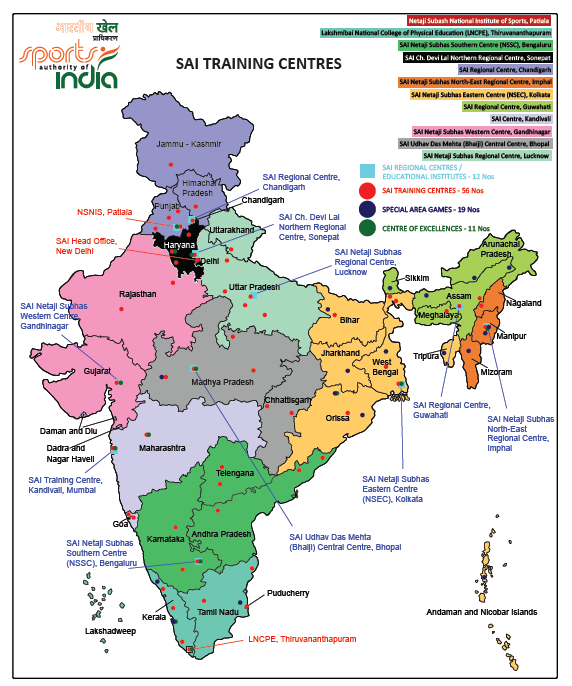
SAI Training Centres across India

Master Chandgi Ram Sports Stadium also has a sports training centre of Sports Authority of India in its campus. It offers residential training in Athletics, Field hockey, Handball and Wrestling and non-residential training in Shooting.

== Notable athletes ==
Stadium is used by Sports Authority of India, Major Dhyanchand Sports College, Saifai (Hockey and Swimming only) and Uttar Pradesh Government's Saifai Sports Hostel. Some notable athletes who used to practice here are-

- Gopi Sonkar, India men's national field hockey team (Saifai Sports Hostel)
- Amir Ali, India men's national field hockey team (Major Dhyanchand Sports College, Saifai)

== Sports College ==
Saifai village has a residential sports college, established in 2014. It offers teaching from 6th to 12th standardand by the curriculum of Board of High School and Intermediate Education, Uttar Pradesh (U.P. Board) and sports training in cricket, football, hockey, wrestling, athletics, badminton, swimming and kabaddi. Although Major Dhyanchand Sports College has own campus and facilities but students of sports college use hockey, wrestling, badminton and swimming facilities of Master Chandgiram Sports Stadium too.

== See also ==
- Saifai International Cricket Stadium
- Amitabh Bachchan Sports Complex
