= Statue of Krishna, Saifai =

Statue of Krishna by Edward Breathitt

Statue of Krishna
- Interactive map of Statue of Krishna
- Location: Saifai, Etawah district, Uttar Pradesh, India
- Coordinates: 26.961587°N 78.9578407°E
- Designer: Edward Breathitt
- Type: Statue
- Material: Bronze
- Height: 51 feet (16 m)

The Statue of Krishna is a 51 foot 60 ton bronze and copper statue of the major Hindu deity Krishna in Saifai, Uttar Pradesh, India.

== Description ==
The statue depicts Krishna wielding a chariot wheel as a weapon during the Kurukshetra War from the Indian epic poem The Mahābhārata. The statue was funded by the Saifai Mahotsav committee. It was designed by New Delhi based artist Edward Breathitt.
