= Tiger and Lion Safari =

Safari park in Karnataka, India

Tyavarekoppa Tiger and Lion Reserve
- Interactive map of Tyavarekoppa Tiger and Lion Reserve
- 13.972°N 75.493°E
- Date opened: 1988
- Land area: 250 hectares (2.5 km^{2})
- Major exhibits: Lion, tiger, leopard, sloth bear, Indian jackal, deer, crocodile, Porcupine, Wild Boar, Golden Langur, Dhole, python, and birds.

Tiger and Lion Safari, Tyavarekoppa, Shimoga is located the state of Karnataka, India, with an area of 250 hectares (2.5 km^{2}), at a distance of about 10.0 km (6.2 miles) from Shivamogga city, and 275.0 km (170.9 miles) from Bangalore. Started in 1988, it is Karnataka's second safari park, after Bannerghatta National Park near Bangalore. Despite the name, the lion and tiger are neither the only animals here, nor are they the only big cats here.

== Fauna ==
=== Felidae ===
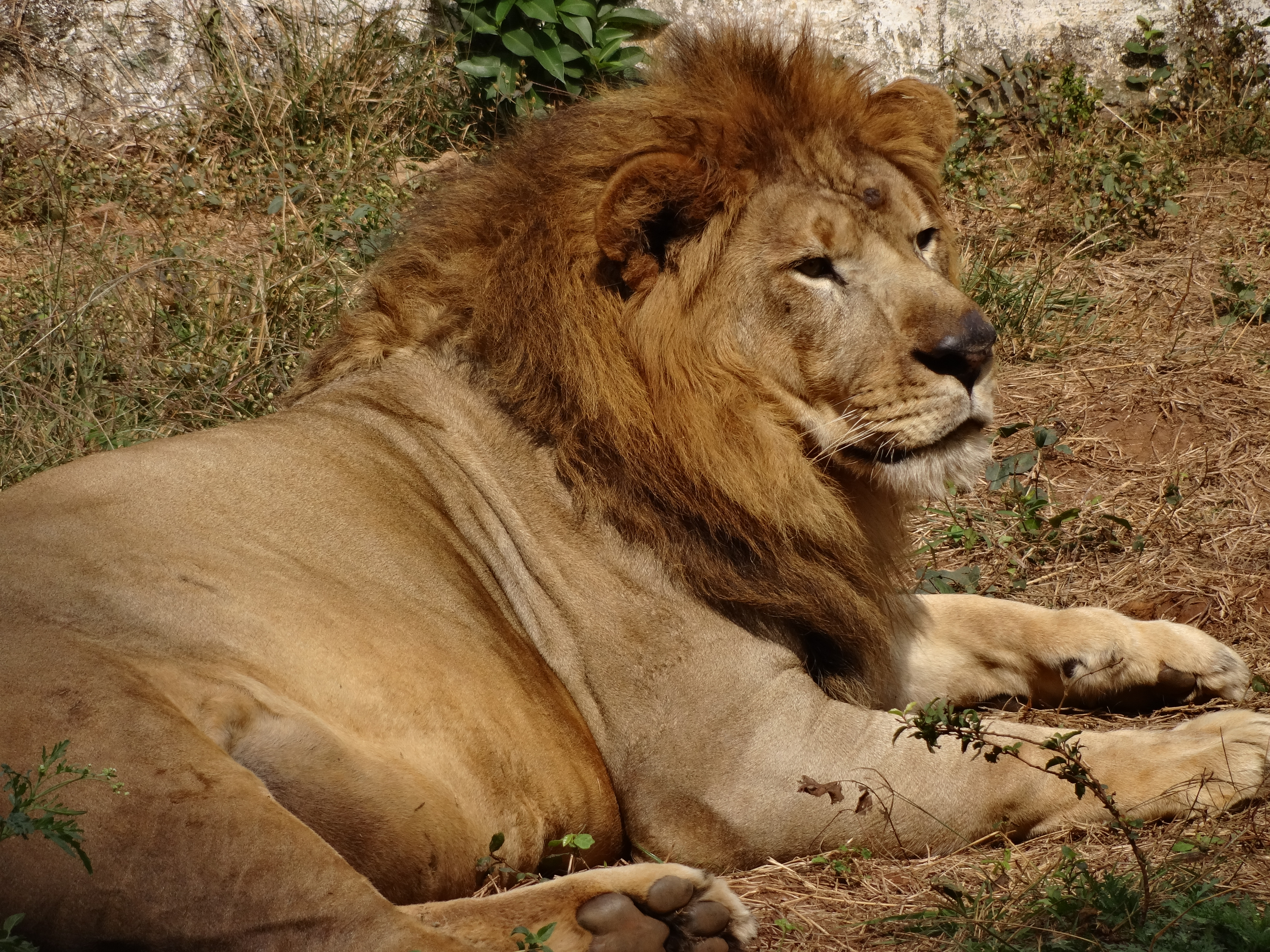
An Asiatic lion in Tyavarekoppa

Asiatic lions, Bengal tigers and Indian leopards are kept in separate enclosures and they are viewed by a guided "safari" vehicle. A relatively rare black panther was born here during 2012, and is available for public view as a caged animal.

In 2005, a tigress gave birth to cubs here. On 2 March 2006, four tigers killed a casual laborer who fell down while repairing iron gates. A tigress which strayed into nearby villages was captured and kept in this safari.

=== Birds ===
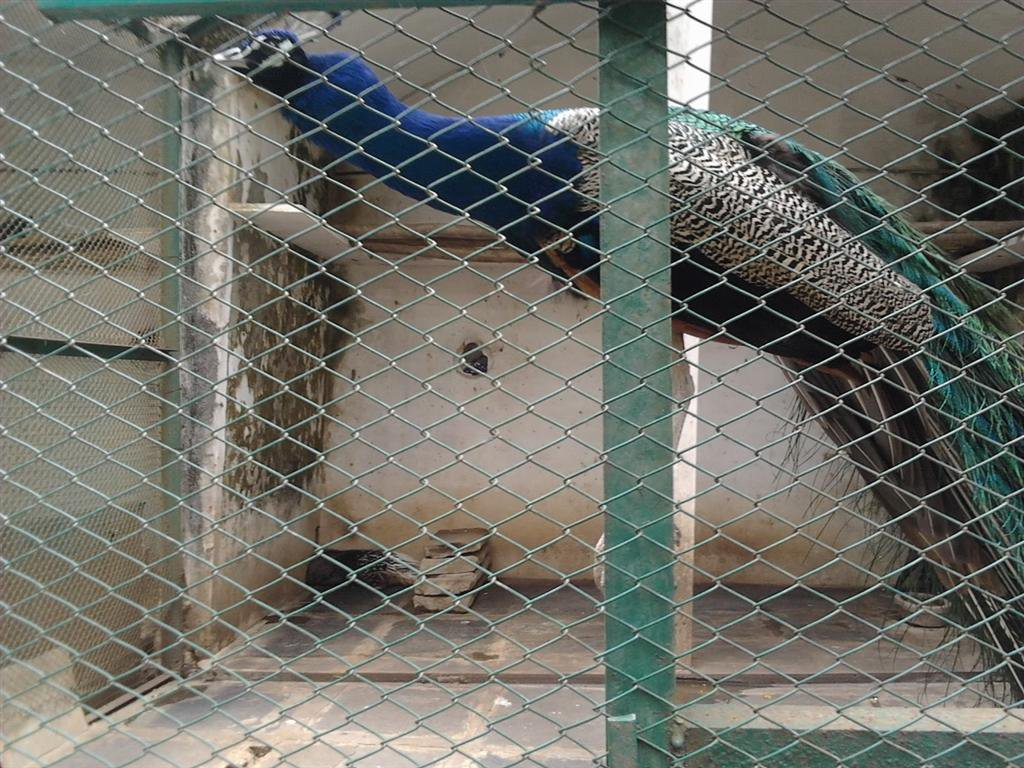
An Indian peafowl in Tyavarekoppa

More than 11 different species of birds were kept in cages for display. They include the white pheasant, silver pheasant, red junglefowl, and love bird.

== See also ==
- Etawah Safari Park
- Bangalore Division
- Bayalu Seeme
- Konkan
- Western Ghats
- Wildlife of India
