= Guru Gobind Singh Sports College =

Sports college in Lucknow, Uttar Pradesh

Guru Gobind Singh Sports College, Lucknow
- Motto: क्रीड़ायाम् राष्ट्रस्य बलम्
- Type: Sports college
- Established: 1975
- Affiliations: Uttar Pradesh Sports Colleges Society
- Academic affiliations: U.P. Board
- Principal: Ajay Kumar Sethi
- Students: 345
- Location: Lucknow, Uttar Pradesh, India; 26.9331°N 80.9785°E
- Campus: Lucknow
- Website: sportscollegelko.in

- Location in Uttar Pradesh

Guru Gobind Singh Sports College, Lucknow is a residential sports college in Lucknow, Uttar Pradesh. It offers sports training in football, hockey, wrestling, athletics, badminton, swimming and kabaddi in 6th to 12th standard and with the curriculum of U.P. Board. It is the first sports college established in Uttar Pradesh before Beer Bahadur Singh Sports College in Gorakhpur and Etawah's Saifai Sports College.

== Notable alumni ==
- Jagbir Singh, field hockey player
- Mohinder Pal Singh, field hockey player
- Danish Mujtaba, field hockey player
- Suresh Raina, cricketer
- R. P. Singh, cricketer
- Akash Mishra, football player
- Dinesh Patel, baseball pitcher
- Rinku Singh, baseball pitcher
- Indrajeet Patel, runner
- Narendra Hirwani, cricketer
- Mritunjay Tripathi, cricketer

== See also ==
- Beer Bahadur Singh Sports College
- Major Dhyanchand Sports College
- Maharana Pratap Sports College
- Motilal Nehru School of Sports
- Lucknow Christian College
