= Bannerghatta National Park =

National park in Karnataka, India

- IUCN category II (national park)
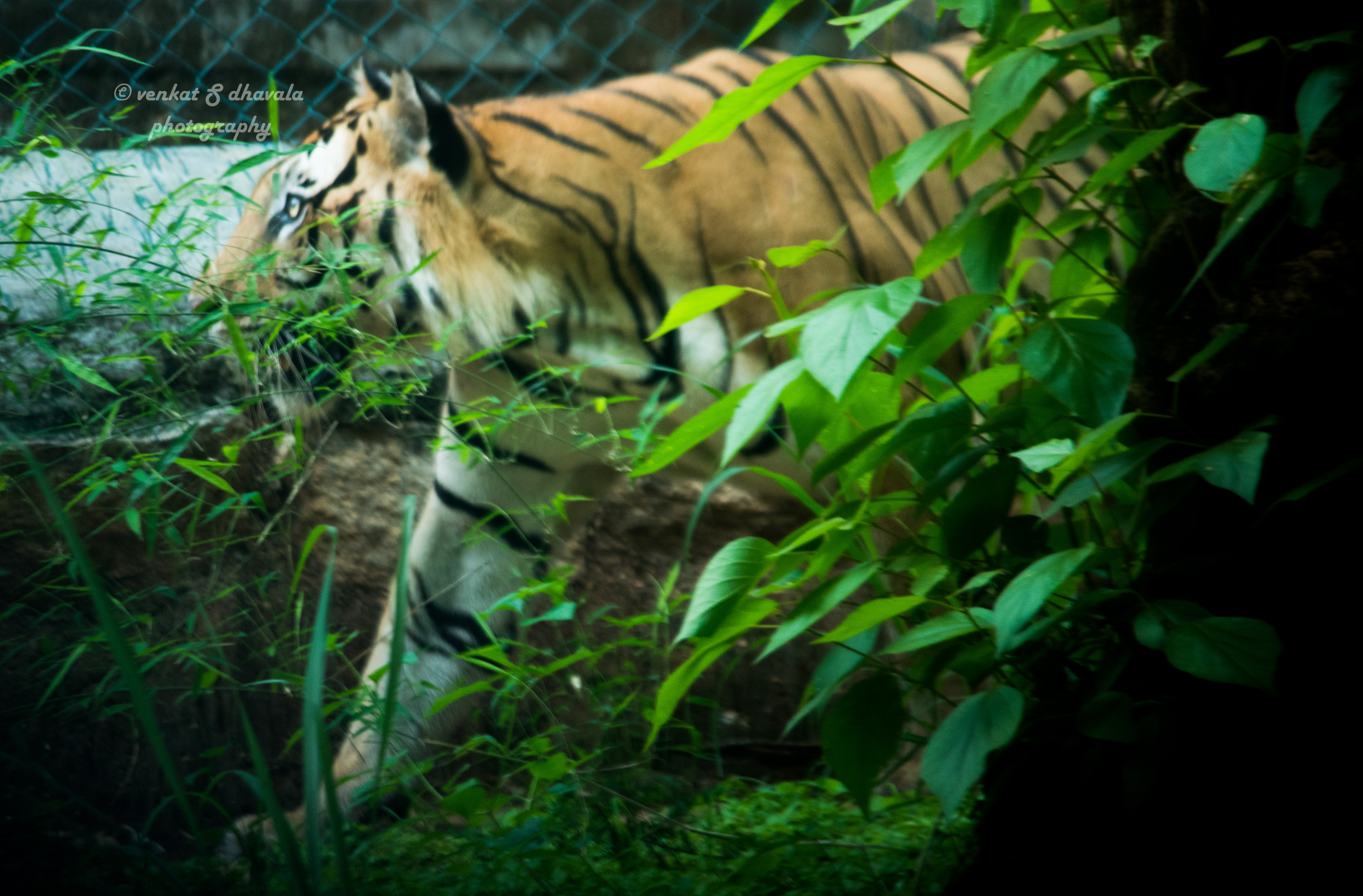
- Tiger at the Bannerghatta National Park

- Location within Karnataka
- Interactive map of Bannerghatta National Park
- Location: Karnataka, India
- Nearest city: Bangalore
- Coordinates: 12°48′03″N 77°34′32″E
- Area: 260.51 km^{2} (100.58 sq mi)
- Established: 1974
- Governing body: Ministry of Environment and Forests, Government of India
- Administrator: The Executive Director, Bannerghatta Biological Park
- Website: bannerghattabiologicalpark.org

Bannerghatta National Park is a national park in India, located In Bengaluru and Bengaluru South District, Karnataka. It was founded in 1970 and declared as a national park in 1974. In 2002, a small portion of the park became a zoological garden, the Bannerghatta Biological Park.

There are ancient temples in the park for worship and it is a destination for trekking and hiking. Within the national park area are six rural villages enclosed within three large enclosures for sheep and cattle farming. This park offers a wide range of diverse wildlife to the explorers. Coming from the finest of Bengaluru, Karnataka, this park offers a guided bus tour all along the 6 km safari roads, which is specially made for safaris and foreign tourist gatherers.

Between 1995 and 2021, the dry deciduous forests in the National Park shrank by approximately 44% due to uncontrolled diversion of forest land for agricultural purpose, urbanisation, etc.

== Geography ==
The 65,127.5 acre (260.51 km^{2}) national park is located about 22 km south of Bangalore in the hills of the Anekal range with an elevation of 1245 - 1634m. The park has a hilly terrain of granite sheets under moist deciduous forest valleys and scrubland on higher areas. Sixteen villages border the park. Most of the national park consists of artificial forest, and some animals have been introduced. The park is part of a wildlife corridor for elephants which connects the BR Hills and the Sathyamangalam forest. The park is contiguous with Talli reserve forest in the southeast and Bilikal forest in the south.

=== Water sources ===
The park's rainfall is 700 mm per year. The Suvarnamukhi stream runs through the national park. On 15 May 2014, four bore wells were opened to provide water in dry times.

=== Flora ===
Flora in the park include:

- Narcissus latifolia
- Schleichera oleosa
- Terminalia tomentosa
- Sandalwood
- Neem
- T. arjuna
- Grewia tilaefolia
- Santalum album
- Tamarind
- Bamboo
- Eucalyptus
- Bauhinia purpurea
- Samanea saman
- Peltophorum pterocarpum

=== Fauna ===
Notable fauna in the park include Asian elephants, gaur, Indian boar, Indian leopard, sloth bears, Indian jackal, Bengal fox, dhole, sambar deer, chital deer, Indian pangolins, Indian pythons, and king cobra.

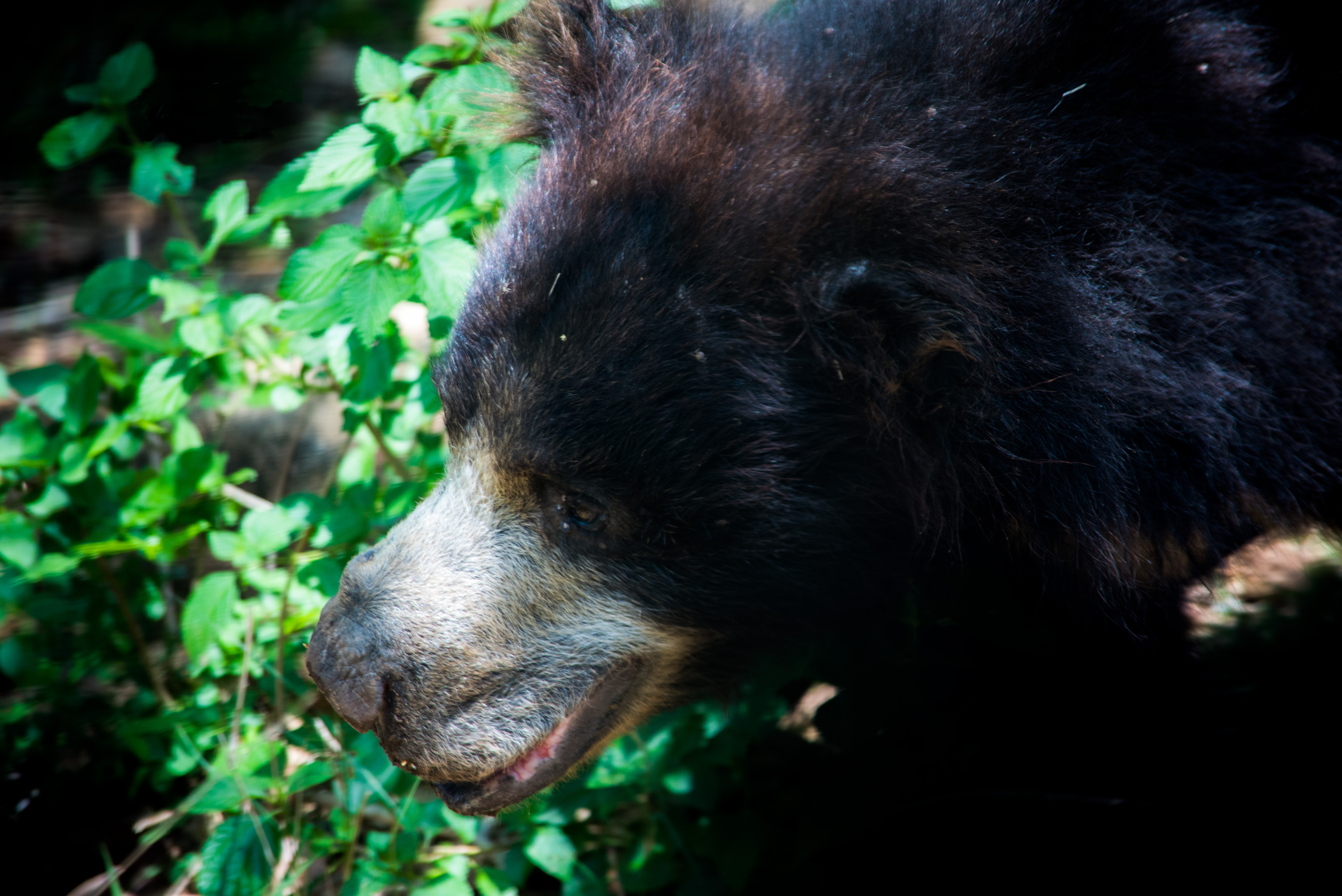
wild bear

One hundred and one species of birds have been recorded in the park. The fauna pose some risk to humans. In August 2012, a man was trampled to death by an elephant. Occasionally, animals leave the reserve, coming into contact with humans. For example, elephants have been sighted on the Bantamweight-Anekal road which passes close to the park. In 2007, a leopard and her cubs entered a local school.

== Illegal mining around Bannerghatta national park ==
The park is threatened by multiple granite quarries operating around the national park. These quarries are located alarmingly close to critical elephant corridors inside the national park such as Kardikal - Madeswara corridor. While there is ban on mining and granite quarrying around the national park within a radius of One km from the boundary demarcated as "Safe Zone", quarries operate unabatedly. Vehicular movement is also uncontrolled. Tremors from the explosives used in the quarry operations are felt across a radius of at least five km adversely affecting elephants and other wild animals.

== In popular culture ==
Bannerghatta, a 2021 Malayalam language movie released on Amazon Prime, is based on the Bannerghatta National Park.

== Gallery ==
Bannerghata National Park

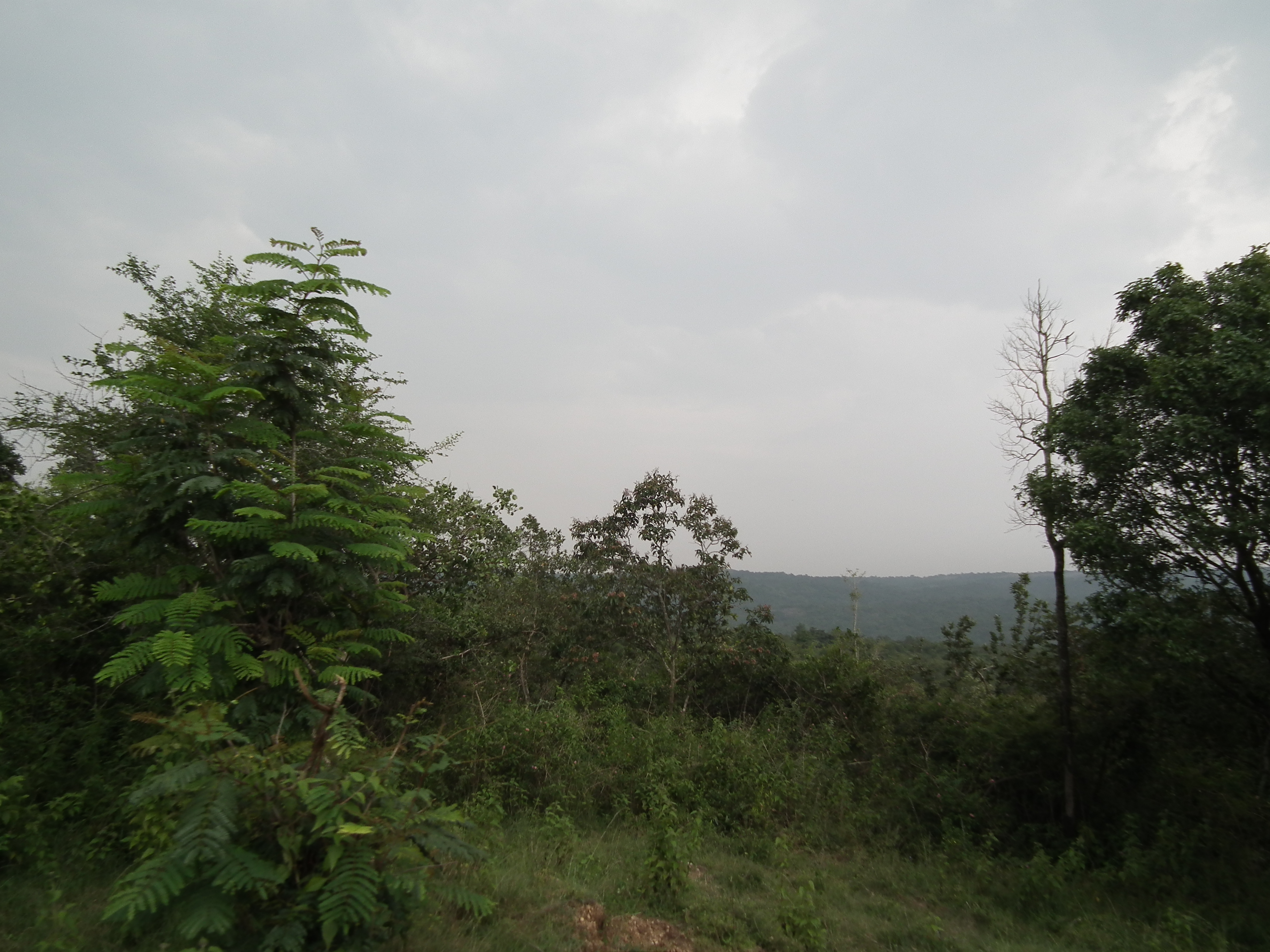

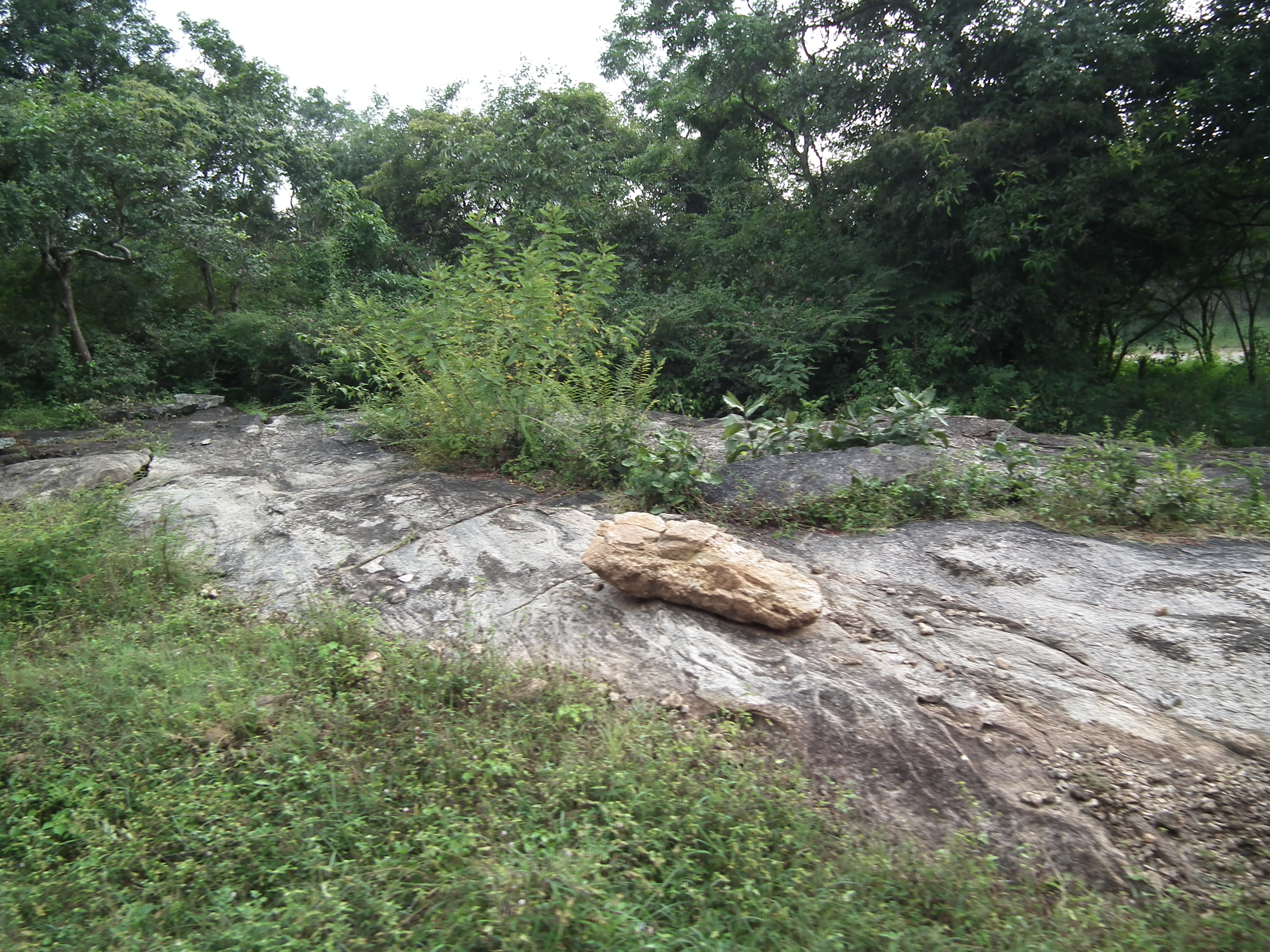

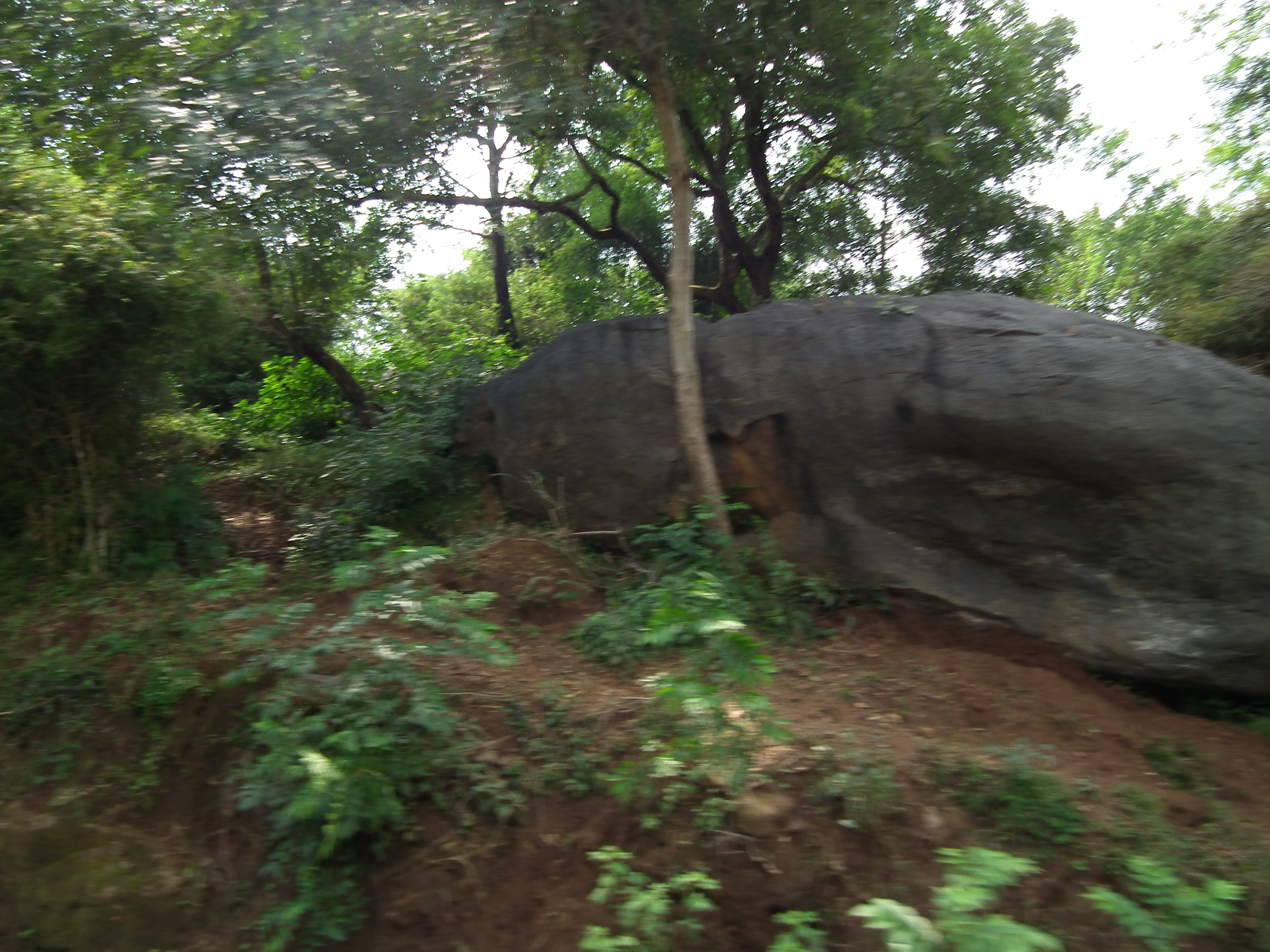

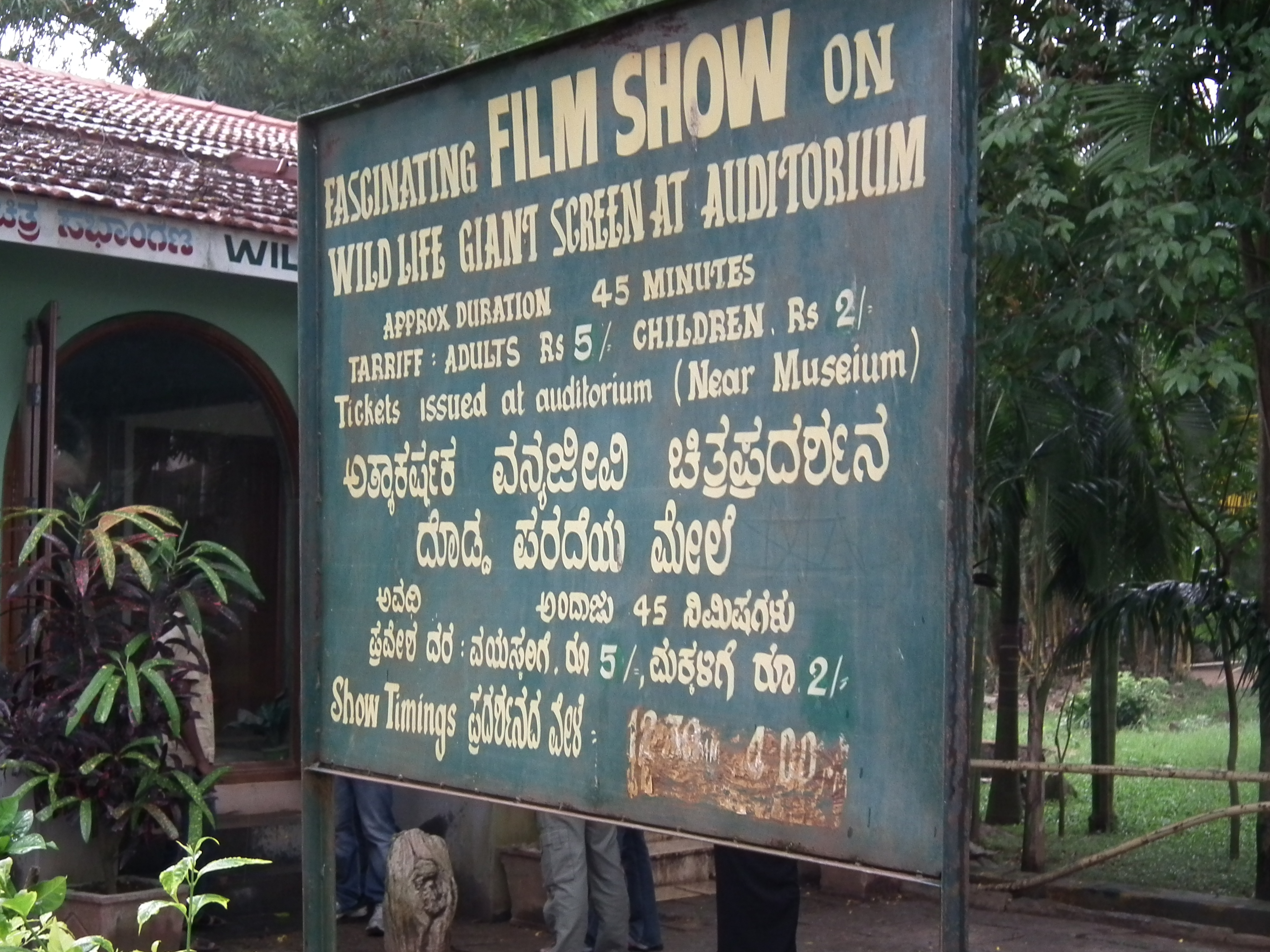

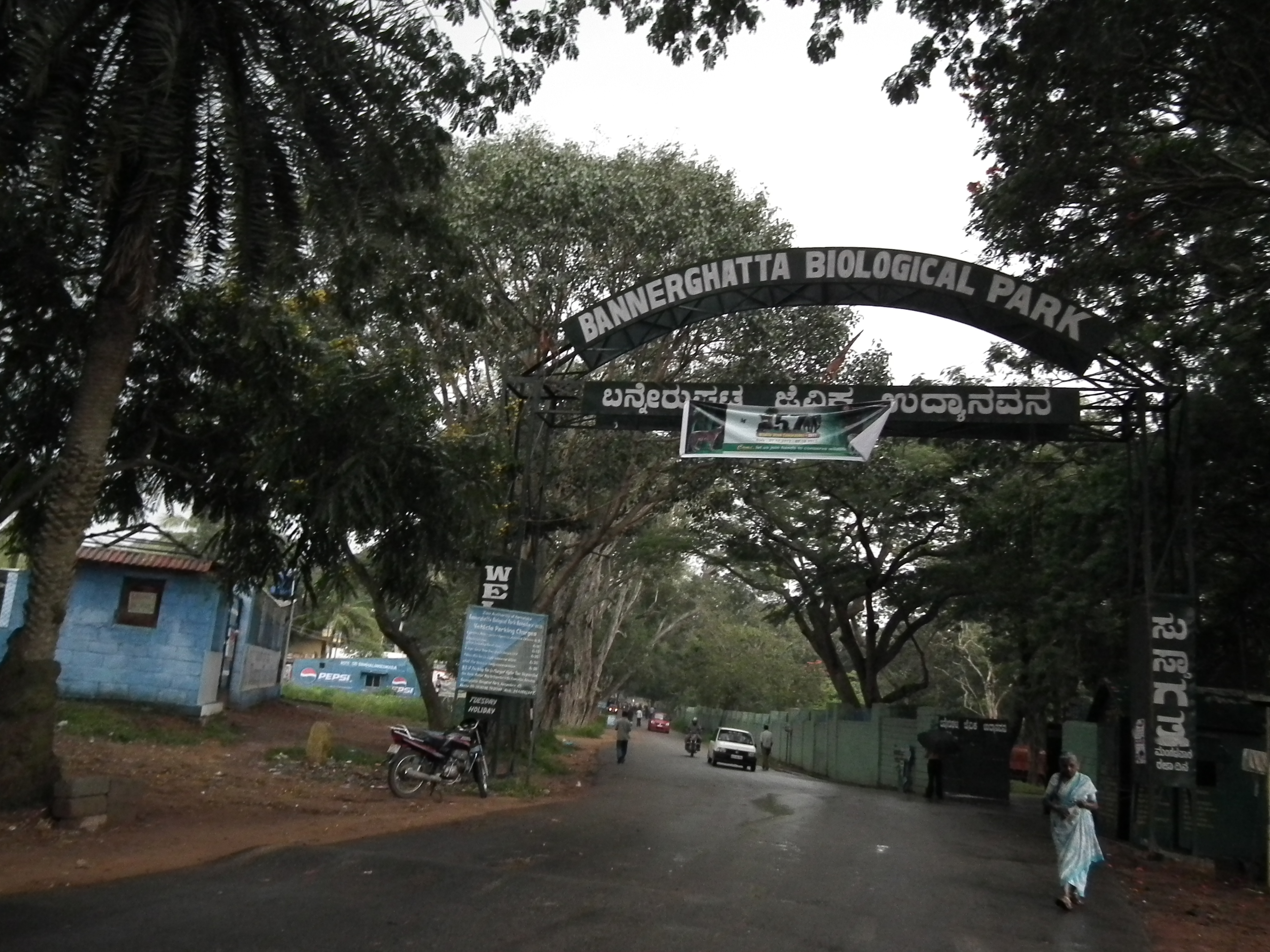

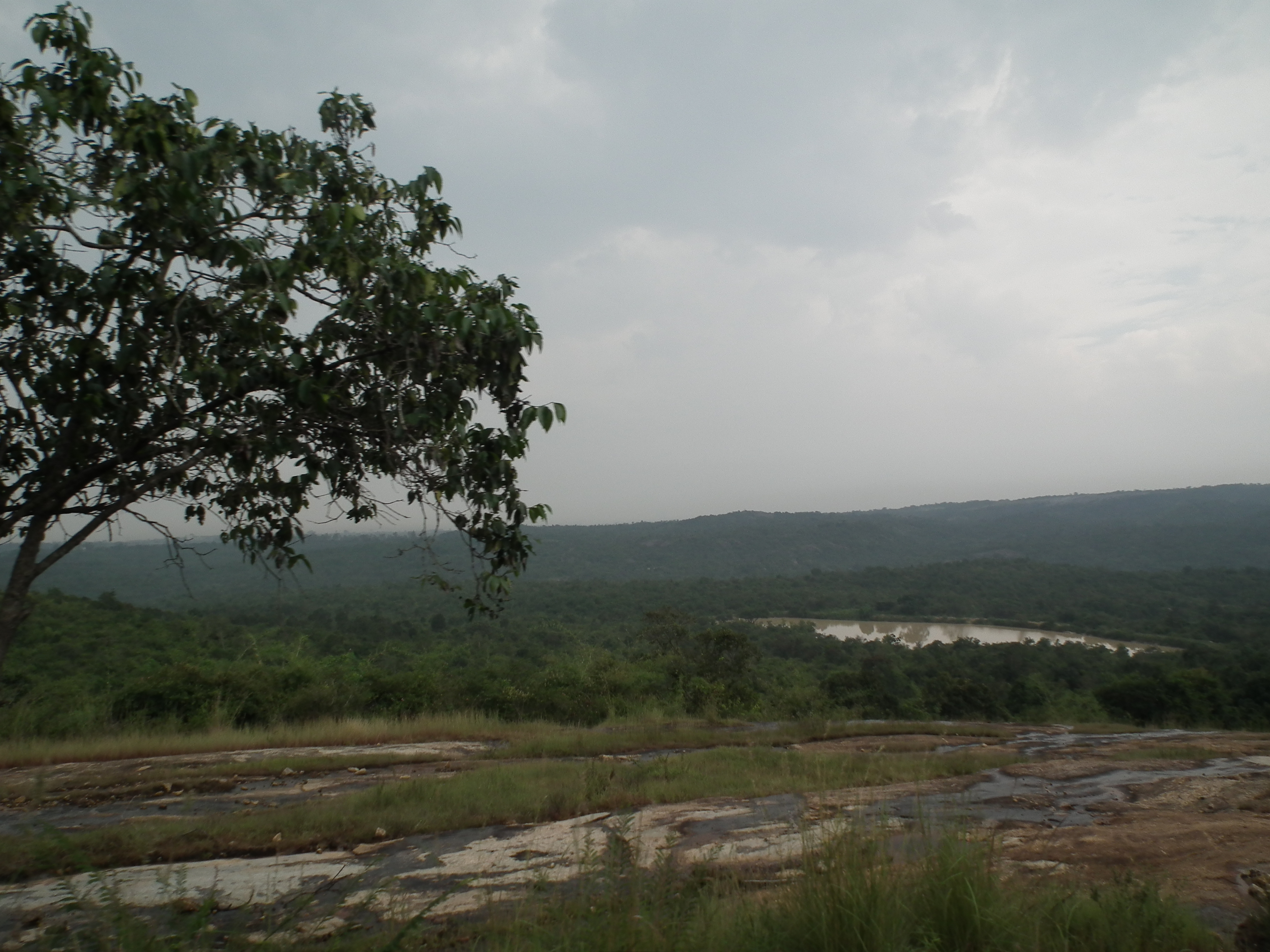

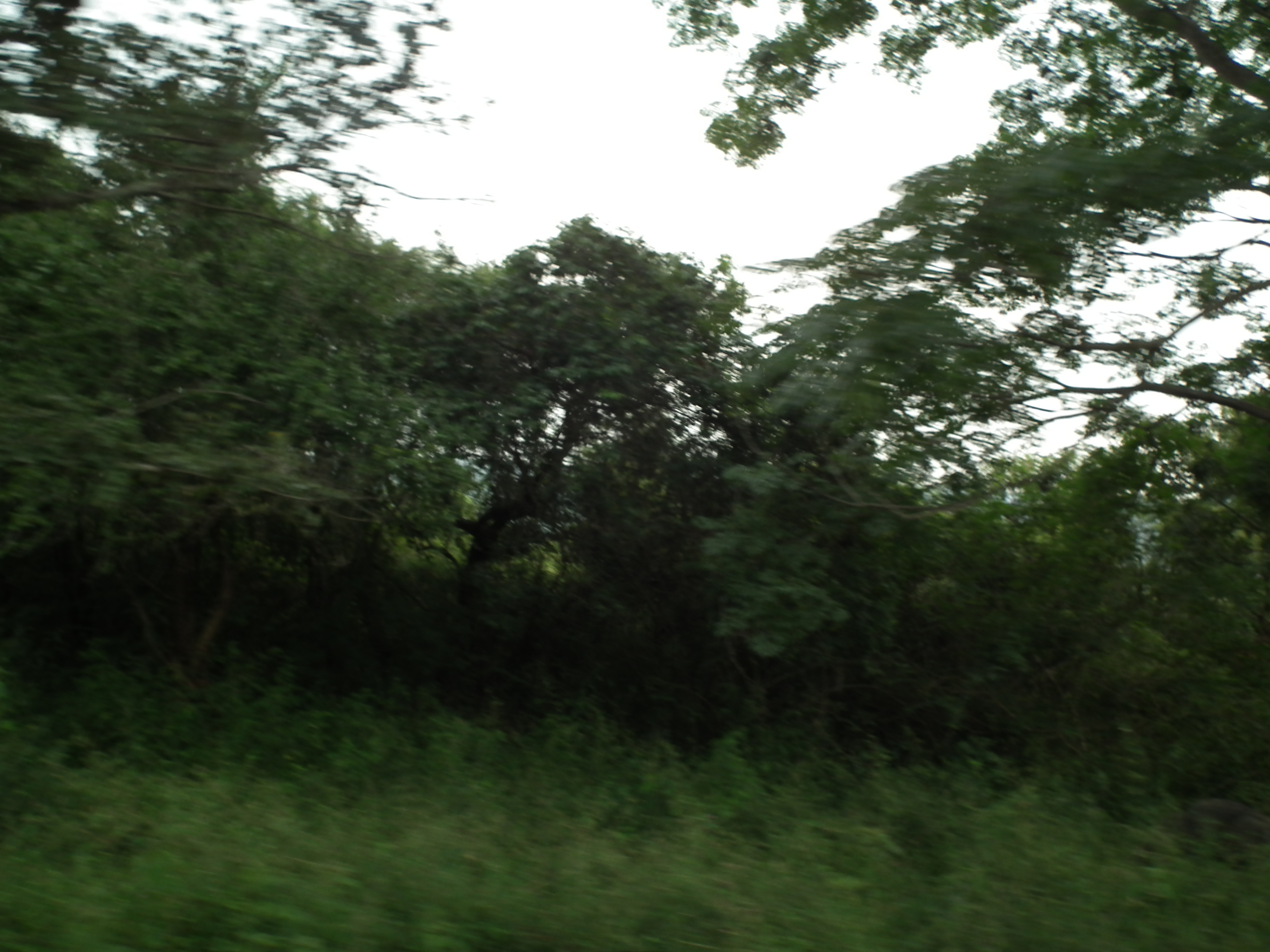

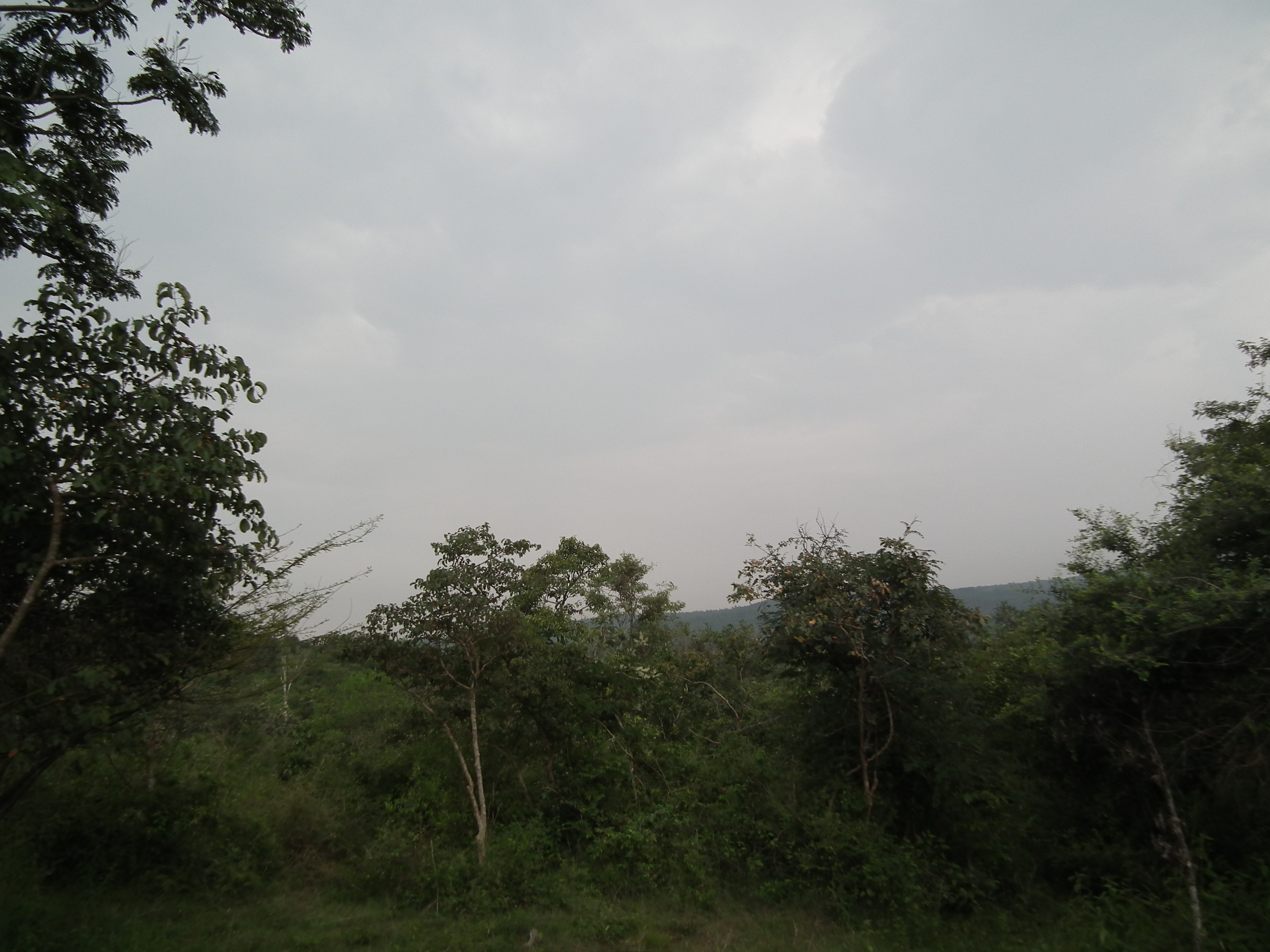

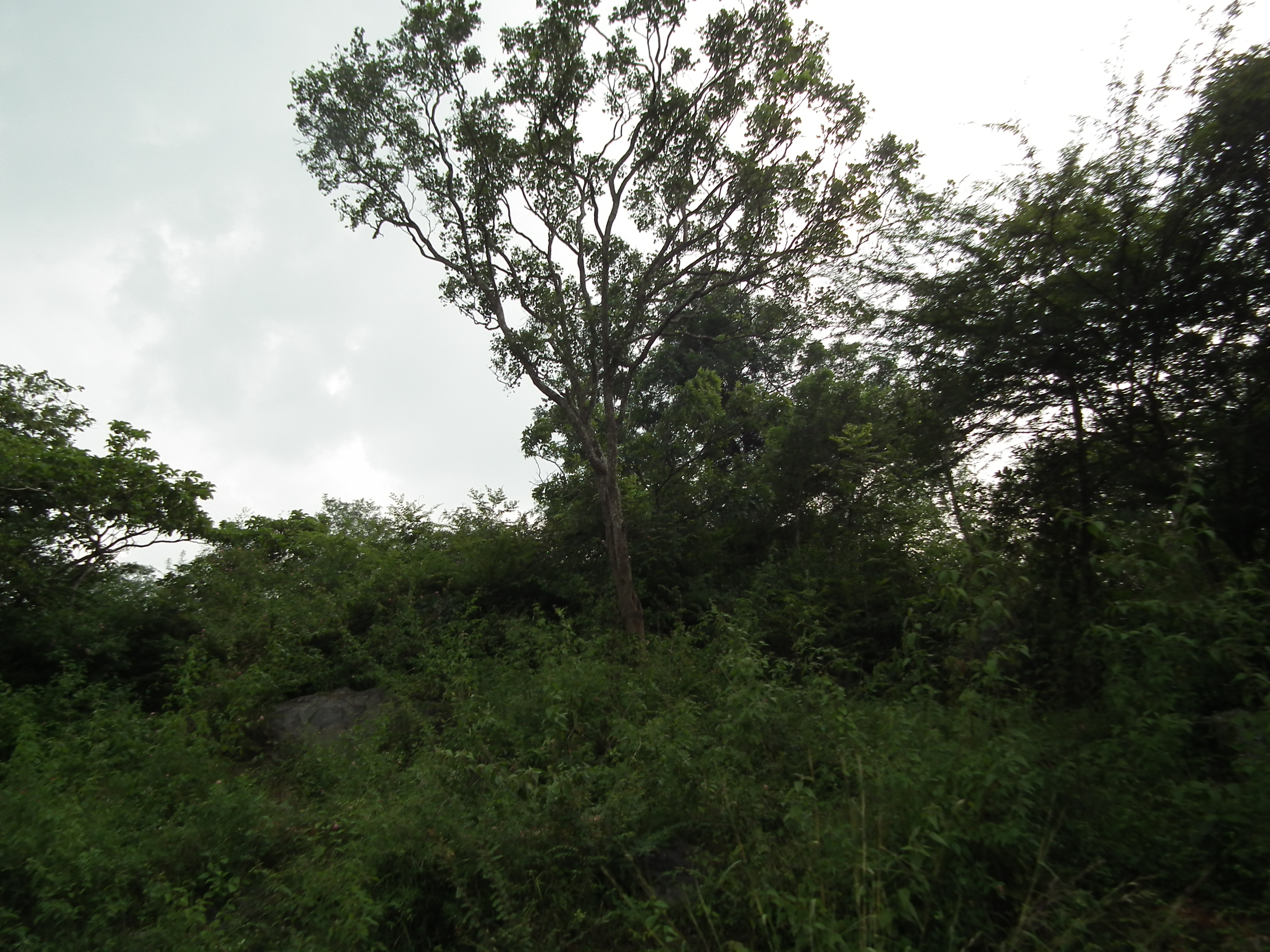

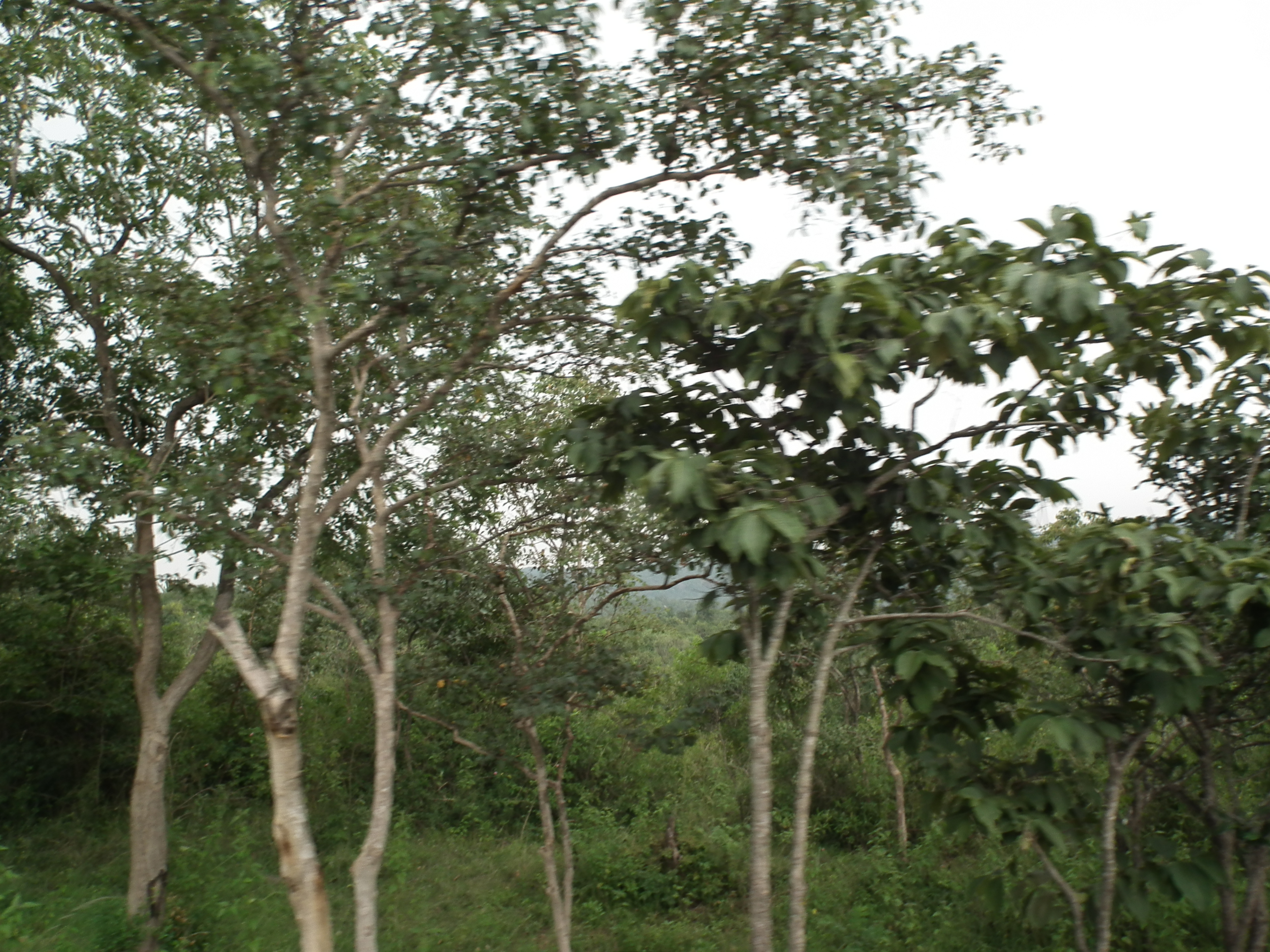

== See also ==
- Bangalore Division
- Bayalu Seeme
- Tyavarekoppa Lion and Tiger Safari
- Wildlife of India
