= Saifai =

- Village
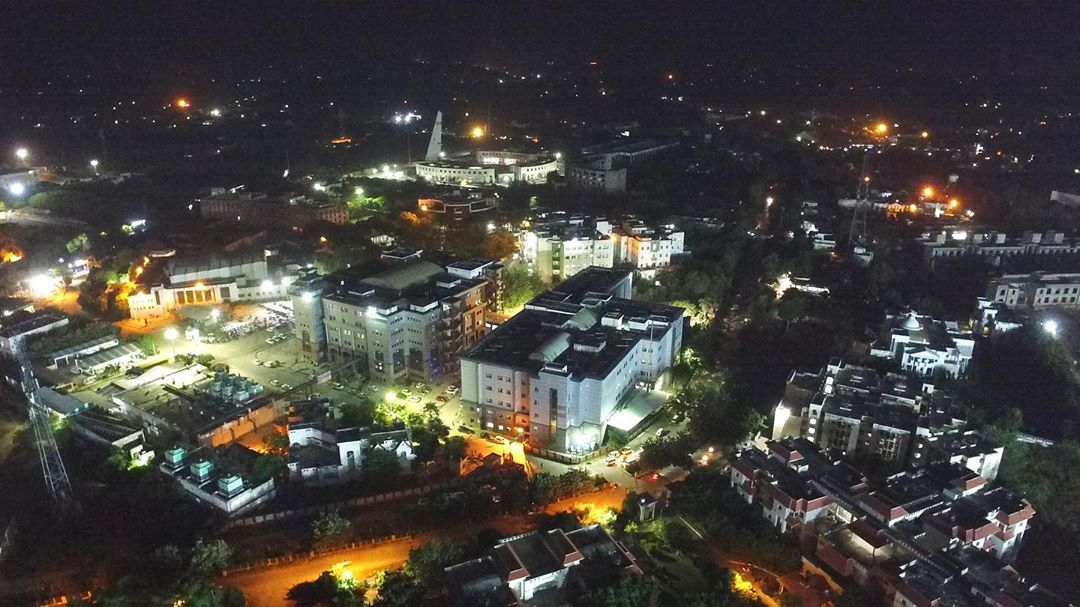
- Night View of Saifai village, Etawah district, U.P.
- Nickname: Saifai village
- Location in Uttar Pradesh, India Saifai (India)
- Coordinates: 26.964°N 78.953°E
- Country: India
- State: Uttar Pradesh
- Division: Kanpur
- District: Etawah

Government
  - Type: Panchayat Raj
  - Body: Gram Panchayat
  - Gram Pradhan (Village head): Ramphal Valmiki

Area
  - Total: 8.8747 km^{2} (3.4265 sq mi)
- Elevation: 102 m (335 ft)

Population (2011)
  - Total: 7,141
  - Density: 804.6/km^{2} (2,084/sq mi)

Languages
  - Official: Hindi
- Time zone: UTC+5:30 (IST)
- PIN: 206130
- Vehicle registration: UP-75
- SDM: Kaushal Kishore, PCS
- DSP/Circle Officer: Pahup Singh
- MP: Dimple Yadav (Mainpuri constituency)
- MLA: Shivpal Singh Yadav (Jaswantnagar constituency)
- Block Pramukh: Mridula Yadav
- Literacy: 82.44%
- Highways: Agra-Lucknow Expressway, State Highway 83 (Uttar Pradesh)
- Website: etawah.nic.in

Saifai is a large village and university town in the Etawah district of the Indian state of Uttar Pradesh. It is also a sub-division (Tehsil) and Block (Kshetra Panchayat) of the Etawah district. It is the birthplace of Mulayam Singh Yadav, the founding president of the Samajwadi Party, former Minister of Defence in India, and former Chief Minister of Uttar Pradesh.

== Geography ==
Saifai, categorised as a village, is situated in Etawah district at the border with Mainpuri district. Its geographical location falls under Ganges-Yamuna Doab of Uttar Pradesh.

Saifai village has an area of 887.47 hectares and Saifai Block (Kshetra Panchayat) is 20,403.30 hectares. Saifai is located 23 km north from the nearest city Etawah. Saifai is about 110 km away from the historic city of Taj Mahal, Agra and 230 km from the State capital Lucknow.

== Saifai Tehsil and Block ==
Saifai is a Sub-Division (Tehsil) and Block (Kshetra Panchayat) of Etawah district, Uttar Pradesh. There are about 60 villages in Saifai block. Saifai Block (Kshetra Panchayat) comes under Jaswantnagar Vidhan Sabha constituency and Mainpuri Lok Sabha constituency.

== Education ==
=== Universities ===
- Uttar Pradesh University of Medical Sciences (formerly U.P. Rural Institute of Medical Sciences and Research) is a medical research public university established by the Government of Uttar Pradesh under Act 15 of 2016. The university has a Medical College, Paramedical College, Nursing College, Pharmacy College, multispeciality 850-bed hospital, and a 150-bed trauma and burn centre. A super specialty hospital with 500 beds has also been established in the university by the Government of Uttar Pradesh.

=== Colleges ===
- Pharmacy College Saifai, established in 2015, was the first government aided pharmacy college run by the Uttar Pradesh Government. Earlier affiliated with UPTU, it is now part of the Uttar Pradesh University of Medical Sciences.

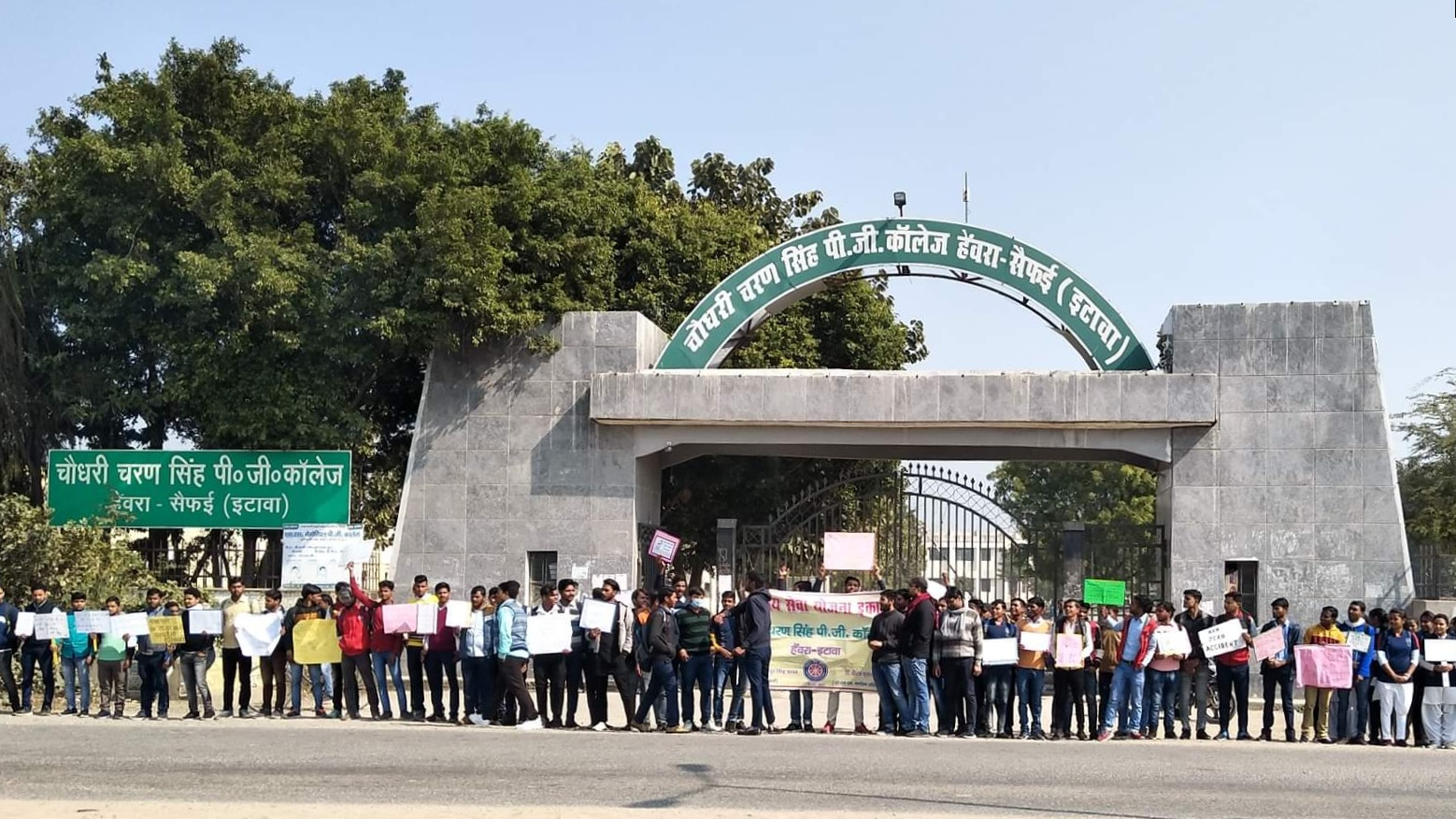
Chaudhary Charan Singh Post Graduate College, Heonra, Saifai

- Chaudhary Charan Singh Post Graduate College, Heonra-Saifai, Etawah or Chaudhary Charan Singh Degree College is a government aided Post Graduate College in Saifai. The college is situated in nearby Heonra village.
- Major Dhyanchand Sports College, a residential sports college established in 2014. It offers teaching from 6th to 12th standard and sports training in cricket, football, hockey, wrestling, athletics, badminton, swimming, and kabaddi.
- Chaudhary Charan Singh College of Law, Heonra-Saifai, Etawah offers an undergraduate course in Law. The college is situated in Heonra village which is part of Saifai Block (Kshetra Panchayat).
- S.S. Memorial Educational Academy, Saifai offers a 2 year B.T.C., which is now known as a Diploma in Elementary Education (D.El.Ed.) in Uttar Pradesh.

=== Training centres ===
- Punjab National Bank (PNB) Farmers' Training Centre, Saifai, established in 2005, it is one of 12 Farmers' Training Centre by PNB. It provides training to farmers, women and rural youth.
- Government Industrial Training Institute, Saifai offers 12 months to 24 months training in various vocational trades.

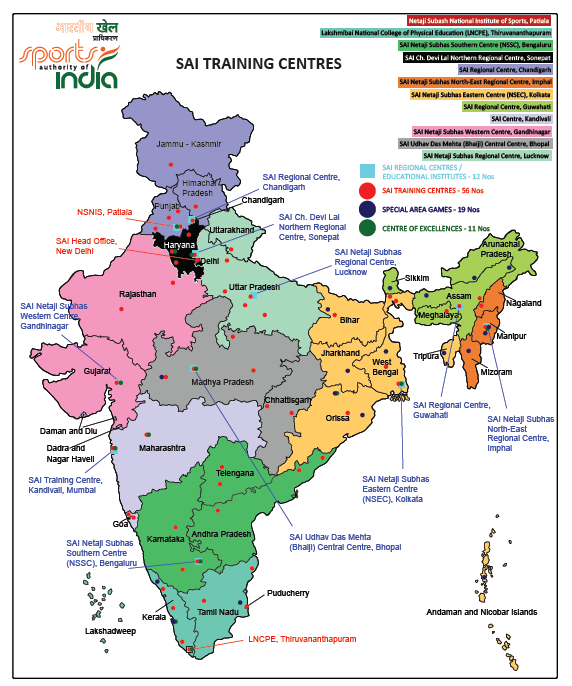
SAI Training Centres across India

- Sports Authority of India (SAI) Training Centre, Saifai in situated in Saifai's Master Chandgi Ram Sports Stadium campus. It offers residential training in Athletics and Handball.
- Cooperative Management Training Centre, Heonra-Saifai is a one of 6 Cooperative Management Training Centres in Uttar Pradesh, while other 5 are situated in Bilari (Moradabad district), Mahoba, Meerut, Varanasi and Ayodhya. It offers 4.5 months short term training in Cooperative, Legal aspects of Cooperatives, Legal aspects of Cooperatives, Business Development Plan and Policy, Financial Accounting and Audit & General Knowledge and Social Work.

== Transport ==
=== Road ===
Saifai village is connected to Mainpuri and Etawah by the four-lane State Highway 83 (Uttar Pradesh). Agra-Lucknow Expressway passes near to Saifai, connecting the area to Delhi, Agra, Kannauj, and Lucknow. Saifai also has a bus station and a depot, owned and operated by Uttar Pradesh State Road Transport Corporation (UPSRTC). UPSRTC buses are available to all major destinations in the state. Saifai Depot has 21 buses as of November 2023.

=== Rail ===
Saifai railway station, also spelled as Saiphai railway station, is located on the newly built Mainpuri-Etawah line railway. It connects Saifai to Etawah railway station, which is on the Howrah–Delhi main line.

=== Airport ===
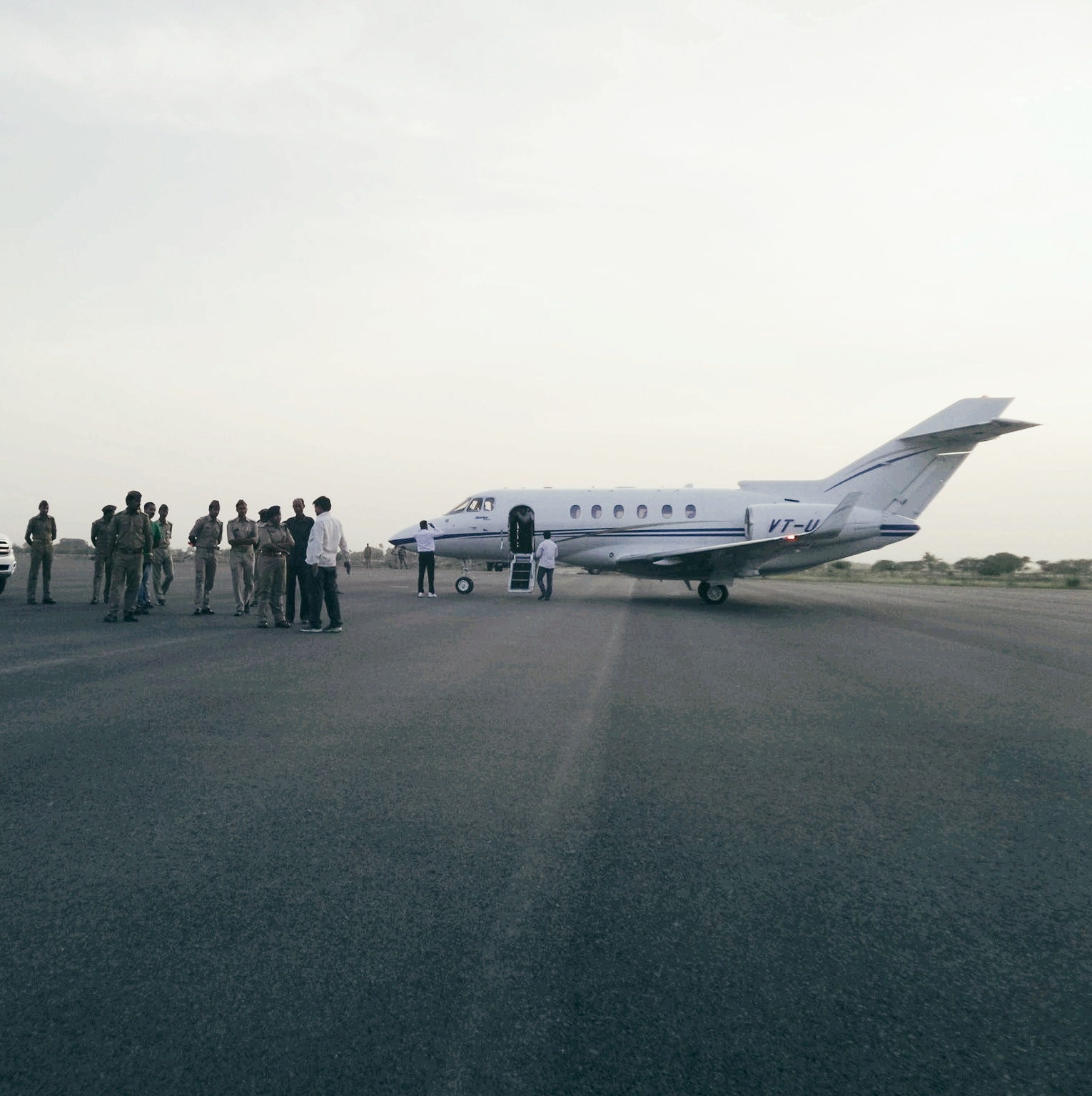
Hawker 900XP of Uttar Pradesh Government at Saifai Airstrip (2016)

The nearest domestic airport from Saifai is Agra Airport (115 Kilometres) and nearest international airport to Saifai is Lucknow International Airport (225 Kilometres). Saifai also has an airstrip. The Saifai airstrip is used only by unscheduled chartered flights. In 2015, the Indian Air Force conducted emergency landing tests at the airstrip with the Mirage 2000 aircraft. In 2018, the air force conducted a second practice exercise at the airstrip. Saifai Airstrip is also used by LAT Aerospace for testing.

== Census 2011 ==
=== Village ===
According to Census 2011, Saifai had 1,481 families, with a population of 7,141 of which 3,917 were male and 3,224 female.

The population of children aged 0–6 is 1,059 which makes up 14.83% of the total population of the village. The average sex ratio of 823 is lower than Uttar Pradesh state average of 912. The child sex ratio of 912 is higher than the Uttar Pradesh average of 902.

The village has a higher literacy rate compared to Uttar Pradesh. In 2011, the literacy rate was 82.44% compared to 67.68% of Uttar Pradesh. Male literacy stood at 89.27% while female literacy was 74.00%.

=== Block (Vikas Khand/Kshetra Panchayat) ===
According to Census 2011, Saifai Block has 19,578 families residing. The Saifai Block (Vikas Khand/Kshetra Panchayat) had a population of 112,620 of which 60,479 are male and 52,141 are female.

== Stadiums ==
According to the newspaper The Hindu, Saifai is in a process to establish itself as a sports and education hub in the state and has two sports complexes.

- Saifai International Cricket Stadium is grouped with an athletics stadium, an indoor stadium, and an indoor swimming pool at the Major Dhyanchand Sports College campus.
- Master Chandgiram Sports Stadium, named after Haryanvi wrestler Chandgi Ram, is a national-level sports complex with a hockey pitch, a multipurpose (badminton and wrestling) hall, and a swimming pool.

== Saifai Mahotsav ==
Organised between 1997 and 2015, Saifai Mahotsav (officially the Ranveer Singh Smriti Saifai Mahotsav) was an annual 15-day cultural fair organised by the Ranveer Singh Smriti Saifai Mahotsav committee. It used to take place in the village every year during December and January. It was started in 1997 by Ranveer Singh Yadav, the nephew of Mulayam Singh Yadav and father of Tej Pratap Singh Yadav, as a small village fair named Saifai Mahotsav. It was renamed as the Ranveer Singh Smriti Saifai Mahotsav after his death in 2002. The festival's closing ceremony which was also known as Bollywood Night was often controversial due to the participation of Bollywood celebrities. The organisation of Saifai Mahotsav was cancelled in 2017 during the BJP's government and has not been organised since.

== Notable people ==
- Akhilesh Yadav, 20th Chief Minister of Uttar Pradesh (March 2012 - March 2017)
- Mulayam Singh Yadav, founder president of Samajwadi Party, former Minister of Defence (India) & former Chief Minister of Uttar Pradesh
- Shivpal Singh Yadav
- Tej Pratap Singh Yadav
