= Bir Bahadur Singh Sports College =

Sports college in Gorakhpur, India

Bir Bahadur Singh Sports College, Gorakhpur
- Type: Sports college
- Established: 1988
- Affiliations: Uttar Pradesh Sports Colleges Society
- Academic affiliations: U.P. Board
- Principal: Aale Haydar
- Students: 320
- Location: Gorakhpur, Uttar Pradesh, India; 26.7986°N 83.3834°E
- Campus: Gorakhpur
- Website: bbssportscollege.in
- Location within Uttar Pradesh

Bir Bahadur Singh Sports College, Gorakhpur is a residential sports college in Gorakhpur, Uttar Pradesh, established in 1988. It offers sports training in football, hockey, wrestling, athletics, badminton, swimming and kabaddi in 6th to 12th standard and with the curriculum of the U.P. Board. It is the second sports college established in Uttar Pradesh after Guru Gobind Singh Sports College of Lucknow and before Etawah's Saifai Sports College.

== History ==
After the success of Guru Gobind Singh Sports College, Lucknow, the government of Uttar Pradesh established this sports college in Gorakhpur in 1988–1989.

== Notable alumni ==
- Preeti Dubey, Indian Women's Hockey team (2016 Summer Olympics)

== See also ==
- Maharana Pratap Sports College, Dehradun
- Motilal Nehru School of Sports, Rai, Sonipat
