= Mainpuri–Etawah line =

Railway line in Northern India

Overview
- Status: Operational
- Owner: Indian Railways
- Locale: Uttar Pradesh
- Termini: Etawah Junction (ETW); Mainpuri (MNQ)
- Stations: 7

Service
- System: Branch line
- Operator: North Central Railway

History
- Opened: 28 December 2016; 9 years ago

Technical
- Line length: 55.16 km (34 mi)
- Track length: 1,676 mm (5 ft 6 in)
- Number of tracks: 1
- Character: At Grade
- Track gauge: 5 ft 6 in (1,676 mm) broad gauge
- Electrification: 25 kV 50 Hz AC OHLE
- Operating speed: 100 km/h (62 mph)

The Mainpuri–Etawah line is a railway line in northern India. It connects Mainpuri to Etawah Junction via Saifai.

== History ==
Foundation stone of this railway track was laid in 2004 by then-President of India Dr. A. P. J. Abdul Kalam in Saifai.

On 28 December 2016 first time a passenger train (71910-Agra Cantonment – Mainpuri DEMU) run on this railway track.

In 2019, Bharat Heavy Electricals Limited got the order for electrification of the track. Electrification of the track was completed in February 2022.

== Route and halts ==
Mainpuri – Etawah line
#	Station Name	Station Code	Connections
1	Etawah Junction	ETW	Howrah–Delhi main line
2	Baidpur	BPUR	
3	Saifai	SIPI	
4	Karhal	KAHL	
5	Bhujia	BUJA	
6	Kiratpur	KAPU	
7	Mainpuri	MNQ	Farrukhabad–Shikohabad line
