= Saifai railway station =

Railway station in Saifai, India

- Indian Railways logo

General information
- Other names: Saiphai railway station
- Location: Etawah–Mainpuri Road (SH83), Saifai, Uttar Pradesh; India
- Coordinates: 26.9641°N 78.9519°E
- Elevation: 151 metres (495 ft)
- System: Indian Railways station
- Owner: Indian Railways
- Operator: North Central Railway
- Line: Mainpuri–Etawah line
- Platforms: 1
- Tracks: 1

Construction
- Structure type: Standard (on-ground station)
- Parking: No
- Cycle facilities: No
- Accessible: No

Other information
- Status: Single line (Electrified)
- Station code: SIPI
- Zone(s): North Central Railway
- Division(s): Prayagraj

History
- Opened: 28 December 2016; 9 years ago
- Electrified: 2022
Location
- Location within India Location within Uttar Pradesh

Saifai railway station, also spelled as Saiphai railway station is a small railway station in Saifai (Etawah district), Uttar Pradesh. Its code is SIPI. It serves Saifai village. The station consists of only one platform. The platform is not well sheltered. It lacks many facilities including water and sanitation. It is located on newly built Mainpuri-Etawah railway track.

In 2004, then President of India Dr. A. P. J. Abdul Kalam laid the foundation stone of this railway track in Saifai.
