= Thakur Jugal Kishore Sinha =

Indian politician

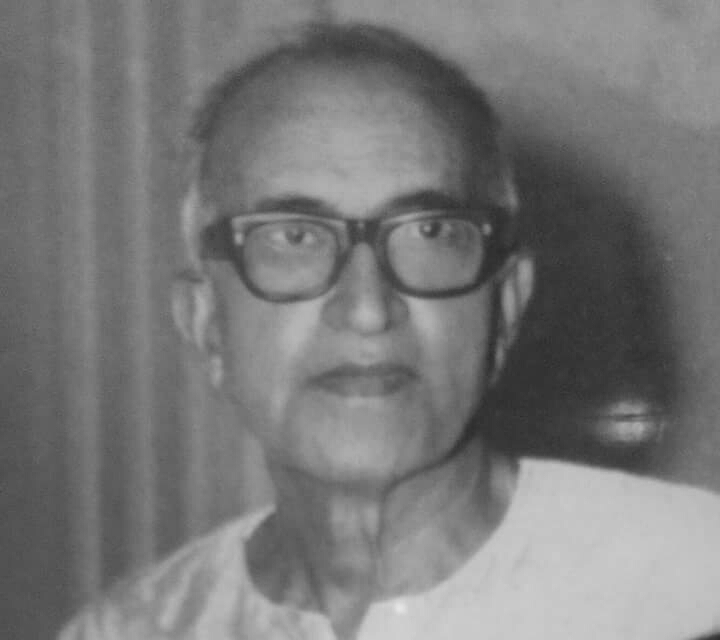
- Thakur Jugal Kishore Sinha

Member: 1st Lok Sabha

Personal details
- Born: 1908 Village Dumari Sitamarhi
- Died: 1980 (aged 71–72) Patna
- Spouse: Ram Dulari Sinha
- Children: Dr. Madhurendra Kumar Singh

Thakur Jugal Kishore Sinha or JK Sinha (1908–1980) was an Indian politician, member of the first Lok Sabha and independence activist. He was elected as the member of the parliament in the 1st Lok Sabha from Muzaffarpur-North-West Bihar parliamentary constituency in 1953 (present-day Sheohar constituency). He is known as the"Father of cooperative movement" in India for his contribution to the Cooperative Movement in India and on his initiation the cooperative departments in the Government were established and started by the first Prime Minister of India Pandit Jawaharlal Nehru. And his participation in the Indian independence movement was such that he had been imprisoned several times.

He married Ram Dulari Sinha, an independence activist who later became Union Minister and then Governor of Kerala.

== Publication ==
- 1932; Edited 'BALIDAN' and 'KARA and KAIDI' (Manuscript) in Motihari Jail, while he was imprisoned for his participation in the freedom movement
