= Etawah Safari Park =

Safari park in India

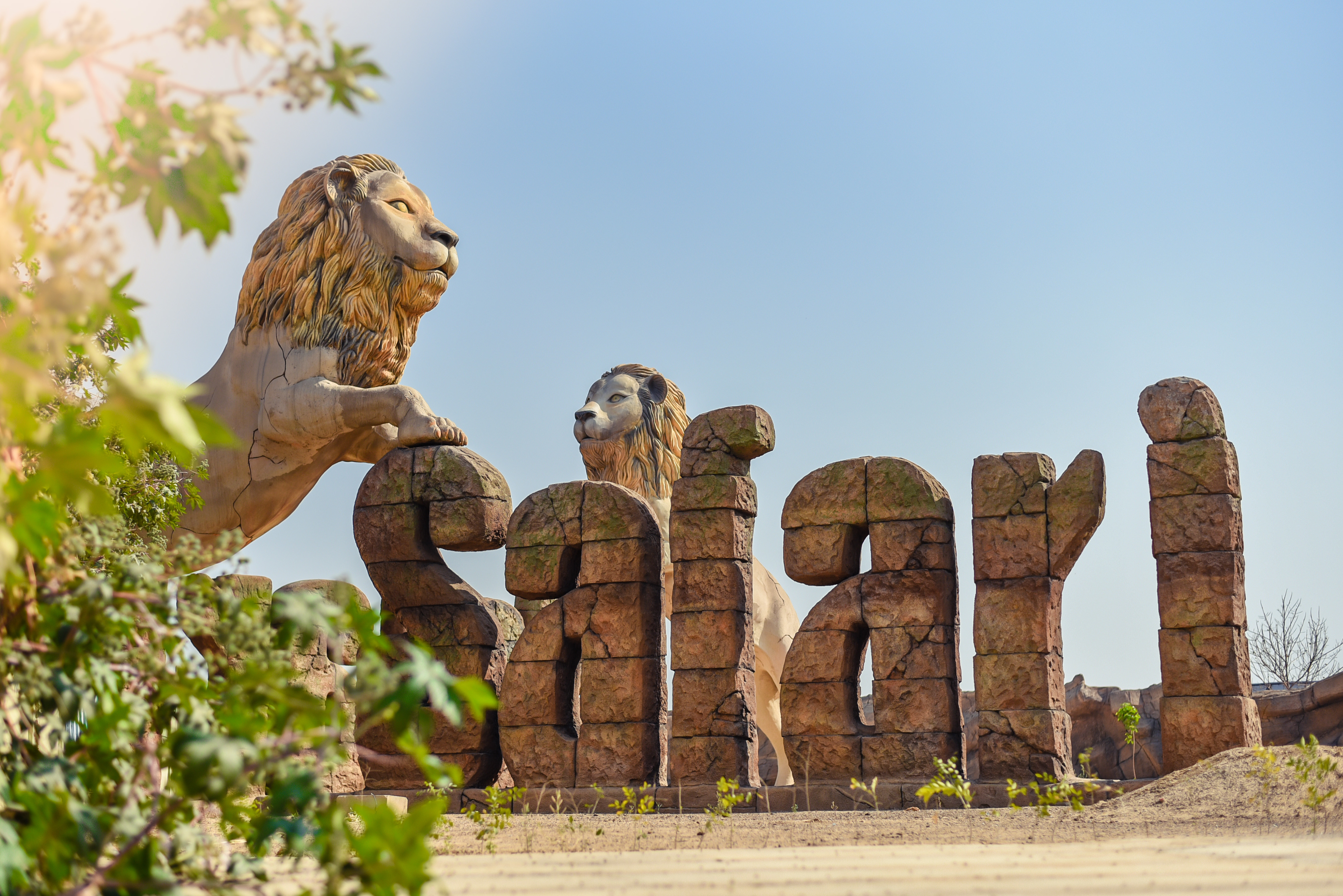
- Etawah Safari Park entrance
- Interactive map of Etawah Safari Park
- 26.767261°N 79.001896°E
- Date opened: 24 November 2019; 6 years ago
- Location: Etawah, Uttar Pradesh, India
- Land area: 350 hectares (860 acres)
- No. of animals: 260 (March 2023)
- No. of species: 5
- Annual visitors: ▼110,023 (2023-24 Financial Year)
- Owner: Forest Department, Government of Uttar Pradesh
- Director: Anil Patel, IFS
- Public transit: Etawah Junction railway station, Agra Airport, Gwalior Airport
- Website: etawahlionsafari.org

Etawah Safari Park (formerly Etawah Lion Safari) is a drive-through safari park in Etawah, Uttar Pradesh, India. It was opened to the public in November 2019. It includes multiple safaris, an Asiatic lion breeding centre and a visitor centre.

== History ==
Etawah Lion Safari was first proposed in 2006. Work was started in May 2012. The park was designed by Spanish company Art Urbà. At first, eleven lions were migrated to the park in 2014. In 2015 a deer safari, antelope safari, bear safari and leopard safari were added and the park was renamed as Etawah Safari Park. The deer safari was inaugurated on 6 October 2016 and the remaining safaris as well as the park itself were inaugurated on 1 June 2018. The park opened to the public on 24 November 2019 without the lion segment.

== Safaris ==
Multiple safaris includes a lion safari, a deer safari, an antelope safari, a bear safari and a leopard safari. As of November 2019, the lion and leopard safaris are waiting for approval from the Central Zoo Authority (CZA).

== Asiatic lion breeding centre ==
The Asiatic lion breeding centre has twelve breeding dens. It was started with eleven lions that arrived in September 2014 mostly from zoos of Gujarat. Four of the lions and five cubs died because of canine distemper, after which the lions were vaccinated by an imported vaccine from the US. As of December 2020, the center has nine cubs who are born there.

== Facilities ==
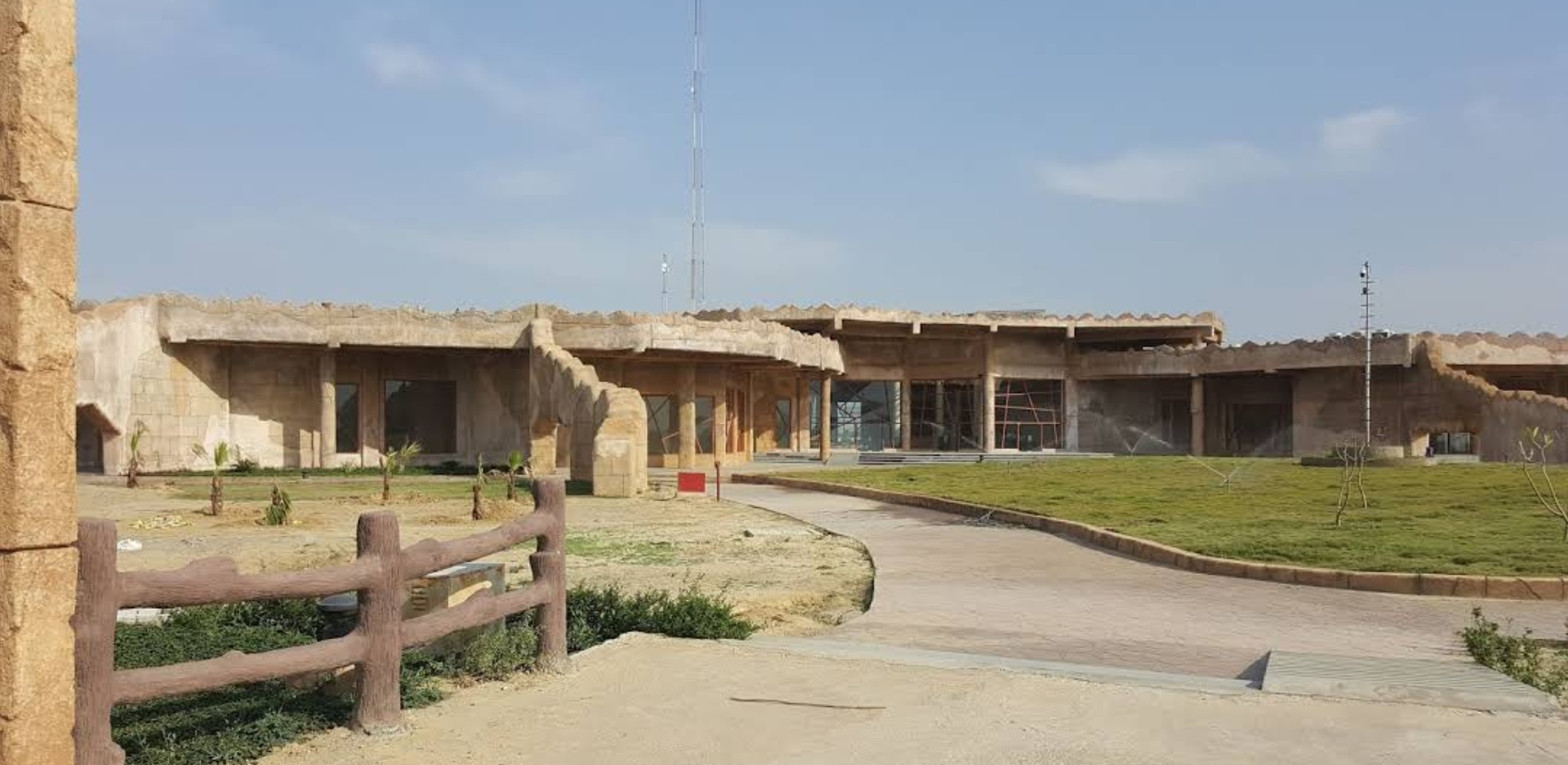
Visitor Facilitation Centre

A visitor facilitation centre includes a multimedia museum with digital signage and large format displays, and a '4D' education theatre for informing and guiding visitors.

== Statistics ==
Number of Visitors
Financial Year	Indian Adult and Teenager	Indian Children (0-6yr)	Indian Children (6-12yr)	Total Indian	Total Foreigners	Total Visitors	Reference
2022-2023	90326	8920	19474	118720	26	118746	
2023-2024	85291	8489	16217	109997	26	110023	

== See also ==
- Taj Mahal
- Saman Bird Sanctuary
- Sarsai Nawar Wetland
- Gir National Park
- Asiatic Lion Reintroduction Project
- Tiger and Lion Safari
- Etawah gharana
