= Chaudhary Charan Singh College of Law =

Law college in Saifai, Uttar Pradesh, India

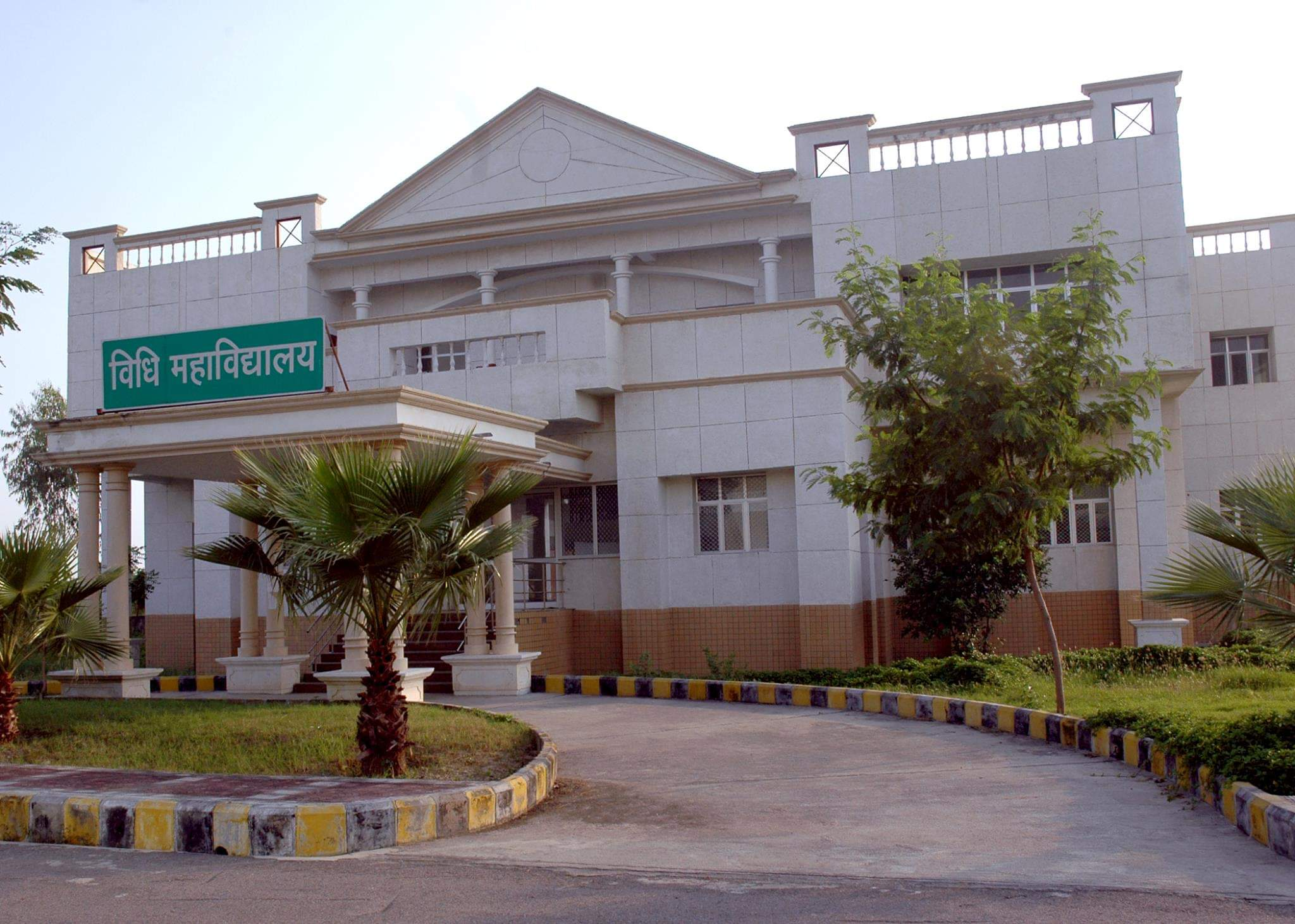
- Other name: Chaudhary Charan Singh Vidhi Mahavidyalaya
- Type: Private Law College
- Established: 2012; 14 years ago
- Academic affiliations: Chhatrapati Shahu Ji Maharaj University, Bar Council of India
- President: Shivpal Singh Yadav
- Principal: Narendra Pratap Singh
- Academic staff: 5
- Location: Heonra, Saifai, Etawah, Uttar Pradesh, India; 26.9381957°N 78.9646116°E
- Website: ccsvm.org

Chaudhary Charan Singh College of Law or Chaudhary Charan Singh Vidhi Mahavidyalaya is a private law college established in 2012 adjacent to Saifai of Etawah district, Uttar Pradesh, India. It is first college of Etawah district which got approval of Bar Council of India to run LL.B. course.

== Campus ==
It is situated inside Chaudhary Charan Singh Post Graduate College campus in Heonra (adjacent to Saifai) and is run by same management council.

== Affiliation ==
It offers under-graduate course in law i.e. 3 year LL.B. It is affiliated to Chhatrapati Shahu Ji Maharaj University and approved by The Bar Council of India for 120 students every year in 3 year LL.B. from 2012.
