= Chaudhary Charan Singh Post Graduate College =

College in Uttar Pradesh, India

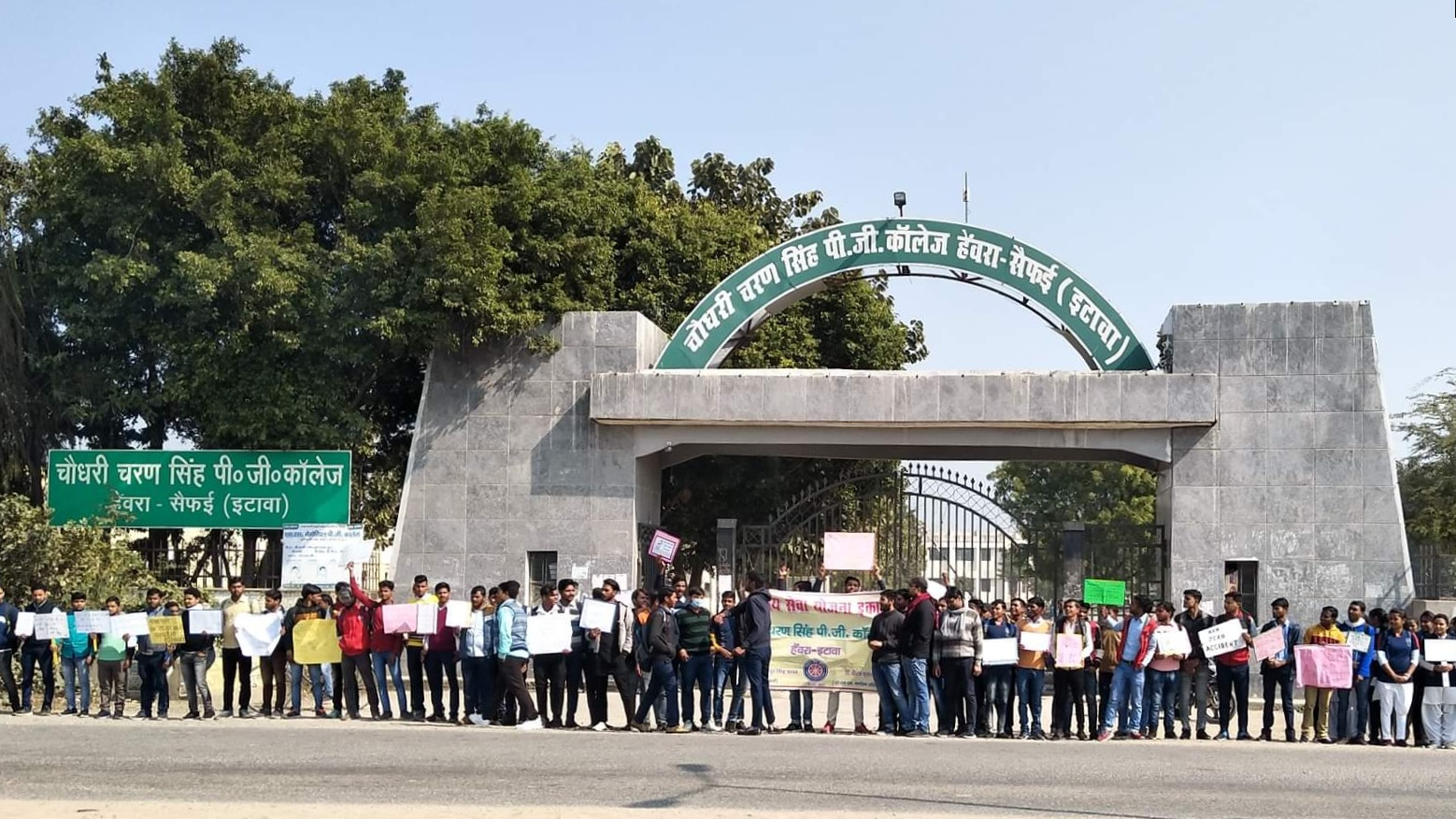
- Other name: Chaudhary Charan Singh Degree College
- Type: Government Aided
- Established: 1983; 43 years ago
- Founder: Mulayam Singh Yadav
- Academic affiliations: Chhatrapati Shahu Ji Maharaj University, All India Council for Technical Education, National Council for Teacher Education
- President: Shivpal Singh Yadav
- Principal: Shailendra Kumar Sharma
- Academic staff: 99
- Students: 4806
- Undergraduates: 3710
- Postgraduates: 1096
- Location: Heonra (Saifai), Etawah, Uttar Pradesh, 206130, India; 26.9385325°N 78.9635343°E
- Website: www.ccspg.org

Chaudhary Charan Singh Post Graduate College or Chaudhary Charan Singh Degree College is a government aided private college at Heonra, a village adjacent to Saifai in Etawah, Uttar Pradesh, India. It was established as Chaudhary Charan Singh Degree College by Mulayam Singh Yadav in 1983. It is affiliated to Chhatrapati Shahu Ji Maharaj University (formerly Kanpur University) and offers under-graduate and post-graduate courses in science, arts, commerce, agriculture, computer application, management, education, library & information science and physical education.

== Management ==
The college is run by the Shiksha Prasar Samiti society, presided by Shivpal Singh Yadav.

== AICTE and NCTE Approval ==
This college is All India Council for Technical Education (AICTE) approved to run Bachelor of Computer Application (BCA) and Bachelor of Business Administration (BBA) degrees. This college is also National Council for Teacher Education (NCTE) approved to run Bachelor of Education (B.Ed.), Master of Education (M.Ed.) and Bachelor of Physical Education (B.P.Ed.) degrees.

== Krishak Chatravriti Yojna ==
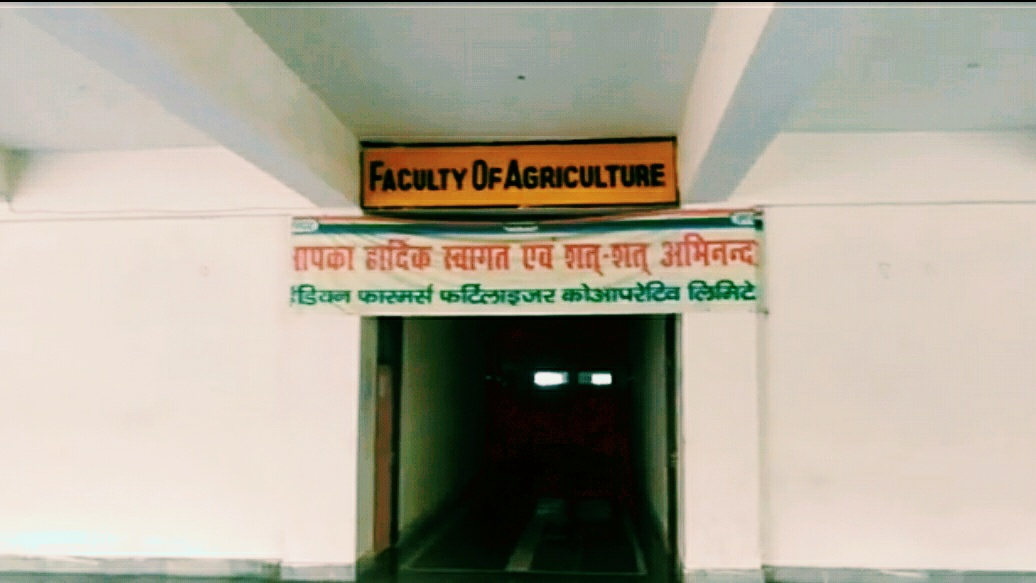
Faculty of Agriculture - Chaudhary Charan Singh Post Graduate College, Heonra, Saifai, Etawah

In 2023, this college became a part of Mukhyamantri Krishak Chatravriti Yojna. By Mukhyamantri Krishak Chatravriti Yojna now Agriculture degree students of this college can get a per month scholarship of ₹3,000.

== Law College ==
Chaudhary Charan Singh College of Law is a law college in CCS PG College campus, established in 2012. It offers under-graduate course in law i.e. 3 year LL.B. It is affiliated to Chhatrapati Shahu Ji Maharaj University and The Bar Council of India for 120 students every year in 3 year LL.B. from 2012.

== Notable alumni ==
- Arvind Pratap, former MLC
- Jaswinder Bhalla
