= Etawah Junction railway station =

Railway station in Uttar Pradesh, India

ETAWAH JUNCTION

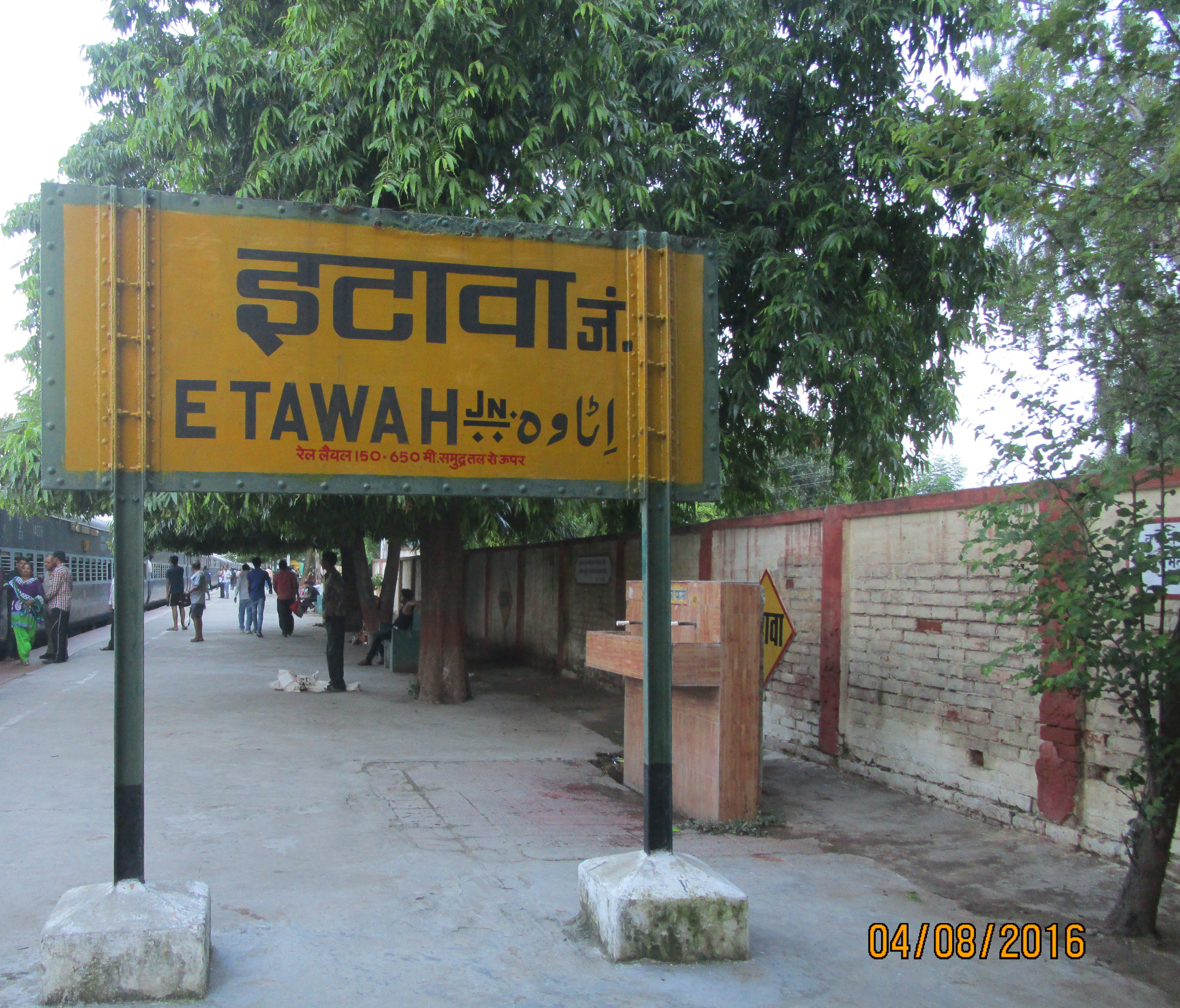

General information
- Location: Station Road, Etawah, Uttar Pradesh; India
- Coordinates: 26°47′11″N 79°01′20″E
- Elevation: 154 metres (505 ft)
- System: Indian Railway Station
- Owner: Indian Railways
- Operator: North Central Railway
- Lines: Howrah-Gaya-Delhi line Howrah–Delhi main line Etawah–Indore section Etawah–Bah–Agra line Mainpuri–Etawah line.
- Platforms: 5

Construction
- Structure type: At grade
- Parking: Yes
- Cycle facilities: Yes

Other information
- Status: Functioning
- Station code: ETW
- Division(s): Prayagraj

History
- Opened: 1866
- Electrified: 1961–63
Location
- Location within Uttar Pradesh Location within India
- Interactive map of Etawah Junction

Etawah Junction railway station (station code ETW) is one of the main railway stations on the Kanpur–Delhi section of Howrah–Delhi main line and Howrah-Gaya-Delhi line. It is 139 km (86 mi) away from Kanpur Central.Tundla is 92 km (57 mi) from here, from where lines to Agra bifurcates. It is located in Etawah district in the Indian state of Uttar Pradesh. It serves Etawah and the surrounding areas. Etawah stands near the confluence of the Yamuna and the Chambal.

== History ==
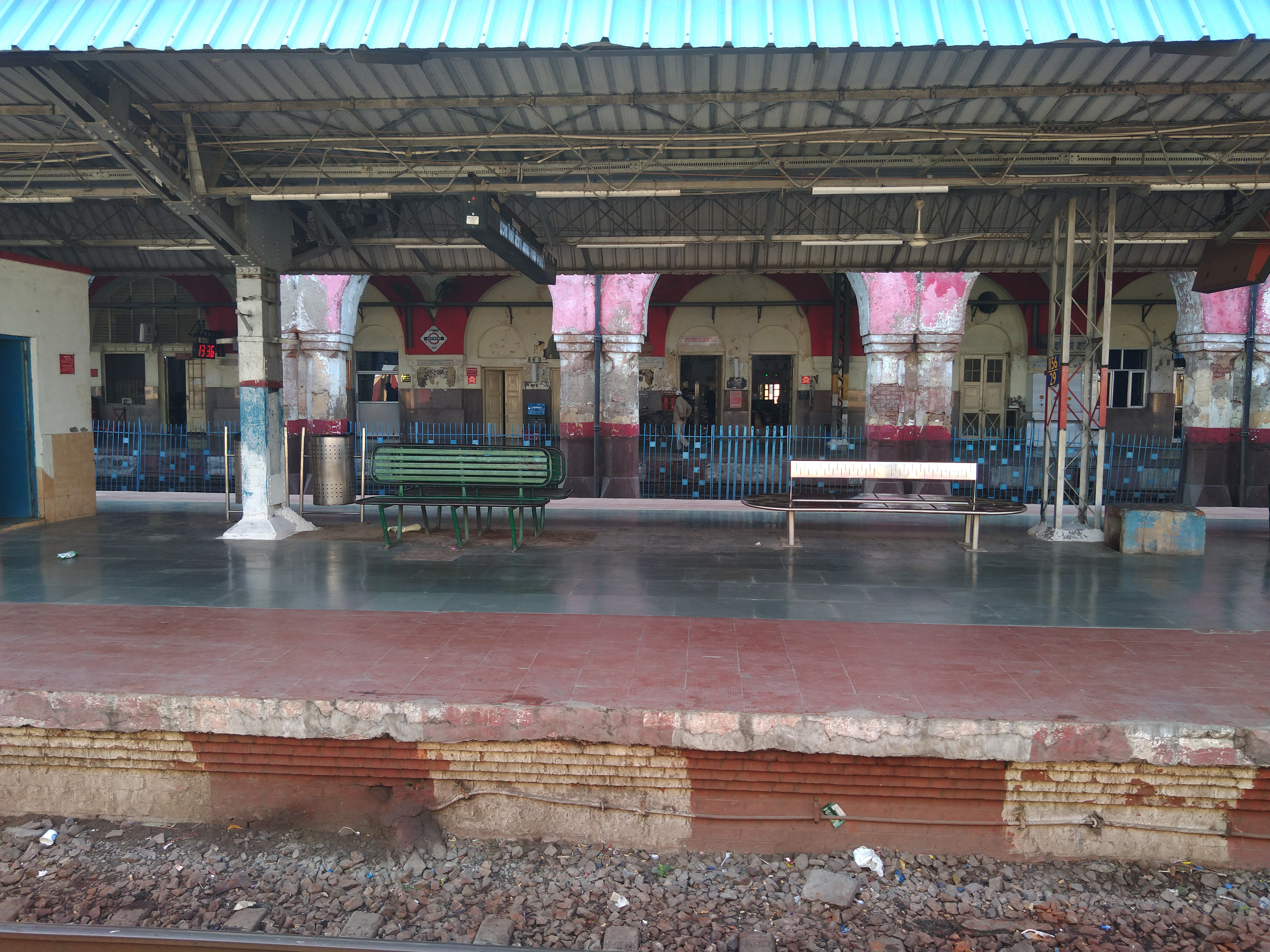
Station platform

The East Indian Railway Company initiated efforts to develop a railway line from Howrah to Delhi in the mid nineteenth century. Even when the line to Mughalsarai was being constructed and only the lines near Howrah were put in operation, the first train ran from Allahabad to Kanpur in 1859 and the Kanpur–Etawah section was opened to traffic in the 1860s. For the first through train from Howrah to Delhi in 1864, coaches were ferried on boats across the Yamuna at Allahabad. With the completion of the Old Naini Bridge across the Yamuna through trains started running in 1865–66.

In 2015, Etawah railway station was developed into a Junction after completion of Etawah–Bhind–Gwalior & Etawah–Mainpuri railline. The first passenger train on this route was started on 27 February 2016. The Etawah–Mainpuri railway line is also operational since 2017.

== Electrification ==
The Kanpur–Panki sector was electrified in 1968–69, Panki–Tundla in 1971–72.

Preceding station	Indian Railways	Following station
Ekdil towards ?	North Central Railway zone Kanpur–Delhi section	Sarai Bhopat Railway Station towards ?
