= Gopi Sonkar =

Indian field hockey player

Personal information
- Full name: Gopi Kumar Sonkar
- Citizenship: India
- Born: 10 April 2000 (age 26) Banaras
- Occupation: sport

Sport
- Country: India
- Sport: Hockey
- Position: Midfielder
- Team: Uttar Pradesh Hockey

Gopi Sonkar (born 10 April 2000), also known as Gopi Kumar, is an Indian field hockey player and a member of Indian field hockey team. He represented India in 2018 Sultan of Johor Cup held at Malaysia.

He also participated in 9th Hockey India Junior Men National Championship 2019 (Div ‘A’) held at the Sports Authority of India, Western Training Centre, Aurangabad

== Early life and career ==
He started training at Vivek Singh Academy, then joined Saifai Sports Hostel where his maternal uncle Rajesh trained him. He is the elder between two sisters and three brothers. His father Pyarelal Sonkar used to sell fruits at Pandeypur Chowk.
