= Firozabad Lok Sabha constituency =

Constituency of the Indian parliament in Uttar Pradesh

Coordinates: 27.15°N 78.4°E

Firozabad UP-83
- Lok Sabha constituency
- Interactive Map Outlining Firozabad Lok Sabha constituency

Constituency details
- Country: India
- Region: North India
- State: Uttar Pradesh
- Assembly constituencies: Tundla; Jasrana; Firozabad; Shikohabad; Sirsaganj
- Established: 1957
- Total electors: 18,90,875
- Reservation: None

Member of Parliament
- 18th Lok Sabha
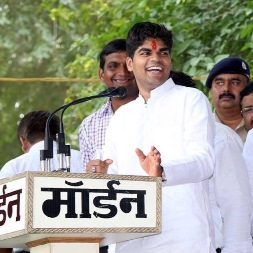
- Incumbent Akshay Yadav
- Party: Samajwadi Party
- Alliance: INDIA
- Elected year: 2024

Firozabad (Hindustani pronunciation: [fɪɾoːzaːbaːd̪]) is a Lok Sabha parliamentary constituency in Uttar Pradesh.

== Assembly Segments ==
No	Name	District	Member	Party	2024 Lead
95	Tundla (SC)	Firozabad	Prempal Singh Dhangar	BJP	BJP
96	Jasrana	Firozabad	Sachin Yadav	SP	SP
97	Firozabad	Firozabad	Manish Asiza	BJP	SP
98	Shikohabad	Firozabad	Mukesh Verma	SP	SP
99	Sirsaganj	Firozabad	Sarvesh Singh Yadav	SP	SP

== Members of Parliament ==
Year	Member	Party
1957	Braj Raj Singh	Independent
1967	Shiv Charan Lal	Samyukta Socialist Party
1971	Chhatrapati Ambesh	Indian National Congress
1977	Ram Ji Lal Suman	Janata Party
1980	Rajesh Kumar Singh	Independent
1984	Ganga Ram	Indian National Congress
1989	Ram Ji Lal Suman	Janata Dal
1991	Prabhu Dayal Katheria	Bharatiya Janata Party
1996	Prabhu Dayal Katheria	Bharatiya Janata Party
1998	Prabhu Dayal Katheria	Bharatiya Janata Party
1999	Ram Ji Lal Suman	Samajwadi Party
2004	Ram Ji Lal Suman	Samajwadi Party
2009	Akhilesh Yadav	Samajwadi Party
2009^	Raj Babbar	Indian National Congress
2014	Akshay Yadav	Samajwadi Party
2019	Chandrasen Jadon	Bharatiya Janata Party
2024	Akshay Yadav	Samajwadi Party

^ by poll

== Election results ==
=== General election 2024 ===
2024 Indian general election: Firozabad
Party	Candidate	Votes	%	±%
SP	Akshay Yadav	543,037	49.04	▲5.63
BJP	Vishwadeep Singh	4,53,725	40.98	▼5.11
BSP	Chowdhary Basheer	90,948	8.21	▲8.21
NOTA	None of the Above	5,279	0.48	▼0.14
Majority		89,312	8.07	▲5.39
Turnout		11,07,296	58.56	▼1.57
SP gain from BJP		Swing		

=== General election 2019 ===
2019 Indian general elections: Firozabad
Party	Candidate	Votes	%	±%
BJP	Dr. Chandra Sen Jadon	495,819	46.09	+8.02
SP	Akshay Yadav	4,67,038	43.41	−4.99
PSP(L)	Shivpal Singh Yadav	91,869	8.54	+8.54
BKPP	Upendra Singh Rajput	9,503	0.88	+0.55
NOTA	None of the Above	6,676	0.62	+0.20
Majority		28,781	2.68	−7.65
Turnout		10,76,574	60.13	−7.36
BJP gain from SP		Swing	-2.31	

=== General elections 2014 ===
2014 Indian general elections: Firozabad
Party	Candidate	Votes	%	±%
SP	Akshay Yadav	5,34,583	48.40	+19.51
BJP	Prof. S. P. Singh Baghel	4,20,524	38.07	+36.89
BSP	Thakur Vishwadeep Singh	1,18,909	10.76	−16.37
INC	Atul Chaturvedi	7,447	0.67	−39.06
BKPP	Upendra Singh	3,696	0.33	+0.33
NOTA	None of the above	4,654	0.42	+0.42
Majority		1,14,059	10.33	−0.51
Turnout		11,04,647	67.49	+12.17
SP gain from INC		Swing	+8.67	

=== Bye Election 2009 ===
Bye-election, 2009: Firozabad
Party	Candidate	Votes	%	±%
INC	Raj Babbar	3,12,728	39.73	+38.80
SP	Dimple Yadav	2,27,385	28.89	−13.02
BSP	Prof. S. P. Singh Baghel	2,13,571	27.13	−4.95
BJP	B. P. Singh Chauhan	9,269	1.18	−13.65
NCP	G. L. Maurya	4,873	0.62	+0.62
Majority		85,343	10.84	+1.01
Turnout		7,87,130	55.33	+7.17
INC gain from SP		Swing		

=== General elections 2009 ===
2009 Indian general elections: Firozabad
Party	Candidate	Votes	%	±%
SP	Akhilesh Yadav	2,87,011	41.91	
BSP	Prof. S. P. Singh Baghel	2,19,710	32.08	
BJP	Raghuvar Dayal Verma	1,01,561	14.83	
Independent	Manish Asija	33,785	4.93	
Independent	Ashok Yadav	9,408	1.37	
Majority		67,301	9.83	
Turnout		6,84,904	48.16	
SP hold		Swing		

=== General elections 2004 ===
General-election, 2004: Firozabad
Party	Candidate	Votes	%	±%
SP	Ram Ji Lal Suman	212,383	40.0	
BJP	Kishori Lal Mahaur	157,595	29.7	
BSP	Biresh Kumar Alias Dadua	69,554	13.1	
RSMD	Prabhudayal Katheria	54,332	10.2	
INC	Dr. Shivnarain Gautam	28,108	5.3	
Majority				
Turnout				
SP gain from BJP		Swing		

=== General elections 1999 ===
General elections 1999: Firozabad
Party	Candidate	Votes	%	±%
SP	Ram Ji Lal Suman	289,459	49.6	▲5.63
BJP	Indal Singh	206,091	35.3	▼5.11
BSP	Chandra Bhan Verma	58,676	10.1	▲8.21
Independent	Ram Prasad	5,323	0.9	▼0.14
Majority		88,930	60	
Turnout		559,549	95	
SP gain from BJP		Swing		

== See also ==
- Firozabad
- Firozabad (Mayoral Constituency)
- List of constituencies of the Lok Sabha
