= Agra Lok Sabha constituency =

Lok Sabha Constituency in Uttar Pradesh, India

Coordinates: 27.18°N 78.01°E

Agra UP-18
- Lok Sabha constituency
- Interactive Map Outlining Agra Lok Sabha constituency

Constituency details
- Country: India
- Region: North India
- State: Uttar Pradesh
- Assembly constituencies: Etmadpur; Agra Cantt. Agra South; Agra North; Jalesar - Awagarh
- Established: 1952-present
- Total electors: 20,72,622
- Reservation: SC

Member of Parliament
- 18th Lok Sabha
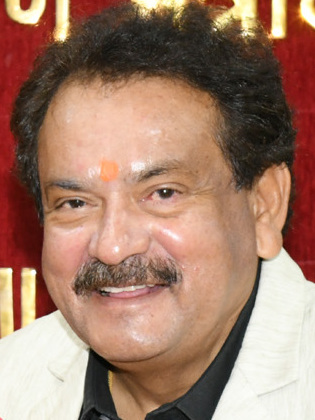
- Incumbent S. P. Singh Baghel
- Party: BJP
- Alliance: NDA
- Elected year: 2024

Agra Lok Sabha constituency (Hindi pronunciation: [aːgɾaː]) is one of the 80 Lok Sabha (parliamentary) constituencies in the Indian state of Uttar Pradesh.

== Assembly segments ==
Presently, Agra Lok Sabha constituency comprises five Vidhan Sabha (legislative assembly) segments.

No	Name	District	Member	Party	2024 Lead
86	Etmadpur	Agra	Dharampal Singh	BJP	BJP
87	Agra Cantt. (SC)	Agra	Girraj Singh Dharmesh	BJP	BJP
88	Agra South	Agra	Yogendra Upadhyaya	BJP	BJP
89	Agra North	Agra	Purshottam Khandelwal	BJP	BJP
106	Jalesar (SC)	Etah	Sanjeev Kumar Diwakar	BJP	BJP

== Members of Parliament ==
Year	Member	Party
1952	Seth Achal Singh	Indian National Congress
1957	Seth Achal Singh	Indian National Congress
1962	Seth Achal Singh	Indian National Congress
1967	Seth Achal Singh	Indian National Congress
1971	Seth Achal Singh	Indian National Congress
1977	Shambhu Nath Chaturvedi	Janata Party
1980	Nihal Singh	Indian National Congress (I)
1984	Nihal Singh	Indian National Congress
1989	Ajay Singh	Janata Dal
1991	Bhagwan Shankar Rawat	Bharatiya Janata Party
1996	Bhagwan Shankar Rawat	Bharatiya Janata Party
1998	Bhagwan Shankar Rawat	Bharatiya Janata Party
1999	Raj Babbar	Samajwadi Party
2004	Raj Babbar	Samajwadi Party
2009	Ram Shankar Katheria	Bharatiya Janata Party
2014	Ram Shankar Katheria	Bharatiya Janata Party
2019	S. P. Singh Baghel	Bharatiya Janata Party
2024	S. P. Singh Baghel	Bharatiya Janata Party

== Election results ==
=== General election 2024 ===
2024 Indian general elections: Agra
Party	Candidate	Votes	%	±%
BJP	S. P. Singh Baghel	599,397	53.34	▼3.14
SP	Suresh Chand Kardam	3,28,103	29.20	▲29.20
BSP	Pooja Amrohi	1,76,474	15.70	▼22.31
NOTA	None of the Above	7,014	0.62	▲0.11
Majority		2,71,294	24.14	▲5.67
Turnout		11,23,779	54.22	▼4.90
BJP hold		Swing		

=== General election 2019 ===
2019 Indian general elections: Agra
Party	Candidate	Votes	%	±%
BJP	S. P. Singh Baghel	646,875	56.48	
BSP	Prof. Manoj Kumar Soni	4,35,329	38.01	
INC	Preeta Harit	45,149	3.94	
NOTA	None of the Above	5,817	0.51	
Majority		2,11,546	18.47	
Turnout		11,45,629	59.12	+0.14
BJP hold		Swing		

=== General election 2014 ===
2014 Indian general elections: Agra
Party	Candidate	Votes	%	±%
BJP	Ram Shankar Katheria	583,716	54.53	+23.05
BSP	Narayan Singh Suman	2,83,453	26.48	−3.50
SP	Maharaj Singh Dhangar	1,34,708	12.58	−9.27
INC	Upendra Singh	34,834	3.25	−11.18
AAP	Ravindra Singh	7,804	0.73	+0.73
NOTA	None of the Above	5,191	0.48	+0.48
Majority		3,00,263	28.05	+26.55
Turnout		10,70,405	58.98	+16.96
BJP hold		Swing	+23.05	

=== General election 2009 ===
Percentage changes are based on numbers from the 2004 elections.

2009 Indian general elections: Agra
Party	Candidate	Votes	%	±%
BJP	Ram Shankar Katheria	203,697	31.48	+2.58
BSP	Kunwar Chand (Vakil)	1,93,982	29.98	+2.88
SP	Ram Ji Lal Suman	1,41,367	21.85	−15.97
INC	Prabhudayal Katheria	93,373	14.43	+12.18
Independent	Santosh Kumar Diwakar	4,571	0.71	
Independent	Ganeshi Lal Mahaur	1,560	0.24	
Independent	Vinod Kumar Singh	1,454	0.22	
Rashtiya Samta Dal	Vivek Chauhan Valmiki	1,236	0.19	−0.16
Independent	Rakesh	1,215	0.19	
Independent	Dr. Chandrapal	1,093	0.17	
Jai Bharat Samanta Party	Ramesh	1,070	0.17	
Majority		9,715	1.50	
Turnout		6,47,090	42.02	
BJP gain from SP		Swing		

=== General election 2004 ===
2004 Indian general elections: Agra
Party	Candidate	Votes	%	±%
SP	Raj Babbar	243,094	37.82	
BJP	Murari Lal Mittal	1,85,752	28.90	
BSP	Keshav Prasad Dixit	1,74,149	27.10	
INC	Surendra Singh	14,483	2.25	
RHD	Sayed Irfan Ahmad	12,346	1.92	
Majority		57,342	8.92	
Turnout		6,42,719	44.92	
SP hold		Swing		

== See also ==
- Agra district
- List of constituencies of the Lok Sabha
- Agra (Graduates constituency)
