= S. P. Singh Baghel =

Indian politician (born 1960)

Satya Pal Singh Baghel
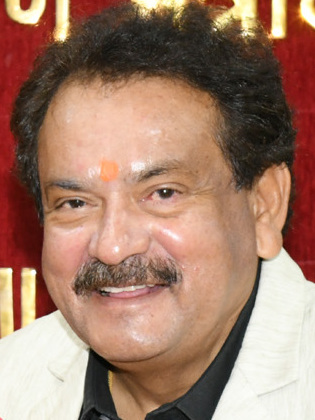

Union Minister of State
- Incumbent
- Assumed office 7 July 2021
- Prime Minister: Narendra Modi
- Ministry & Departments: Fisheries, Animal Husbandary and Dairying (9 June 2024 - present); Panchayati Raj (9 June 2024 - present); Health and Family Welfare (18 May 2023 - 9 June 2024); Law and Justice (7 July 2021 - 18 May 2023)

Member of Parliament, Lok Sabha
- Incumbent
- Assumed office 23 May 2019
- Preceded by: Ram Shankar Katheria
- Constituency: Agra, Uttar Pradesh
- In office 3 March 1998 – 16 May 2009
- Preceded by: Ompal Singh Nidar
- Succeeded by: Constituency abolished
- Constituency: Jalesar, Uttar Pradesh

Member of Parliament, Rajya Sabha
- In office 5 July 2010 – 12 March 2014
- Constituency: Uttar Pradesh

Cabinet Minister in Uttar Pradesh
- In office 19 March 2017 – 23 May 2019
- Chief Minister: Yogi Adityanath
- Ministry & Departments: Livestock; Minor Irrigation; Fisheries

Member of Uttar Pradesh Legislative Assembly
- In office 11 March 2017 – 23 May 2019
- Preceded by: Rakesh Babu
- Succeeded by: Prempal Singh Dhangar
- Constituency: Tundla

Personal details
- Born: 21 June 1960 (age 66) Etawah, Uttar Pradesh, India
- Party: Bharatiya Janata Party (since 2014)
- Other political affiliations: Samajwadi Party (1996–2009); Bahujan Samaj Party (2009–2014)
- Spouse: Madhu Baghel (m. 1989)
- Children: 2 (1 daughter and 1 son)
- Education: Jiwaji University; Meerut College, Chaudhary Charan Singh University; Dr. Bhimrao Ambedkar University
- Website: http://www.spsinghbaghel.com
- As of 16 May 2014

Satya Pal Singh Baghel (born 21 June 1960; Hindi pronunciation: [sət̪jə paːl sɪŋgʱ bəgʱeːl]) is an Indian politician and Member of Parliament (Loksabha). A member of Bharatiya Janata Party, he got elected to 17th Lok Sabha from Agra and again to 18th Lok Sabha from the same constituency. He previously was a member of Samajwadi Party, in which he got elected to Lok Sabha thrice and to Rajya Sabha once as a member of Bahujan Samaj Party.

== Personal life and education ==
Baghel was born in Bhatpura, Umari, Etawah district, Uttar Pradesh in 1960. He was born in Dhangar(gadaria) family. Currently he is member of Lok Sabha from Agra, which is reserved for Scheduled Castes. His father was Rambhrose Singh and his mother was Ram Shree Devi. Baghel married on 30 November 1989 and has two children. Baghel has a bachelor of law degree, a master's degree in science and a doctoral degree. He attended Maharaja Jiwaji Rao University in Gwalior, Madhya Pradesh and the Meerut University in Meerut, Uttar Pradesh.

== Career ==
In 1998, 1999 and 2004, Baghel represented the Samajwadi Party three times in the Lok Sabha from Jalesar, Uttar Pradesh. After these three terms, Baghel was suspended from his party. He then unsuccessfully contested two Lok Sabha elections as a Bahujan Samaj Party (BSP) candidate. In 2010, Baghel was elected to the Rajya Sabha (Council of States) but then in the following election, lost to the Bhartiya Janta Party candidate.

On 3 July 2015, Baghel became president of the BJP OBC Morcha (the "Other Backward Class" wing of the Bharatiya Janata Party).

In 2017, Baghel became a Member of the Legislative Assembly of Uttar Pradesh representing the Bharatiya Janata Party (BJP).
In 2019, he was elected to Lok Sabha from Agra seat on BJP ticket.

1998 – 1999: Member of Parliament from Jalesar (First Term), Samajwadi Party
1999 – 2004: Member of Parliament from Jalesar (Second Term), Samajwadi Party
2004 – 2009: Member of Parliament from Jalesar (Third Term), Samajwadi Party
2010 – 2014: member of Rajya Sabha. Bahujan Samaj Party
2017 – 2019: M.L.A. from Tundla as BJP member
2017 – 2019: Cabinet Minister of Livestock, Minor Irrigation and Fisheries in Government of Uttar Pradesh.
2019–2024: Member of Parliament Lok Sabha from Agra (Fourth Term but first time as BJP member)
7 July 2021 – 18 May 2023: Minister of state for Law and Justice in Union Cabinet Government of India
18 May 2023 – 10 June 2024: Minister of State for Health and Family Welfare in Union Cabinet Government of India
2024–Incumbent: Member of Parliament Lok Sabha from Agra (Fifth Term but Second time as BJP member)

== Public office activities ==
In 1998 and 1999, Baghel was a member of committees on subordinate legislation, human resource development and health and family welfare. In 1999 and 2000, he was a member of committees on food, civil supplies and public distribution and an estimates committee. Between 2000 and 2004, he worked in the Ministry of Home Affairs and on committees of public undertaking, external affairs and member attendance in the House.

== See also ==
- Third Modi ministry
