= Nath Kuteer =

Coordinates: 27°03′32.2″N 78°40′44.1″E

Nath Kutir is a colony in Sirsaganj town, Firozabad district, in the Indian state of Uttar Pradesh. It is located on the way to Bah from Sirsaganj.

The colony got its name from the name Nath Baba

== Nearby ==
- Girdhari Inter College
- M D Jain Inter College
- Indira Memorial Sr. Sec. School

== Demographics ==
As of the 2013 India census, Nath Kuteer had a population of 600 people.
