= Sachin Yadav =

Sachin Yadav may refer to:

- Sachin Yadav (Madhya Pradesh politician)
- Sachin Yadav (Uttar Pradesh politician)
- Sachin Yadav (javelin thrower)
