= Seengemai =

Singemai (Seengemai)
- village
- Location in Uttar Pradesh, India Singemai (Seengemai) (India)
- Coordinates: 27.060°N 78.726°E
- Country: India
- State: Uttar Pradesh
- District: Firozabad

Population (2011)
  - Total: 2,974 (1,606 males 1,368 females)

Hindi
  - Official: Hindi
- Time zone: UTC+5:30 (IST)
- PIN: 205151/283151
- Telephone code: +91-5676

Seengemai is a village under the municipal board of Sirsaganj in the Firozabad district of the Indian state of Uttar Pradesh.

The village has an average elevation of 165 metres (541 ft) and is located approximately 5 kilometres (3.1 mi) from Sirsaganj.

A bypass road for National Highway No.2 passes near the village, which rests on the banks of the river Aab-Ganga, a watercourse that dried up many years ago.

During the past few years, the water supply to the village has been diminishing rapidly and the village is currently suffering from a water shortage.

Other villages near Seengemai include Nagla Nainsukh, Nagla Neewri, Nagla Maharam, Atapur and Kisraon.

== Seengemai Gram Panchayat ==
Seengemai Gram Panchayat (the Gram/ Village Panchayat is the basic unit of local self-government) consists of Seengemai village and the two adjacent villages of Nagla Nainsukh and Nagla Newari. This Gram Panchayat currently reserves its Gram Pradhan (also known as the Sarpanch or Village Chieftain) candidature for people belonging to the Thakur in accordance with the directives laid down by the Constitution of India.

== Transport ==
The nearby town of Sirsaganj serves as a regional center of trade and commerce for the people of Seengemai. Three main roads connect the village to Sirsaganj. These roads are used by trucks, tractors, bullock carts, and other vehicles to transport people, crops, and animals. Since the village has no buses, autos or other public transportation its people rely on tractors, cars, motorcycles, scooters, and bicycles to reach nearby villages and the town.

== People and culture ==
The village of Seengemai is made up of 425 families, accounting for a total population of 2974, of which 1606 are male and 1368 are female. The female to male ratio of the village is 85:100.

The primary religion of the village is Hinduism, with followers of Buddhism and Islam in the minority. Adherents to these three different religions coexist without tension.

Seengemai villagers primarily speak Khariboli Hindi (an informal form of Hindi). English is also spoken by the educated village population.

The majority of the village is engaged in agriculture, while others are civil servants or businessmen.

== Ram Nawami Mela ==
Ram Nawami Mela is an annual, traditional, and spiritual feast that is celebrated in Seengemai. The Mela is a vital part of the culture of Seengemai. This feast is celebrated on the occasion of Ram Nawami, generally in the month of April each year. This feast lasts as long as two days. The permanent venue of the Mela is a temple of the avatar of the goddess named Durga.

Vendors from nearby towns and villages come to the Mela to sell goods such as snacks, sweets and jhulas, which is the main attraction for viewers of the feast. During the night there is a show of Nautanki, a traditional entertaining art. Sometimes vulgarity and violence are reported in some of these shows.

A large reduction in viewers of the Mela has been reported in the last few years.

== Education ==
Seengemai village has two government-funded schools, one for primary and the other imparting secondary school education. In addition to this, there are a few private schools as well. For higher education, students of Seengemai depend on the nearby municipality of Sirsaganj. The trend of the students, however, have been to follow traditional farming than to attend classes.

== Infrastructure ==
Seengemai remains under-developed when it comes to public infrastructure. The semi-developed streets that can be found are tiled with clay bricks. Likewise, the public electrification and sewage system are either absent or grossly mismanaged raising health and security concerns. However, one can witness a few government-funded buildings like a local hospital and two schools as well as private buildings in the village.
