= Jalesar Assembly constituency =

Constituency of the Uttar Pradesh legislative assembly in India

Jalesar, Awagarh
- Constituency No. 106 for the Uttar Pradesh Legislative Assembly

Constituency details
- Country: India
- Region: North India
- State: Uttar Pradesh
- District: Etah
- Lok Sabha constituency: Agra
- Established: 1956
- Total electors: 2,91,979 (2019)
- Reservation: SC

Member of Legislative Assembly
- 18th Uttar Pradesh Legislative Assembly
- Incumbent Sanjeev Kumar Diwakar
- Party: Bharatiya Janata Party

Jalesar is one of the 403 constituencies of the Uttar Pradesh Legislative Assembly, India. It is a part of the Etah district and one of the five assembly constituencies in the Agra Lok Sabha constituency. First election in this assembly constituency was held in 1957 after the "DPACO (1956)" (delimitation order) was passed in 1956. After the "Delimitation of Parliamentary and Assembly Constituencies Order" was passed in 2008, the constituency was assigned identification number 106.

== Wards / Areas ==
Extent of Jalesar and Awagarh as Jalesar and Awagarh assembly constituency is Awagarh Tehsil; PCs Gaharana, Bhopatpur, Jhinvar, Rustamgarh, Dhaniga, Babsa, Nagla Khilli, Basundhara, Kheda, Majharau of Nidholikalan KC & Nidholikalan NP of Etah Tehsil.

== Members of the Legislative Assembly ==
#	Term	Name	Party	From	To	Days	Comments	Ref
01	01st Vidhan Sabha	-	-	Mar-1952	Mar-1957	1,849	Constituency not in existence	
02	02nd Vidhan Sabha	Chiranji Lal	Indian National Congress	Apr-1957	Mar-1962	1,800	-	
03	03rd Vidhan Sabha	Chiranji Lal	Swatantra Party	Mar-1962	Mar-1967	1,828	-	
04	04th Vidhan Sabha	U. B. Singh	Indian National Congress	Mar-1967	Apr-1968	402	-	
05	05th Vidhan Sabha	Chiranji Lal	Bharatiya Kranti Dal	Feb-1969	Mar-1974	1,832	-	
06	06th Vidhan Sabha	Nathu Ram	Indian National Congress	Mar-1974	Apr-1977	1,153	-	
07	07th Vidhan Sabha	Madhav	Janata Party	Jun-1977	Feb-1980	969	-	
08	08th Vidhan Sabha	Ram Singh	Indian National Congress (I)	Jun-1980	Mar-1985	1,735	-	
09	09th Vidhan Sabha	Prem Pal Singh	Indian National Congress	Mar-1985	Nov-1989	1,725	-	
10	10th Vidhan Sabha	Madhav	Bharatiya Janata Party	Dec-1989	Apr-1991	488	-	
11	11th Vidhan Sabha	Madhav	Bharatiya Janata Party	Jun-1991	Dec-1992	533	-	
12	12th Vidhan Sabha	Raghuveer Singh	Samajwadi Party	Dec-1993	Oct-1995	693	-	
13	13th Vidhan Sabha	Mithlesh Kumari	Bharatiya Janata Party	Oct-1996	May-2002	1,967	-	
14	14th Vidhan Sabha	Anar Singh Diwakar	Samajwadi Party	Feb-2002	May-2007	1,902	-	
15	15th Vidhan Sabha	Kuver Singh	Bharatiya Janata Party	May-2007	Mar-2012	1,762	-	
16	16th Vidhan Sabha	Ranjeet Suman	Samajwadi Party	Mar-2012	Mar-2017	-	-	
17	17th Vidhan Sabha	Sanjeev Kumar Diwakar	Bharatiya Janata Party	Mar-2017	Mar-2022			
18	18th Vidhan Sabha	Sanjeev Kumar Diwakar	Bharatiya Janata Party	Mar-2022	Incumbent			

== Election results ==
=== 2027 ===
2027 Uttar Pradesh Legislative Assembly election: Jalesad
Party	Candidate	Votes	%	±%
INDIA				
NDA				
BSP				
NOTA	None of the above			
Majority				
Turnout				
gain from		Swing		

=== 2022 ===
2022 Uttar Pradesh Legislative Assembly Election: Jalesar
Party	Candidate	Votes	%	±%
BJP	Sanjeev Kumar Diwakar	91,339	45.1	+0.96
SP	Ranjeet Suman	86,898	42.91	+9.5
BSP	Akash Singh	19,364	9.56	−9.84
NOTA	None of the above	619	0.31	−0.34
Majority		4,441	2.19	−8.54
Turnout		202,531	68.09	+2.25
BJP hold		Swing		

=== 2017 ===
2017 Uttar Pradesh Legislative Assembly Election: Jalesar
Party	Candidate	Votes	%	±%
BJP	Sanjeev Kumar Diwakar	81,502	44.14	
SP	Ranjeet Suman	61,694	33.41	
BSP	Mohan Singh	35,817	19.4	
RTKP	Rajkumari	2,375	1.29	
NOTA	None of the above	1,188	0.65	
Majority		19,808	10.73	
Turnout		184,640	65.84	

=== 2012 ===
2012 General Elections: Jalesar
Party	Candidate	Votes	%	±%
SP	Ranjeet Suman	55,391	36.97	−
BSP	Omprakash Dalit	32,822	21.91	−
INC	Anar Singh Diwakar	20,834	13.91	−
	Remainder 9 candidates	40,762	27.21	−
Majority		22,569	15.07	−
Turnout		149,809	58.93	−
SP gain from BJP		Swing		

== See also ==
- Agra Lok Sabha constituency
- Etah district
- Sixteenth Legislative Assembly of Uttar Pradesh
- Uttar Pradesh Legislative Assembly
- Vidhan Bhawan
