= Shikohabad Assembly constituency =

Constituency of the Uttar Pradesh legislative assembly in India

Shikohabad
- Constituency No. 98 for the Uttar Pradesh Legislative Assembly

Constituency details
- Country: India
- Region: North India
- State: Uttar Pradesh
- District: Firozabad
- Total electors: 358,626 (2022)
- Reservation: None

Member of Legislative Assembly
- 18th Uttar Pradesh Legislative Assembly
- Incumbent Mukesh Verma
- Party: Samajwadi Party
- Elected year: 2022

Shikohabad Assembly constituency is one of the 403 constituencies of the Uttar Pradesh Legislative Assembly, India. It is a part of the Firozabad district and one of the five assembly constituencies in the Firozabad Lok Sabha constituency.

First election in this assembly constituency was held in 1952 after the "DPACO (1951)" (delimitation order) was passed in 1951. After the "Delimitation of Parliamentary and Assembly Constituencies Order" was passed in 2008, the constituency was assigned identification number 98.

== Wards / Areas ==
Extent of Shikohabad Assembly constituency is KCs Firozabad & Matsaina of Firozabad Tehsil; PCs Makkhanpur, Mohanipur, Mohammadpur Labbhoua, Dakhinara, Aasdevmai Nurpur, Dikhtoli, Shikohabad, Aronj, Nawali, Sadhupur, Mohammadpur Ahir, Armrajat, Rasulpur, Harganpur, Hariya, Abbaspur, Amri of Shikohabad KC & MB Shikohabad of Shikohabad Tehsil.

== Members of the Legislative Assembly ==
Year	Member	Party
1952	Chaudhary Maharaj Singh	Indian National Congress
1957	Ch.Layaq Singh	Independent
1962	Mansa Ram Singh Yadav	Independent
1967	Ram Swarup Yadav	Indian National Congress
1969	Mansa Ram	Bharatiya Kranti Dal
1974	Virendra Swaroop	Bharatiya Kranti Dal
1977	Ganga Sahai Yadav	Janata Party
1980	Jagdish Singh	Indian National Congress (I)
1985	Ram Naresh	Independent
1989	Rakesh Kumar	Independent
1991	Jhaulal Yadav	Independent
1993	Mulayam Singh Yadav	Samajwadi Party
1996	Ashok Yadav	Bharatiya Janata Party
2002	Hariom Yadav	Samajwadi Party
2007	Ashok Yadav	Independent
2012	Om Prakash Verma	Samajwadi Party
2017	Mukesh Verma	Bhartiya Janata Party
2022	Mukesh Verma	Samajwadi Party

== Election results ==
=== 2027 ===
2027 Uttar Pradesh Legislative Assembly election: Shikohabad
Party	Candidate	Votes	%	±%
INDIA				
NDA				
BSP				
NOTA	None of the above			
Majority				
Turnout				
gain from		Swing		

=== 2022 ===
2022 Uttar Pradesh Legislative Assembly election: Shikohabad
Party	Candidate	Votes	%	±%
SP	Mukesh Verma	106,279	45.14	+9.25
BJP	Om Prakash Verma	96,951	41.18	+0.27
BSP	Anil Kumar	25,445	10.81	−6.66
AIMIM	Prity Mishra	2,630	1.12	
NOTA	None of the above	1,181	0.5	−0.3
Majority		9,328	3.96	−1.06
Turnout		235,438	65.81	−0.29
SP gain from BJP		Swing		

=== 2017 ===
2017 Uttar Pradesh Legislative Assembly Election: Shikohabad
Party	Candidate	Votes	%	±%
BJP	Mukesh Verma	87,851	40.91	
SP	Sanjay Kumar	77,074	35.89	
BSP	Shailesh Kumar	37,512	17.47	
Independent	Ram Prakash Yadav	8,074	3.76	
NOTA	None of the above	1,700	0.8	
Majority		10,777	5.02	
Turnout		214,721	66.1	

== See also ==
- Firozabad district
- Firozabad Lok Sabha constituency
- Sixteenth Legislative Assembly of Uttar Pradesh
- Uttar Pradesh Legislative Assembly
- Vidhan Bhawan
