= Ramji Lal Suman =

Indian politician

Ram Ji Lal Suman

Member of Parliament, Rajya Sabha
- Incumbent
- Assumed office 3 April 2024
- Constituency: Uttar Pradesh

Member of Parliament, Lok Sabha
- In office 1999-2009
- Preceded by: Prabhu Dayal Katheria
- Succeeded by: Akhilesh Yadav
- Constituency: Firozabad

Cabinet Minister, Government of India
- In office 1990-1991

National General Secretary, Samajwadi Party
- In office Present

Personal details
- Born: 25 July 1950 (age 76) Hathras, Uttar Pradesh, India
- Party: SP
- Spouse: Rem Lata Suman
- Children: 1 son and 3 daughters
- Education: Agra College, Agra University
- As of 21 September, 2006

Ram Ji Lal Suman (born 25 July 1950) is an Indian politician and current member of parliament in Rajya Sabha from Uttar Pradesh. He is former MP from Firozabad in Uttar Pradesh. He is Samajwadi Party politician.
