= Tundla Assembly constituency =

Constituency of the Uttar Pradesh legislative assembly in India

Tundla
- Constituency No. 95 for the Uttar Pradesh Legislative Assembly

Constituency details
- Country: India
- Region: North India
- State: Uttar Pradesh
- District: Firozabad
- Established: 1967
- Total electors: 3,26,192 (2012)
- Reservation: SC

Member of Legislative Assembly
- 18th Uttar Pradesh Legislative Assembly
- Incumbent Prempal Singh Dhangar
- Elected year: 2022

Tundla is one of the 403 constituencies of the Uttar Pradesh Legislative Assembly, India. It is a part of the Firozabad district and one of the five assembly constituencies in the Firozabad Lok Sabha constituency. First election in this assembly constituency was held in 1974 after the delimitation order was passed in 1967. After the "Delimitation of Parliamentary and Assembly Constituencies Order" was passed in 2008, the constituency was assigned identification number 95. The constituency is revered for candidates from SC community.

== Wards / Areas ==
Extent of Tundla Assembly constituency is Tundla Tehsil; KCs Narkhi, Nagla Beech (V) & Pachukhra of Firozabad Tehsil.

== Members of the Legislative Assembly ==
Year	Member	Party
1967	Multan Singh	Samyukta Socialist Party
1969	Multan Singh	Bharatiya Kranti Dal
1974	Ramji Lal Kain	Indian National Congress
1977	Rajesh Kumar Singh	Janata Party
1980	Gulab Sehra	Indian National Congress (I)
1985	Ashok Sehra	Indian National Congress
1989	Om Prakash Diwakar	Janata Dal
1991	Om Prakash Diwakar	Janata Dal
1993	Ramesh Chandra Chanchal	Samajwadi Party
1996	Shiv Singh Chak	Bharatiya Janata Party
2002	Mohan Dev Shankhvar	Samajwadi Party
2007	Rakesh Babu	Bahujan Samaj Party
2012	Rakesh Babu	Bahujan Samaj Party
2017	S. P. Singh Baghel	Bharatiya Janata Party
2020^	Prempal Singh Dhangar	Bharatiya Janata Party
2022	Prempal Singh Dhangar	Bharatiya Janata Party

== Election results ==
=== 2027 ===
2027 Uttar Pradesh Legislative Assembly election: Tundla
Party	Candidate	Votes	%	±%
INDIA				
NDA				
BSP				
NOTA	None of the above			
Majority				
Turnout				
gain from		Swing		

=== 2022 ===
2022 Uttar Pradesh Legislative Assembly election: Tundla
Party	Candidate	Votes	%	±%
BJP	Prempal Singh Dhangar	122,881	49.46	▲0.78
SP	Rakesh Babu	75,190	30.26	▲7.73
BSP	Amar Singh	40,977	16.49	▼9.17
NOTA	None of the above	1,110	0.45	▼0.12
Majority		47,691	19.2	▼3.82
Turnout		248,451	66.65	▼3.01

=== 2020 ===
By Election, 2020: Tundla
Party	Candidate	Votes	%	±%
BJP	Prempal Singh Dhangar	72,950	40.24	
SP	Maharaj Singh Dhangar	55,267	30.49	
BSP	Sanjeev Kumar Chak	41,010	22.62	
JAP	Ashok Kumar	4,953	2.73	
Majority		17,683		
Turnout		1,81,328	50.20	
BJP hold		Swing		

=== 2017 ===
2017 Uttar Pradesh Legislative Assembly Election: Tundla
Party	Candidate	Votes	%	±%
BJP	S.P. Singh Baghel	118,584	48.68	
BSP	Rakesh Babu	62,514	25.66	
SP	Shiv Singh Chak	54,888	22.53	
RLD	Ganga Pushkar	2,576	1.06	
NOTA	None of the above	1,381	0.57	
Majority		56,070	23.02	
Turnout		243,591	69.66	

=== 2012 ===
2012 General Elections: Tundla
Party	Candidate	Votes	%	±%
BSP	Rakesh Babu	67,949	32.79	−
SP	Akhilesh Kumar	60,003	28.96	−
BJP	Shiv Singh Chak	58,536	28.25	−
	Remainder 13 candidates	20,725	10	−
Majority		7,946	3.83	−
Turnout		207,213	63.52	−
BSP hold		Swing		

== See also ==
- Firozabad district
- Firozabad Lok Sabha constituency
- Sixteenth Legislative Assembly of Uttar Pradesh
- Uttar Pradesh Legislative Assembly
- Vidhan Bhawan
