= Shiv Singh Chak =

Indian politician

MLA, 13th Legislative Assembly
- In office 1996–2002
- Constituency: Tundla (SC)

Personal details
- Born: Shiv Singh Chak; 1 January 1964 (age 62) Tundla district
- Party: Bhartiya Janata Party
- Parent: Sh. Nathilal Chak (father)
- Education: 12th
- Occupation: Politician
- Profession: Politician

Shiv Singh Chak is an Indian politician and a member of the 13th Legislative Assembly of India. He represents the Tundla constituency of Uttar Pradesh and is a member of the Bhartiya Janata Party political party.

== Early life and education ==
Shiv Singh Chak was born in Tundla district. He is educated till 12th.

== Political career ==
Shiv Singh Chak has been a MLA for one term. He represented the Tundla constituency and is a member of the Bhartiya Janata Party political party.
