= Chandrasen Jadon =

Indian politician

Member of Parliament, Lok Sabha
- In office 23 May 2019 – 4 June 2024
- Preceded by: Akshay Yadav
- Succeeded by: Akshay Yadav
- Constituency: Firozabad

Personal details
- Born: 6 July 1950 (age 75)
- Party: Bharatiya Janata Party
- Spouse: Mithilesh Kumari (m. 1975)
- Children: 2

Chandrasen Jadon is an Indian politician and is Former Member of Parliament from Firozabad parliamentary constituency of Uttar Pradesh. Chandrasen Jadon is from Sirsaganj town in Firozabad born in Jadaun Rajput family.
