= Firozabad Assembly constituency =

Constituency of the Uttar Pradesh legislative assembly in India

Firozabad
- Constituency No. 97 for the Uttar Pradesh Legislative Assembly

Constituency details
- Country: India
- Region: North India
- State: Uttar Pradesh
- District: Firozabad
- Established: 1956
- Total electors: 379,172 (2017)
- Reservation: None

Member of Legislative Assembly
- 18th Uttar Pradesh Legislative Assembly
- Incumbent Manish Asiza
- Party: Bharatiya Janata Party

Firozabad Assembly constituency (Hindustani pronunciation: [fɪɾoːzaːbaːd̪]) is one of the 403 constituencies of the Uttar Pradesh Legislative Assembly, India. It is a part of the Firozabad district and one of the five assembly constituencies in the Firozabad Lok Sabha constituency. First election in this assembly constituency was held in 1957 after the "DPACO (1956)" (delimitation order) was passed in 1956. After the "Delimitation of Parliamentary and Assembly Constituencies Order" was passed in 2008, the constituency was assigned identification number 97.

== Wards / Areas ==
Extent of Firozabad Assembly constituency is Firozabad MB, Humayunpur (OG), Nagla Bhau (OG), Mirza Nagla (OG), Ambedkar Park (OG), Ramgarh Nagla Kothi (OG), Asafabad (OG), Kakarahu (OG), Lalpur (OG) & Sukhmalpur Nizamabad (CT) of Firozabad Tehsil.

== Members of the Legislative Assembly ==
Year	Member	Party
1957	Jagannath Lahri	Independent
1962	Bhagwan Das	Republican Party of India
1967	Raja Ram	Independent
1969	Raja Ram	Independent
1974	Mohammad Ayyub	Indian Union Muslim League
1977	Raghubar Dayal Verma	Janata Party
1980	Ghulam Nabi	Indian National Congress (I)
1985	Raghubar Dayal Verma	Janata Party
1989	Raghubar Dayal Verma	Janata Dal
1991	Ram Kishan Dadaju	Bharatiya Janata Party
1993	Nasiruddin Siddiqui	Samajwadi Party
1996	Raghubar Dayal Verma	Samata Party
2002	Azim Khan	Samajwadi Party
2007	Nasiruddin Siddiqui	Bahujan Samaj Party
2012	Manish Asija	Bharatiya Janata Party
2017	Manish Asija	Bharatiya Janata Party
2022	Manish Asija	Bharatiya Janata Party

== Election results ==
=== 2027 ===
2027 Uttar Pradesh Legislative Assembly election: Firozabad
Party	Candidate	Votes	%	±%
INDIA				
NDA				
BSP				
NOTA	None of the above			
Majority				
Turnout				
gain from		Swing		

=== 2022 ===
2022 Uttar Pradesh Legislative Assembly election: Firozabad
Party	Candidate	Votes	%	±%
BJP	Manish Asija	112,509	43.43	▼0.76
SP	Saifur Rahman	79,554	30.71	▲4.48
BSP	Shazia Azim	37,643	14.53	▼7.59
AIMIM	Bablu Singh	18,898	7.3	▲2.36
Independent	Ramdas Manav	6,219	2.4	
NOTA	None of the above	1,204	0.46	▲0.07
Majority		32,955	12.72	▼5.24
Turnout		259,033	58.91	▼2.35
BJP hold		Swing		

=== 2017 ===
U. P. Legislative Assembly Election, 2017: Firozabad
Party	Candidate	Votes	%	±%
BJP	Manish Asija	102,654	44.19	
SP	Azim Khan	60,927	26.23	
BSP	Khalid Siddiqui	51,387	22.12	
AIMIM	Ahtsham Ali	11,478	4.94	
NOTA	None of the above	906	0.39	
Majority		41,727	17.96	
Turnout		232,278	61.26	
BJP hold		Swing		

=== 2012 ===
U. P. Legislative Assembly Election, 2012: Firozabad
Party	Candidate	Votes	%	±%
BJP	Manish Asija	74,878	33.67	
SP	Azim Khan	72,863	32.76	
BSP	Khalid Siddiqui	51,790	23.29	
RSMD	Badan Singh	11,651	5.24	
INC	Aazd Ahmed	2,933	1.32	
Majority		2,015	0.91	
Turnout		222,412	62.88	
BJP gain from BSP		Swing		

== See also ==
- Firozabad district
- Firozabad Lok Sabha constituency
- Sixteenth Legislative Assembly of Uttar Pradesh
- Uttar Pradesh Legislative Assembly
- Vidhan Bhawan
