= Jasrana Assembly constituency =

Constituency of the Uttar Pradesh legislative assembly in India

Jasrana
- Constituency No. 96 for the Uttar Pradesh Legislative Assembly

Constituency details
- Country: India
- Region: North India
- State: Uttar Pradesh
- District: Firozabad
- Total electors: 305,791 (2012)
- Reservation: None

Member of Legislative Assembly
- 18th Uttar Pradesh Legislative Assembly
- Incumbent Sachin Yadav
- Party: Samajwadi Party
- Elected year: 2022

Jasrana Assembly constituency is one of the 403 constituencies of the Uttar Pradesh Legislative Assembly, India. It is a part of the Firozabad district and one of the five assembly constituencies in the Firozabad Lok Sabha constituency. First election in this assembly constituency was held in 1952 after the "DPACO (1951)" (delimitation order) was passed in 1951. After the "Delimitation of Parliamentary and Assembly Constituencies Order " was passed in 2008, the constituency was assigned identification number 96.

== Wards / Areas ==
Extent of Jasrana Assembly constituency is Jasrana Tehsil.

== Members of the Legislative Assembly ==
Year	Member	Party
1952	Vishnu Dayal Verma	Independent
1957	Ram Swarup	Indian National Congress
1962	Balbir Singh	Swatantra Party
1967	Raghunath Singh Verma	Indian National Congress
1969	Raghunath Singh Verma	Indian National Congress
1974	Balbir Singh	Bharatiya Kranti Dal
1977	Balbir Singh	Janata Party
1980	Vishnu Dayal Verma	Indian National Congress (I)
1985	Balbir Singh	Lokdal
1989	Raghunath Singh Verma	Indian National Congress
1991	Jaidan Singh	Janata Dal
1993	Ramveer Singh	Samajwadi Party
1996	Ramveer Singh	Samajwadi Party
2002	Ramveer Singh	Samajwadi Party
2007	Ram Prakash Yadav	Independent
2012	Ramveer Singh	Samajwadi Party
2017	Ram Gopal Lodhi	Bharatiya Janata Party
2022	Sachin Yadav	Samajwadi Party

== Election results ==
=== 2027 ===
2027 Uttar Pradesh Legislative Assembly election: Jasrana
Party	Candidate	Votes	%	±%
INDIA				
NDA				
BSP				
NOTA	None of the above			
Majority				
Turnout				
gain from		Swing		

=== 2022 ===
2022 Uttar Pradesh Legislative Assembly election: Jasrana
Party	Candidate	Votes	%	±%
SP	Sachin Yadav	108,289	43.71	▲7.64
BJP	Manvendra Pratap Singh	107,453	43.37	▼1.52
BSP	Surya Pratap Singh	16,955	6.84	▼4.56
Independent	Shiv Pratap Singh	7,765	3.13	
Jan Adhikar Party	Suneel Kumar Jha	2,451	0.99	
NOTA	None of the above	1,580	0.64	▼0.2
Majority		836	0.34	▼8.48
Turnout		247,762	67.46	▼0.21
SP gain from BJP		Swing		

=== 2017 ===
2017 Uttar Pradesh Legislative Assembly Election: Jasrana
Party	Candidate	Votes	%	±%
BJP	Ram Gopal Lodhi	103,426	44.89	
SP	Shivpratap Singh	83,098	36.07	
BSP	Shivraj Singh Yadav	26,274	11.4	
LKD	Ramveer Singh	11,274	4.89	
NOTA	None of the above	1,908	0.84	
Majority		20,328	8.82	
Turnout		230,392	67.67	

=== 2012 ===
2012 General Elections: Jasrana
Party	Candidate	Votes	%	±%
SP	Ramveer Singh	104,440	51.31	−
BSP	Ram Gopal Lodhi	75,804	37.24	−
BJP	Anita Devi	4,200	2.06	−
	Remainder 10 candidates	19,099	9.37	−
Majority		28,636	14.07	−
Turnout		203,543	66.56	−
SP gain from Independent		Swing		

== See also ==
- Firozabad district
- Firozabad Lok Sabha constituency
- Sixteenth Legislative Assembly of Uttar Pradesh
- Uttar Pradesh Legislative Assembly
- Vidhan Bhawan
