= Akshay Yadav =

Indian politician based in Uttar Pradesh

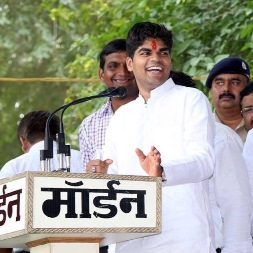
- Yadav in 2019

Member of Parliament, Lok Sabha
- Incumbent
- Assumed office 4 June 2024
- Preceded by: Chandrasen Jadon
- Constituency: Firozabad, Uttar Pradesh
- In office 16 May 2014 – 23 May 2019
- Preceded by: Raj Babbar
- Succeeded by: Chandrasen Jadon
- Constituency: Firozabad, Uttar Pradesh

Personal details
- Born: 25 October 1986 (age 40) Etawah, Uttar Pradesh, India
- Party: Samajwadi Party
- Spouse: Dr. Richa Yadav (m. 2010)
- Relations: Mulayam Singh Yadav (uncle); Shivpal Singh Yadav (uncle); Akhilesh Yadav (cousin); Dharmendra Yadav (cousin)
- Children: 2 (1 son and 1 daughter)
- Parent: Ram Gopal Yadav (father)
- Education: Amity University, Noida; Deep Memorial Public School, Ghaziabad
- Profession: Politician
- Website: www.samajwadiparty.in

Akshay Yadav (born 25 October 1986; Hindi pronunciation: [əkʃəj jaːd̪əʋ]) is an Indian politician belonging to Samajwadi Party in Uttar Pradesh. He is currently member of the Parliament from Firozabad and had won with a margin of 1,14,000 votes in 2024 Indian general election.

== Early life ==
Akshay Yadav was born in Etawah, Uttar Pradesh, India, on 25 October 1986 to Ram Gopal Yadav and Phoolan Devi. His mother Phoolan died in August 2010.

He had 1 sister and 2 brothers. His brother Asit Yadav (Billu Yadav) died in a road accident in 1999.

Akshay was educated at Amity University, Noida and Deep Memorial Public School, Ghaziabad.

== Personal life ==
Akshay Yadav is married to Dr. Richa Yadav since 10 February 2010 and the couple has a son and a daughter.

== Positions held ==
Akshay Yadav is currently serving as 2nd term Lok Sabha MP.

#	From	To	Positions	Party
1.	2014	2019	MP (1st term) in 16th Lok Sabha from Firozabad	SP
2.	2024	Present	MP (2nd term) in 18th Lok Sabha from Firozabad	SP
