= Agra-Etawah Cycle Highway =

Cycle track in Uttar Pradesh, India

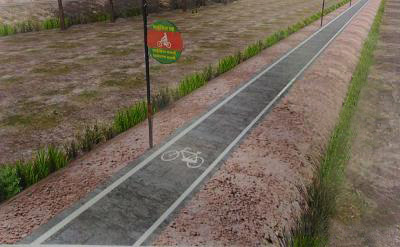
- Length: 207 km (129 mi)
- Trailheads: West: Agra; East: Etawah

Agra-Etawah Cycle Highway is a 207 kilometre long cycle track which starts from Agra and Etawah in Uttar Pradesh, India. This is Asia's first Cycle Highway.

The track begins from the Etawah Wildlife Safari Park in Etawah. On its way to Agra are tourist destinations such as Naugava ka Quila, Raja Bhoj ki Haveli, and Bateshwarnath Temple. It ends at the eastern gate of the Taj Mahal in Agra.

By mid-2018, only a year after the cycleway opened, it was reported that signs were being removed and cycleway was being by local residents for other purposes such as parking.
