= Ramveer Singh =

Indian politician

Ramveer Singh Yadav रामवीर सिंह यादव

MLA, 16th Legislative Assembly
- In office Mar 2012 – Mar 2017
- Preceded by: Ram Prakash Yadav
- Constituency: Jasrana

MLA, 14th Legislative Assembly
- In office Feb 2002 – May 2007
- Preceded by: Himself
- Succeeded by: Ram Prakash Yadav
- Constituency: Jasrana

MLA, 13th Legislative Assembly
- In office Oct 1996 – Mar 2002
- Preceded by: Himself
- Succeeded by: Himself
- Constituency: Jasrana

MLA, 12th Legislative Assembly
- In office Dec 1993 – Oct 1995
- Preceded by: Jaidan Singh
- Succeeded by: Himself
- Constituency: Jasrana

Personal details
- Born: 1 November 1956 (age 69) Firozabad district
- Party: Samajwadi Party (1993–2017); Rashtriya Lok Dal (2017-present)
- Spouse: Meera Yadav (wife)
- Children: 2 sons
- Parent: Hardayal Singh Yadav (father)
- Education: Jawahar Lal Nehru (P.G.) College
- Profession: Farmer, businessman & politician

Ramveer Singh (Hindi: रामवीर सिंह) is an Indian politician and a member of the Sixteenth Legislative Assembly of Uttar Pradesh in India. He represents the Jasrana constituency of Firozabad district in Uttar Pradesh and is a member of the Samajwadi Party political party.

== Early life and education ==
Ramveer Singh was born in Firozabad district. He attended the Jawahar Lal Nehru (P.G.) College and attained Master of Arts degree.

== Political career ==
Ramveer Singh has been a MLA for four terms. He represented the Jasrana constituency and is a member of the Samajwadi Party political party, he was betrayed by the Samajwadi Party and then he contested the 2017 legislative election independently. He joined Samajwadi party again in 2022.

== Posts held ==
#	From	To	Position	Comments
01	2012	2017	Member, 16th Legislative Assembly	
02	2002	2007	Member, 14th Legislative Assembly	
03	1996	2002	Member, 13th Legislative Assembly	
04	1993	1995	Member, 12th Legislative Assembly	

== See also ==
- Jasrana (Assembly constituency)
- Sixteenth Legislative Assembly of Uttar Pradesh
- Uttar Pradesh Legislative Assembly
