= Sirsaganj Assembly constituency =

Constituency of the Uttar Pradesh legislative assembly in India

Sirsaganj
- Constituency No. 99 for the Uttar Pradesh Legislative Assembly

Constituency details
- Country: India
- Region: North India
- State: Uttar Pradesh
- District: Firozabad
- Total electors: 3,10,727(2026)
- Reservation: None

Member of Legislative Assembly
- 18th Uttar Pradesh Legislative Assembly
- Incumbent Sarvesh Singh Yadav
- Party: Samajwadi Party
- Elected year: 2022

Sirsaganj Assembly constituency is one of the 403 constituencies of the Uttar Pradesh Legislative Assembly, India. It is a part of the Firozabad district and one of the five assembly constituencies in the Firozabad Lok Sabha constituency. First election in this assembly constituency was held in 2012 after the "Delimitation of Parliamentary and Assembly Constituencies Order, 2008" was passed and the constituency was formed in 2008. The constituency is assigned identification number 99. The constituency has major population of Ahirs and Kshatriya communities with significant population of other communities also.

== Wards / Areas ==
Extent of Sirsaganj Assembly constituency is KCs Sirsaganj, Madanpur, Ukhrend, PCs Bramhadabad Lachhpur, Rudhau, Urawar Hastarf, Dohiya, Shrichandra Nagar, Late. Shri Surendra Singh Nagar, Dadiyamai New Nagla Gulal of Shikohabad KC & Sirsaganj MB of Shikohabad Tehsil.

== Member of the Legislative Assembly ==
Year	Member	Party
Till 2012 : Constituency did not exist
2012	Hariom Yadav	Samajwadi Party
2017	Hariom Yadav	Samajwadi Party
2022	Sarvesh Singh Yadav	Samajwadi Party

== Election results ==
=== 2027 ===
2027 Uttar Pradesh Legislative Assembly election: Sirsaganj
Party	Candidate	Votes	%	±%
INDIA				
NDA				
BSP				
NOTA	None of the above			
Majority				
Turnout				
gain from		Swing		

=== 2022 ===
2022 Uttar Pradesh Legislative Assembly election: Sirsaganj
Party	Candidate	Votes	%	±%
SP	Sarvesh Singh Yadav	96,224	46.22	+1.76
BJP	Hariom Yadav	87,419	41.99	+2.79
BSP	Pankaj Mishra	18,757	9.01	−1.29
NOTA	None of the above	989	0.48	−0.29
Majority		8,805	4.23	−1.03
Turnout		208,192	64.8	−1.58
SP hold		Swing		

=== 2017 ===
2017 Uttar Pradesh Legislative Assembly Election: Sirsaganj
Party	Candidate	Votes	%	±%
SP	Hariom Yadav	90,281	44.46	
BJP	Jaiveer Singh	79,605	39.2	
BSP	Raghvendra Singh	20,920	10.3	
Jan Adhikar Manch	Pankaj Mishra	6,176	3.04	
Independent	Ashok Yadav	2,184	1.08	
NOTA	None of the above	1,552	0.77	
Majority		10,676	5.26	
Turnout		203,075	66.38	

=== 2012 ===
16th Vidhan Sabha: 2012 Elections

2012 General Elections: Sirsaganj
Party	Candidate	Votes	%	±%
SP	Hariom Yadav	85,517	46.01	−
BSP	Atul Pratap Singh	45,502	24.48	−
Independent	Pankaj Mishra	31,869	17.15	−
	Remainder 20 candidates	22,975	12.38	−
Majority		40,015	21.53	−
Turnout		185,863	64.49	−
SP hold		Swing		

== See also ==
- Firozabad district
- Firozabad Lok Sabha constituency
- Sixteenth Legislative Assembly of Uttar Pradesh
- Uttar Pradesh Legislative Assembly
- Vidhan Bhawan
