= Om Prakash Verma (politician) =

Indian politician

Om Prakash Verma ओम प्रकाश वर्मा

MLA, 16th Legislative Assembly
- In office March 2012 – March 2017
- Preceded by: Ashok Yadav
- Succeeded by: Dr. Mukesh Verma
- Constituency: Shikohabad

Personal details
- Born: 16 November 1959 (age 66) New Delhi
- Party: Bharatiya Janata Party
- Other political affiliations: Samajwadi Party
- Spouse: Nupur Verma (wife)
- Children: one daughter
- Parent: Shri Shivram Singh (father)
- Education: Ramjas college
- Occupation: Banking
- Profession: Banker & politician

Om Prakash Verma (Hindi: ओम प्रकाश वर्मा) is an Indian politician and a member of the Sixteenth Legislative Assembly of Uttar Pradesh in India. He represented the Shikohabad constituency of Uttar Pradesh and is a member of the Samajwadi Party political party.

== Early life and education ==
Om Prakash Verma was born in Firozabad.

== Political career ==
Om Prakash Verma has been a MLA for one term. He represented the Shikohabad constituency and is a member of the Samajwadi Party political party.

== Posts held ==
#	From	To	Position	Comments
01	March 2012	March 2017	Member, 16th Legislative Assembly	

== See also ==
- Shikohabad (Assembly constituency)
- Sixteenth Legislative Assembly of Uttar Pradesh
- Uttar Pradesh Legislative Assembly
