= C. K. Jain =

Indian politician (1935–2021)

- Born: 3 May 1935; Etawah, Uttar Pradesh, India
- Died: 12 December 2021 (aged 86); Gurgaon, Haryana, India
- Education: Allahabad University
- Spouse: Kamla Devi
- Children: 1 son

C. K. Jain (3 May 1935 - 12 December 2021) was a former Secretary-General of the 10th Lok Sabha and Lok Sabha Secretariat, Parliament of India (Lower House of Parliament of India) from 1 January 1992 to 31 May 1994.

== Early life ==
He was born at Etawah, Uttar Pradesh. He holds degrees of B.Com and LL.B. He practised law at Etawah District Court (1954–55) and later he joined Lok Sabha Secretariat (1955) and worked in various positions. He became Secretary General of Lok Sabha and Lok Sabha Secretariat in 1992.
