= Ranjeet Suman =

Indian politician

Ranjeet Suman रणजीत सुमन

MLA, 16th Legislative Assembly
- In office Mar 2012 – Mar 2017
- Preceded by: Kuver Singh
- Succeeded by: Sanjeev Kumar Diwakar
- Constituency: Jalesar

Personal details
- Born: 1 October 1976 (age 50) Hathras district
- Party: Samajwadi Party
- Spouse: Priyanka Suman (wife)
- Children: 2 sons
- Parent: Ramji Lal Suman (father)
- Education: Dr. Bhimrao Ambedkar University
- Profession: Farmer, politician

Ranjeet Suman (Hindi: रणजीत सुमन) is an Indian politician and a member of the Sixteenth Legislative Assembly of Uttar Pradesh in India. He represents the Jalesar constituency of Uttar Pradesh and is a member of the Samajwadi Party political party. Ranjeet belongs to the scheduled caste community.

== Early life and education ==
Ranjeet Suman was born in Hathras district. He attended the Dr. Bhimrao Ambedkar University and attained Master of Arts & Bachelor of Laws degrees.

== Political career ==
Ranjeet Suman has been a MLA for one term. He represented the Jalesar constituency and is a member of the Samajwadi Party political party.

== Posts held ==
#	From	To	Position	Comments
01	2012	2017	Member, 16th Legislative Assembly	

== See also ==
- Jalesar (Assembly constituency)
- Sixteenth Legislative Assembly of Uttar Pradesh
- Uttar Pradesh Legislative Assembly
