= Hariom Yadav =

Indian politician based in Uttar Pradesh

MLA in Uttar Pradesh Legislative Assembly
- In office Mar 2012 – Mar 2022
- Preceded by: Constituency created
- Succeeded by: Sarvesh Singh
- Constituency: Sirsaganj
- In office 2002–2007
- Preceded by: Ashok Yadav
- Succeeded by: Ashok Yadav
- Constituency: Shikohabad

Personal details
- Born: 4 August 1957 (age 69) Firozabad, Uttar Pradesh, India
- Party: Bharatiya Janata Party
- Other political affiliations: Samajwadi Party
- Spouse: Ramsakhi Yadav
- Relations: Akanksha Yadav (daughter-in-law); Tej Pratap Singh Yadav (grandnephew)
- Children: Vijay Pratap Singh Yadav (son)
- Parent: Vidyaram Yadav (father)
- Education: Narain College, Agra University
- Profession: Farmer & politician

Hariom Yadav is an Indian politician and served as MLA of the Sirsaganj Assembly constituency from 2012 to 2022 as member of the Samajwadi Party. In March 2022, he contested Sirsaganj constituency as a member of the Bharatiya Janata Party (BJP) but lost the election.

== Early life and education ==
Hariom Yadav was born in Garhshan a village in the Firozabad district. He attended the Narain College and attained Bachelor of Arts degree.

== Family ==
Hariom Yadav is married to Ramsakhi Yadav. His brother Ram Prakash's daughter, Mridula Yadav is married to Ranvir Singh Yadav, the nephew of Mulayam Singh Yadav.

Mridula Yadav is Block Pramukh of Saifai and mother of former Lok Sabha MP Tej Pratap Singh Yadav.

== Political career ==
Hariom Yadav has been an MLA for three terms. He represented the Sirsaganj constituency as a member of the Samajwadi Party political party.

== Positions held ==
#	From	To	Position	Party
1.	2002	2007	MLA of Shikohabad in 14th Vidhan Sabha	SP
2.	2012	2017	MLA of Sirsaganj in 16th Vidhan Sabha	SP
3.	2017	2022	MLA of Sirsaganj in 17th Vidhan Sabha	SP

== See also ==
- Shikohabad (Assembly constituency)
- Sirsaganj (Assembly constituency)
- Sixteenth Legislative Assembly of Uttar Pradesh
- Uttar Pradesh Legislative Assembly
