= Mukesh Verma =

Indian politician

Member of the Uttar Pradesh legislative assembly
- Incumbent
- Assumed office 11 March 2017
- Preceded by: Om Prakash Verma
- Constituency: Shikohabad

Personal details
- Born: 4 September 1968 (age 58) Firozabad district, Uttar Pradesh, India
- Party: Samajwadi Party (2022-)
- Other political affiliations: Bharatiya Janata Party (until 2021)
- Parent: Hiralal Verma
- Education: Sarojini Naidu Medical College, Dr. Bhimrao Ambedkar University
- Occupation: MLA
- Profession: Politician

Mukesh Verma is an Indian politician and a member of 18th Uttar Pradesh Assembly and also 17th Legislative Assembly of Shikohabad (Assembly constituency), Uttar Pradesh of India. He represents the Firozabad, Ambedkar Nagar constituency of Uttar Pradesh and is a member of Samajwadi Party.

== Political career ==
Verma has been a member of the 17th Legislative Assembly of Uttar Pradesh. Since 2017 he represents the Shikohabad constituency and was a member of the Bharatiya Janata Party.

He joined Samajwadi Party in 2022.

== Posts held ==
#	From	To	Position	Comments
01	2017	2022	Member, 17th Legislative Assembly	
02	2022	Incumbent	Member, 18th Legislative Assembly	

== See also ==
- Uttar Pradesh Legislative Assembly
