= Sarvesh Singh Yadav =

Indian politician

Member of the Uttar Pradesh Legislative Assembly
- Incumbent
- Assumed office March 2022
- Constituency: Sirsaganj

Personal details
- Born: Uttar Pradesh
- Party: Samajwadi Party
- Parent: Udayveer Singh (father)
- Occupation: Politician

Sarvesh Singh Yadav is an Indian politician and a member of the 18th Uttar Pradesh Assembly, representing the Sirsaganj Assembly constituency. He is affiliated with the Samajwadi Party.

== Early life ==
Sarvesh Singh Yadav was born in village Fatehpur Nasirpur, Sirsaganj, Uttar Pradesh to a Yadav family headed by Udayveer Singh.

== Posts held ==
#	From	To	Position	Comments
01	2022	Incumbent	Member, 18th Uttar Pradesh Assembly	
