= Rakesh Babu =

Indian politician

Rakesh Dayal

MLA, Legislative Assembly of Uttar Pradesh
- In office March 2012 – March 2017
- Succeeded by: Satya Pal Singh Baghel
- In office May 2007 – March 2012
- Preceded by: Mohan Dev Shankhvar
- Constituency: Tundla

Personal details
- Born: 1 August 1960 (age 66) Firozabad district
- Party: Bahujan Samaj Party
- Spouse: Kiran Devi (wife)
- Children: 3 sons, 3 daughters
- Parent: Ram Dayal (father)
- Education: Dr. Bhimrao Ambedkar University
- Profession: Farmer and politician

Rakesh Babu is an Indian politician and a member of the Sixteenth Legislative Assembly of Uttar Pradesh in India. He represents the Tundla constituency of Uttar Pradesh and is a member of the Bahujan Samaj Party political party.

== Early life and education ==
Rakesh Babu was born in Firozabad district. He attended the Dr. Bhimrao Ambedkar University and attained Master of Arts degree.

== Political career ==
Rakesh Babu has been a MLA for two terms. He represented the Tundla constituency and is a member of the Bahujan Samaj Party political party.

== Posts held ==
#	From	To	Position	Comments
01	March 2012	March 2017	Member, 16th Legislative Assembly	
02	May 2007	March 2012	Member, 15th Legislative Assembly	

== See also ==
- Sixteenth Legislative Assembly of Uttar Pradesh
- Tundla (Assembly constituency)
- Uttar Pradesh Legislative Assembly
