= Sirsaganj =

Sirsaganj सिरसागंज
- City
- Location in Uttar Pradesh, India
- Country: India
- State: Uttar Pradesh
- District: Firozabad

Government
  - Type: State
- Elevation: 162 m (531 ft)

Population (2011)
  - Total: 28,212(14,926 males 13,286 females)

Hindi
  - Official: Hindi
- Time zone: UTC+5:30 (IST)
- PIN: 205151/283151

Sirsaganj is a city and a municipal board in Firozabad district in the Indian state of Uttar Pradesh.

Sirsaganj is a Vidhan Sabha (Legislative Assembly) constituency of the State of Uttar Pradesh in India.

== Geography ==
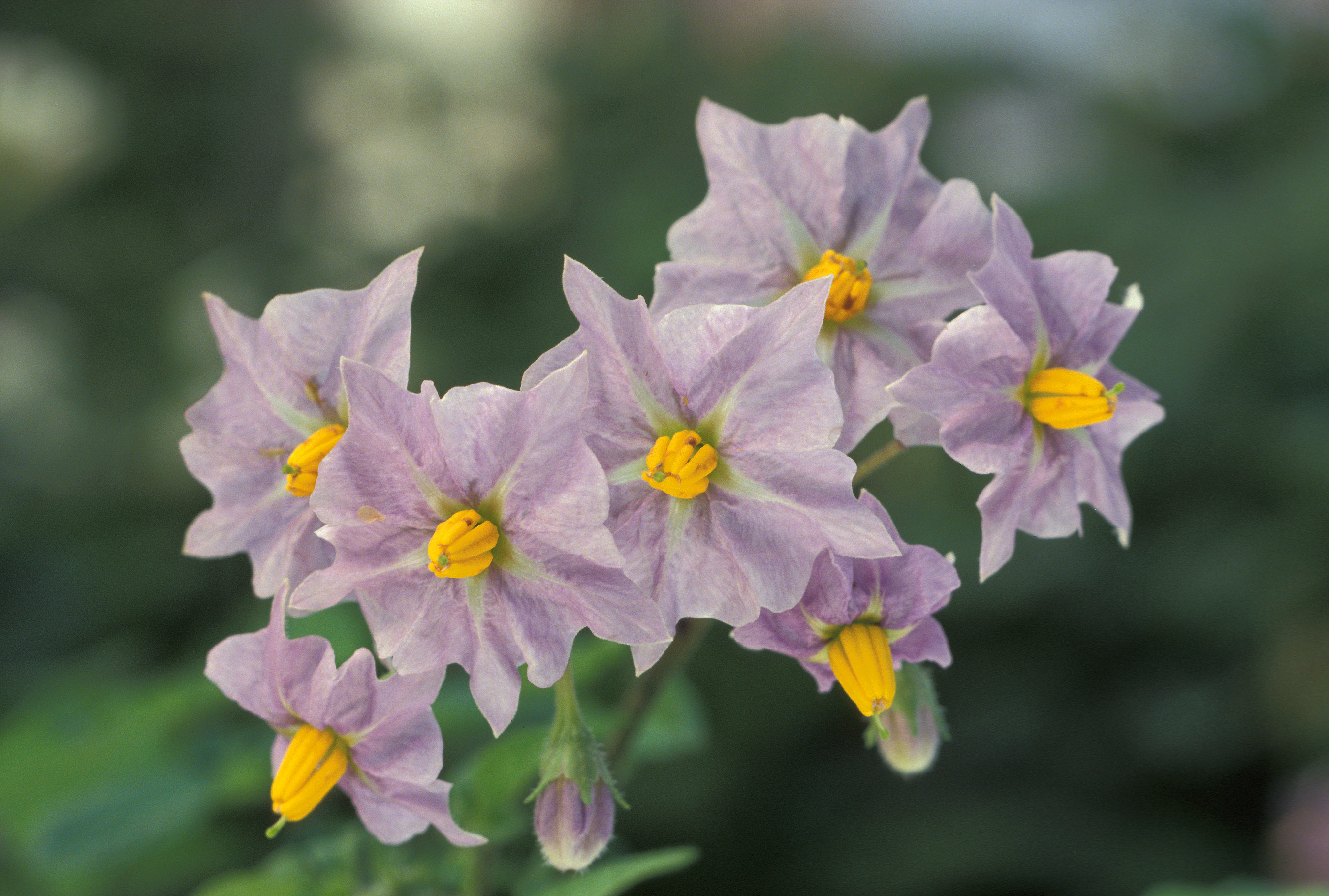
Flowers of a potato plant

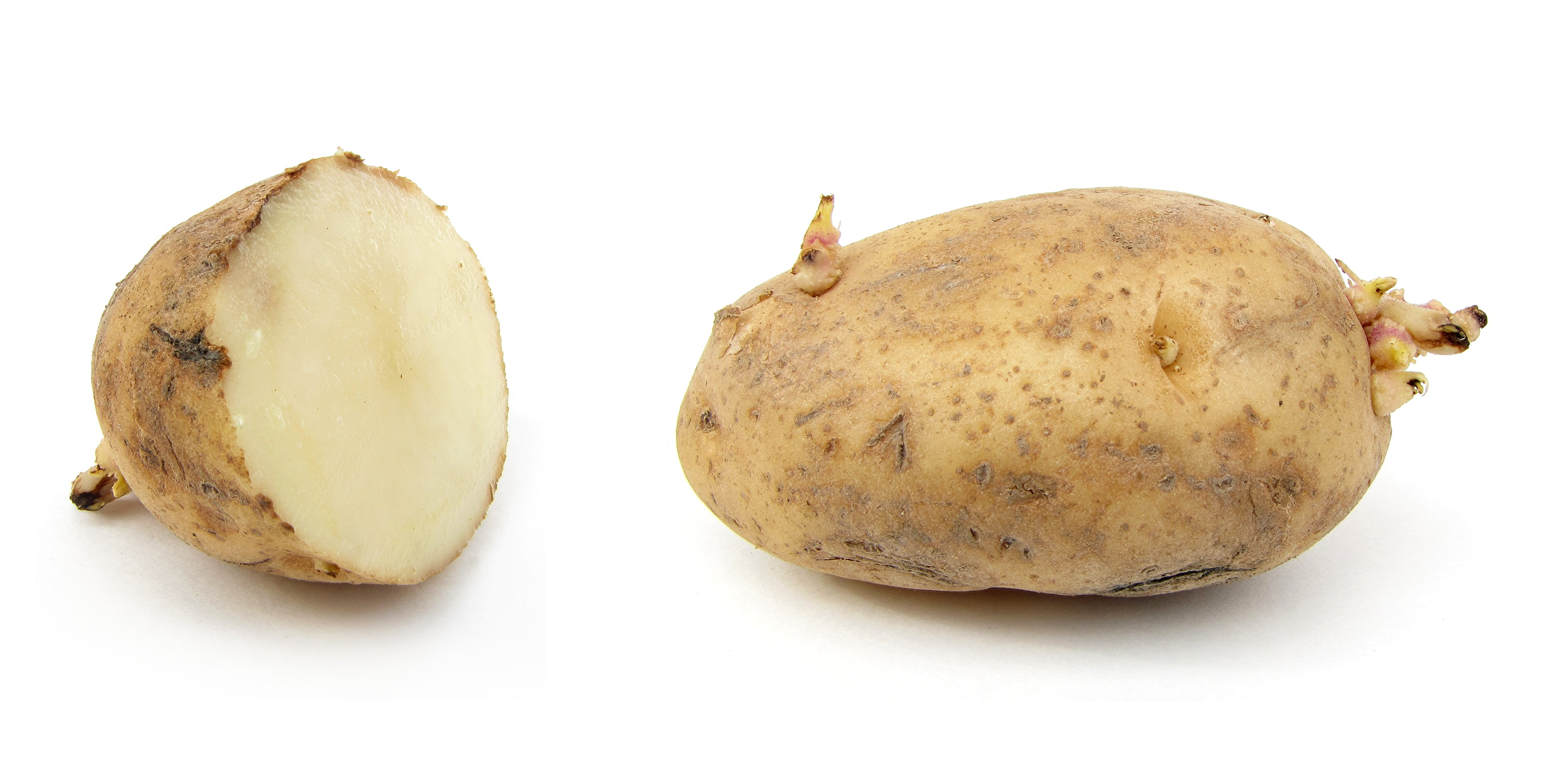
Russet potatoes with sprouts

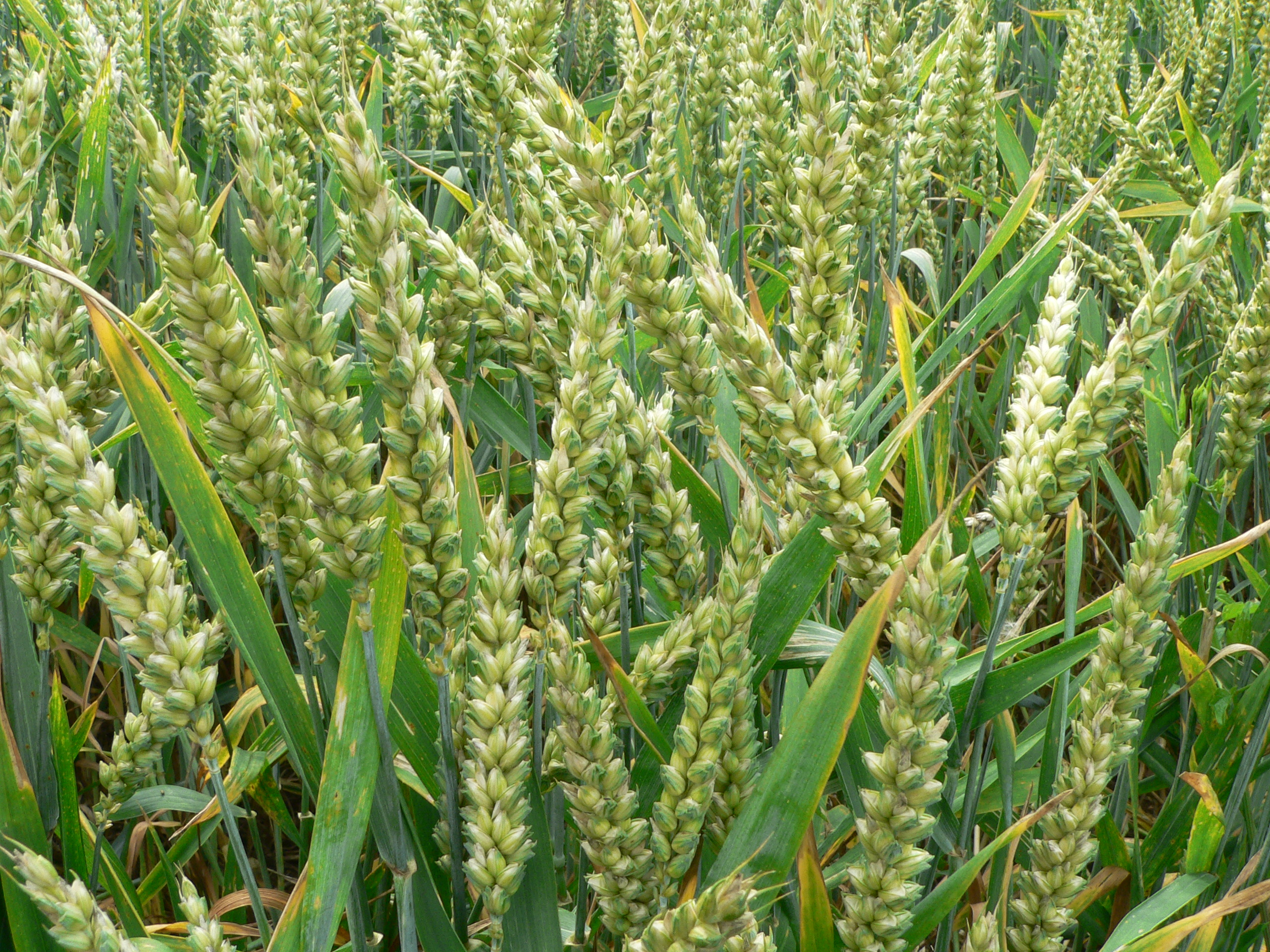
Wheat

Sirsaganj is located at 27°03′25″N 78°41′10″E. It has an average elevation of 162 metres (531 feet).

Sirsaganj is situated at the bank of the river Sirsa. However, the river has gone dry and there are only ruins of the river left in the town.

== People and culture ==
In the town of Sirsaganj, there live 4,404 families constituting a population of 28,212 persons. There live 14,926 males and 13,286 females in Sirsaganj. The sex ratio of Sirsaganj is 887.98 females per 1000 males.

Hinduism is the main religion here. Muslims, Jains, and Sikhs are in minorities. In Hindus, Chandravanshi Rajputs are in majority. This area is mainly inhabited by Yadav and also has a significant population of Sengar and Jadon Rajputs (Chandravanshi) .Jadon Rajputs of sirsaganj are descended from Karauli state via Avagarh state . Spiritual culture of this city is defined as a nearby radius of 5–10 km like Hanumaan Bari, Samor Baba, Jaimai Mata Mandir, Jaduwara, Radha Krishna Mandir, Shri Shakleshwar Mahadev, Shri Vankhandeshwar and Baba Dudhadhari Mandir.

Generally, people of Sirsaganj mainly speak Braj Bhasha which is a dialect of Hindi. People also speak standard Hindi. Many people in the town also have fluency in English. There are also a few speakers of Urdu and Punjabi.

Farming and shopkeeping is the main occupation of the people of Sirsaganj. In Sirsaganj there also live a large number of businesspeople, servicemen, lawyers, and teachers.most of the people are related to agriculture, and potato is the main crop here.

People of the town are generally treated as prospers. But there also live a large number of people under the poverty line. However, this town is considered a peaceful residence. It has a rich culture where people are conservative. A large number of people wear traditional clothes.

== Potatoes and cold storages ==
Potatoes are the chief crop grown in the town of Sirsaganj. Potatoes production is highly notable in the town. The maximum supply of potatoes from here is to Mumbai. Sirsaganj also has a reputed Potato Mandi of Uttar Pradesh. Wheat and chili are other major crops grown in Sirsaganj.

Sirsaganj is also famous for cold storages. There are more than 100 cold storages in the Sirsaganj and nearby. Thus Sirsaganj has a storage capacity of tonnes of biodegradable materials. Sirsaganj feeds many cities around it as chief storage market. Storage capacity is the major means of the economy of Sirsaganj.S.K.D Coldstorage are famous cold of sirsaganj

== Education ==
There are 4 intermediate schools of U.P. board, 5 C.B.S.E. 10+2 school, 3-degree colleges, and many other schools of play way, primary and secondary level in the town of Sirsaganj. There is a large number of teachers giving private tuition. But still, the quality of education is very high as compared to the competition level. Teachers for the U.P. board are enough but quality C.B.S.E. teachers are rare.

Every year a large number of students go outside for higher studies and coachings. However, the success rate even after coaching remains very low.

However, some of the students of the town with their hard work made them clear to top institutes like IIT's, NIT's, IIIT's, NIFT, SPA's, and other Institutes of National Importance.

Sirsaganj has produced a notable number of engineers, doctors, chartered accountants, lawyers over the past few years.

== Transportation ==
Sirsaganj is situated by side of N.H.2 about 70 km far from Agra. Grand Trunk Road passes through the town.

Sirsaganj has no railway station. It has a bus stand. But there remains always a problem with regular bus service.

People use small scale private, public transport like auto, taxis, tata magic for transportation to nearby cities. Many people use their own vehicles like motorcycles and cars for transportation. Crops and animals are generally transported via trucks and tractors.

== Notable people ==
- Hariom Yadav, Member of Legislative Assembly, Sirsaganj,Uttar Pradesh
