= Manish Asiza =

Indian politician

Manish Asija

MLA, 18th Uttar Pradesh Assembly
- Incumbent
- Assumed office March 2022
- Constituency: Firozabad

MLA, 17th Uttar Pradesh Assembly
- In office March 2017 – March 2022

MLA, 16th Uttar Pradesh Assembly
- In office March 2012 – March 2017

Personal details
- Born: Bittu; 20 October 1964 (age 61) Firozabad district
- Party: Bharatiya Janata Party
- Parent: Shi Krishnalal Asija (father)
- Education: S.R.K. (P.G.) College
- Profession: Businessman, politician

Manish Asija (born 20 October 1964) is an Indian politician and a member of the 18th Uttar Pradesh Assembly and also 17th Uttar Pradesh Assembly and Sixteenth Legislative Assembly of Uttar Pradesh in India. He represents the Firozabad constituency of Uttar Pradesh and is a member of the Bharatiya Janata Party political party. He has also previously served as the mayor of Firozabad twice.

== Early life and education ==
Manish Asija was born in Firozabad district. He attended the S.R.K. (P.G.) College and attained Bachelor of Arts degree.

== Political career ==
Manish Asija has been a MLA for three terms. He represented the Firozabad constituency and is a member of the Bharatiya Janata Party political party.

== Posts held ==
| # | From | To | Position | Comments |
|---|---|---|---|---|
| 01 | 2012 | 2017 | Member, 16th Legislative Assembly | |
| 02 | 2017 | 2022 | Member, 17th Legislative Assembly | |
| 03 | 2022 | | Member, 18th Legislative Assembly | Incumbent |

== See also ==
- Firozabad (Assembly constituency)
- Sixteenth Legislative Assembly of Uttar Pradesh
- Uttar Pradesh Legislative Assembly
