= Sanjeev Kumar Diwakar =

Indian politician

Member of Uttar Pradesh Legislative Assembly
- Incumbent
- Assumed office March 2017
- Preceded by: Ranjeet Suman
- Constituency: Jalesar

Personal details
- Party: Bharatiya Janata Party
- Profession: Politician

Sanjeev Kumar Diwakar is an Indian politician and member of the 18th Uttar Pradesh Legislative Assembly. He belongs to Bharatiya Janata Party & represented the Jalesar.
