= Etawah =

City in Uttar Pradesh, India

Etawah Ishtikapuri
- City
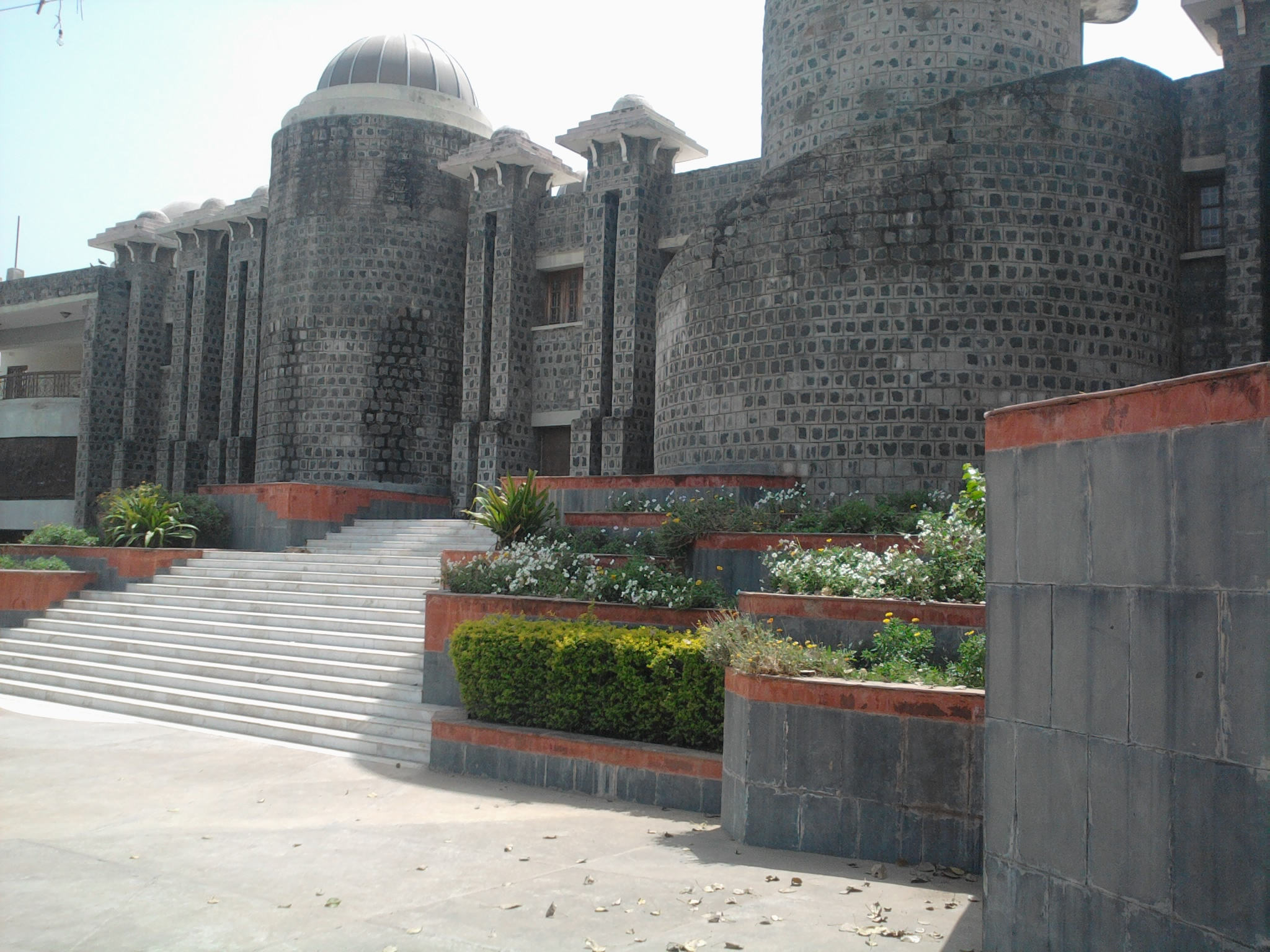
- Sumer Singh Fort
- Nickname: City Of Chief Ministers
- Location within Uttar Pradesh Location within India
- Coordinates: 26.77°N 79.03°E
- Country: India
- State: Uttar Pradesh
- District: Etawah

Government
  - Type: Municipal Council
  - Body: Etawah Nagar Palika Parishad
  - MLA (Etawah constituency): Sarita Bhadauria (Bharatiya Janata Party)
  - MP: Jitendra Kumar Dohare (Samajwadi Party)
- Elevation: 197 m (646 ft)

Population (2011)
  - Total: 256,838
  - Rank: 174th
  - Density: 684/km^{2} (1,770/sq mi)
- Demonym: Etawian

Languages
  - Official: Hindi, Urdu
  - Regional: Braj Bhasha
- Time zone: UTC+5:30 (IST)
- 206001: 2060xx
- Telephone code: 05688
- Vehicle registration: UP-75
- Coastline: 0 kilometres (0 mi)
- Sex ratio: 896/1000 ♂/♀
- Literacy: 81.75%
- Website: www.etawah.nic.in

Etawah (IAST: Iṭāvā), also known as Ishtikapuri, is a city situated on the banks of Yamuna River in the state of Uttar Pradesh in India. It is the administrative headquarters of Etawah District. Etawah's population of 256,838 (as per 2011 population census) makes it the 180th most populous city in India. The city lies 324 km (201 mi) southeast of the national capital New Delhi, 225 km (140 mi) northwest of the state capital Lucknow, 129 km (80 mi) east of Agra, 125 km (78 mi) northeast of Gwalior, 40 km (25 mi) northeast of Bhind, 55 km (34.40 mi) from Mainpuri, 156 km (106 mi) west of Kanpur and 360 km (225 mi) from Prayagraj. The city was an important centre for the Indian Rebellion of 1857. It is also the sangam or confluence of the Yamuna and Chambal rivers. It is the 26th most populous city in Uttar Pradesh. There are six revenue divisions in Etawah district-Etawah, Bharthana, Jaswantnagar, Saifai, Chakarnagar and Takha.In the medieval times Etawah was ruled by various rulers like Sultans of Delhi, Mughals and most notably in the late 13th Century to early 16th century by the Tomaras of Gwalior who came from Delhi and settled in Gwalior and ruled the adjacent areas.

== Demographics ==
Religions in Etawah city (2011)
Religion	Percent
Hindus	74.64%
Muslims	23.61%
Jains	1.05%
Distribution of religions

As per the 2011 census, Etawah city had a population of 256,790, of which males were 135,829, and females were 120,961 - an increase of 22% from 211,460 in 2001 census. (The entire Etawah district had a population of 1,581,810 in 2011.) The literacy rate was 82.89 per cent. Hinduism is majority religion in Etawah city with 74.64% followers. Islam is second most popular religion in city of Etawah, with approximately 23.61% following it. In Etawah city, Christianity is followed by 0.19%, Jainism by 1.05%, Sikhism by 0.24% and Buddhism by 0.24%. Around 0.01% stated 'Other Religion', approximately 0.19% stated 'No Particular Religion'.

Main spoken languages are Hindi (98.20%), Urdu (1.75%), and Sindhi (0.01%)

Total no. of Slums in Etawah city numbers 5,528 in which population of 33,188 resides. This is around 12.92% of total population of Etawah city.

== Name ==
During Medevial era the king of Chauhan dynasty Sumershah had gone to the bank of the Yamuna river in Etawah, where he saw an incredible act of nature. He saw a goat and a wolf drinking water together on the bank of the Yamuna. After seeing this incident, the king went to astrologers and consulted about the incident, who advised him to build a fort at the place where the wolf and the goat were drinking water together. According to astrological calculation, building a fort would benefit the king. When construction work of the fort started at the decided location, then, while digging foundation the laborers working there found a brick of gold and silver, which made them excited and they started shouting "Eeet Mili, Eeet Mili" after hearing which the place was named as "Eeet Aaya" which later turned into 'Etawah'.

Etawah is still sometimes referred to as the city of bricks and both tradition and the appearance of the ground suggest that the modern city was founded on an ancient Khera or town site, so that it is not improbable that the existence of old bricks or old brick kilns may have led to its present name. According to some scholars, the region from Bateshwar in district Agra to Bhareh was known as 'Ishtapath' and there are a large number of temples of Lord Siva, who was 'Isht Dev' of the people of that region. From the word 'Isht' the town was given the name of Ishtkapuri a reference to which is found in Bhavishya Puran.

== History ==
=== Ancient era ===
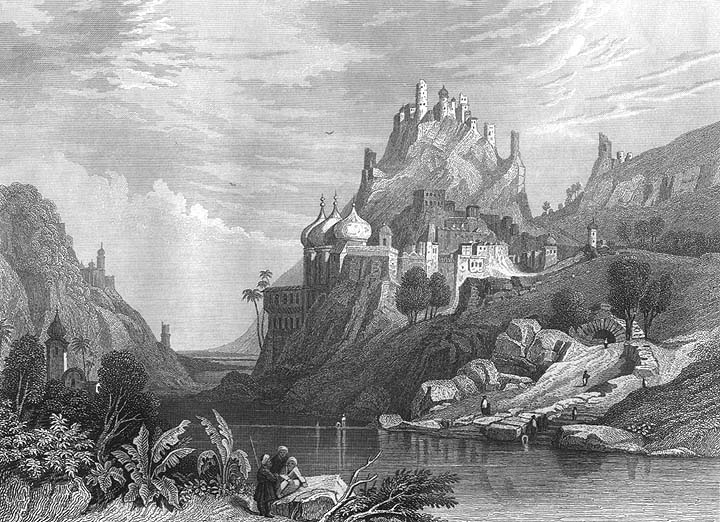
An engraving of ruins at Etawah, in the first half of the 19th century AD

It is believed that the land existed right from the Bronze Age in the medieval times. It once formed part of the ancient Janapada of Panchala which is said to have extended from the foot of the Himalayas in the north to the river Chambal in the south. This region rose into great prominence during the period of Mahabharata. Many local traditions are attached to the modern Chakar Nagar which is a tehsil nearby which most probably seems to be Ekchakra mentioned in Mahabharata. It was Ekchakra where Pandavas along with their mother Kunti spent their secret abode of one year during the period of their exile. There is a belief that the city was founded by King Bharat. During the fourth century A.D., Guptas once again established imperial unity in India. The Chinese traveler Fa-Hien also visited a city named 'A-lo i.e. Alvi', which has been identified with modern Airwa nearly town, and spent his treat at the Dragon Shrine. Fa-Hien described it as "a city near a large forest" (atavi). There are the remains of Buddhist and Jain temples evidently of every ancient date in large number. In the ninth and tenth centuries, this region was under the rule of Gurjara Pratihara rulers. The conquest of Kannauj by Nagabhata II handed Gurjjaras control over this region. But the place was said to be evolved as an affluent region under Mihira Bhoja, the Gurjara Pratihara King.

With the coronation of Harsha as a king (in 606 AD) the city came under the Thaneshwer Kingdom. Hiuen Tsang in his works has also dwelt upon the prosperity of this region.

=== Medieval Era ===
The defeat of Jaichandra of Kannauj in the Battle of Chandawar in 1193 A.D at the hands of Shahab-ud-din Ghori, the city passed under influence of Muslim power, which by end of the century held in different degrees of subjection the whole of North India except Malwa and some contiguous districts. Muslim rule in Etawah faced Maratha invasion for short period within their rule in Etawah. However, the local history of the city during the early years of the thirteenth century is more or less the account of the settlement and emergence of certain Rajput clans. The Gaurs occupied part of Phaphund and Bidhuna near the Kanpur boundary, both falling in turn to Chandelas of Mahoba. The Chauhans occupied the western portion of the district, with extensive tracts now in Mainpuri. During this period; however, some disturbance related to tax arouse in Nasir-ud-din Muhammad Shah's rule, yet these issues were put to end by Tomar ruler of Gwalior in 1390. In 1400–1401 Mallu Iqbal Khan marched towards this region and was opposed by Rai Sumar Singh or Sabir of Etawah and other Zamindars of the vicinity on the banks of the Ab-i-Siyah (Kali Nadi) near Patiali. The opposing army of Rai was defeated and chased down to the confines of Etawah where they took shelter.

Etawah was associated with various important historical events like Jaunpur Campaign, reigns of rulers like Bahlul Lodi, Ibrahim Lodi, Babur, Humayun and Akbar. In the fourth year of Akbar's reign, Bahadur Khan, a younger brother of Ali Quli Khan, was granted the Jagir of Etawah at the insistence of Maham Anka, the foster mother of the Emperor. After this, Etawah district underwent major changes during reign of Rohillas and the Oudh Government.

=== Colonial Era ===
The cession on 10 November 1801, the city was made over to the British Government by the Nawab Saadat Ali Khan together with the rest of the lower Doab and other tracts. This action was taken in return for a guarantee of protection, and by way of payment for the maintenance of the Oadh local forces which were ultimately stationed at Kanpur. Still for some years Etawah was threatened with Maratha inroads, while scenes occurred with the zamindars in the earlier years of the British administration which recall the experiences of the imperial officers in the 16th century, and it was not until the zamindars of Saudaus, Sahson and Kamait had been finally settled with in 1816 A.D.

=== The Revolt of 1857 ===
On 25 December 1857, a British Column arrived in the city. Kunwar Johar Singh now surrounded and blew up the Etawah tahsil building from where Taj Khan was resisting the British advance. On 6 January 1858, the British reoccupied Etawah, but struggle was hardly crushed.

=== Freedom Struggle ===
In 1907, rumours were afloated in Etawah that Zorawar Singh Nigam, had organized a conspiracy to throw out the British. But on enquiry it was found baseless and a person Khalil who was responsible for the rumour, was arrested and sentenced. In 1914–15, the city came into prominence as a centre of revolutionary activity when Genda Lal Dixit, a teacher at Auraiya nearby town, formed the Shivaji Samitti with object of liberating the country. Gendalal Dixit had also organized a group of young men called 'Matri-Vedi'.

In 1920 Mahatma Gandhi launched his non-cooperation movement all over the country. In Etawah, the response of the people to this movement was enthusiastic and wide spread. In 1920–21, the district congress committee was formed with Maulana Rahamat Ullah as its president. In 1925, Jyoti Shankar Dixit of Etawah was arrested in connection with the Kakori conspiracy case but later released. In 1928, boycott of the Simon Commission; followed by; the civil disobedience movement in 1930 and Quit India Movement 1942 were started in Etawah, as in other parts of the country.

After Independence of India till January 1974, 548 freedom fighters were awarded Tamra Patras, i.e. copper plates containing a record of the services rendered by them or their forebears.

== Municipal Council, Etawah ==
Municipal Council, Etawah was founded through Notificatin-332 date 11 July 1884 on 16 August 1884. At that time district was divided into 10 wards. Now it has 36 wards . The chairman is Jyoti Santu Gupta with Executive Officer Shri Anil Kumar .

Director
Sr.No	Name
1	Mr. Kushagra Singh (Aadi)

Ex-officio members
Sr.No	Name of Ex-officio members	Position	Name of
1	Mr. Ansar Ahmad	Member of Parliament	Kalikabre, Etawah
2	Mr. Rajendra Sngh Kushwaha	MLA, Sadar	Tulsi Adda, Etawah

Elected Ward Members
Ward no.	Name of elected candidate	Director/ Member	Name of ward
1	Mr. Gambhir Singh	Member	K.F.M Khan II
2	Mr. Ravi Kumar	Member	Friends Colony II
3	Mr. Abhay Singh	Member	Katra Balsingh I
4	Mr. Arvind	Member	Sundarpur
5	Mr. Dilip Kumar Dubey	Member	Katra Sahab Khan
6	Mr. Jayveer Singh	Member	Friends Colony III
7	Mrs. Shanti Devi	Member	Gaadipura
8	Mr. Mahendra Kumar	Member	Vijay Nagar III
9	Mrs. Madhu	Member	Civil Line I
10	Mrs. Usha Devi	Member	Mewati Tola
11	Mr. Mohammad Anees	Member	Sabitganj
12	Ms. Mithilesh	Member	Vijay Nagar I
13	Mrs. Rajanshri	Member	Purabia Tola Nalapar
14	Mrs. Neelam Dubey	Member	Karanpura
15	Mrs. Uma	Member	Friends Colony I
16	Mrs. Santosh Kumari	Member	Lalpura
17	Mr. Shabir	Member	Shahgraan
18	Mrs. Roopkiran Verma	Member	Ghatiya Ajmat Ali II
19	Mr. Deepak	Member	Chaugurji
20	Mrs. Manju Devi	Member	Vijay Nagar II
21	Mr. ratnesh	Member	Ashok Nagar I
22	Mr. Srikrishna Yadav	Member	Ghatiya Ajmat Ali II
23	Mr. Imran Hashmi	Member	Katra Shamsher Khan
24	Mrs. Lilavati	Member	K.F.M Khan I
25	Mr. Vimal	Member	Maksoodpura
26	Mrs. Nazma	Member	Chhipaiti
27	Mrs. Ruby Begum	Member	Bairuntola
28	Mr. Iqbal	Member	Pathvaria
29	Mr. Sharad Bajpayee	Member	Akalganj
30	Mr. Sunil	Member	Ashok Nagar II
31	Mrs. Pushpa	Member	Civil Line II
32	Mr. Shafeek Mast Khan	Member	Urdu Mohalla
33	Mr. Udayraj Singh	Member	Ashok Nagar III
34	Mr. Mohd Iliyaas	Member	Naurangabad
35	Mr. Anil	Member	Katra Balsingh II
36	Mr. Vaibhav Kumar	Member	Purabia Tola Pajava

Elected by Government
Header text	Name of elected candidate
1	Mr. Mohd Nazir Ansari
2	Mr. rakesh Yadav
3	Mr. Amit Soni
4	Mr. Ramesh Prajapati

== Climate ==
The climate is a hot semi arid climate (Koppen: BSh), being slightly too dry to be considered a humid subtropical climate (Koppen: Cwa).

Climate data for Etawah (1991–2020 normals, extremes 1982–present)
Month	Jan	Feb	Mar	Apr	May	Jun	Jul	Aug	Sep	Oct	Nov	Dec	Year
Record high °C (°F)	29.0 (84.2)	36.1 (97.0)	42.0 (107.6)	46.4 (115.5)	48.6 (119.5)	47.6 (117.7)	44.2 (111.6)	42.0 (107.6)	39.2 (102.6)	38.4 (101.1)	38.2 (100.8)	31.2 (88.2)	48.6 (119.5)
Mean daily maximum °C (°F)	20.0 (68.0)	24.8 (76.6)	30.9 (87.6)	38.8 (101.8)	42.0 (107.6)	40.6 (105.1)	35.2 (95.4)	33.0 (91.4)	32.7 (90.9)	31.6 (88.9)	27.8 (82.0)	22.7 (72.9)	31.8 (89.2)
Mean daily minimum °C (°F)	6.4 (43.5)	9.6 (49.3)	13.9 (57.0)	19.4 (66.9)	24.1 (75.4)	25.6 (78.1)	24.7 (76.5)	23.9 (75.0)	22.9 (73.2)	18.9 (66.0)	13.4 (56.1)	8.1 (46.6)	17.6 (63.7)
Record low °C (°F)	0.4 (32.7)	1.4 (34.5)	6.8 (44.2)	7.5 (45.5)	11.4 (52.5)	14.2 (57.6)	17.0 (62.6)	14.2 (57.6)	13.0 (55.4)	2.0 (35.6)	5.7 (42.3)	1.3 (34.3)	0.4 (32.7)
Average rainfall mm (inches)	7.4 (0.29)	11.8 (0.46)	4.8 (0.19)	3.3 (0.13)	14.4 (0.57)	43.1 (1.70)	233.1 (9.18)	199.1 (7.84)	121.8 (4.80)	32.8 (1.29)	3.8 (0.15)	7.6 (0.30)	703.5 (27.70)
Average rainy days	0.6	0.8	0.6	0.5	1.0	2.7	7.4	8.7	5.0	1.1	0.3	0.5	29.2
Average relative humidity (%) (at 17:30 IST)	70	60	49	40	38	50	69	77	74	66	66	72	61
Source: India Meteorological Department

== Communal Clashes ==
In 1885 when Dussehra and Muharram coincided, communal disturbances broke out between the Hindus and the Muslims.

== Economy ==
Gross District Domestic Product (At Current Price)	9,24,258 Lakhs (2015–16)
Gross District Domestic Product (At Constant)	6,96,774 Lakhs (2011–12)
Net District Domestic Product (At Current Price)	8,20,371 Lakhs (2015–16)
Net District Domestic Product	6,10,494 Lakhs (2011–12)
Per Capita Income (NDDP, At Factor Cost)(At Current Price)	48,850 (2015–16)
Per Capita Income (NDDP, At Factor Cost)(At Constant)	36,353 (2011–12)

Manufacturing (Industries) Share in GDP Manufacturing accounted for 22142 lakhs at Current Prices (2015–16), 19646 Lakhs at Constant Price (2011–12)

== Transport ==
=== Air ===
The city is served by Saifai Domestic Airport, which is around 15 km from city center. The airport has only unscheduled chartered flights. The nearest domestic airport is at Gwalior Airport which is 117 km. The nearest International Airport is Chaudhary Charan Singh International Airport located at a distance of around 220 km.

=== Rail ===
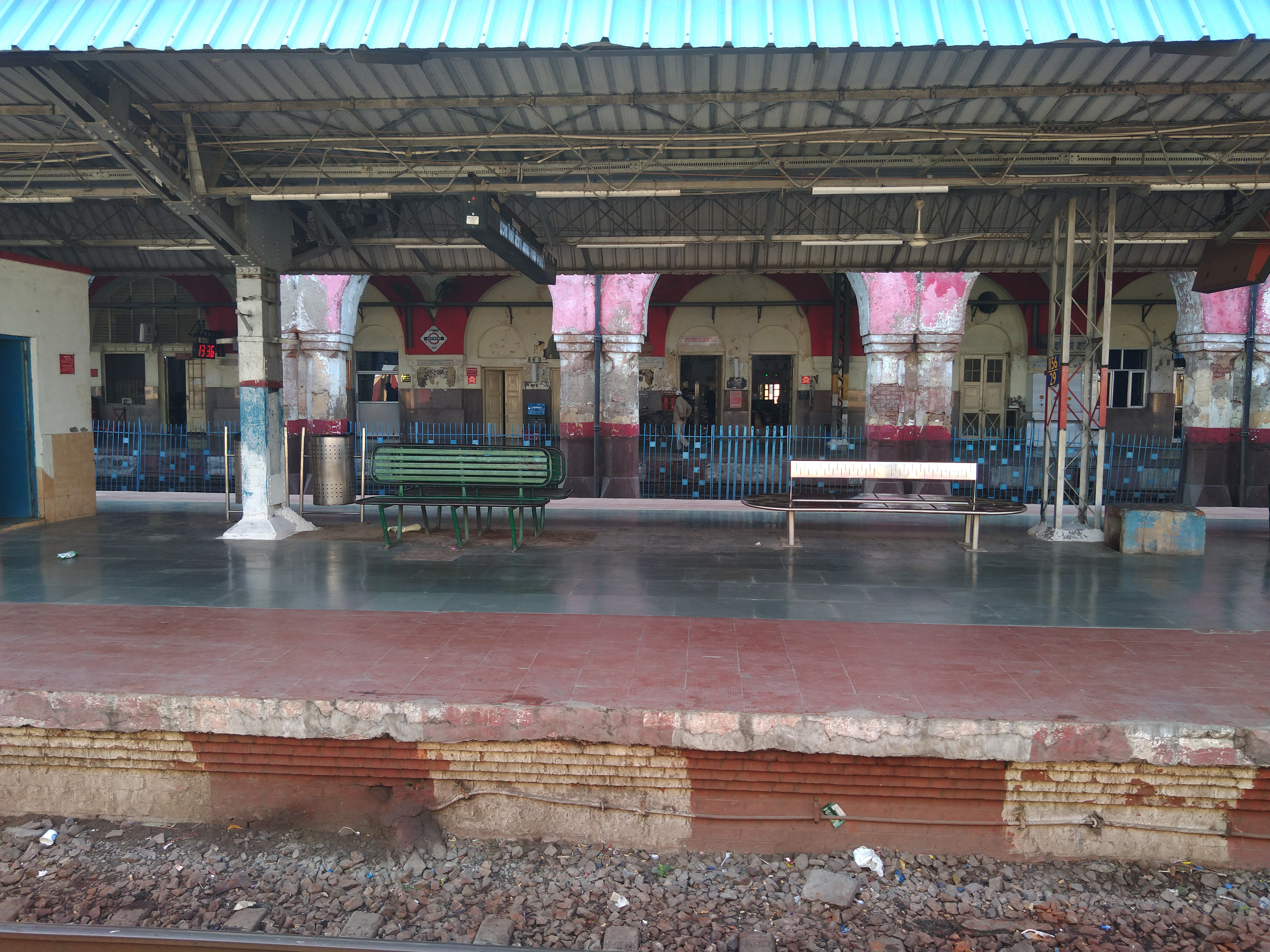
Itawah Jn Railway Station

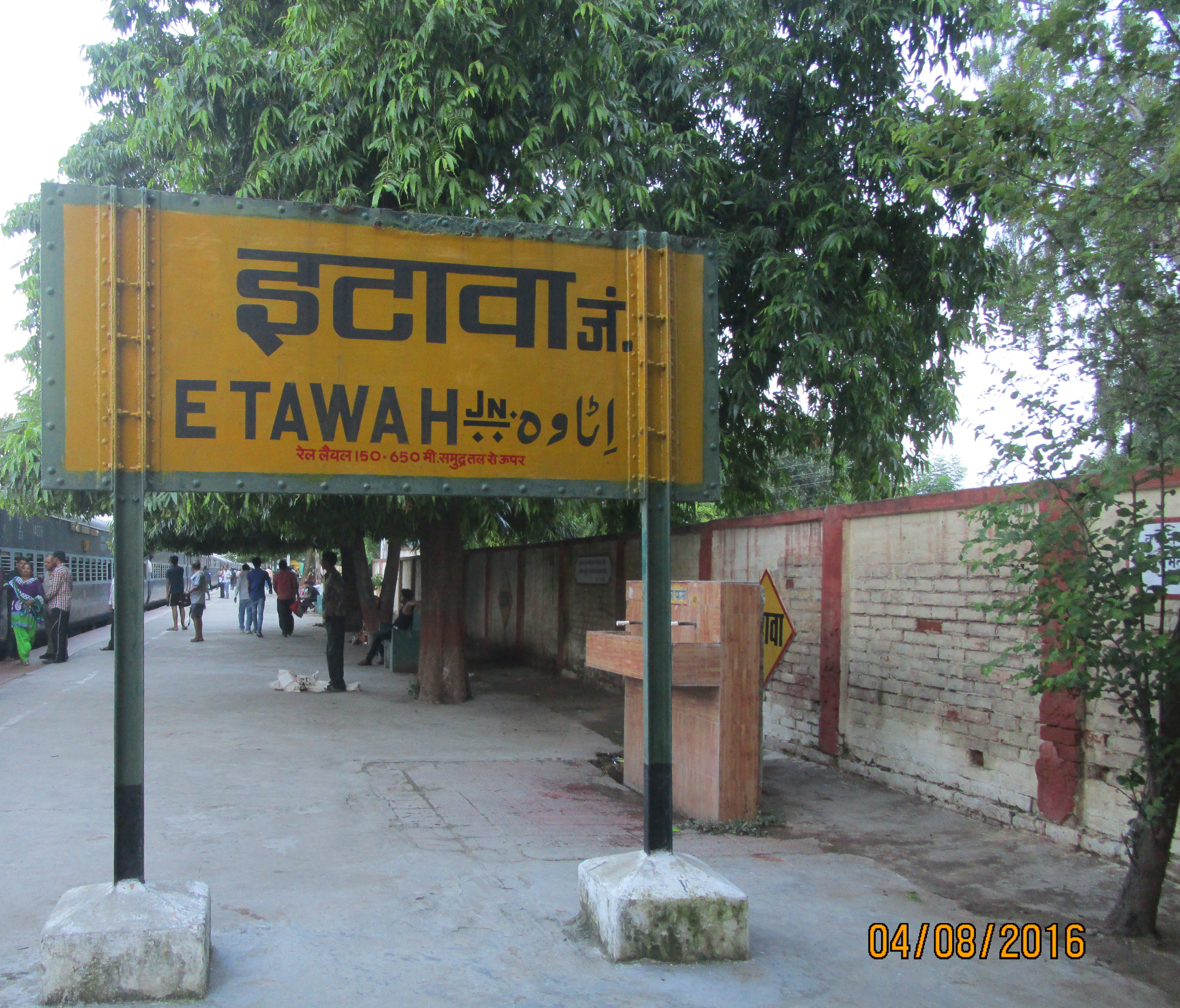
Etawah Jn

Etawah Junction railway station is the main station of the city as well as of the Howrah-Delhi main line and Guna - Etawah Rail Line. It is a NSG-3 category station of Prayagraj division of North Central Railway. It has a secondary railway line to Agra via reserved sanctuary area. Etawah - Mainpuri line is also constructed and train is running between Etawah and Mainpuri. One another railway line from Etawah to Bindki is to be constructed. It has halt for fastest trains like Kanpur New Delhi Shatabdi Express, Lucknow Swarna Shatabdi Express and many more. Etawah Junction is one of the cleanest railway station of Indian Railways. Necessary basic amenities like water taps, pay and use toilets, foot over bridges, elevators, platform shed, waiting hall, railway enquiry window, computerized reservation hall, ATMs, food stalls, integrated train information system, train announcement system, train display boards, platform - coach indicators, infotainment screens, wheelchair accessible ramp can be found at the station. The city is also served by four other railway stations viz. Udi Junction, Sarai Bhopat, Ekdil and Vaidhpura.

=== Road ===
Etawah is well-connected by roads with the rest of Uttar Pradesh state. Etawah is the regional office of Etawah Region of UP Roadways. It has buses for all cities of Uttar Pradesh as well as for all neighbouring states. It has buses to Delhi for every 15 minutes. National Highway 19 passes through Etawah, connecting it to important cities like Delhi, Mathura, Agra, Kanpur, Allahabad, Varanasi, Gurugram, Dhanbad and Kolkata. There are three big cities namely Gwalior, Agra and Kanpur, near Etawah with well connected roads.

Agra Lucknow Expressway have various cuts, from where roads connect it to city like with Farrukhabad Road near Baralokpur, with Etawah - Mainpuri State Highway near Karhal, with NH 19 near Bhadan.

Within the city, auto-rickshaw and cycle rickshaw are the major forms of transport. Bus services run at high frequencies. Etawah city is waiting for city bus services as it was announced by UPA government to run 85 city buses to connect the city and to develop a ring road around the city. City buses will be available from Sai City Udaypur in North to Udi More in South, from Sarai Bhopat in the west to Pilkhar in the east. It will cover 50 km (approx.) distance if starts.

== Education ==
=== Colleges ===
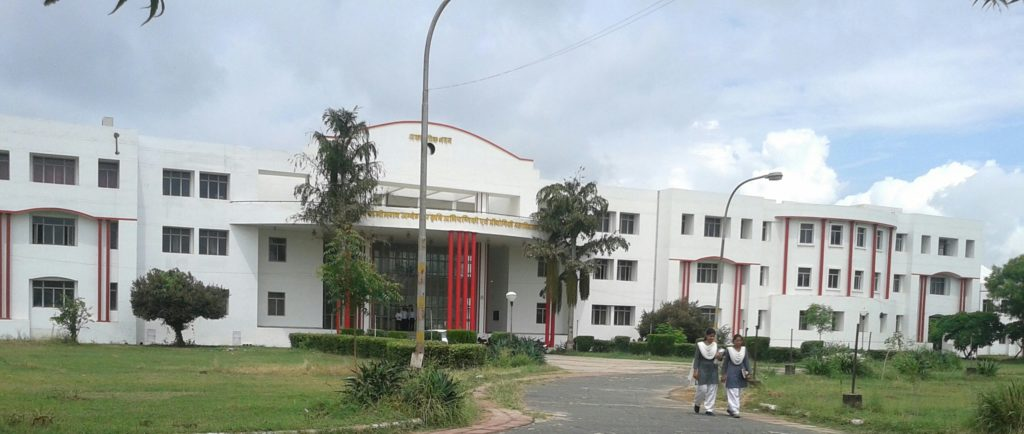
Baba Saheb Dr. B.R.A. College of Agriculture Engineering & Technology

- Chandra Shekhar Azad University of Agriculture and Technology, based in Kanpur has a campus in Etawah, established in 1994–95.
- Chaudhary Charan Singh Post Graduate College offers undergraduate and post-graduate courses in Science, Arts, Commerce faculties. The college is affiliated to Chhatrapati Shahu Ji Maharaj University.
- College of Dairy Technology, Etawah, established in 2015 is a constituent college and faculty of Kanpur's Chandra Shekhar Azad University of Agriculture and Technology.
- College of Fisheries Science and Research Centre, Etawah, established in 2015, is a constituent college and faculty of Kanpur's Chandra Shekhar Azad University of Agriculture and Technology.
- Government Girls Post Graduate College, Etawah is a government women's college offering BA, BCom and MA (Hindi, Sociology & Economics) courses in Etawah. The college is affiliated to Chhatrapati Shahu Ji Maharaj University.
- Karm Kshetra Post Graduate College is a college offering undergraduate and post-graduate courses in Science, Arts, Commerce faculties. The college is affiliated to Chhatrapati Shahu Ji Maharaj University
- Uttar Pradesh University of Medical Sciences (UPUMS), established in 2016, (Formerly Uttar Pradesh Rural Institute of Medical Sciences and Research (U.P. RIMS&R) which established in 2005 and was affiliated to Chhatrapati Shahu Ji Maharaj University Kanpur).

== Places of interest ==
=== Etawah Safari Park ===
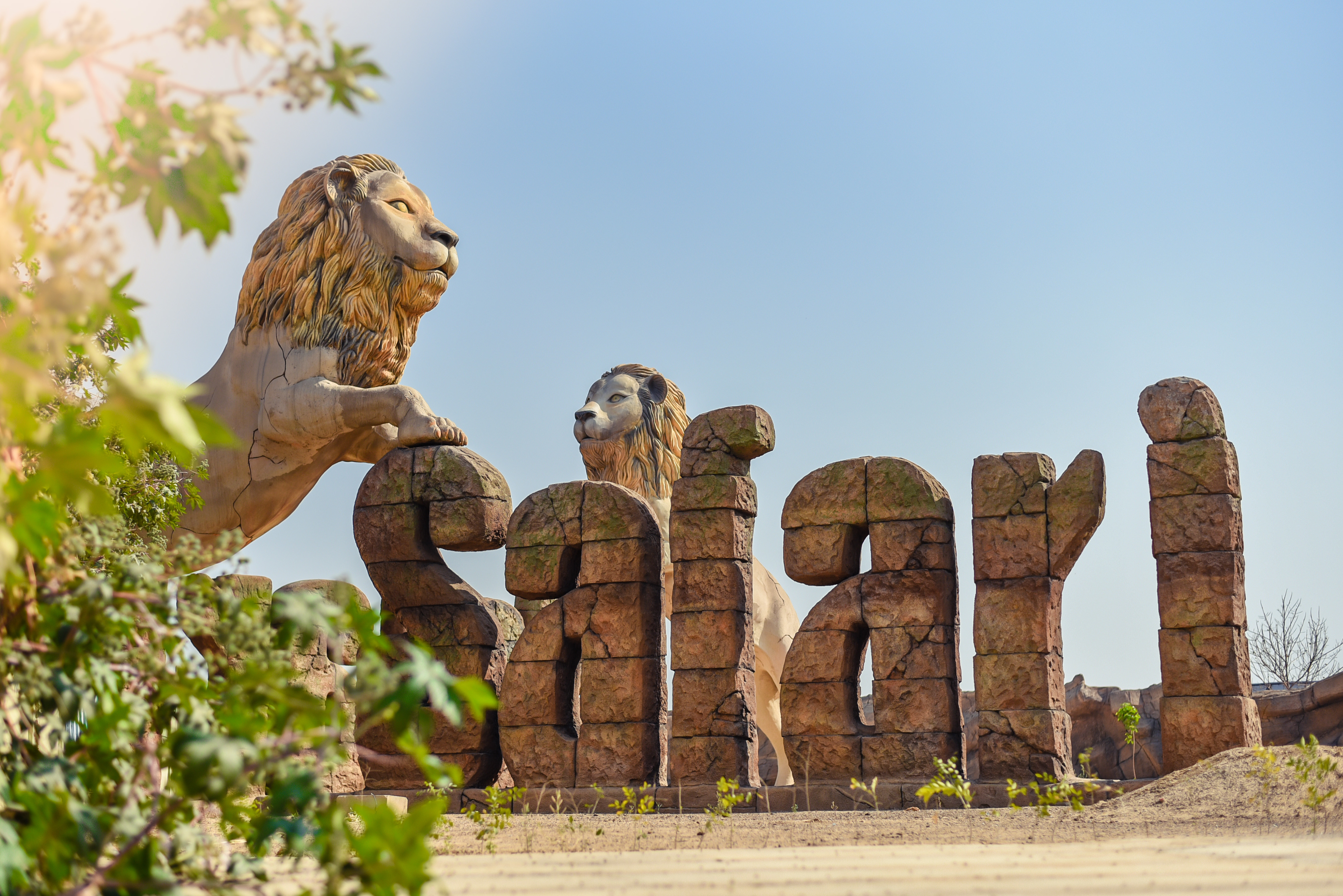
Etawah Safari Park

In Etawah Lion Safari, visitors will move in caged paths while the lions and other animals are seen moving freely in the jungle. The Lion Safari, which is mainly being developed to provide an alternate home to Asiatic lions, that are now limited only to Gir Forests in Gujarat will also feature a Lion Breeding Centre.

=== National Chambal Sanctuary ===
National Chambal Sanctuary is spread over the Agra and Etawah districts, and a total of 290 different species of migratory and resident birds have been identified in the region so far.

=== Sarsai Nawar Wetland ===
Sarsai Nawar Wetland is a Ramsar enlisted site wetland, en route to Saman Wildlife Sanctuary, in Etawah District of Uttar Pradesh. It comprises two small lakes that attract Sarus Cranes, White Ibis and other water birds in large numbers. It has a large population of the threatened species of Sarus Cranes, the world's tallest flying birds. Ten Sarus Crane pairs breed here regularly, which is more than twice the number of breeding pairs in the bird sanctuary of Bharatpur in Rajasthan. In winters, almost more than 40,000 migratory birds from northern arc visit Sarsai Nawar wetland.

=== Agra-Etawah Cycle Highway ===
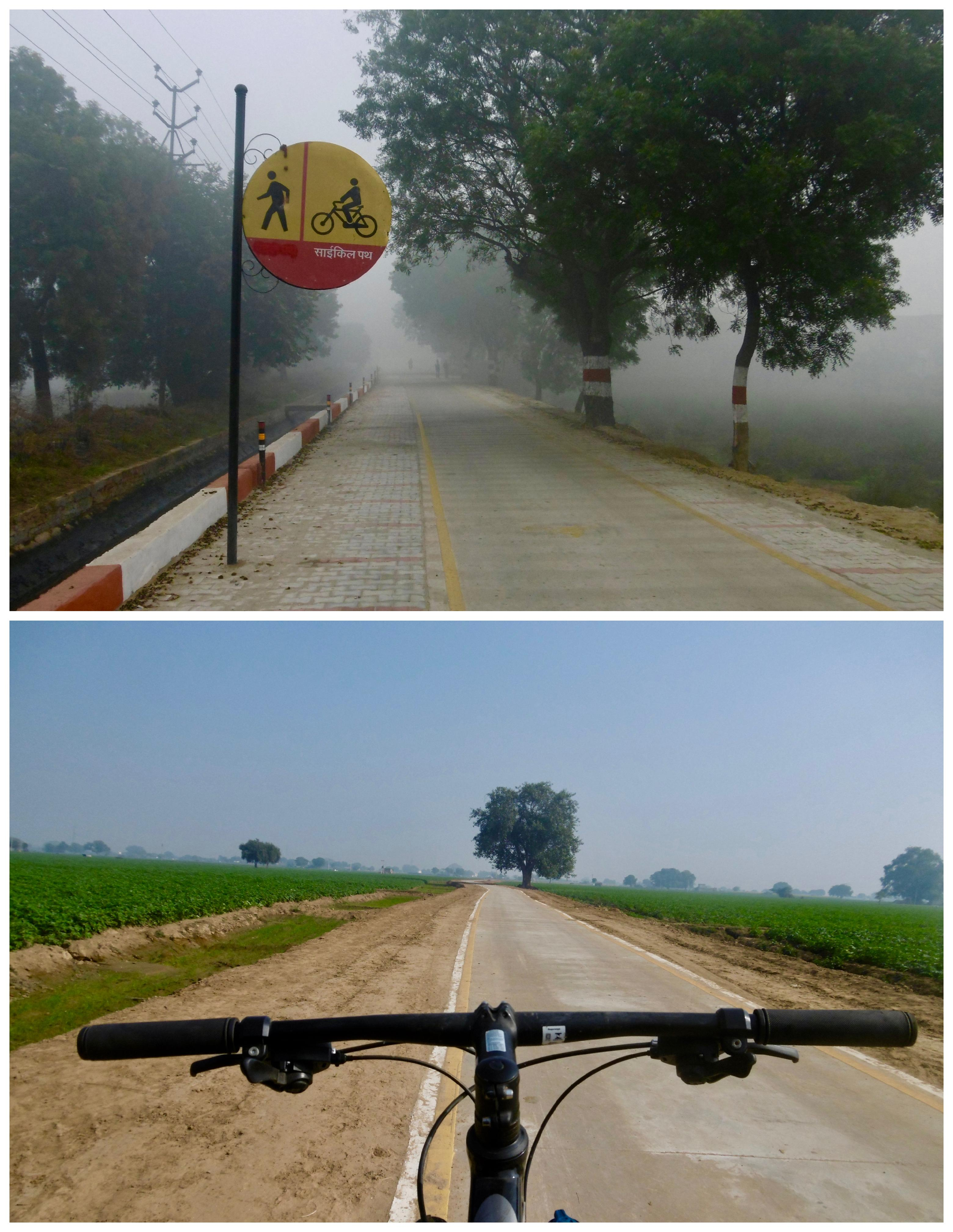
Cycle Highway

Agra-Etawah Cycle Highway in Uttar Pradesh now has Asia's first cycle highway. A first-of-its-kind project, the 207-km-long cycle highway runs between Etawah and Agra and was declared open on Saturday, 27 November 2016. The track begins from the lion safari in Etawah. It ends at the eastern gate of the Taj Mahal in Agra.

== Notable Buildings ==
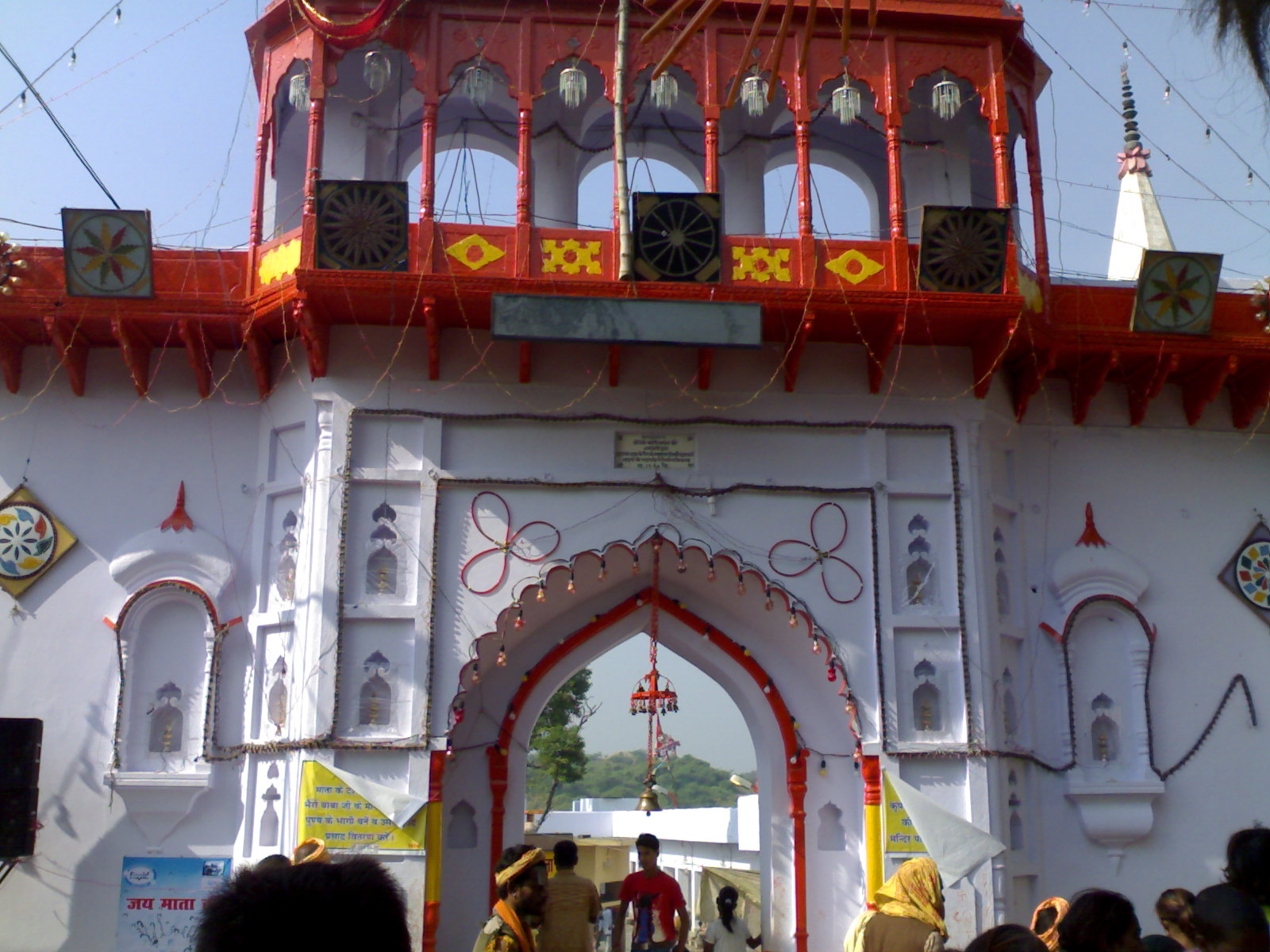
Kali Vahan Shakta pitha

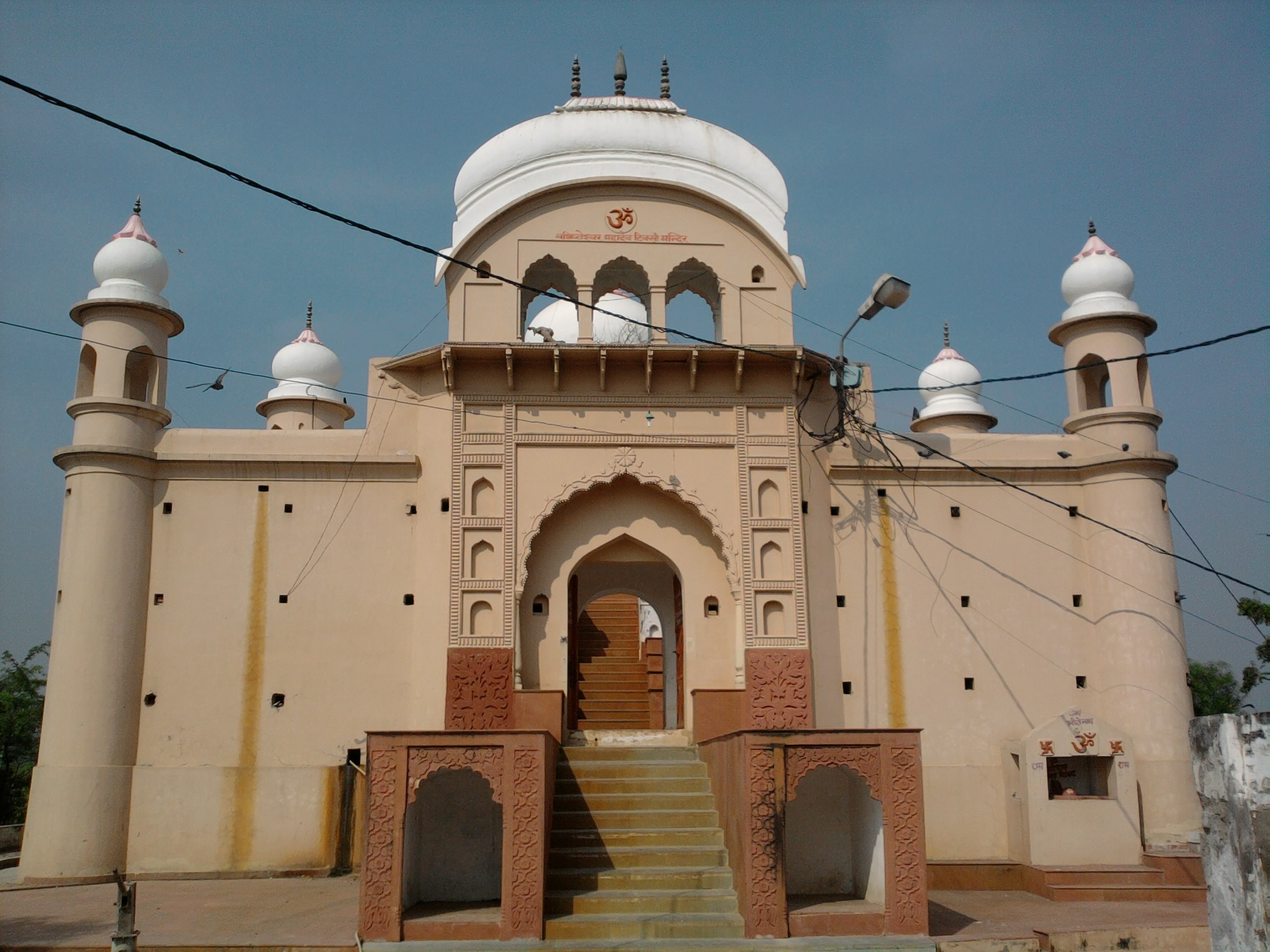
Tixi Shiva Mandir

- Hajari Mahadev Temple Sarsai Nawar
- Pachnada, Etawah
- Shahi Jama Masjid

== Notable people ==
- George Adamson, wildlife conservationist
- K. Asif, film director was born in Etawah
- Sarita Bhadauria, MLA from Etawah
- Babu Gulabrai, a significant figure in modern Hindi literature was born in Etawah
- Allan Octavian Hume, the founder of Indian National Congress was district collector in 1857
- Dr. Zakir Hussain, President of India completed his high schooling in Etawah
- C. K. Jain, former Secretary-General was born in Etawah
- Imdad Khan, Sitar and Surbahar player, founder of Etawah Gharana, lived in Etawah
- Mohsin-ul-Mulk, prominent in Aligarh Movement
- Kaptan Singh, born In Etawah
- Akshay Yadav, former MP born In Etawah
- Mulayam Singh Yadav, Former Chief minister of UP
