= Sachin Yadav (Uttar Pradesh politician) =

Indian politician

Sachin Yadav (born 1982) is an Indian politician from Uttar Pradesh. He is a member of the Uttar Pradesh Legislative Assembly from Jasrana Assembly constituency in Firozabad district. He won the 2022 Uttar Pradesh Legislative Assembly election representing the Samajwadi Party.

== Early life and education ==
Yadav is from Jasrana, Firozabad district, Uttar Pradesh. He is the son of Virpal Singh Yadav. He has completed his Bachelor's Degree in Electrical Engineering from Purdue University, USA. He is currently serving as a Member of the General Body of Dr. Bhimrao Ambedkar University, Agra, Member of the Estimate Committee of Uttar Pradesh Vidhan Sabha, and Member of the Technical Educational Council, Uttar Pradesh.

== Career ==
Yadav won from Jasrana Assembly constituency representing Samajwadi Party in the 2022 Uttar Pradesh Legislative Assembly election. He polled 108,289 votes and defeated his nearest rival, Manvendra Lodhi of the Bharatiya Janata Party, by a margin of 836 votes.

He has declared assets worth Rs.29 crore and is the wealthiest among the candidates who contested from Jasrana seat.
