= Prabhu Dayal Katheria =

Indian politician and agriculturist

UP

Personal details
- Born: 22 August 1952 (age 74) Chosingi (Uttar Pradesh)
- Party: Bharatiya Janata Party
- Spouse: Sheetal Kumari
- Children: Six Sons, One Daughter
- Education: Matriculation

Prabhu Dayal Katheria (born 22 August 1952) is an Indian politician and agriculturist. He was former member of parliament from Firozabad.
