= Prempal Singh Dhangar =

Indian politician

Member of the Uttar Pradesh Legislative Assembly
- Constituency: Tundla

Personal details
- Political party: Bharatiya Janata Party

Prempal Singh Dhangar is an Indian politician and member of Uttar Pradesh Legislative Assembly representing the Tundla (SC) Assembly constituency in the Firozabad district. He is a member of the Bharatiya Janata Party.
