= Ganesh Shankar Vidyarthi Memorial Medical College =

Public medical college in Kanpur, India

Coordinates: 26.481099°N 80.307682°E

- Type: Public
- Established: 24 April 1956; 70 years ago
- Academic affiliations: Atal Bihari Vajpayee Medical University (2021–present); Chhatrapati Shahu Ji Maharaj University (1968–2021); University of Lucknow (1956–1968)
- Principal: Dr. Sanjay Kala
- Location: Swaroop Nagar, Kanpur-208002, India, India
- Campus: Urban
- Website: www.gsvmmedicalcollege.com

Ganesh Shankar Vidyarthi Memorial Medical College (GSVMMC or GSVM Medical College) is a public medical college in Kanpur, Uttar Pradesh. The college is named after Ganesh Shankar Vidyarthi, a freedom fighter and journalist from Kanpur. It was founded in 1956.

There is an annual intake of 250 students for the MBBS course, decided by an all-India common entrance examination: NEET-UG.15% of seats come under the all-India quota and 85% of seats come under the state quota.

The institute has an eco-friendly campus with trees and gardens. GSVMMC has a campus with hospital and college sections accommodated in large buildings. The students here identify themselves as Ganeshians and the alumni are called GEMs (GSVM Ex Medicos).

== Affiliated teaching hospitals and research institutes ==
Lala Lajpat Rai Hospital (LLR Hospital), which is also known as Hallet Hospital, is associated with GSVM, Kanpur.

Other associated hospitals are LPS Institute of Cardiology, Rawatpur, JK Cancer Institute, Rawatpur, Murari Lal Chest Hospital Rawatpur and Atal Bihari Vajpayee Postgraduate Institute of Neuro Sciences. LLR Along with its Sister Hospitals forms one of the biggest patient care units of Asia.

- L.L.R. Hospital, established in 1943, and has a total of 1235 hospital beds
- Children Hospital, established in 1957.
- Upper India Sugar Exchange Maternity Hospital, established in 1959
- Dina Nath Parvati Bagla Infectious Disease Hospital, established in 1949
- Dr. Murari Lal Chest Hospital, established in 1969
- Laxmipat Singhania Institute of Cardiology, established in 1975.
- Juggilal Kamlapat Cancer Institute, established in 1961.
- G.S.V.M Super Speciality Post Graduate Institute, established in 2021.

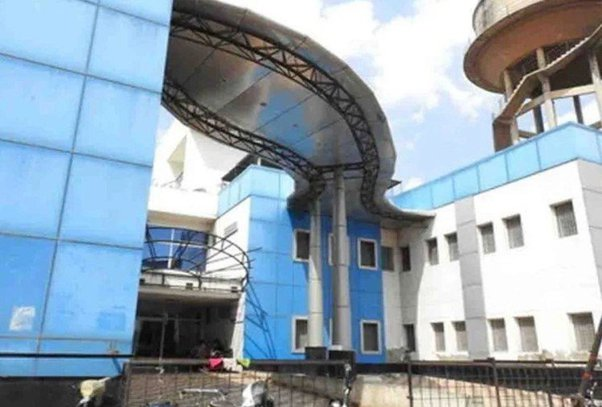
Emergency Block of LLR Hospital, GSVM Medical College

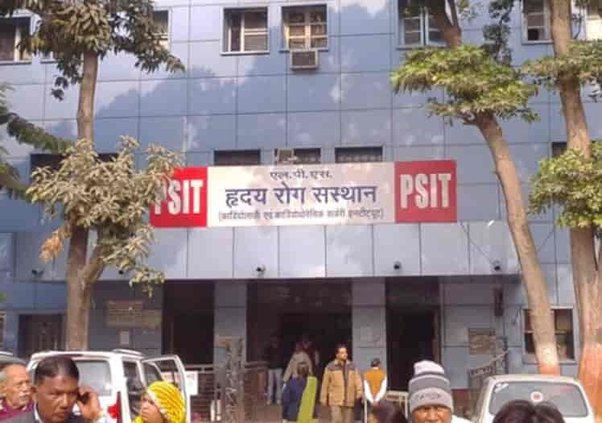
LPS Institute of Cardiology, GSVM Medical College

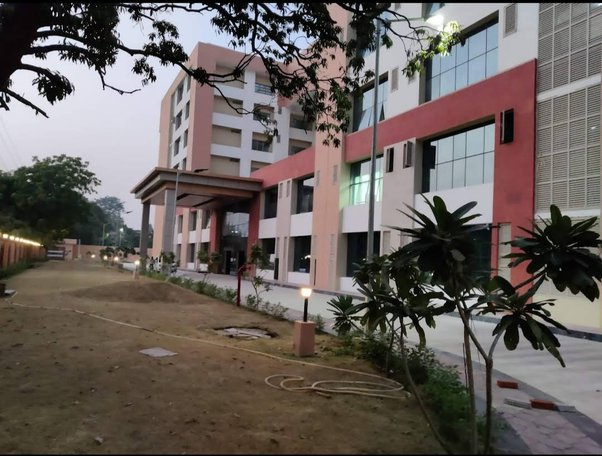
GSVM Super-Speciality PGI

== Affiliations ==
At first the college was affiliated to University of Lucknow. In the year 1968, it got affiliated to newly established Kanpur University (now Chhatrapati Shahu Ji Maharaj University). From 2021, this college is affiliated to the newly built Medical University, ABVMU.

== Campus ==
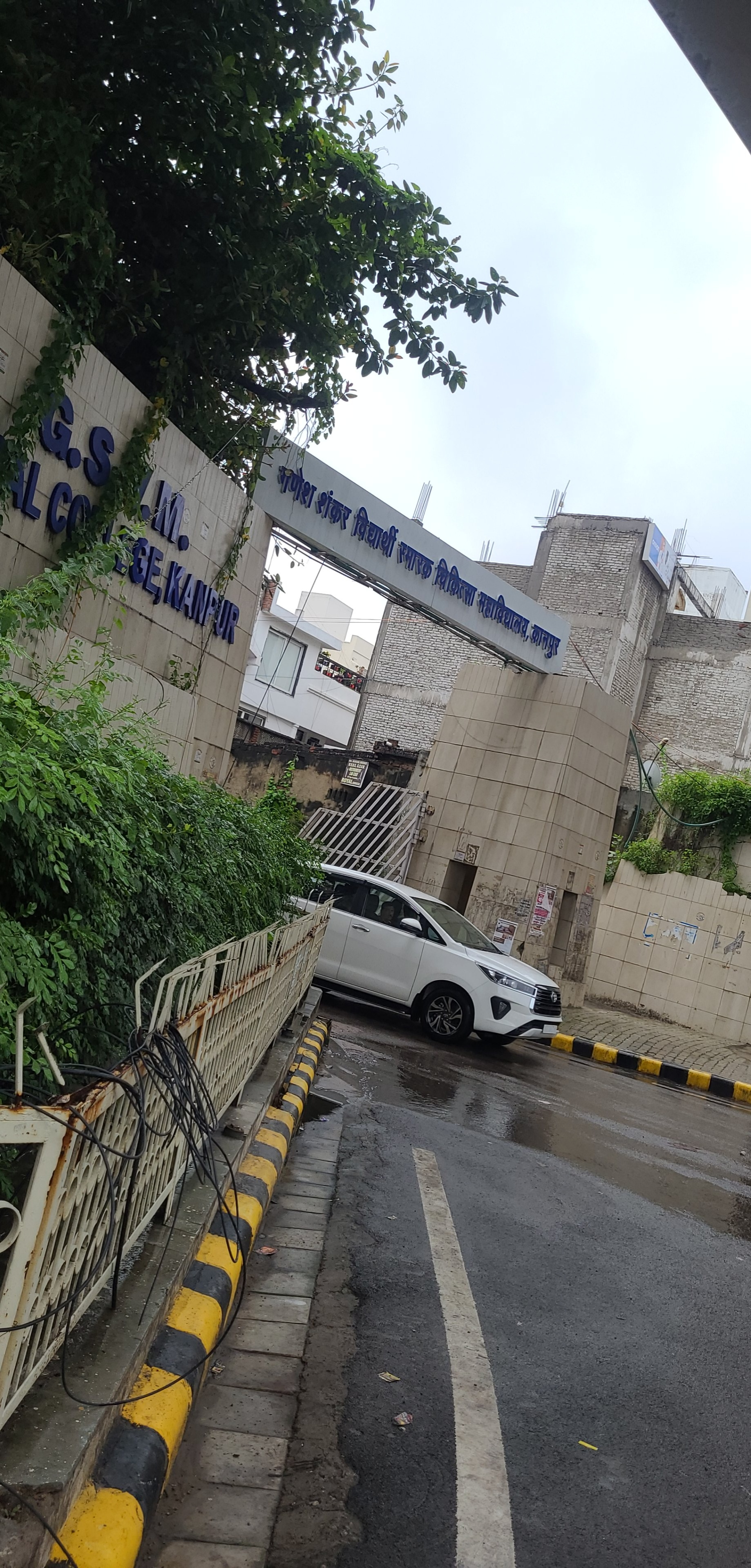
Main Gate, GSVM Medical College

The medical college campus comprises the following.

- Teaching And Administrative Block/Main Building
- Hostels

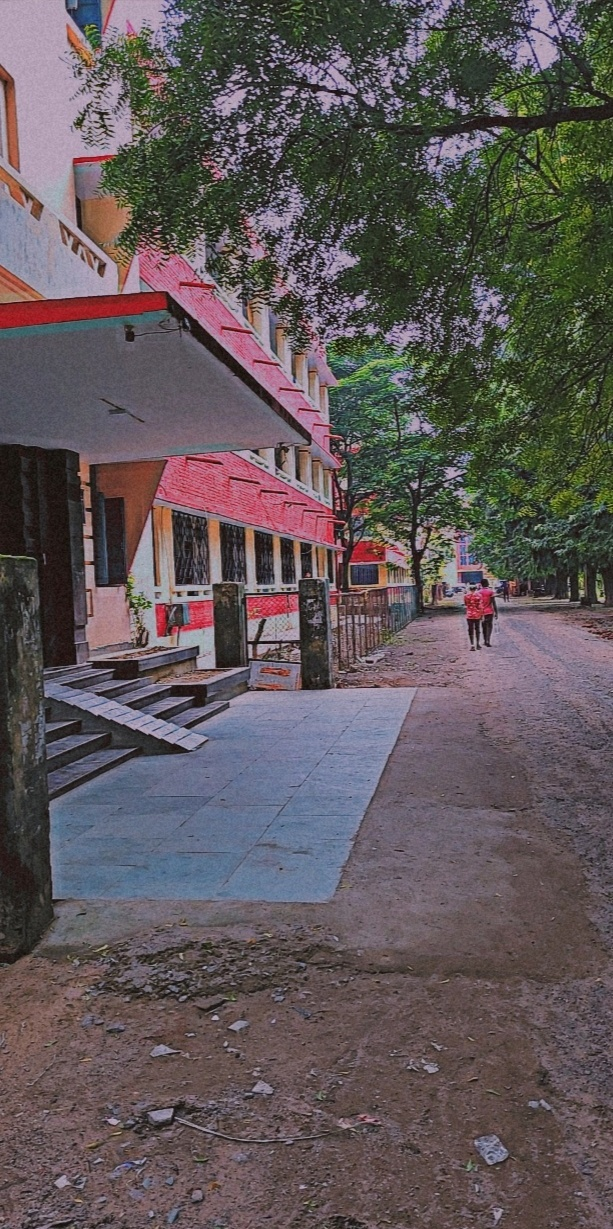
Boys Hostel 1 (BH-1)

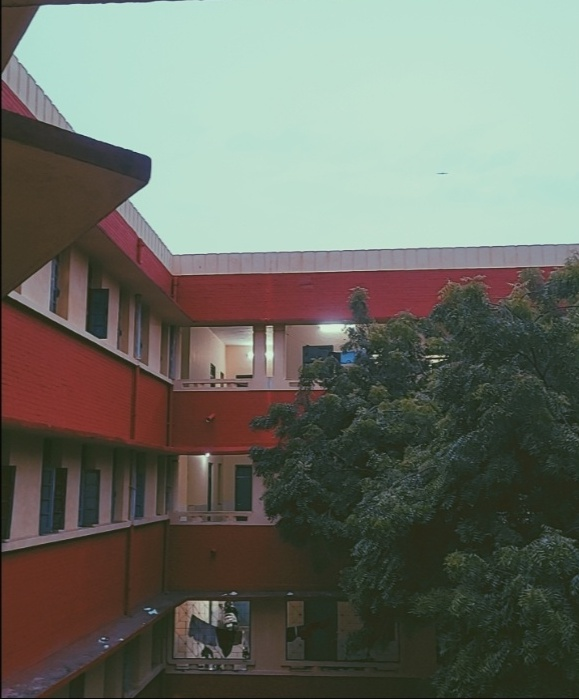
Boys Hostel of GSVM Medical College

1. Boys Hostel No. 1

2. Boys Hostel No. 2

3. Boys Hostel No. 3

4. Boys Hostel No. 4

5. Boys Hostel No. 5

6. U.G. Girls Hostel

7. P.G. Girls Hostel

8. New Resident Hostel

9. Pharmacy Hostel

10. Samaj Kalyan Hostel

- Residential Block, which includes:

1. Principal’s Bungalow

2. P Block- Professors

3. R Block- Associate Professors and Professors

4. L Block, Type 4- All Teachers

5. D Block and Type 3- Teachers, Medical Officers, Demonstrators and Senior Residents

6. C, T and Block 2- Class 3 staff

7. Type 1 Block- Class 4 Staff

- Maintenance Block, which includes:

1. Staff club

2. Post office

3. Animal house

4. Tennis court

5. Swimming pool

6. Sports ground

7. Children school

8. College of Nursing

9. Badminton hall and gymnasium

10. Dept. of Electricity, water supply and sewage

- Gardens and Grounds

== 2014 police incident ==
On 28 February 2014, Samajwadi Party MLA from Sisamau, Irfan Solanki, his driver and official gunner were involved in a minor accident with two doctors of GSVMMC.

The gunner allegedly assaulted the two junior doctors. As more doctors arrived, Solanki and his gunner fled. Later, a large group of Samajwadi Party hoodlums arrived and beat up many students. Following the incident, heavy police force was deployed but was unable to control the growing tension from both sides.

Heavy police force, comprising PAC and RAF, rushed to the spot to control the situation by carrying out a heavy raid on GSVM hostels. The following morning, 1 March 2014, the late night raid carried out by police presented a sordid picture of police high-handedness and the pitched battle waged by junior doctors. Besides violating personal rights and properties of many hostel residents, police destroyed windowpanes and door locks to get into the rooms of residents. The principal of college Navneet Kumar, who was trying to calm the situation down, was misbehaved and insulted. According to Navneet Kumar, among the students who were seriously injured, one of them suffered a pelvic fracture.

As a reaction to the raid, GSVM and Lala Lajpat Rai Hospital went on an indefinite strike in protest against police atrocities. The strike was supported at six other medical colleges in the state. Meanwhile, the IMA announced that its members would remain on strike across the state on 2 March 2014 to protest police action. The strike at the GSVM Hospital, called by the IMA has crippled services in wards at the associated Hallett Hospital.

== Upgradation ==
In August 2014, the Government of India decided to upgrade the institute along with six other medical college hospitals in Uttar Pradesh, as part of phase-3 of Pradhan Mantri Swasthya Suraksha Yojana (PMSSY) whereby the Central Government will bear 80% of the cost of up gradation and 20% cost will be borne by State Government. The upgrading plan started with 12 other Government Medical College/Institutions on 3 August 2016 at the cost of 200 crore (Central Share: Rs. 120 Crore, State share: Rs. 80 crore) each under Phase-IV of Pradhan Mantri Swasthya Suraksha Yojana (PMSSY).

== Notable alumni ==
- Khalid Hameed, Baron Hameed, CBE DL is the Chairman of Alpha Hospital Group, and chairman and chief executive officer of the London International Hospital, Padma Shri in 1992 and the Padma Bhushan, "third in the hierarchy of civilian awards", by the Government of India in 2009
- Harsh Vardhan - Former Union Minister of Health and Family Welfare, Union Minister of Science and Technology, Ministry of Environment, Forest and Climate Change and Ministry of Earth Sciences, former State Minister of Health in 1994 and chairperson of the executive board of the World Health Organization from 22 May 2020
- Manglesh Kumar Srivastava, Mayor of Gorakhpur, Senior Vice-President of the All India Council of Mayors, and pathologist and director of Tilak Pathology
- Satendra Singh - noted disability rights activist and the first Indian to win the prestigious Henry Viscardi Achievement Awards given to extraordinary leaders in the global disability community
- Ashutosh Tewari, Chairman of Urology at the Icahn School of Medicine at Mount Sinai Hospital in New York City
- Raj Kumar, former director of Rajendra Institute of Medical Sciences, founding and former director of AIIMS Rishikesh and former VC of Uttar Pradesh University of Medical Sciences
- Mohsin Wali, Padma Shri awardee
- Ambrish Mithal, Dr. B. C. Roy Award recipient
