= Raj Kumar (professor) =

Founding Director of AIIMS Rishikesh

Doctor Raj Kumar Ph.D., B.Sc., D.Sc., M.B.B.S., M.S., M.R.C.S., F.R.C.S., FASET, F.A.M.S., F.N.S.
- Raj Kumar in April 2018
- Born: 15 December 1959 (age 66); Paman, Kanpur Dehat, India
- Occupations: Sanjay Gandhi Postgraduate Institute of Medical Sciences: Head, Department of Neurosurgery (1993-2015); Chief of Trauma Centre (2015–2018); AIIMS Rishikesh (2012–2015); Uttar Pradesh University of Medical Sciences (2018–2021) Rajendra Institute of Medical Sciences, Ranchi (2024–present)
- Board member of: AIIMS Rishikesh

Academic background
- Education: University of Lucknow

Academic work
- Discipline: Neuroscience, neurosurgery
- Sub-discipline: Pediatric neurosurgery

Raj Kumar (born 15 December 1959) is a Professor of Neurosurgery and Director & CEO of Rajendra Institute of Medical Sciences. He was a founding Director of All India Institute of Medical Sciences, Rishikesh and former Vice-Chancellor of Uttar Pradesh University of Medical Sciences.

== Education and career ==
=== Education ===
He did his B.Sc. from Kanpur University in 1980. After that he joined Ganesh Shankar Vidyarthi Memorial Medical College, Kanpur and completed his M.B.B.S. and M.S. (Master of Surgery) in 1985 and 1990 respectively. He attended All India Institute of Medical Sciences, Delhi and completed his M.Ch. in 1993. Later he did his Ph.D. in Neuro Ayurveda from University of Lucknow in 2013 and was awarded D.Sc. (Honorary) from Uttar Pradesh University of Medical Sciences in 2018. He became a fellow and member of Royal College of Surgeons USA in 2008, fellow of Academy of Sci. Engine. & Techno. in 2010, fellow of National Academy of Medical Sciences in 2013 and fellow of Neurological Society of India in 2015.

=== Career ===
After completing his education he joined Sanjay Gandhi Postgraduate Institute of Medical Sciences of Lucknow as a faculty and later became Professor and Head, Department of Neurosurgery, Sanjay Gandhi Postgraduate Institute of Medical Sciences. In 2012, he joined All India Institute of Medical Sciences, Rishikesh as founding Director. In 2015 he left All India Institute of Medical Sciences, Rishikesh and again joined Sanjay Gandhi Postgraduate Institute of Medical Sciences.

He also served as Chief of Trauma Centre at Sanjay Gandhi Postgraduate Institute of Medical Sciences. In June 2018, he joined Uttar Pradesh University of Medical Sciences of Saifai as vice-chancellor. He was removed from his vice-chancellor post in May 2021 because of his failure in COVID-19 management.

== Books authored ==
Raj has authored many books widely used as textbooks in many colleges across India.

1. Text book of Neurosurgery by B Ramamurthy & PN Tandon (5 chapters)
2. A Text Book of Traumatic Brain Injury by AK Mahapatra, Raj Kumar and R Kamal (co-author)
