= Mohsin Wali =

Indian cardiologist

Dr. Mohsin Wali
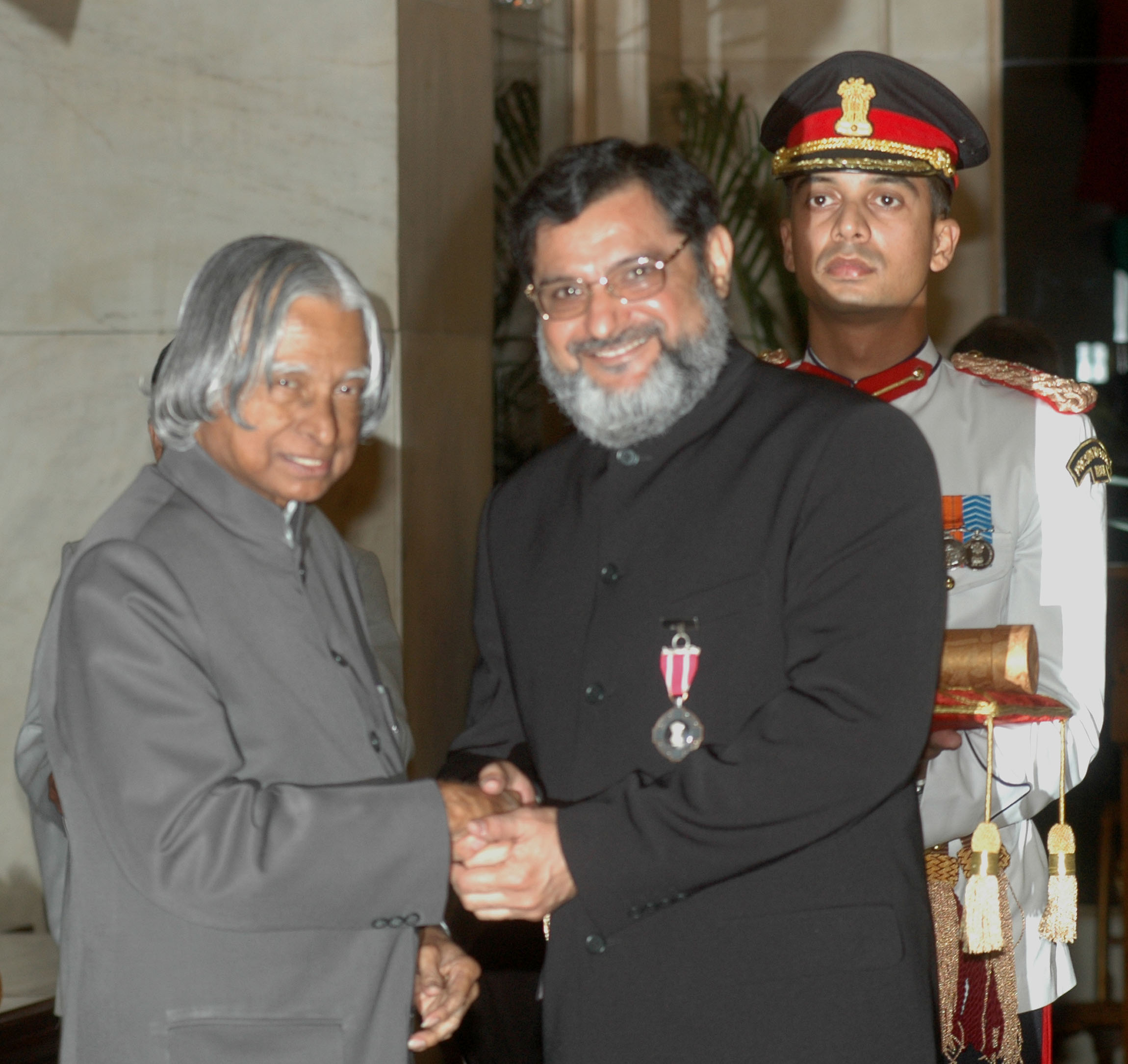
- The President, Rashtrapati Bhavan in New Delhi on March 23, 2007.jpg
- Born: 28 November 1953 (age 72); Bijnor, Uttar Pradesh, India
- Education: Ganesh Shankar Vidyarthi Memorial Medical College, Kanpur University
- Occupation: Cardiologist
- Years active: Since 1970
- Known for: Physician to the President of India
- Spouse: Farrukh Naaz
- Children: Ammar Khan, Sana Khan, Aamir Khan and Asif Khan
- Parent(s): Mehboob Subhani; Alia Wali
- Awards: Padma Shri
- Website: Website

Mohsin Wali is an Indian cardiologist and a former honorary physician to R. Venkataraman and Shankar Dayal Sharma and the serving physician to Pranab Mukherjee. His first assignment as a physician to the President of India was with R. Venkataraman, at the age of 33, making him the youngest physician to serve an Indian President. He is the only physician to have served three Presidents of India. The Government of India awarded him the fourth highest civilian honour of the Padma Shri, in 2007, for his contributions to Indian medicine.

== Biography ==
Mohsin Wali was born in Bijnor, in the Indian state of Uttar Pradesh, to Mehboob Subhani and Alia Wali couple, on 28 November 1953. After graduating in science from Aligarh Muslim University in 1970, he graduated in medicine from Ganesh Shankar Vidyarthi Memorial Medical College and followed it up with a post graduate degree from the Kanpur University in 1979. In 1975, he joined Lala Lajpat Rai Hospital, Kanpur as a resident physician and after one year, he was promoted as a senior registrar and tutor, a post he held till the completion of his post graduation in 1979. He joined GB Pant Hospital in 1980 as a medical officer for a one-year stint and moved to Ram Manohar Lohia Hospital (formerly Willingdon Hospital) in 1981 as a member of faculty and served the institution till 1990, the same year as he was awarded an honorary doctorate by Moscow University. In 2014, he also secured a master's degree on business administration (MBA) in Health Care Services from Sikkim Manipal University.

In 1990, Wali was appointed as the honorary physician to R. Venkataraman, the eighth President of India, at the age of 33, the youngest physician to receive the honour. He also served as an advisor to Surat Medical Trust concurrently. When Shankar Dayal Sharma became the President of India, Wali had a second opportunity to serve an Indian President. He was also the honorary physician to Pranab Mukherjee, the incumbent President, thus becoming the first physician to serve three Indian Presidents, and is a member of the State delegation during Presidential visits. He is a patron of the Accident Relief Society, New Delhi and the Minority Development and Protection Foundation and a nodal officer for Aids Control, under the President's Estate. He is a member of the Maternity and Welfare Division of the Indian Red Cross and a former editorial board member of the Indian Heart Journal. He is a fellow of the International College of Nutrition and a member of the organizations such as New York Academy of Sciences, National Society of Geriatrics, National Society for the Prevention of Blindness and Cardiological Society of India. He is also associated with Qnet, as a member of their Scientific Advisory Board and has contributed chapters to medical texts.

Wali, who is reported to have contributed to the introduction of geriatric medicine in India, is a Fellow of the American College of Cardiology as well as the World Health Organization. The Government of India awarded him the civilian honour of the Padma Shri in 2007.

== Awards ==
- Padma Shri Award in 2007 by the Government of India for his contributions towards Indian medicine

== Personal life ==
Wali is married to Farukh Naaz, who is philanthropist, social worker, and an alumnus of the Aligarh Muslim University, and the couple has three sons and one daughter.
