= Chhatrapati Shahu Ji Maharaj University =

State university in Kanpur, Uttar Pradesh, India

- Former name: Kanpur University
- Motto: IAST: Aaroh Tamso Jyoti
- Motto in English: "From darkness, lead us to light"
- Type: State University
- Established: 9 February 1966 (60 years ago)
- Affiliations: UGC
- Chancellor: Governor of Uttar Pradesh
- Vice-Chancellor: Vinay Kumar Pathak
- Location: Kalyanpur, Kanpur, Uttar Pradesh, India; 26.4983°N 80.2658°E
- Campus: Urban 264 acres
- Website: csjmu.ac.in

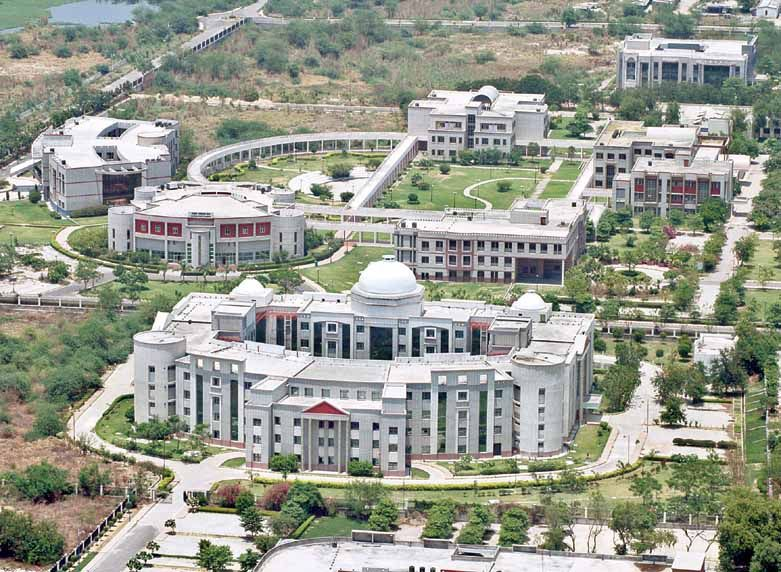
Aerial view of Chhatrapati Shahu Ji Maharaj University Campus

Chhatrapati Shahu Ji Maharaj University (CSJMU), formerly Kanpur University, is a public state collegiate university located in Kanpur, Uttar Pradesh, India. It is administered under the state legislature of the government of Uttar Pradesh.

Auditorium

== Administration ==
The administration is the Chancellor, the Vice-Chancellor and members of the executive council, the court and the academic council of the university.

The Kulpati (Vice-Chancellor) is a whole-time salaried officer of the university and is appointed by the chancellor from amongst the names submitted to him by a committee constituted in accordance with the provisions above U.P. Universities Act 1973.

== Ranking ==
University rankings

Pharmacy – India
- NIRF (2024): 101-125

In 2024, National Institutional Ranking Framework ranked Chhatrapati Shahu Ji Maharaj University among the top 101-125 pharmacy colleges/universities in India.

== Colleges ==
The CSJMU is an affiliating university for all non-engineering, non-medical (including pharmacy), non-MBA degree, non-MCA degree offering colleges of Auraiya district, Etawah district, Farrukhabad district, Kannauj district, Kanpur Dehat district, Kanpur Nagar district and Unnao district from the year of 2020. Notable affiliated colleges include DAV College, Kanpur, Vikramajit Singh Sanatan Dharma College, Christ Church College, Kanpur, Pandit Prithi Nath College, and Chaudhary Charan Singh Post Graduate College.

=== Brahmanand College Kanpur ===
Brahmanand College Kanpur (B N D College) is an affiliated college of the university in Kanpur. It is located on Mall Road near Mare Company pul (originally called Muir Mill Company Bridge) Kanpur, Uttar Pradesh in India. It is a government aided college and affiliated to Chhatrapati Shahu Ji Maharaj University. BND College was established in the year 1961 by Kanyakubja Education Trust. Initially, it was known as 'Kanyakubja College' which was later renamed as Brahmanad College in the memory of its founder Pt. Brahmanand Mishra in the year 1968. Starting with just 49 Students, today the college is providing education to more than 4000 students. Its president is Onkar Nath Awasthi.

Its faculties include Science, Law and Commerce.

=== Formerly affiliated institutions ===
The list of formerly affiliated notable college who now have university status or now affiliated with another university-

- Harcourt Butler Technical University (1968 to 2000)
- Chandra Shekhar Azad University of Agriculture and Technology (1968 to 1975)
- Uttar Pradesh University of Medical Sciences (2006 to 2016)
- Ganesh Shankar Vidyarthi Memorial Medical College (1968 to 2021)

== Departments ==
The university has several departments, including:

=== University Institute of Engineering and Technology ===
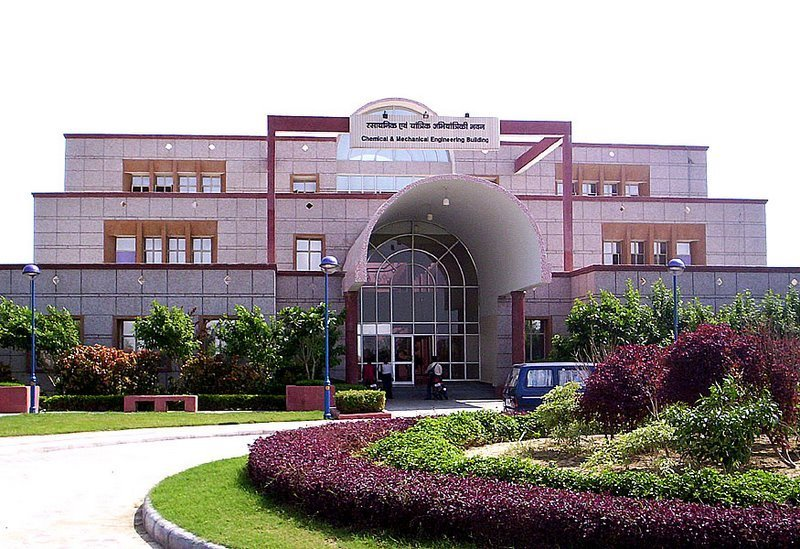
Mechanical Engineering, Chemical Engineering and Chemistry

The University Institute of Engineering and Technology (UIET), also known as the School of Engineering and Technology, is an engineering and technology institute in Kanpur. Founded in 1996 (formerly known as the Institute of Engineering and Technology, Kanpur), it is now a constituent department of CSJMU.

== Notable alumni ==
=== Government and politics ===
- Ram Nath Kovind, 14th President of India
- Harsh Vardhan, ex-Minister of Science and Technology, Environment, Forest and Climate Change and Earth Sciences, attended Ganesh Shankar Vidyarthi Memorial Medical College, graduated in 1979 with a Bachelor of Medicine, Bachelor of Surgery
- Gopal Khanna, 5th director of the Agency for Healthcare Research and Quality
- Shivpal Singh Yadav, MLA and former Cabinet Minister in Uttar Pradesh Government
- Anupriya Patel, MP & former State Minister in Government of India
- Ram Gopal Yadav, MP
- Naresh Uttam Patel, MLC and state president of Samajwadi Party (Uttar Pradesh)
- Lalji Verma, MLA
- Nafees Ahmad, MLA
- Harvindar Kumar Sahani, MLA
- Sarita Bhadauria, MLA
- Adesh Kumar Gupta, state president of Bhartiya Janta Party (Delhi)
- Sone Lal Patel, founder of Apna Dal
- Subhashini Ali, former MP and Polit Beuro member of Communist Party of India (Marxist)
- Annu Tandon, former MP
- Premdas Katheria, former MP
- Sushila Saroj, former MP
- Ashok Kumar Doharey, former MP
- Arvind Pratap, former MLC

=== Academics ===
- Renu Khator, chancellor of the University of Houston System and president of the University of Houston
- Sarvagya Singh Katiyar, former vice-chancellor of Chhatrapati Shahu Ji Maharaj University, Padma Bhushan and Padma Shri.
- Onkar Singh, vice-chancellor of Veer Madho Singh Bhandari Uttarakhand Technical University and founder vice-chancellor of Madan Mohan Malaviya University of Technology
- Raj Kumar, director of Rajendra Institute of Medical Sciences and former vice-chancellor of Uttar Pradesh University of Medical Sciences
- Rakesh Bhatnagar, former vice-chancellor of Banaras Hindu University
- Ghanshyam Swarup, Molecular biologist, Shanti Swarup Bhatnagar laureate
- Hargovind Bhargava, Economist
- O. K. Harsh (Dr. Om Kumar Harsh), former Pro-chancellor (addl), Vice-Chancellor of Glocal University, former Vice-Chancellor of Tantia University, and distinguished alumnus at the University of New England in 2018, International Academic & Research Advisor of Brit College, BCET, London.

=== Others ===
- Mohammad Kaif, cricketer (dropout)
- Anny Divya, pilot, attended Indira Gandhi Rashtriya Uran Akademi, graduated with a Bachelor of Science in Aviation
- Veena Sahasrabuddhe, vocalist and composer of Hindustani classical music
- Rahul Mishra, won the International Woolmark Prize in 2014 at Milan Fashion Week

== See also ==
- Faculty of Pharmacy, Uttar Pradesh University of Medical Sciences
- Mahatma Jyotiba Phule Rohilkhand University
