= Ambrish Mithal =

Indian endocrinologist

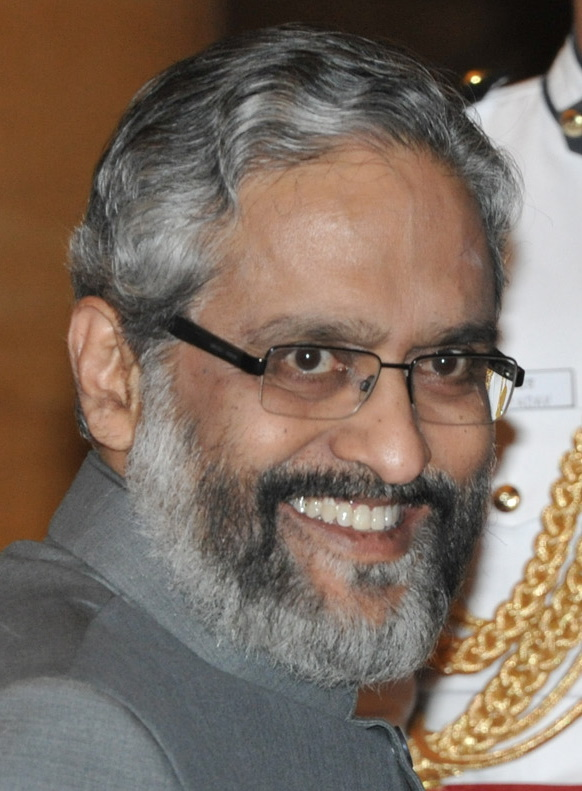
- Mithal in 2015
- Born: 29 March 1958 (age 68); Lucknow, India
- Education: GSVM Medical College
- Occupations: Endocrinologist; Diabetologist
- Years active: 27
- Known for: Endocrinology
- Awards: Padma Bhushan; Dr. B. C. Roy Award
- Website: web site

Ambrish Mithal is an Indian endocrinologist and diabetologist. He secured MBBS from GSVM Medical College, master's degree (DM) from the All India Institute of Medical Sciences, New Delhi. Then he worked at Sanjay Gandhi Post Graduate Institute of Medical Sciences, Lucknow and, later, at Apollo Hospitals, New Delhi before joining Medanta the Medicity as Chairman, Division of Endocrinology and Diabetes where he worked from 2009 to 2019. Subsequently, he joined Max Health Care where he is the chairman and head of Endocrinology and Diabetes department.

Mithal, who has published a number of articles in the field of endocrinology in journals, was honoured by the Government of India in 2015 with Padma Bhushan, the third highest Indian civilian award, for his outstanding contribution to the field of medicine. In September 2020, Mithal became the first Indian to be chosen for the Laureate Award for International Excellence in Endocrinology (2021) by the Endocrine Society (US). Mithal was awarded the International Osteoporosis Foundation President's award in March 2016. In March 2017, Mithal was awarded the Dr. B. C. Roy Award by the President of India (for the year 2015) for his contribution to the development of endocrinology in India. He is also a recipient of the Fogarty Fellowship of Harvard Medical School (1992–93), JICA fellowship (1996), Boy Frame Award of the American Society for Bone and Mineral Research (2004), IOF Amgen Health Professionals Award (2005) and the Indian Medical Association Academy of Medical Sciences Award (2007). He is also a fellow of the American Society for Bone and Mineral Research.

== Selected articles ==
- Mithal, Ambrish; Dharmalingam, Mala; Tewari, Neeraj (2014). "Are patients with primary hypothyroidism in India receiving appropriate thyroxine replacement? An observational study". Indian Journal of Endocrinology and Metabolism. 18 (1): 83–88. doi:10.4103/2230-8210.126582. PMC 3968739. PMID 24701435.
- Gupta, Nitin; Farooqui, KhalidJ; Batra, ChandarM; Marwaha, RamanK; Mithal, Ambrish (2017). "Effect of oral versus intramuscular Vitamin D replacement in apparently healthy adults with Vitamin D deficiency". Indian Journal of Endocrinology and Metabolism. 21 (1): 131–136. doi:10.4103/2230-8210.196007. PMC 5240054. PMID 28217512.
- Yedla, Niharika; Kuchay, MohammadShafi; Mithal, Ambrish (2015). "Hemoglobin E disease and glycosylated hemoglobin". Indian Journal of Endocrinology and Metabolism. 19 (5): 683–685. doi:10.4103/2230-8210.163211. PMC 4566355. PMID 26425484.
- Bano, Tarannum; Mishra, SunilKumar; Kuchay, MohammadShafi; Mehta, Yatin; Trehan, Naresh; Sharma, Pooja; Singh, ManishKumar; Mithal, Ambrish (2019). "Continuation of metformin till night before surgery and lactate levels in patients undergoing coronary artery bypass graft surgery". Indian Journal of Endocrinology and Metabolism. 23 (4): 416–421. doi:10.4103/ijem.IJEM_114_19. PMC 6844171. PMID 31741899.
- Marwaha, Raman K.; Garg, M. K.; Mithal, A.; Gupta, Sushil; Shukla, Manoj; Chadha, Aditi (30 December 2023). "Effect of Vitamin D Supplementation on Bone Turnover Markers in Children and Adolescents from North India". Indian Journal of Endocrinology and Metabolism. 23 (1): 27–34. doi:10.4103/ijem.IJEM_149_18. PMC 6446672. PMID 31016149.
- Kaur, Parjeet; Mahendru, Shama; Mithal, Ambrish (2016). "Long-term efficacy of liraglutide in Indian patients with Type 2 diabetes in a real-world setting". Indian Journal of Endocrinology and Metabolism. 20 (5): 595–599. doi:10.4103/2230-8210.183825. PMC 5040036. PMID 27730066.
- Kuchay, Mohammad Shafi; Mithal, Ambrish (30 December 2023). "Levosulpiride and Serum Prolactin Levels". Indian Journal of Endocrinology and Metabolism. 21 (2): 355–358. doi:10.4103/ijem.IJEM_555_16. PMC 5367242. PMID 28459037.
- Wasir, JasjeetS; Mithal, Ambrish; Agarwal, Paras; Mittal, Apeksha (2018). "Once weekly dulaglutide therapy in type 2 diabetic subjects, real-world evidence from a tertiary care diabetes center in India". Indian Journal of Endocrinology and Metabolism. 22 (6): 728–734. doi:10.4103/ijem.IJEM_424_18. PMC 6330857. PMID 30766809.
- Gill, Harmandeep Kaur; Kaur, Parjeet; Mahendru, Shama; Mithal, Ambrish (30 December 2023). "Adverse Effect Profile and Effectiveness of Sodium Glucose Co-transporter 2 Inhibitors (SGLT2i) - A Prospective Real-world Setting Study". Indian Journal of Endocrinology and Metabolism. 23 (1): 50–55. doi:10.4103/ijem.IJEM_566_18. PMC 6446693. PMID 31016153.
- Dutta, Aditya; Mahendru, Shama; Sharma, Rutuja; Singh, Anshu; Jain, Anjali; Jevalikar, Ganesh; Mithal, Ambrish (30 December 2023). "Video Consultation Versus In-Person Clinic Visit for Glycemic Control in Type 2 Diabetes during COVID-19 Pandemic (VIP-CD Study)". Indian Journal of Endocrinology and Metabolism. 25 (5): 427–431. doi:10.4103/ijem.ijem_347_21. PMC 8923318. PMID 35300446.

== See also ==
- Endocrinology
- Diabetology
