= Tallamraju Prabhakar =

Tallamraju Prabhakar V.S.M.
- Born: 20 July 1947 (age 78); India
- Education: Andhra Medical College; Armed Forces Medical College; Pune University; All India Institute of Medical Sciences, New Delhi
- Awards: Vishisht Seva Medal; Rashtriya Saraswati Vidya Puraskar; Yash Bharti Award

Tallamraju Prabhakar or T. Prabhakar (born 20 July 1947) is a retired Deputy Director General of Indian Armed Forces Medical Services and a professor of Anaesthesia. He was first Vice-Chancellor of Uttar Pradesh University of Medical Sciences.

== Education and career ==
In 1971, he obtained his MBBS from Andhra Medical College of the Andhra University and joined Indian Armed Forces medical services in 1972. He obtained a MD in Anaesthesia from AFMC, Pune University. After that he did his super specialization(PDCC) in Neuro‐Anaesthesia from All India Institute of Medical Sciences Delhi. In 2006, he retired as Deputy Director General of Indian Armed Forces Medical Services and served as Director of U.P. Rural Institute of Medical Sciences and Research from 2006 to 2011. In 2011, he joined Era's Lucknow Medical College, Lucknow as Principal, Dean, Chief Medical Superintendent & Professor of anaesthesia. He was also Professor of Anaesthesia in Pune, Delhi & Kanpur Universities. In August 2014, he left Era's Lucknow Medical College, Lucknow and again become Director of U.P. Rural Institute of Medical Sciences and Research. In 2016 he became Vice-Chancellor of Uttar Pradesh University of Medical Sciences.

He also had the privilege of treating and giving Anaesthesia to A. P. J. Abdul Kalam when he was the President of India.

== Honors ==
- Vishisht Seva Medal (VSM) by the President of India in Year 2000 for his distinguished services for saving lives and limbs of Gaisal Train Accident victims.
- Rashtriya Saraswati Vidya Puraskar by the Governor of Kerala.
- Yash Bharti Award by the Government of Uttar Pradesh in year 2016.
