= Rajan Saxena =

Rajan Saxena may refer to:

- Rajan Saxena (management academic)
- Rajan Saxena (physician)
