= Ramakant Yadav =

Ramakant Yadav may refer to:

- Ramakant Yadav (politician) (born 1957), Indian politician
- Ramakant Yadav (neurologist), (born 1968) professor of neurology
