= Amita Aggarwal =

Indian clinical immunologist (born 1960)

- Born: 1960 (age 65–66); India
- Education: AIIMS, New Delhi; SGPGI, Lucknow; Royal Melbourne Hospital; University of Oklahoma Health Sciences Center
- Known for: Studies in autoimmune rheumatic diseases
- Spouse: Rakesh Aggarwal
- Awards: 2001 ICMR Dr. Kamala Menon Award; 2004 N-BIOS Prize
- Scientific career
- Fields: Clinical immunology; Rheumatology
- Institutions: SGPGI, Lucknow, India

Amita Aggarwal (born 1960) is an Indian clinical immunologist, rheumatologist and a Professor. She is currently the Executive Director at All India Institute of Medical Sciences, Bibinagar. She is the former head at the Department of Clinical Immunology and Rheumatology of the Sanjay Gandhi Postgraduate Institute of Medical Sciences, Lucknow. Known for her studies in autoimmune rheumatic diseases, Aggarwal is a recipient of the Shakuntala Amir Chand Award of the Indian Council of Medical Research and an elected fellow of the National Academy of Sciences, India, National Academy of Medical Sciences and the National Academy of Medical Sciences. The Department of Biotechnology of the Government of India awarded her the National Bioscience Award for Career Development, one of the highest Indian science awards, for her contributions to biosciences in 2004.

== Early life & education ==
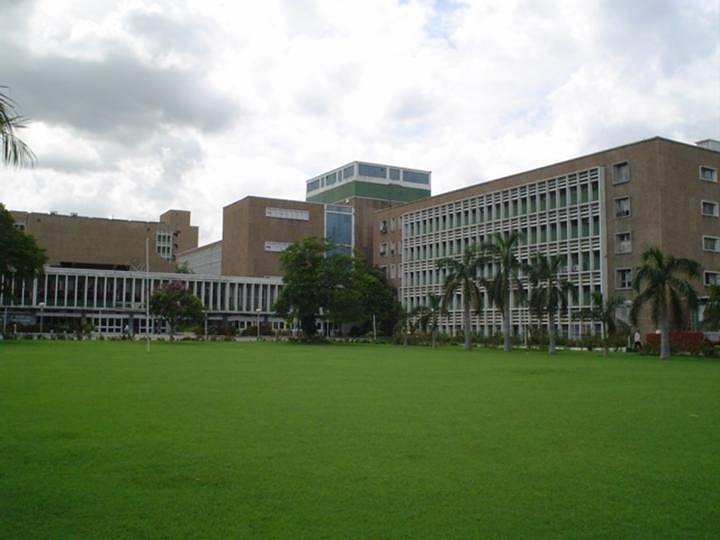
AIIMS Delhi

Amita Aggarwal, born in 1960, earned her medical degree of MBBS as well as a post-graduate degree (MD in Internal Medicine) from the All India Institute of Medical Sciences, Delhi and secured the degree of DM in Clinical Immunology from Sanjay Gandhi Postgraduate Institute of Medical Sciences (SGPGI).

== Career ==
Amita's career started at SGPGI as a member of faculty in 1996 and she holds the position of a Professor and Head at the Department of Clinical Immunology and Rheumatology. In between, she received advanced training in Rheumatology at the Royal Melbourne Hospital in 1995 on an APLAR fellowship and at the University of Oklahoma Health Science Center on a research associateship from the Department of Biotechnology. In addition, she has trained at the Centers for Disease Control and Prevention, Atlanta, USA.

== Legacy ==
Aggarwal is known for her research in the field of autoimmune rheumatic diseases, especially the pathogenesis of Juvenile Idiopathic Arthritis (JIA). She described that the phenotype of JIA in Indian patients is different from that elsewhere and that enthesitis-related arthritis (ERA) is the most common. She has contributed significantly to understanding the pathogenesis of ERA, such as the role of macrophages and T cells, various cytokines and gut microbiome. Besides JIA, she has made seminal contributions in the area of nephritis in patients with systemic lupus erythematosus (SLE). She is currently coordinating a multi-institutional network project on SLE to understand the diversity of SLE across India.

She has contributed immensely to developing manpower for Rheumatology by training nearly 100 students who are now spread across India. She has been holding a National Workshop on Autoantibodies to train Indian physicians in the laboratory diagnostics of autoimmune diseases. She heads the regional diagnostic centre of the Foundation for Primary Immunodeficiency Diseases (FPID), an international organization established to combat primary immunodeficiencies (PID). She is one of the resource persons for PID facilities in India. She has held the office of the President of the Indian Rheumatology Association. She was also the national coordinator for India of the Paediatric Rheumatology International Trials Organization.

== Awards and honors ==
Aggarwal received the Shakuntala Amir Chand Prize of the Indian Council of Medical Research in 1998, for her studies in auto-immune rheumatic diseases and the ICMR honoured her again in 2001 with the Dr. Kamala Menon Award. The Department of Biotechnology of the Government of India awarded her the National Bioscience Award for Career Development, one of the highest Indian science awards in 2004. The award orations delivered by her include the Zydus Oration of the Indian Association of Rheumatology (2002), Dr. Coelho Memorial Lecturer (2005) of the Association of Physicians of India and the Kshanika Oration (2005) of ICMR. The National Academy of Sciences, India elected her as a fellow in 2013 and she received the elected fellowship of the National Academy of Medical Sciences in 2014.

== Selected bibliography ==
- https://www.ncbi.nlm.nih.gov/myncbi/amita.aggarwal.1/bibliography/public/
- Bhattacharya, Shruti; Misra, Ramnath; Aggarwal, Amita (15 January 2020). "Patients with enthesitis-related arthritis show similar monocyte dysfunction pattern as seen in adult axial spondyloarthropathy". Ped Rheumatol. 18 (1): 6. doi:10.1186/s12969-020-0403-9. PMC 6964050. PMID 31941549.
- Bhattacharya, S; Yadav, A; Aggarwal, A (8 February 2019). "Evidence for M2 macrophage activation in patients with enthesitis-related arthritis category of juvenile idiopathic arthritis". Clin Rheumatol. 38 (6): 1715–1719. doi:10.1007/s10067-018-04408-x. PMID 30734215. S2CID 59615997.
- Zanwar, A; Phatak, A; Aggarwal, A (1 December 2018). "Prospective validation of the Juvenile Spondyloarthritis Disease Activity Index (JSpADA) in children with enthesitis-related arthritis". Clin Rheumatol. 57 (12): 2167–2171. doi:10.1093/rheumatology/key246. PMID 30107576. S2CID 52006552.
- Aggarwal, A; Gupta, R; Negi, V; Rajasekhar, L; Misra, R; Chaturvedi, P; Sinha, S (1 May 2017). "Urinary haptoglobin, alpha-1 anti-chymotrypsin and retinol-binding protein identified by proteomics as potential biomarkers for lupus nephritis". Clin Exp Immunol. 188 (2): 254–262. doi:10.1111/cei.12930. PMC 5383437. PMID 28120479.
- Aggarwal, A; Sarangi, AN; Gaur, P (1 March 2017). "Gut microbiome in children with enthesitis-related arthritis in a developing country, and the effect of probiotic administration". Clin Exp Immunol. 187 (3): 480–489. doi:10.1111/cei.12900. PMC 5290238. PMID 27861762.
- Gaur, P; Myles, A; Misra, R; Aggarwal, A (1 February 2017). "Intermediate monocytes are increased in enthesitis-related arthritis category of juvenile idiopathic arthritis". Clin Exp Immunol. 187 (2): 234–241. doi:10.1111/cei.12880. PMC 5217887. PMID 27706807.

== See also ==
- Systemic-onset juvenile idiopathic arthritis
- Genetic polymorphism
