= Sunil Pradhan =

Indian neurologist

Dr Sunil Pradhan
- Born: 25 June 1957 (age 69); Najibabad, Uttar Pradesh, India
- Occupation: Neurologist
- Awards: Padma Shri; Shanti Swarup Bhatnagar Prize; Dr. B. C. Roy Award; Uttar Pradesh Vigyan Ratna; Dr. H. B. Dingley Memorial Award; Shakuntala Amirchand Memorial Award; Rajib Goyal Award; Amrut Modi Unichem Award; Maj Gen. Amir Chand Award; Dr. S. T. Achar Award; Best Poster Paper Award; Best Paper Award; Vocational Excellence Prize
- Website: Official web site

Dr Sunil Pradhan (born 25 June 1957) is an Indian neurologist, medical researcher and writer, known for the invention of two electrophysiological techniques. He has also described five medical signs, of which one related to Duchenne muscular dystrophy is known as Pradhan Sign, and the others associated with facioscapulohumeral muscular dystrophy (FSHD) and similar neuro diseases. The Government of India awarded him the Padma Shri, the fourth highest civilian award, in 2014 for his contributions to the field of neuroscience.

== Biography ==
Dr. Pradhan's extensive clinical research in the area of muscular dystrophy has led to the discovery of five new clinical signs, each indicative of a specific type of the disease. Sanjay Gandhi Post Graduate Institute of Medical Sciences circular.

Pradhan was born in the hill station of Najibabad, Bijnaur District, in the Indian state of Uttar Pradesh, on 25 June 1957. He did schooling at many local schools in Jhansi, Aligarh, Banda, Allahabad and Lucknow and, choosing medical profession, he graduated in medicine, MB BS, from the King George's Medical University, Lucknow, in 1979 and did his post graduate studies in Internal Medicine (MD) there, which he completed in 1983. He did further specialization in neurology and secured the degree of DM.

Dr Pradhan started his career at Jaslok Hospital, Mumbai and later, shifted to the National Institute of Mental Health and Neurosciences (NIMHANS), Bangalore. After a further move to the Nizam's Institute of Medical Sciences, Hyderabad, in 1989, he joined the faculty of the Sanjay Gandhi Post Graduate Institute of Medical Sciences, Lucknow, and worked there till 2007, in various capacities. The next move was to the Institute of Human Behaviour and Allied Sciences (IHBAS) as the Head of the Department of Neurology and works there now as the Medical Superintendent since 2008.

Pradhan brought about many changes at the IHBAS. He was instrumental in updating and elaborating the signage, displays and boards and constructing patient shelters. The electrophysiology Lab was started where he arranged for the setting up of modern equipment like 32 Channels Polysomnography, Nicolet 32 Channels digital Portable Electroencephalography and Electromyography.

Pradhan lives in Lucknow, along the Rae Bareilly Road, in Uttar Pradesh.

== Legacy ==
The legacy of Pradhan centres primarily around the five medical signs he has discovered, the two electrophysiological techniques he has invented and his research findings on the neuro diseases of Japanese Encephalitis, Hirayama type monomelic amyotrophy and epilepsy.

=== Medical signs ===
Pradhan sign or Valley sign: The first of the signs he discovered is related to Duchenne muscular dystrophy (DMD). He discovered that the DMD patients tend to suffer visible enlargement of the infraspinatus and deltoid muscles, which when contracted shows partial wastage. Pradhan clarified that this revealed a valley between the two mounts, visible behind the outstretched shoulders and called it valley sign. The sign was evident in patients with little calf muscle enlargement and visibly positive in DMD cases with 90% sensitivity. The sign was later renamed as Pradhan Sign, on recommendation from the American Academy of Pediatrics.

Poly hill sign: Poly Hill Sign, the second of the signs Pradhan discovered related to facioscapulohumeral muscular dystrophy(FSHD). Pradhan noticed that the shoulder abduction of a patient with external rotation resulted in the formation of six bulges on the back of the shoulders and arms and named it poly hill due to the bulges. He has also reported of an extra hill in one of the cases he attended to.

Shank sign: The third sign, Shank Sign, is related to myotonic dystrophy type 1 (DM-1). When patients suffering from the disease abduct their arms to 90 degrees, a tapering of the upper arm musculature is observed when examined from behind, due to wasting of the biceps, triceps and forearm muscles. This gives a visual resemblance of the shanks of an animal. This sign had an occurrence on 78% of the patients examined by Dr. Pradhan.

Calf-head sign: miyoshi myopathy patients, when they raise their arms with shoulders abducted and elbows flexed to 90 degrees, returned a visual similar to a calf head trophy, on magnetic resonance imaging. The test returned positive on 10 of the 15 patients examined by Dr. Pradhan.

Diamond on quadriceps sign: The sign is related to dysferlinopathy. A clinical study of 31 patients revealed that the patients with the disease developed a diamond shaped bulge on the upper half of the anterolateral aspect of thighs when they stand with knees slightly bent, thereby putting pressure on the quadriceps muscles. The bulge did not appear when the patients were sitting or standing. MRI images confirmed focal bulging out of muscles. The occurrence is observed on 66% of the patients.

=== Electrophysiological techniques ===
Pradhan is credited with two new techniques related to electrophysiology.

The first technique is related to the non-invasive study of intercostal nerves. The technique is reported to have been included in a text book published from the US, calling it as Pradhan Method. The technique advises surface stimulation of the intercostal skin while using specific sites of the rectus abdominis muscle for surface recording. This helps in early detection of the symptoms in patients with Guillain–Barré syndrome. It is also used in the diagnosis of diabetic thoraco abdominal neuropathy.

The second technique involves stimulating the intercostal nerves to study the somatosensory evoked potentials, for localizing the non compressive spinal cord lesions.

Pradhan was successful in elucidating the mechanisms of neurophysiological F‑response generation in healthy and diseased bodies and discovered a phenomenon, F-response multiplicity, a symptom of the lower motor neuron disorder. Pradhan asserted, by way of his findings, loss of early components and scattering of late components are responsible for the different F-response parameters in the lower neuron disorders. He has also demonstrated standardized variables of contraction enhanced H‑reflex called R‑1 response and its utility in nerve root lesions where H-reflex is not electable. This was ratified by many researchers.

=== Research on Japanese Encephalitis ===
Pradhan found out that the Japanese‑B encephalitis (JE) sometimes produced selective lesions on the substrata nigra and this observation has assisted in eliciting a clue in explaining the early onset of Parkinson's disease. This was ratified by Japanese scientists with the help of an animal model of the disease using rats. His findings led to a new clinical entity called Parainfectious conus myelitis, thus drawing an explanation for the unexplained urinary symptoms in young patients. He is credited with the discovery of the role of immunoglobins in acute disseminated encephalomyelitis, a finding confirmed by many other researchers.

=== Research on Epilepsy ===
Pradhan has done extensive research on epilepsy. His studies revealed that patients are likely to suffer from chronic epileptogenesis with poor seizure outcome if gliosis is present around their lesions. He averred that the patients with neurocysticercosis are prone to developing perilesional gliosis, may develop drug resistance during anti‑epileptic drug (AED) therapy and may suffer seizures if the drug is stopped. He has also explained tickling seizures and micturition induced reflex epilepsy, both reported to be first time findings.

=== Research on Hirayama type Monomelic Amyotrophy ===
Pradhan has done research on Hirayama type monomelic amyotrophy, a disease described by Dr. Hirayama in 1959. In 1977, he published a report explaining the features of diagnostic magnetic resonance imaging. Since the diagnosis of the disease remains primarily clinical, it has been reported that Dr. Pradhan's findings provide the only objective diagnostic method. In 2003, Dr. Hirayama published a study that supported and confirmed these findings.

=== Other studies ===
Pradhan is also credited with other findings such as:

- If the process is of long duration, patients may develop central pontine myelinolysis, irrespective of whether the correction of hyponatremia is kept slow.
- Explanation of the sheathing of the retinal vessels in Tuberous Sclerosis.
- Description of MRI and other features of acute endosulphan poisoning and its similarities with the MRI features of Huntington's disease and suggested neurotoxic mechanism by blocking mitochondrial energy metabolism.
- Description of a new method for extracting lipid from muscle tissues for NMR studies.
- Description of micturition induced reflex epilepsy.
- Classification of acute transverse myelitis.

== Awards and recognitions ==
The Government of India, in 2014, honoured Dr. Sunil Pradhan, by awarding him the civilian honour of Padma Shri. He has received many other awards such as:

- Shanti Swarup Bhatnagar Prize - Council for Scientific and Industrial Research - Government of India - 2002
- Dr. B. C. Roy Award - Medical Council of India - 2003
- Uttar Pradesh Vigyan Ratna - Council of Science and Technology - Government of Uttar Pradesh - 2003-04
- Dr. H. B. Dingley Memorial Award - Indian Council of Medical Research - 1994 and 1996
- Shakuntala Amirchand Memorial Award - Indian Council of Medical Research - 1999
- Rajib Goyal Award - Kurukshetra University - Haryana - 2003
- Amrut Modi Unichem Award - Indian Council for Medical Research (ICMR) - 2007
- Maj Gen. Amir Chand Award - Armed Forces Medical College, Pune - 1998
- Dr. S. T. Achar Award - Indian Academy of Pediatrics - 1995
- Dr. S. T Achar Award - Indian Academy of Pediatrics - 1996
- Best Poster Paper Award - Indian Academy of Neurology - 1993
- Best Paper Award - Indian College of Radiology - 1999
- Vocational Excellence Prize - Rotary International - 2002
- Elected fellowship - National Academy of Medical Sciences (2006)

== Sunil pardhan_007 ==
Pradhan has published several research papers in peer-reviewed journals, both national and international in circulation. A random selection of his articles features:

- Levac, Danielle; Espy, Deborah; Fox, Emily; Pradhan, Sujata; Deutsch, Judith E. (1 March 2015). "'Kinect-ing' With Clinicians: A Knowledge Translation Resource to Support Decision Making About Video Game Use in Rehabilitation". Physical Therapy. 95 (3): 426–440. doi:10.2522/ptj.20130618. PMC 4348717. PMID 25256741.
- Snoussi, Karim; Gillen, Joseph S.; Horska, Alena; Puts, Nicolaas A. J.; Pradhan, Subechhya; Edden, Richard A. E.; Barker, Peter B. (September 2015). "Comparison of brain gray and white matter macromolecule resonances at 3 and 7 tesla: MRS of Brain Macromolecules at 3T and 7T". Magnetic Resonance in Medicine. 74 (3): 607–613. doi:10.1002/mrm.25468. PMC 4369478. PMID 25252131.
- Pradhan, Sunil; Kumar, Ajit (2014). "Lower motor neuron paralysis with extensive cord atrophy in parainfectious acute transverse myelitis". Annals of Indian Academy of Neurology. 17 (3): 347–8. doi:10.4103/0972-2327.138525. PMC 4162027. PMID 25221410.
- Pradhan, Sunil K.; Kamble, Nitin M.; Pillai, Aravind S.; Gaikwad, Satish S.; Khulape, Sagar A.; Reddy, M.R.; Mohan, C. Madhan; Kataria, Jag Mohan; Dey, Sohini (December 2014). "Recombinant nucleocapsid protein based single serum dilution ELISA for the detection of antibodies to infectious bronchitis virus in poultry". Journal of Virological Methods. 209: 1–6. doi:10.1016/j.jviromet.2014.08.015. PMID 25173423.
- Pradhan, S (June 2004). "Valley sign in Becker muscular dystrophy and outliers of Duchenne and Becker muscular dystrophy". Neurology India. 52 (2): 203–5. PMID 15269471.

The National Center for Biotechnology Information of the United States National Library of Medicine has published the abstracts of over 750 papers published by Dr. Pradhan. Nanojamians, a blog providing information on technological advancement in neuro sciences, has also listed many of his papers.

== Controversy ==
It was around 12 noon on Monday when the judge came to the OPD and asked to be seen by me. As is the normal procedure, I requested that the case should first go to a resident doctor for preparation of a medical case sheet. But he insisted to be seen by me only. He carried no medical file with him. Also, no doctor had referred him to me. Anyway, I called him in. As I was busy seeing a patient, I could only offer a chair to the lady accompanying the judge. I did not have more chairs to offer to the judge. He, however, left, Dr. Pradhan said about the incident.

On 9 October 2006, Dr. Pradhan received a court summons from the Lucknow bench of the Allahabad High Court, on charges of contempt of court for allegedly ignoring a sitting judge of Allahabad High Court, to present himself before the judge the next day. Dr. Pradhan appeared before the judge at his chamber, along with the Advocate General and the Additional Advocate General of Uttar Pradesh and was asked to tender a written apology, which included an assurance not to repeat the mistake in future. He duly did so and was released without a sentence. Reports about the incident appeared in the media, and drew comments from the public and the law circles. The comments of the judge, however, was not reported.

Later, acting on the news report, the Governor of Uttar Pradesh, T. V. Rajeswar, ordered an enquiry into the incident. The Principal Secretary to the Governor contacted Sanjay Gandhi Post Graduate Institute of Medical Sciences and asked for a report from the management of the institute. Dr. Pradhan's statement was recorded and a report was submitted to the Governor. The details about the action taken are not known.
