= Sita Naik =

Dr Sita Naik is a medical professional and educator, Immunologist who retired as the Professor and Head of the Department of Clinical Immunology at Sanjay Gandhi Postgraduate Institute of Medical Sciences. She was formerly a member of the Governing Body of the Medical Council of India and continues to write on the medical education policy of India.
