= Sarvagya Singh Katiyar =

Indian scientist (1935–2018)

- Born: 1935; British India
- Died: 9 October 2018 (aged 82–83)
- Occupation: Scientist
- Known for: Enzymology
- Awards: Padma Bhushan; Padma Shri; Acharya P. C. Ray Memorial Medal; Professor B. N. Ghosh Memorial Award; Soka University Award of Highest Honor; New Millennium Plaque of Honour; Vigyan Gaurav Award; Excellence in Science Gold Medal; Asutosh Mookherjee Memorial Award; R. C. Mehrotra Memorial Life Time Achievement Award

Sarvagya Singh Katiyar (1935 – 9 October 2018), FRSC, popularly known as S. S. Katiyar, was an Indian scientist specializing in enzymology, and the founder Director of Dr. Ram Manohar Lohia National Law University, Lucknow. He is a former president of the Association of Indian Universities and a former vice chancellor of Chhatrapati Shahu Ji Maharaj University, Kanpur and Chandra Shekhar Azad University of Agriculture and Technology. He was honoured by the Government of India in 2003 with Padma Shri, the fourth highest Indian civilian award, followed by Padma Bhushan, the third highest civilian award, in 2009.

== Biography ==
Sarvagya Singh Katiyar, born in 1935, did his undergraduate (BSc) and master's (MSc) studies at Agra University and secured his PhD in 1962 in chemical kinetics under the guidance of N. A. Ramaiah, an S. S. Bhatnagar Award winner, from the National Sugar Institute, Kanpur. Moving to USA, he did post doctoral research, working with John W. Porter, at the University of Wisconsin–Madison and was successful in determining the kinetic mechanism of the enzyme fatty acid synthetase complex for the first time. He returned to India to join the Indian Institute of Technology, Kanpur where he became the Head of the Chemistry department in 1989 and stayed with the institution till 1994 when he was appointed as the vice chancellor of Kanpur University, present day Chhatrapati Shahu Ji Maharaj University. He held the post till his retirement in 2007 for four consecutive terms, the first vice chancellor to do so in the history of the university.

Katiyar is known to have done extensive research on enzymes and its architecture which is reported to have assisted in understanding the catalytic domain of kinases and dehydrogenases and expanded the usage of enzymes for catalytic reactions for industrial purposes and as diagnostic tools. His researches have been documented by way of over 125 scientific papers published in peer reviewed journals. He has also guided several master's and doctoral students in their studies. The first biochemistry-biotechnology laboratory was established at the Indian Institute of Technology, Kanpur during his tenure as the head of the department there. He is also known to have initiated 50 new courses at Chhatrapati Shahu Ji Maharaj University as its vice chancellor. His contributions are noted behind the establishment of Dr. Ram Manohar Lohia National Law University, Lucknow where he was a founder director and has served as the vice chancellor of Chandra Shekhar Azad University of Agriculture and Technology.

Katiyar is an elected fellow of The World Academy of Sciences, National Academy of Sciences, India, Indian National Science Academy and the New York Academy of Sciences. He is also a fellow of American Institute of Chemists and the Royal Society of Chemistry, UK. He is a former president of the Association of Indian Universities and the Indian Science Congress Association, and he has served the Uttar Pradesh State Council for Higher Education as its chairman. He was a member of the Indian National Science Academy as a member and as an additional member. He is the founder of the Prof. S. S. Katiyar Charitable Society, which has instituted the Prof. S. S. Katiyar Endowment Lecture award under the aegis of the Indian Science Congress Association.

Katiyar, a visiting professor at Tokyo University, received the Acharya P. C. Ray Memorial Medal in 1990 and the Professor B. N. Ghosh Memorial Award in 1995. In 2001, he received the Soka University Award of Highest Honor, and he received three awards in 2003: the New Millennium Plaque of Honour for Chemical Sciences, Vigyan Gaurav Award from the Government of Uttar Pradesh and the national civilian award of Padma Shri from the Government of India. He is also a recipient of Gold Medal for Excellence in Science (2006), the Asutosh Mookherjee Memorial Award (2008) and the R. C. Mehrotra Memorial Life Time Achievement Award (2009). The Government of India honoured him again in 2009 with the Padma Bhushan.

== See also ==
- Chhatrapati Shahu Ji Maharaj University
- Dr. Ram Manohar Lohia National Law University
- Association of Indian Universities
- Indian Science Congress Association
- University Institute of Engineering and Technology, Kanpur
