= RIMS-2, Ranchi =

Proposed super-speciality hospital in Ranchi, Jharkhand

RIMS-2 is a proposed 2,600 bed super-speciality hospital and medical college in Ranchi, Jharkhand, India. The project is being developed by the Government of Jharkhand as an expansion of the Rajendra Institute of Medical Sciences (RIMS).

The proposed hospital is intended to expand the healthcare infrastructure in Jharkhand and reduce patient burden on the existing RIMS campus.

== Controversy ==
The project has faced protests from local residents and tribal groups over land acquisition at the proposed site in Ranchi district.

Several political leaders from Jharkhand, including Babulal Marandi, Champai Soren and Bandhu Tirkey opposed the proposed site and called for relocation of the project.

== See also ==
- Rajendra Institute of Medical Sciences
- Department of Health, Medical Education and Family Welfare, Jharkhand
