= Rakesh Aggarwal (gastroenterologist) =

Indian gastroenterologist

- Born: 1961 (age 64–65); Haryana, India
- Education: AIIMS, New Delhi; PGIMER, Chandigarh; Centers for Disease Control and Prevention; London School of Hygiene and Tropical Medicine
- Known for: Studies on Gastrointestinal and Liver diseases, Viral Hepatitis
- Spouse: Amita Aggarwal
- Awards: 2002 N-BIOS Prize
- Scientific career
- Fields: Gastroenterology; Liver disease; Public health; Vaccinology
- Institutions: Jawaharlal Institute of Postgraduate Medical Education and Research (JIPMER), Pondicherry; Sanjay Gandhi Postgraduate Institute of Medical Sciences (SGPGI), Lucknow

Rakesh Aggarwal (born 1961) is an Indian gastroenterologist, who is currently working as a Professor and Head, Department of Gastroenterology at the Sanjay Gandhi Postgraduate Institute of Medical Sciences (SGPGI), Lucknow, India. He was previously the Director of Jawaharlal Institute of Postgraduate Medical Education & Research (JIPMER), Puducherry, India for 6 years, from 1 January 2019 to 31 December 2024. Known for his studies on Gastrointestinal diseases, Liver diseases, and Viral Hepatitis, Aggarwal is an elected fellow of all the three major Indian science academies, namely National Academy of Sciences, India, the Indian Academy of Sciences and the Indian National Science Academy, and of the National Academy of Medical Sciences. The Department of Biotechnology of the Government of India awarded him the National Bioscience Award for Career Development, one of the highest Indian science awards, for his contributions to biosciences in 2002.

== Biography ==
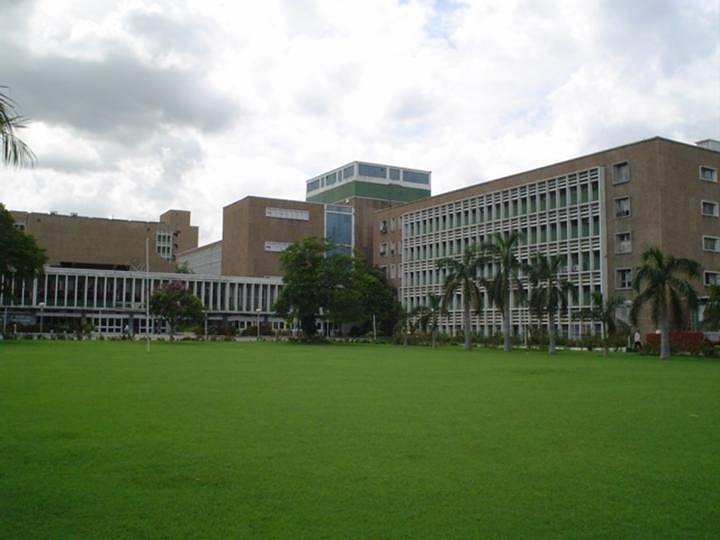
AIIMS Delhi

Rakesh Aggarwal was born in 1961, and spent his childhood in Chandigarh. After obtaining an MBBS degree in 1983 and completing his residency (with MD General Medicine) in 1986 from the All India Institute of Medical Sciences, New Delhi, he joined the Postgraduate Institute of Medical Education and Research, Chandigarh for a fellowship in gastroenterology, obtaining his DM (Gastroenterology) degree in 1989. Thereafter, he joined the Sanjay Gandhi Postgraduate Institute of Medical Sciences, Lucknow (SGPGI) as a faculty member in the department of gastroenterology, where he has held the position of a Professor of Gastroenterology since 2008. In between, he trained at the Centers for Disease Control and Prevention at their hepatitis branch during 1996-1998 doing laboratory research on Hepatitis E, and at the London School of Hygiene and Tropical Medicine from where he obtained a master's degree in epidemiology in 2008.

Aggarwal joined as Director, Jawaharlal Institute of Postgraduate Medical Education & Research (JIPMER) in Pondicherry, India with effect from 1 January 2019, for a five-year term. He left the position on 31 December 2024, after completing his the initial term and a one-year extension period.

== Legacy ==
Aggarwal's work is focused in the fields of gastroenterology and hepatology with special emphasis on viral hepatitis, in particular gepatitis E and hepatitis B, on which he has conducted research from epidemiologic, clinical and laboratory perspectives. He has also contributed to the areas of health economics and immunization. His studies have been documented by way of a number of articles (Note: Please see Selected bibliography section) and ResearchGate, an online repository of scientific articles has listed several of them. Besides, he has mentored several research scholars in their doctoral studies.

Aggarwal has been the principal investigator of several projects funded by various Indian funding agencies. Biomedical Informatics Centers of ICMR was another project managed by him, on sponsorship from the Indian Council of Medical Research. He sits in the Panel of experts on Gastroenterology of the Ministry of Health and Family Welfare as well as the Scientific and Technical Advisory Committee on Viral Hepatitis of the World Health Organization and has conducted several workshops which included the V. S.R. Naik Memorial Workshop on Computers and Informatics in Medicine held in 2008 and the Workshop on Scientific Writing of the Indian Council of Medical Research held in September 2010. He was a member of the experts' panel of SAGE Working Group on Hepatitis E from October 2013 to December 2014 and has also been associated with scientific journals as an editor.

== Awards and honors ==
The Department of Biotechnology of the Government of India awarded him the National Bioscience Award for Career Development, one of the highest Indian science awards in 2002. The National Academy of Sciences, India elected him as a fellow in 2007 and he received the elected fellowships of the Indian Academy of Sciences the same year. The Indian National Academy of Sciences, the third of the major Indian science academies, elected him as a fellow in 2017.

== Selected bibliography ==
- https://www.ncbi.nlm.nih.gov/myncbi/rakesh.aggarwal.1/bibliography/public/
