= Harish Poptani =

- Born: India
- Education: Sanjay Gandhi Postgraduate Institute of Medical Sciences (PhD); University of Lucknow (MS)

Harish Poptani is a University of Liverpool's Professor and Chair of the center for Preclinical Imaging. He did his PhD in Radiology from Sanjay Gandhi Postgraduate Institute of Medical Sciences and MS in Organic Chemistry from University of Lucknow.
