= All India Institute of Medical Sciences, Rishikesh =

Medical institute in Uttarakhand, India

- Motto: Viśvārogya Hi Dharmo Naḥ
- Motto in English: Global Health is the Dharma for Us
- Type: Public
- Established: 2012; 14 years ago
- President: Dr. Raj Bahadur
- Director: Dr. Meenu Singh
- Faculty: 100
- Students: 1,000+
- Postgraduates: 500+
- Location: Rishikesh, Uttarakhand, India; 30.0786773°N 78.285906°E
- Campus: Urban
- Website: aiimsrishikesh.edu.in

All India Institute of Medical Sciences, Rishikesh (AIIMS Rishikesh) is a medical college and hospital based in Rishikesh, Uttarakhand, India. The institute operates autonomously under the Ministry of Health and Family Welfare. It is one of the Institutes of National Importance in India. AIIMS Rishikesh is ranked 14th in India by the National Institutional Ranking Framework (NIRF) medical ranking for 2024.

== History ==
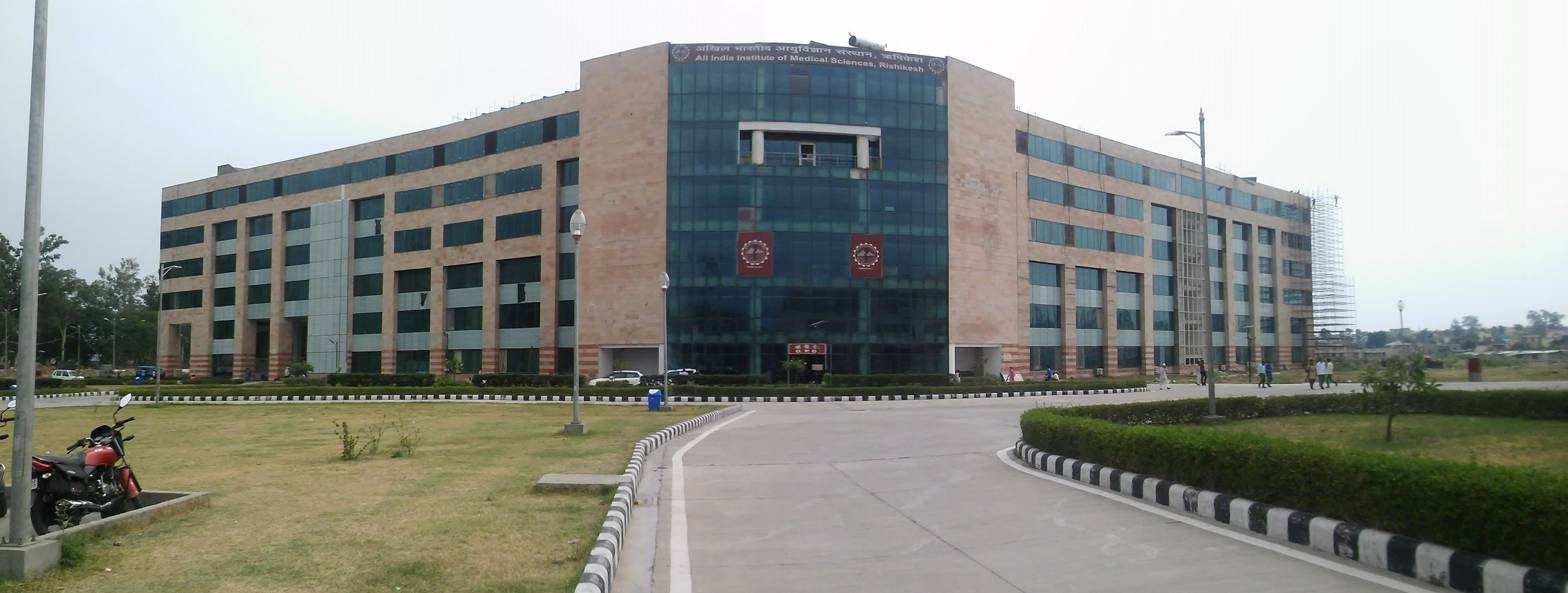
All India Institute of Medical Sciences Rishikesh Campus

While plans for the hospital date to 2004, the center was established in 2012.

== Hospital ==
As of 2019, the hospital had 960 beds, 25 functional modular operating theatres, 17 functional super speciality and 18 speciality functional. AIIMS, Rishikesh operates India's first government heli-ambulance.

== Medical College and Nursing College ==
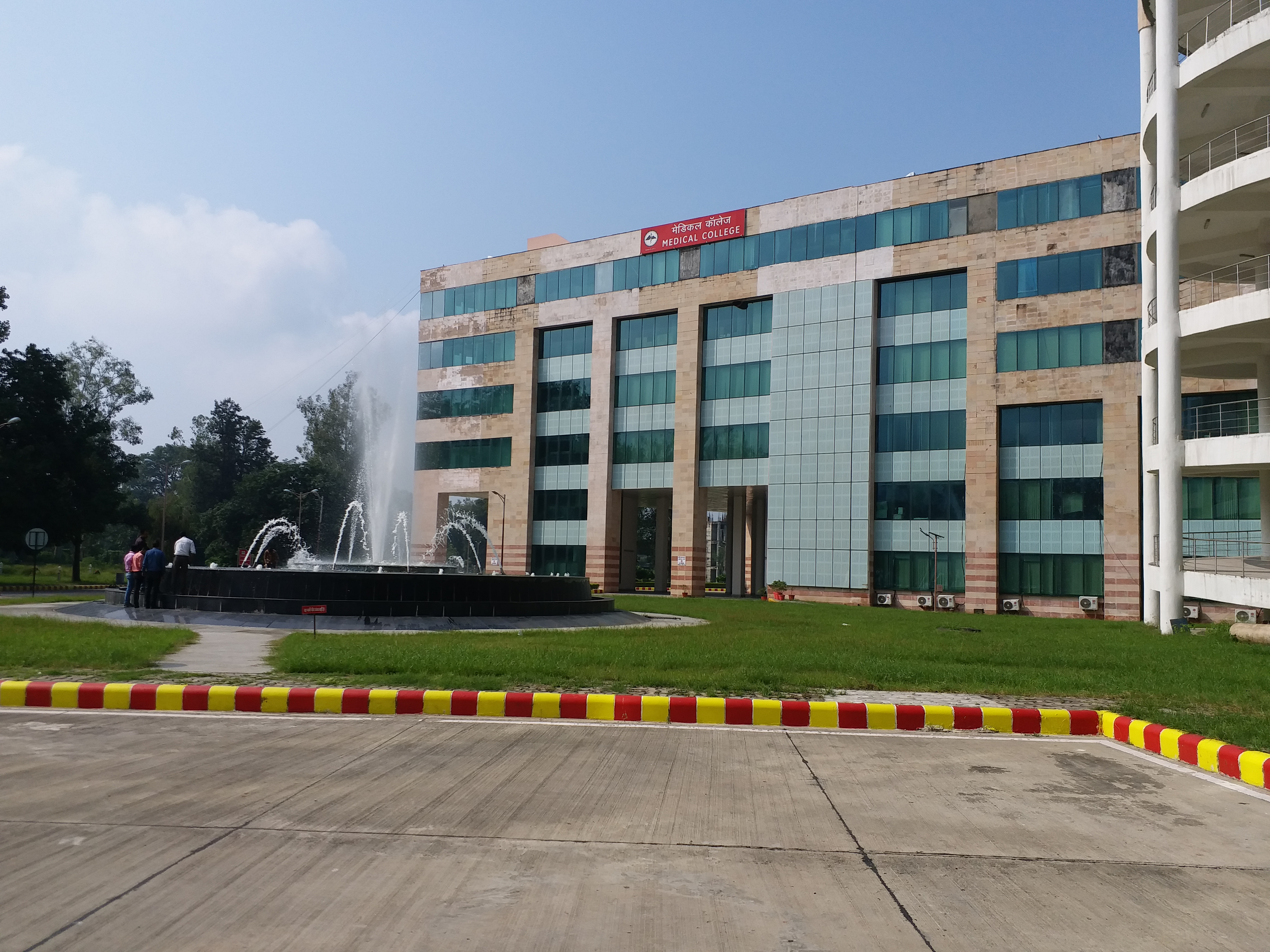
AIIMS Rishikesh, Medical College

AIIMS started its MBBS course with 50 students and now has an intake capacity of 125 students per year from year 2020. Nursing College has an intake of 100 students per year.

== Ranking ==
University and college rankings

Medical – India
- NIRF (2024): 14

== Directors ==
- Raj Kumar (2012–2016)
- Sanjeev Misra (2016–2017)
- Ravi Kant (2017–2021)
- Arvind Rajvanshi (2021–2022) (additional charge)
- Meenu Singh (2022–present)

== See also ==
- All India Institute of Medical Sciences
- Education in India
- List of medical colleges in India
