= Rajan Saxena (physician) =

Indian academic

Rajan Saxena was born in Lucknow and was former Dean and Head of the Department of Surgical Gastroenterology at Sanjay Gandhi Postgraduate Institute of Medical Sciences, Lucknow, a medical institution of national importance in India and Padma Shri (2004) awardee.He is currently working in Apollomedics Hospital Lucknow. He is an alumnus of the Postgraduate Institute of Medical Education and Research, and specialises in hepatobiliary pancreatic and liver transplant surgery.
