= Sanjay Gandhi Postgraduate Institute of Medical Sciences =

Medical institute in Uttar Pradesh, India

- Type: Institute under State Legislature Act
- Established: 1983; 43 years ago
- Accreditation: NABH; NAAC A++
- Affiliations: NMC, AIU
- Endowment: ₹1,160.5 crore (US$120 million) (2024–25)
- President: Chief Secretary, Government of Uttar Pradesh
- Director: Dr. R. K. Dhiman
- Visitor: Governor of Uttar Pradesh
- Academic staff: 291
- Students: 477
- Postgraduates: 386
- Doctoral students: 91
- Location: Lucknow, Uttar Pradesh, India; 26.7463°N 80.9360°E
- Campus: 649.72 acres (262.93 ha); Urban
- Website: sgpgims.org.in
- Government of Uttar Pradesh

Organisation
- Type: Teaching hospital

Services
- Standards: NMC
- Emergency department: Level I Trauma Center
- Beds: 1,582

Helipads
- Helipad: Yes

University and college rankings

Medical – India
- NIRF (2021): 5

Sanjay Gandhi Postgraduate Institute of Medical Sciences (SGPGIMS) is a medical Institute under the State Legislature Act in Lucknow, Uttar Pradesh, 14 km (8.7 miles) south of Hazratganj on Raebareli Road. It was established in 1983 and is named after Sanjay Gandhi. The National Institutional Ranking Framework (NIRF) ranked the institute 5th in its medical ranking 2025.

== Overview ==
The institute is located on 649.72 acres (2.6293 km^{2}) residential campus on Raebareli Road. The institute offers degrees recognised by the National Medical Commission. It provides tertiary-level medical care, teaching, training, and research for specialties. Degrees at the DM, MCh, MD, and Ph.D. levels are offered, along with postdoctoral fellowships and postdoctoral certificate courses in various disciplines. Offers training programs for senior residents. The College of Medical Technology offers B.Sc. courses in nursing and BSc/MSc courses in paramedical technology in allied sciences. The institute is an autonomous institution. The institute functions as a state college is a member of the Association of Indian Universities, and is recognised by the College Grants Commission.

The institute employs over 250 faculty members across 32 departments. Each department consists of teaching, training, patient care, and research. The Director is Professor R.K. Dhiman, and the Dean is Professor S.P. Ambesh.

In 1997, SGPGI was among the first government hospitals in India to implement the Oracle-based HIS system. In 2019 the HIS was updated to be fully integrated with the PAX and telemedicine network.

The UP state government-owned SGPGI hospital is located nearly 1 km (0.62 mi) from the institute.

== Notable people ==
=== Notable alumni ===
- Amita Aggarwal, DM (1993)
- Ashutosh Tewari, MCh (1994)
- Kanneboyina Nagaraju, Ph.D. (1995)
- Harish Poptani, Ph.D. (1995)
- Ramakant Yadav, DM (2006)

=== Notable faculty ===
- Shyam Swarup Agarwal
- Rakesh Aggarwal
- Mahendra Bhandari
- Sita Naik
- Sunil Pradhan
- Rajan Saxena
- Amita Aggarwal
- Nirmal Kumar Gupta

== See also ==
- Atal Bihari Vajpayee Institute of Medical Sciences and Dr. RML Hospital, New Delhi
- Dr. Ram Manohar Lohia Institute of Medical Sciences
- Jawaharlal Institute of Postgraduate Medical Education and Research, Puducherry
- King George's Medical University
- Uttar Pradesh University of Medical Sciences
- National Institute of Mental Health and Neurosciences, Bengaluru
- Postgraduate Institute of Medical Education and Research, Chandigarh
