= O. K. Harsh =

Indian-born Australian scholar

Om Kumar Harsh
- Born: September 12, 1952 (age 73)
- Occupations: Vice-chancellor, scholar

O. K. Harsh (born 12 September 1952) is an Indian-Australian scholar and academician.

He is currently an International Academic and Research Advisor at the Brit College of Engineering and Technology London, United Kingdom, an Advisor at Vikrant University, and Honorary Pro-chancellor at Glocal University, India. Formerly he has served as a vice-chancellor at Glocal University and Tantia University.

== Early life and education ==
He was born on 12 September 1952 in Calcutta but his root belongs to Bikaner. Om Kumar Harsh has academic portfolio with four research degrees, in areas such as Semiconductor, Plasma (physics), electrical engineering and Computer science. He is a distinguished alumnus of the University of New England (Australia).

== Career ==
O. K. Harsh has served as the Vice-chancellor of Tantia University, Rajasthan.

He has about 135 publications to his name and these publications have been cited by hundred of citations.

Dr Harsh has been invited to lecture and keynote at numerous workshops and seminars in India, Australia and overseas.

== Awards and accolades ==
He was awarded the UNE Alumni Award 2018 by the University of New England (Australia).

== Notable publications ==
- "Three dimensional knowledge management and explicit knowledge reuse", 2009, OK Harsh, Journal: Journal of Knowledge Management Practice, Cited by 72
- "Low-energy plasmon K β′ satellite in the K β 1, 3 x-ray emission spectra of Mn, Cr, and their compounds", 1979, KS Srivastava, RL Shrivastava, OK Harsh, V Kumar, Vol:19, Cited by 38
- "A self review and external review model for teaching and assessing novice programmers", 2013, Vol:3, Issue:2, p:120, Cited by 31
- "Mobile devices supported learning for novice programmers", 2013, Sohail Iqbal, Morshed U Chowdhury, Om Kumar Harsh, p:277-282, Cited by 22
- "X-ray K-absorption edge shifts in transition elements", 1979, KS Srivastava, RL Shrivastava, OK Harsh, V Kumar, vol:40, Issue:6, p:489-491, Cited by 17
- "Role of delivery, course design and teacher-student interaction: Observations of adult distance education and traditional on-campus education", 2002, Om Kumar Harsh, M Sadiq Sohail, vol:3, Issue:2, p:1-10, Cited by 16
- "Involvement of free and bound excitons and exciton molecules in transport and recombination in silicon solar cells and related devices, 1997, pub: UNSW, Sydney

== Read more ==
- Interview of "Prof. Om Kumar Harsh"
