= Ramakant Yadav (neurologist) =

Former vice-chancellor of Uttar Pradesh University of Medical Sciences

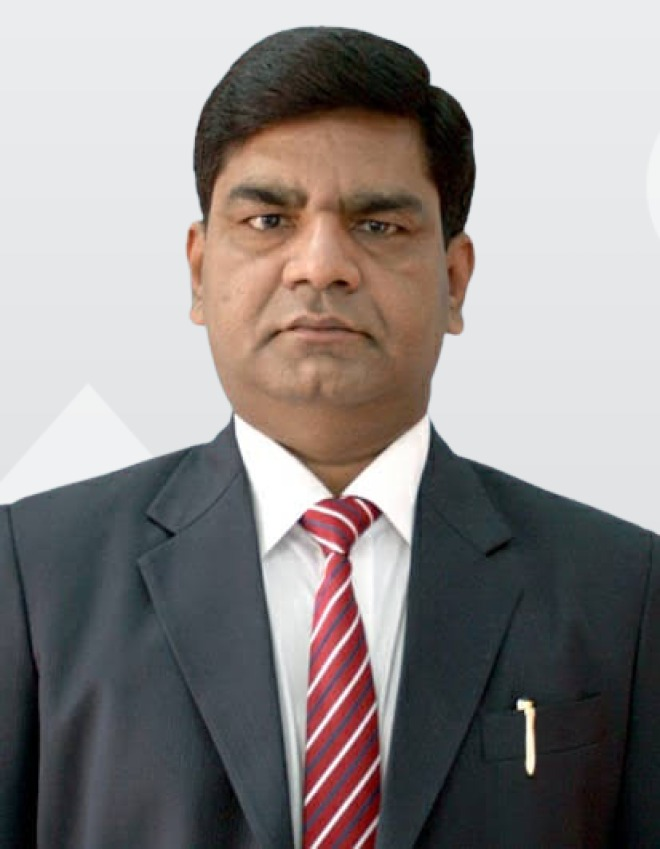
- Born: 11 September 1968 (age 58)
- Title: Professor, doctor
- Awards: Yash Bharti Award (2016)

Academic background
- Education: Sarojini Naidu Medical College; Sanjay Gandhi Postgraduate Institute of Medical Sciences

Academic work
- Institutions: Sanjay Gandhi Postgraduate Institute of Medical Sciences; Uttar Pradesh University of Medical Sciences

Ramakant Yadav (born 11 September 1968) is a professor of Neurology and Yash Bharti Award winner who is working at Uttar Pradesh University of Medical Sciences, Saifai.

== Education and career ==
He completed his M.B.B.S. in 1992 and M.D. (medicine) in 1998 from Sarojini Naidu Medical College, Agra of Agra University (Dr. Bhimrao Ambedkar University), Agra. Later he joined Sanjay Gandhi Postgraduate Institute of Medical Sciences, Lucknow and got D.M. (Neurology) degree in 2006. He became a fellow of Indian Association of Clinical Medicine in 2008. He joined U.P. Rural Institute of Medical Sciences, now known as Uttar Pradesh University of Medical Sciences, Saifai as an assistant professor in 2006 and now working as a professor there. In 2016 he was awarded Yash Bharti Award, the highest civilian award of the state (Uttar Pradesh). In 2020, he became Fellow of the Royal College of Physicians of Edinburgh. In May 2021 he became vice-chancellor of Uttar Pradesh University of Medical Sciences and served as vice-chancellor till January 2022.
