= Faculty of Pharmacy, Uttar Pradesh University of Medical Sciences =

Government pharmacy college in India

- Former name: Pharmacy College Saifai
- Type: Government College
- Established: 2015; 11 years ago
- Academic affiliations: Uttar Pradesh University of Medical Sciences (2016 – present); Dr. A.P.J. Abdul Kalam Technical University (2015–2016)
- Vice-Chancellor: Prof.(Dr.) Ajai Singh
- Dean: Kamla Pathak
- Academic staff: 14
- Students: 217
- Undergraduates: B.Pharm – 217
- Location: Saifai, Etawah district, Uttar Pradesh, India; 26.9627438°N 78.9728644°E
- Campus: Saifai
- Website: Official website

Faculty of Pharmacy, Uttar Pradesh University of Medical Sciences, formerly Pharmacy College Saifai, is a government pharmacy college in Saifai, Etawah district of Uttar Pradesh, established in 2015. It is first grant-in-aid college run by Uttar Pradesh Government offering degree courses in Pharmacy.

== History ==
It started as Pharmacy College Saifai, with the first batch of B Pharm getting enrolled in academic year of 2015–16, for which it was affiliated with Dr. A.P.J. Abdul Kalam Technical University. From academic year 2016–17, it became a constituent college of the newly established Uttar Pradesh University of Medical Sciences. After which it gives admission in B Pharm from university's own entrance exam, named CPNET. Later it was renamed and upgraded as Faculty of Pharmacy. It started M Pharm degree in academic year of 2024–25.

== Ranking ==
University rankings

Pharmacy – India
- NIRF (2023): 101-125
- NIRF (2024): 101-125

In 2023, 2024 and again in 2025, National Institutional Ranking Framework ranked it among top 101-125 Pharmacy colleges/universities in India.
