= Lala Lajpat Rai Hospital =

Coordinates: 26.478583°N 80.311523°E

Geography
- Location: Swaroop Nagar, Kanpur

Organisation
- Type: Public

History
- Founded: 1943

Links
- Other links: List of hospitals in India

Lala Lajpat Rai Hospital is a government hospital in Swaroop Nagar, Kanpur, which was earlier called Hallet Hospital, and its campus stand adjacent to the Moti Jheel lake and is spread across 960 acres.

It is associated with GSVM Medical College, Kanpur.

== History ==
The hospital was named after governor of United Provinces of Agra and Oudh Sir Maurice Hallett.

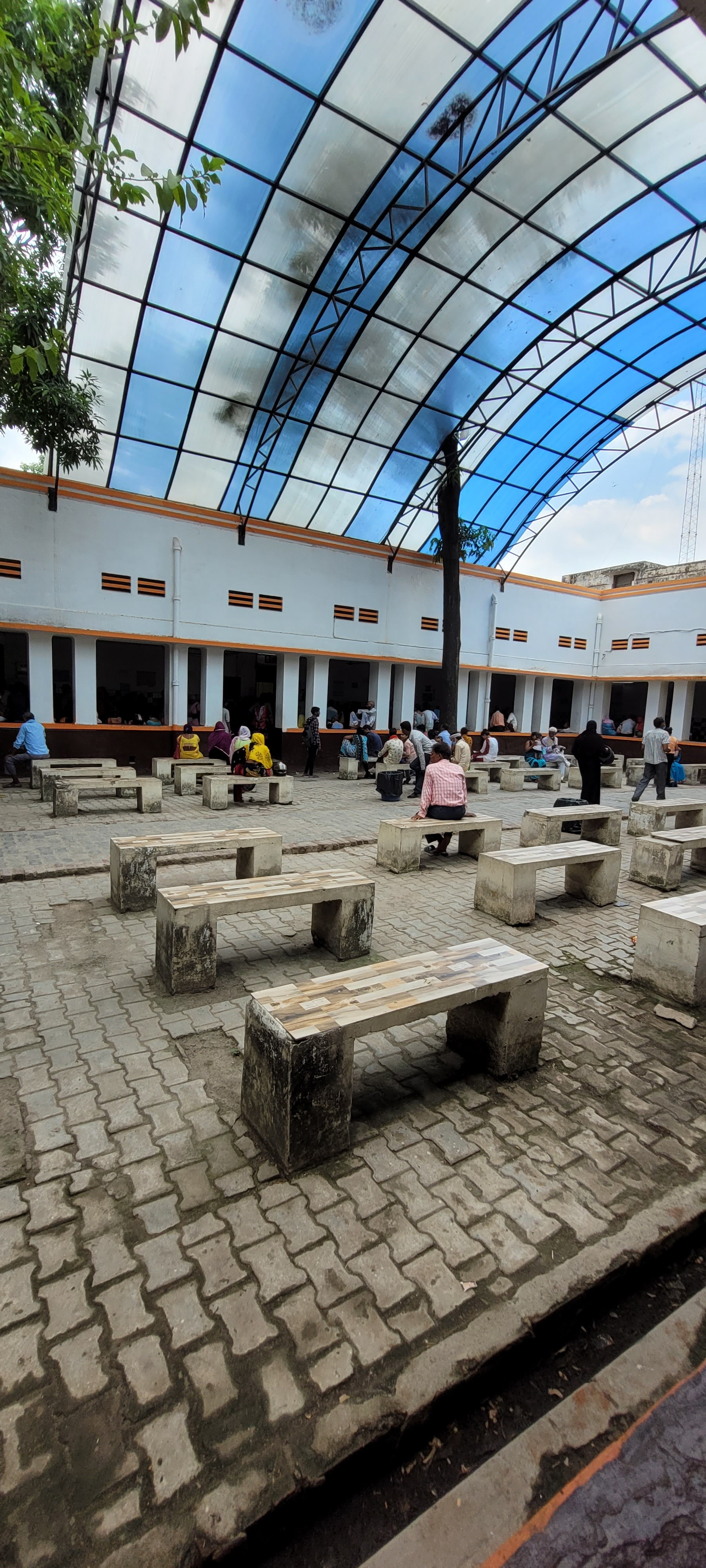
OPD, LLR Hospital

== Facilities ==
The main building of L.L.R. Hospital houses the departments of Medicine; Surgery; Orthopedics; Ophthalmology; Ear, Nose and Throat; Skin and Sexually Transmitted Disease; Radio Diagnosis; Outpatient; Mortuary; Casualty; Emergency Intensive Care Unit (I.C.U.); Medicine I.C.U.; and Burn Unit.

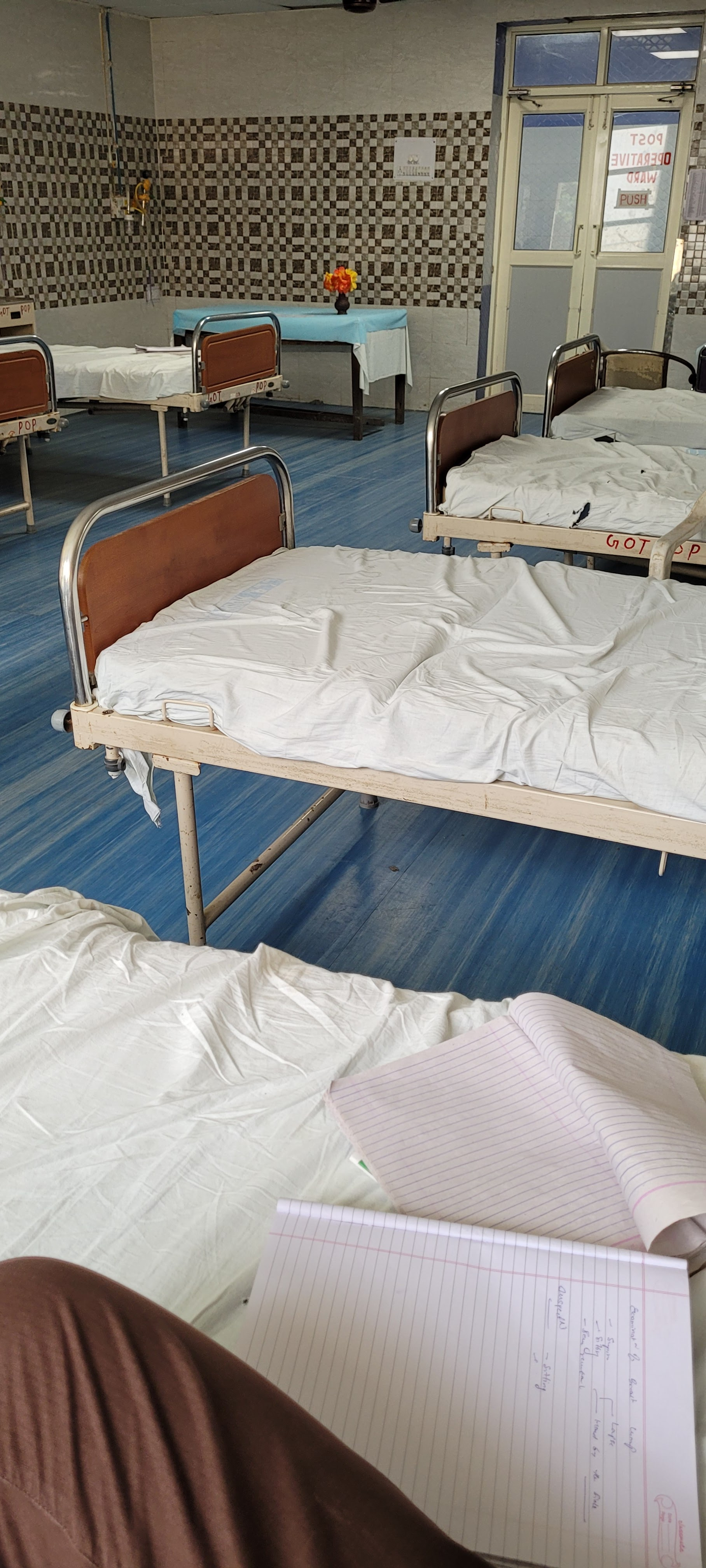
Post-Operative Ward, LLR Hospital
