= Uttar Pradesh University of Medical Sciences =

University in Saifai, Uttar Pradesh

- Former names: U.P. Rural Institute of Medical Sciences and Research (2005–2016)
- Motto: sarve bhavantu sukhinaḥ sarve santu nirāmayāḥ
- Type: State university
- Established: 15 December 2005; 20 years ago
- Affiliations: UGC, NMC, NDC, PCI, INC, NABL
- Chancellor: Chief Minister of Uttar Pradesh
- Vice-Chancellor: Dr. Ajai Singh
- Academic staff: 226
- Total staff: 1636
- Students: 3394 (2020)
- Location: Saifai, Etawah, Uttar Pradesh, India; 26.9608041°N 78.9606463°E
- Campus: Rural
- Colors
- Website: www.upums.ac.in

The Uttar Pradesh University of Medical Sciences, formerly U.P. Rural Institute of Medical Sciences and Research, is a medical school, hospital and medical research public university located at Saifai in the Etawah District of Uttar Pradesh, India. It came into being after the upgrade of UP Rural Institute of Medical Sciences and Research (established in 2005) by Government of Uttar Pradesh under Act 15 of 2016.

== History ==
In 2005, U.P. Rural Institute of Medical Sciences and Research, a state government run medical college affiliated with Chhatrapati Shahu Ji Maharaj University, Kanpur was established in Saifai village, District Etawah, Uttar Pradesh. Medical College, founded in 2005 as U.P. Gramin Ayurvigyan Avam Anusandhan Sansthan (U.P. Rural Institute of Medical Sciences and Research in English). It was affiliated with Chhatrapati Shahu Ji Maharaj University till 2016 with all other constituent colleges except one.It was established by UPRIMS&R, Saifai, Act 2005 notified on 15 December 2005. M.B.B.S. course started in 2006, M.D. course started in 2011, M.S. course started in 2013 and M.D.S. course started in 2014. Paramedical and Nursing Colleges of Institute started in 2012 with diploma and bachelor's degree courses and Pharmacy College started in 2015 with bachelor's degree course. College of Dentistry(postgraduate), started in the year of 2014 with 2 Postgraduate seats. Paramedical Vigyan Mahavidyalaya, proposed in the year of 2006 and started in the year of 2012. College of Nursing, started in the year of 2012. Pharmacy College Saifai, started in the year of 2015. Unlike other colleges, instead of Chhatrapati Shahu Ji Maharaj University, it was affiliated with Uttar Pradesh Technical University (UPTU) for the academic session of 2015–16. It is first grant-in-aid college run by Uttar Pradesh Government offering B.Pharm. degree. After becoming university in 2016 , according to Uttar Pradesh University of Medical Sciences, Saifai, Act 2016 , all constituent colleges became Faculties . i.e. Faculty of Medicine, Faculty of Dental Science, Faculty of Paramedical Science, Faculty of Nursing, Faculty of Pharmacy.

In February 2015, Government of Uttar Pradesh started the process of establishing a university of medical sciences in Saifai, Etawah by upgrading existing U.P. Rural Institute of Medical Sciences and Research. On 4 February 2015, the state assembly passed a bill named "Uttar Pradesh University of Medical Sciences, Saifai, Etawah Bill-2015". On 2 May 2016 the Bill was approved and it became a university on 5 June 2016.

After becoming University, M.Ch. courses started in 2020 and from academic year 2023, university started paramedical master's degree.

In 2024 academic year, university started master's degree in pharmacy with 4 specializations.

== Courses Offered ==
=== Undergraduate Courses ===
- Bachelor of Medicine and Bachelor of Surgery (MBBS)
- Bachelor of Pharmacy (B.Pharm)
- Bachelor of Science (Nursing)
- Bachelor of Medical Laboratory Technology (BMLT)
- Bachelor of Physiotherapy (BPT)
- B.Sc. in Radiological Imaging & Techniques (BRIT)
- Bachelor of Optometry (B.Optm)

=== Postgraduate and Super-speciality Courses. ===
1. MD (Community Medicine)
2. MD (Microbiology)
3. MD (Paediatrics)
4. MD (Pathology)
5. MD (Pharmacology)
6. MD (Physiology)
7. MD (Anaesthesiology)
8. MS (Anatomy)
9. MS (ENT)
10. MS (General Surgery)
11. MS (Ophthalmology)
12. MS (OBG)
13. MS (Orthopaedics)
14. MD (Pulmonary Medicine)
15. MD (Biochemistry)

DNB (General Medicine)

M.Ch. (Neurosurgery)

M.D.S. (Periodontology)

M.Pharm (Pharmaceutics)

M.Pharm (Pharmaceutical Chemistry)

M.Pharm (Pharmacology)

M.Pharm (Pharmacognosy)

MPT (Neurology)

MPT (Orthopaedics)

Master of Optometry

M.M.L.T. (Medical Microbiology)

M.Sc. (Radio Imaging Techniques)

== Ranking ==
University rankings

Pharmacy – India
- NIRF (2023): 101-125
- NIRF (2024): 101-125

It was rlleges in India in 2023 and again in 2024 by NIRF.

It is also one of two Para Medical colleges to get the highest rating of 'A' by the ranking system of the Uttar Pradesh government.

== Facilities ==
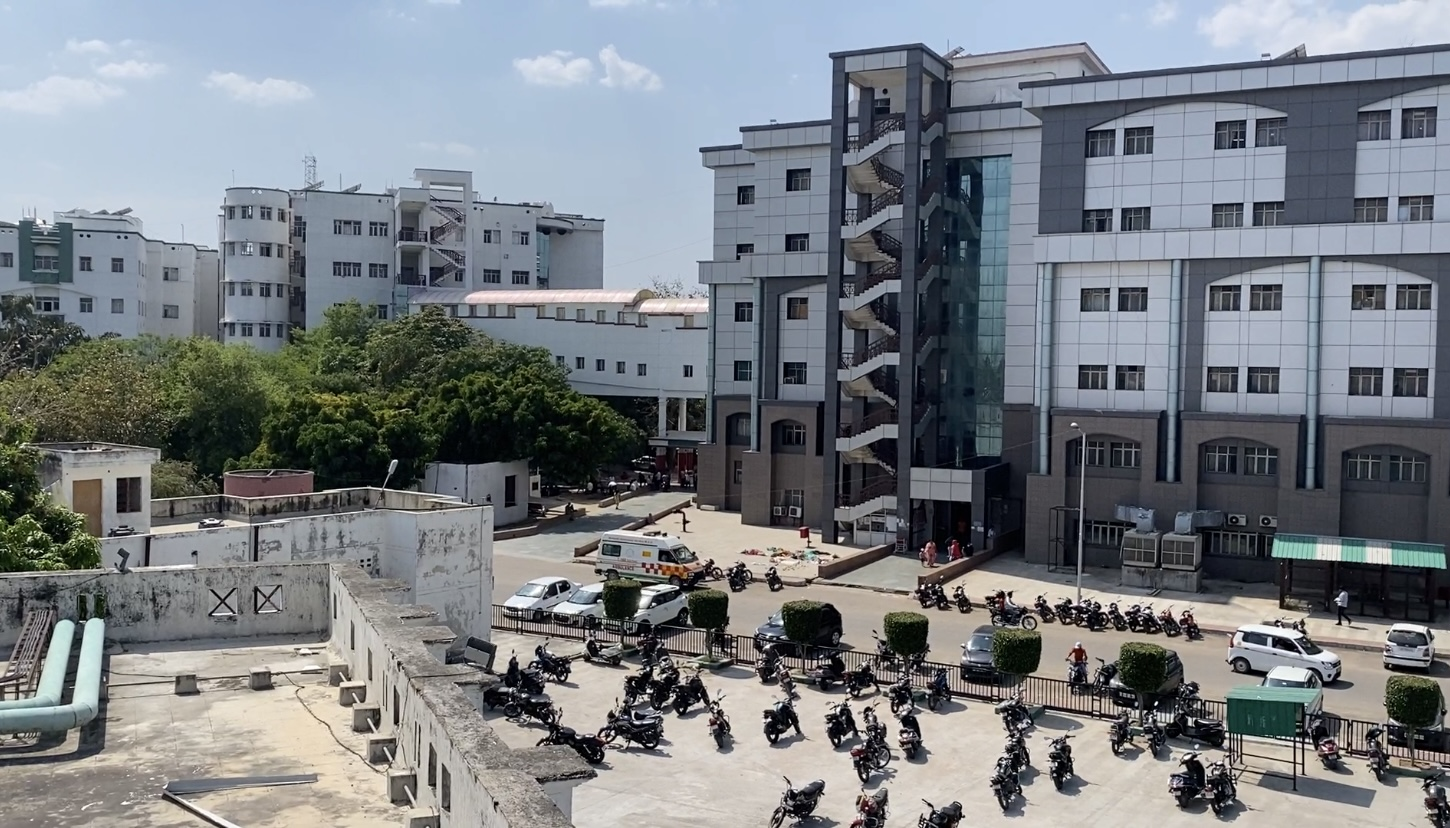
1050 bedded Hospital Complex. Trauma centre not visible.

The university is running a full-fledged Medical College, Dental College (postgraduate), Paramedical College, Nursing College, Pharmacy College, Multi Specialty 1050 bedded hospital, 150 bedded trauma and burn centre and 528 bedded Super Speciality hospital.

300 bedded Obstetrics & Gynaecology and Paediatrics hospital is being established in the university by Government of Uttar Pradesh at a cost of 750 ₹ crores which will be spread across 50 acres of land.

== Collaborations ==
- Indian Institute of Technology Kanpur for promotion and clinical trials of non-invasive medical devices. It also involves enhancing mentoring, training and research quality, allowing startups and innovators to utilise shared resources, sharing research infrastructure and expertise and collectively participating in crucial healthcare projects on both national as well as international levels.

== Vice-chancellors ==
- Ajai Singh (5 August 2025 – present)
- Pankaj Kumar Jain (6 December 2024 – 4 August 2025)
- Prabhat Kumar Singh (19 January 2022 – 5 December 2024)
- Ramakant Yadav (10 May 2021 - 18 January 2022)
- Raj Kumar (1 June 2018 - 9 May 2021)
- Brig. T. Prabhakar (12 July 2016 - 31 May 2018)

== Faculties ==
- Faculty of Medicine
- Faculty of Dental Sciences
- Faculty of Nursing
- Faculty of Paramedical Sciences
- Faculty of Pharmacy

== Multidisciplinary Research Unit ==
As of 2021, it has one of 80 Multidisciplinary Research Unit (MRU) established by the Central Government of India in various Government Medical Colleges. It is mandated to undertake research primarily in Non-Communicable Diseases.
