= Rajendra Institute of Medical Sciences =

Medical school in Ranchi, India

- Other name: RIMS
- Former names: Ranchi Medical College and Hospital (1960–63); Rajendra Medical College and Hospital (1963–2002)
- Motto: सर्वे सन्तु निरामयाः (Sanskrit) sarve santu nirāmayāḥ (ISO)
- Motto in English: May no one suffer from illness
- Type: Government medical school
- Established: 1960; 66 years ago
- Affiliations: National Medical Commission
- Academic affiliations: Ranchi University
- Director: Dr. Dipendra Kumar Sinha
- Students: 365
- Location: Ranchi, Jharkhand, India; 23°23′29″N 85°20′54″E
- Campus: 216 acres (87 ha); Urban
- Website: rimsranchi.ac.in

The Rajendra Institute of Medical Sciences (RIMS), formerly Rajendra Medical College and Hospital, is a medical school located in Ranchi, capital of the state of Jharkhand, India. It was established in 1960. The college is an autonomous body established under an act of Jharkhand Assembly.

The institute provides free medical service along with medicines. Developments in the field of surgery include minimal access cosmetically sound (MACS) surgery.

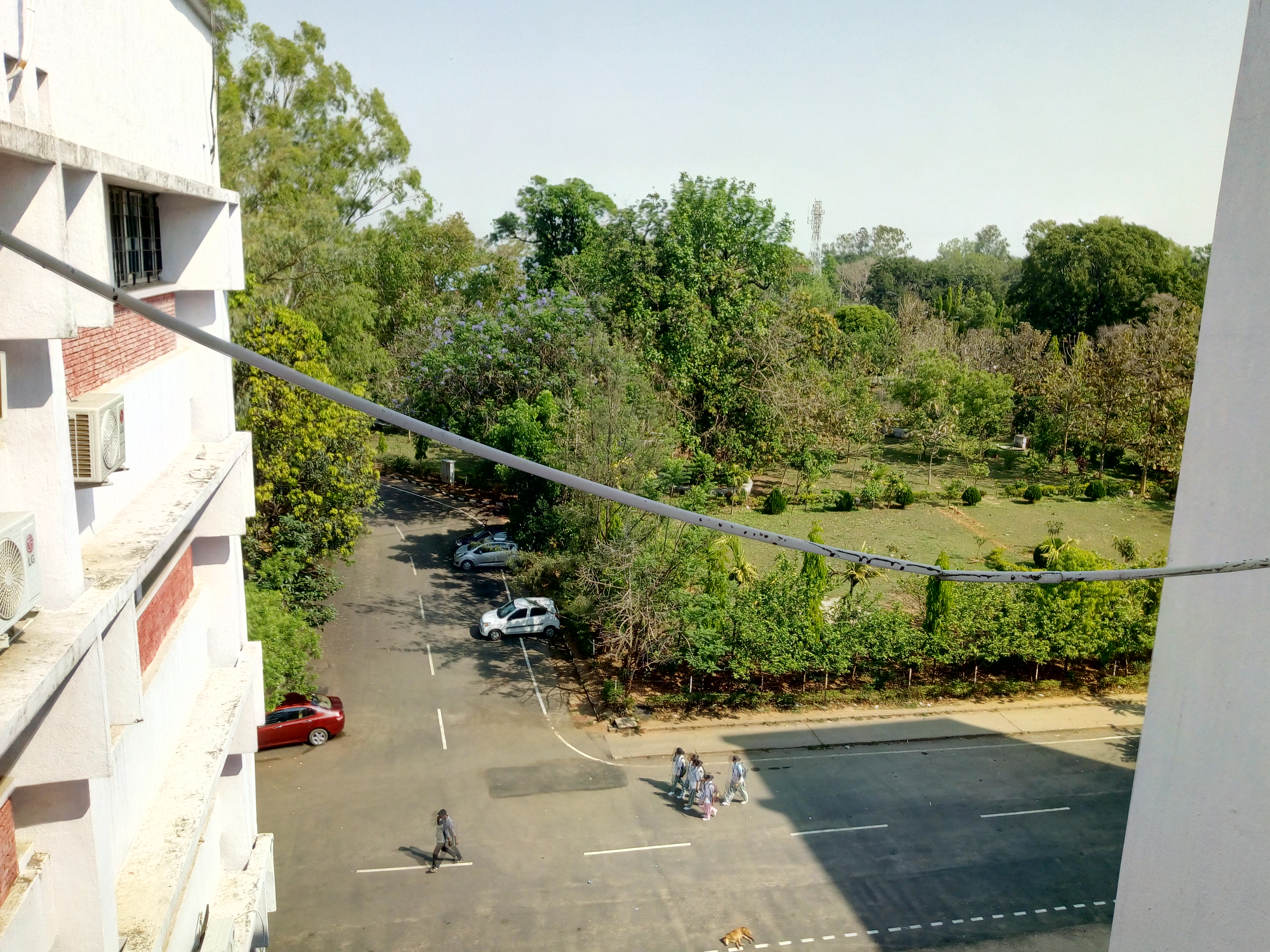
RIMS administrative wing parking and Vivekanand park as seen from academic complex

The RIMS has blocks in a multi-storied building with several medical departments. RIMS has about 33 departments which include emergency, Blood bank, Pathology, Forensic Medicine, Orthopedic, Neurosurgery, OBST & Gynae, ENT, Eye, Anesthesiology, Biochemistry, Microbiology, Pharmacology, Skin STD & Leprosy, PMR, Urology, Cardiology, Rradiology and others. RIMS has facilities like CT scan, emergency pathology for 24 hrs, AIDS Clinic, X-Ray, USG, TeleMedicine Department and a Deep X-Ray unit. Dental institute began functioning in 2017 with an annual intake of 50 students.

RIMS has its own blood bank, School of Nursing, dental college and College of Nursing. At RIMS medical courses include MBBS, BDS, postgraduate – MD, MS, DM, MCh and Diploma, Nursing courses include BSc.Nursing and Diploma in General Nursing and Midwifery (GNM). It also offers radiology and pathological investigation facilities.

A Regional Institute of ophthalmology Block is coming up.

The decision to upgrade the institute to university for conducting MBBS exams was taken in 2016.

== Buildings ==
RIMS Ranchi has a very large and spacious campus. There is an OPD complex with entrances through central emergency and a separate entrance for OPD. Main hospital building it a 5 storied building which houses all specialty departments and Neurosurgery department. The building has large corridors connecting different wards and OTs.

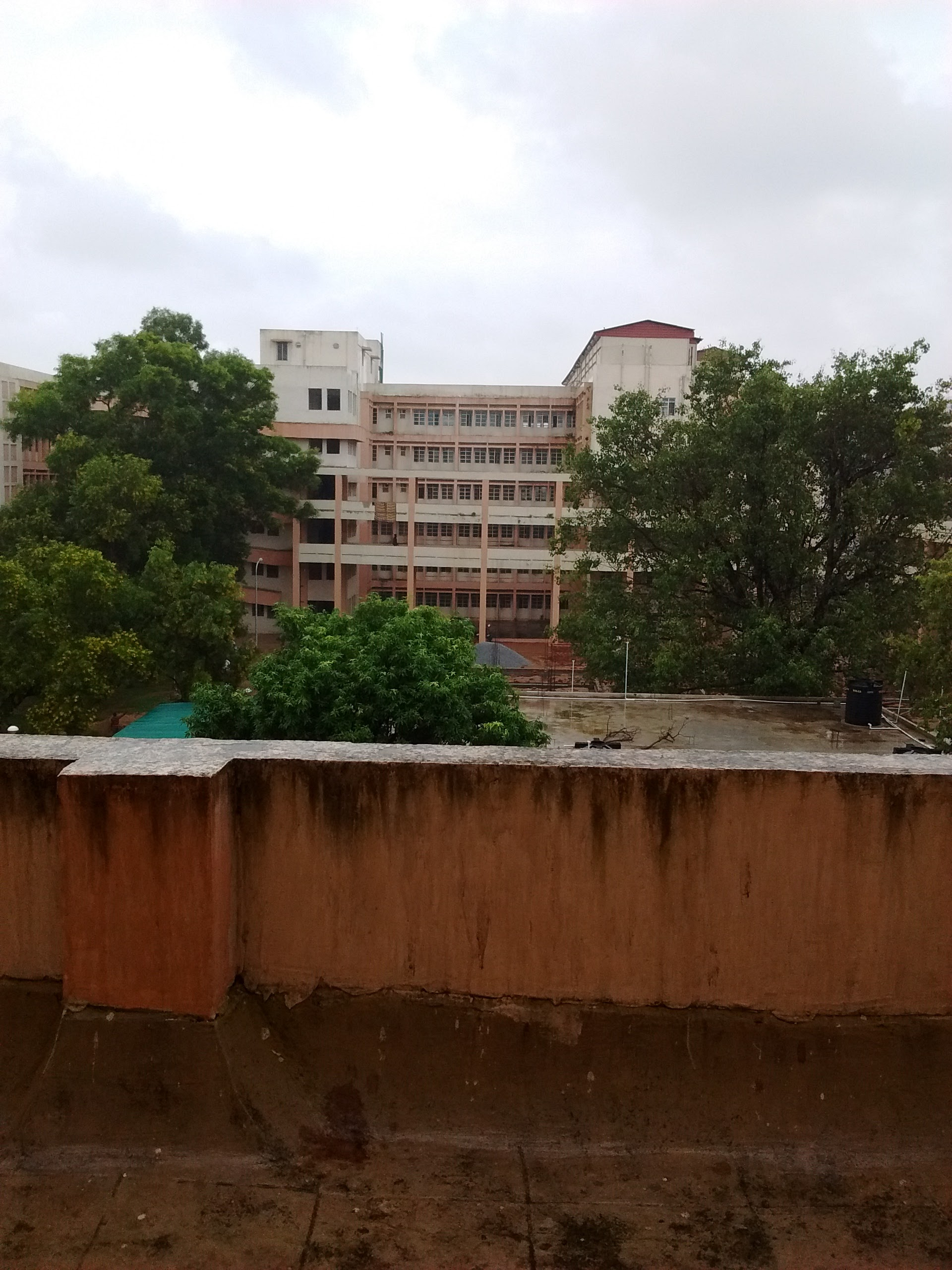
Rims Ranchi, Super Speciality Block

Super specialty building houses department of cardiology, cardio OPD, department of urology, department of pediatric surgery and has space for other departments developing in future. Oncology block it has onco OPD, ward, OTs and central library on the top 2 floors.

Several small buildings like CSSD, mechanised laundry, Blood bank, kitchen and morgue, etc. are situated within the campus. Administrative block houses offices of many officials. Academic complex houses all the lecture theatres, practical halls and director's office. Department of anatomy and FMT have separate buildings. Anatomy lecture theatre is situated next to the academic complex. RIMS Auditorium is situated near gate no 1. It is very large and can easily accommodate 500 people. Rims stadium in the campus hosts all the sports events and concerts during fests. A yoga centre and gym is coming up in the stadium building. Nursing school has 2 separate buildings. New trauma centre and emergency block, paying ward and new administrative building inaugurated in 2019. A SBI is situated inside the campus for convenience of Doctors, medical students and staff.

== Academics ==
The intake every year used to be 90 students for the undergraduate course. As per the new regulations of the National Medical Commission (NMC) it has increased its seats to fill 150 (+30 for EWS) undergraduate students. The authorities are trying to upgrade it to 250 seats.

The Institute provides postgraduate education in almost every department. The neurosurgery department offers a M.Ch. (Master chirurgiae or Master of Surgery) degree. All seats are filled through NEET, a part of it through the national level merit and rest through the state level merit.

=== Courses offered ===
- MBBS
- BDS
- M.D
- M.S
- Postgraduate diploma courses
- DM cardiology
- Mch Neurosurgery (6yrs)
- B.Sc nursing
- M.Sc nursing {Since, 2015}
- Paramedical
- Physiotherapy

The exams are conducted by Ranchi University (a non medical University). Undergraduates complete their internship before 31 March.

== Facility ==
The college has a 1500-bed multispecialty hospital. There are centres like the oncology centre, a 50-seat dental institute, a cardio-thoracic surgery centre and a nephro-urology centre. The environment around the hospital is soothing and patients are treated using unconventional techniques. Newly constructed 100 bedded paying wards provide facilities like private hospitals at an affordable price. The college has a 20-bed trauma centre, the first of its kind in eastern India.

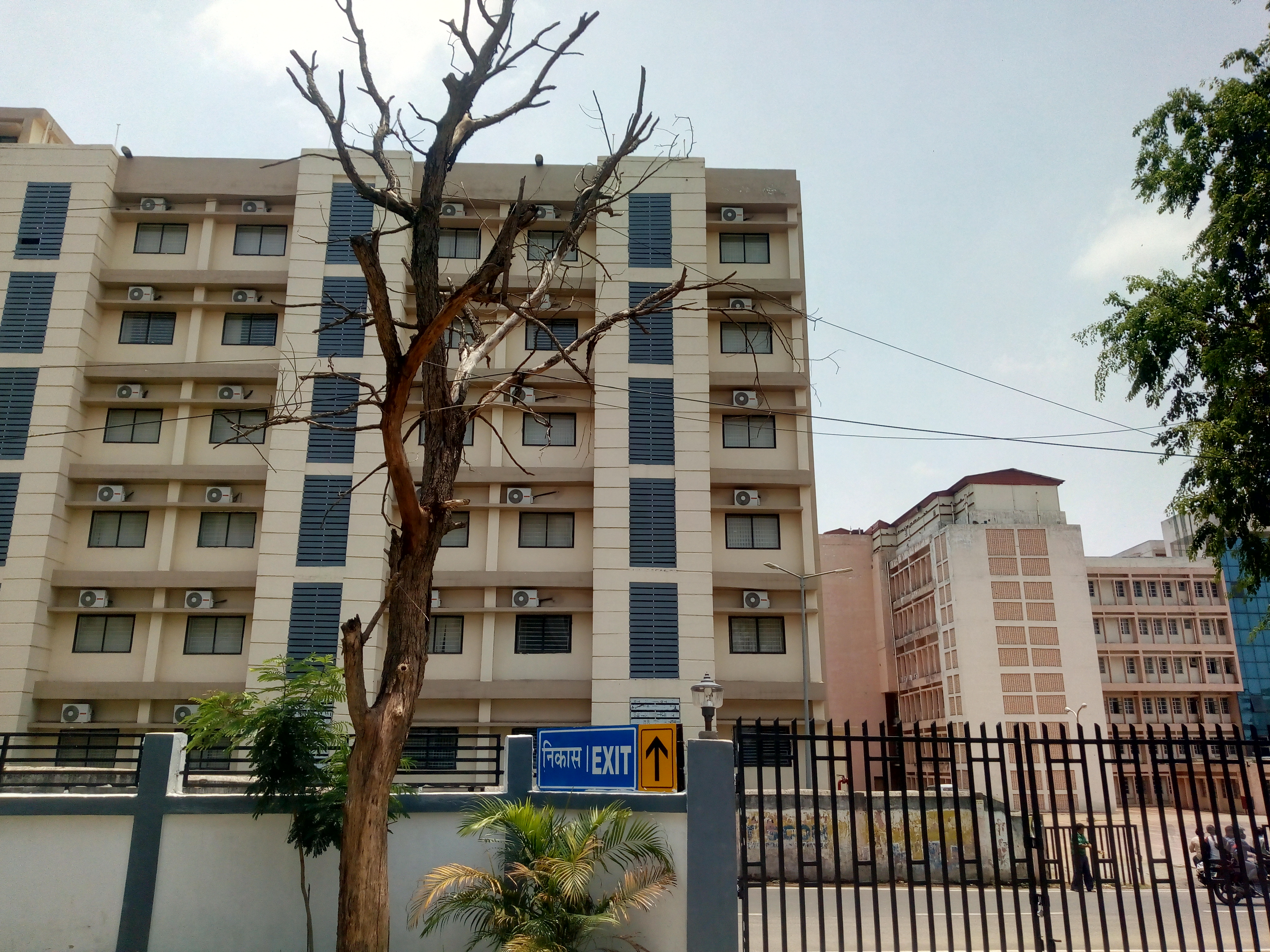
Paying wards, a part of Super Speciality block can also be seen

== Student life and extracurricular activities ==
The college used to organize an intra-college fest every year named "SYNERGY" that was discontinued in 2015. The annual college magazine, Spriha was published till the year 2014. The campus has an indoor badminton hall. Every hostel is provided with carrom and table-tennis room. A multipurpose hall is available. The maiden edition of intra-college cultural fest "Palash" and sports fest "Palaestra" was organised in the month of November 2017 and December 2019 respectively.Various societies like cultural society, movie society, literary society, quiz society and prayas are functional. Students seeking admissions into RIMS are required to submit an affidavit issued by the Court and validated by them and their parents to curb the menace of ragging.

== Campus life ==
There are seven boys hostel and many girls hostels. Boys are given single seater rooms while girls have to adjust. A new 500 roomed girls hostel is coming up. New hostel number 8 is also coming up for boys. The campus has football stadium which is used for a variety of sports. The stadium will also have a gym and yoga centre. An indoor stadium is present. Basketball court and tennis court were present in the campus but now new academic block is constructed in their place. Boys hostels have table tennis room. There is no canteen currently available.

=== In the news ===
In April 2025, the then Director was removed from service due to for bad governance and negligent work.

In July 2024, a student of the ladies hostel was questioned by the CBI in connection with a question paper leak.

== See also ==
- RIMS-2, Ranchi
- Department of Health, Medical Education and Family Welfare, Jharkhand
