= Mohammadpur Deomal Gram Panchayat =

Gram Panchayat Uttar Pradesh

- मोहम्मदपुर देवमल ग्राम पंचायत
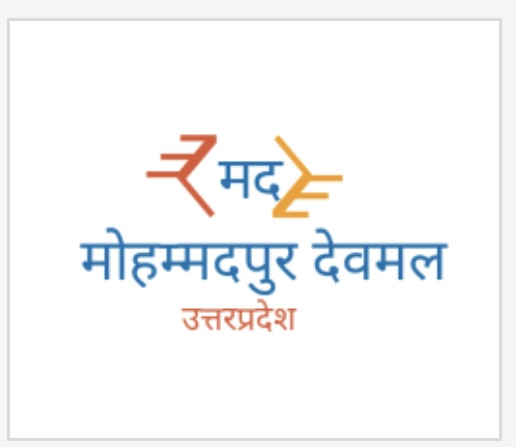
- Emblem of Mohammadpur DeomalGram Panchayat
- Abbreviation: MGP
- Nickname: Deomal Gram Panchayat
- Formation: 1979, (44 years ago)
- Type: Government Office
- Legal status: Active
- Headquarters: Mohammadpur Deomal
- Members: SP: 8 seats BJP: 6 seats (2020)
- Official language: Hindi language, English
- Pradhan: Banwari
- Deputy Pradhan: Rashid
- Affiliations: Panchayati raj
- Website: bijnor.nic.in

The Gram Panchayat of Mohammadpur Deomal or Mohammadpur Deomal Panchayat is a government office and local self-government body that governs the village of Mohammadpur Deomal and five nearby villages with 15 G.P constituencies or three Panchayat Samity constituencies in Mohammadpur deomal Block of District Bijnor in the state of Uttar Pradesh, India. It has control of The Bijnor district police station serves this panchayat, with its headquarters at Mohammadpur Deomal village.

== Gram Panchayat Village list ==
Gram Panchayat List of Mohammedpur Deomal
| S.N | Village Panchayat Name | LGD Code |
|---|---|---|
| 1 | Akbarpurdevidaswala | 55311 |
| 2 | Akberpurangakhrhi | 55312 |
| 3 | Alauddinpur | 55313 |
| 4 | Amipurnarayanpur | 55314 |
| 5 | Amipursudha | 55315 |
| 6 | Auranagabadshakoorpur | 55316 |
| 7 | Aurangpurtara | 55317 |
| 8 | Baadshahpur | 55318 |
| 9 | Badkala | 267177 |
| 10 | Bagar Nangla | 267241 |
| 11 | Bahadarpurjatt | 55319 |
| 12 | Bahruka | 55321 |
| 13 | Bakharpurghari | 55320 |
| 14 | Barkatpur | 270033 |
| 15 | Barooki | 55323 |
| 16 | Bhagain | 55322 |
| 17 | Bhojpurbhopatpur | 55324 |
| 18 | Burhanuddinpur | 267182 |
| 19 | Chandpur Noabad | 55327 |
| 20 | Chandpurpheru | 55326 |
| 21 | Chhakara | 55328 |
| 22 | Dayalwala | 55330 |
| 23 | Dhanora | 55331 |
| 24 | Dharamnagri | 55329 |
| 25 | Doulatpur | 55332 |
| 26 | Fareedpurbhogi | 55333 |
| 27 | Fareedpurdarga | 55334 |
| 28 | Fareedpurmaan | 55335 |
| 29 | Fareedpurnizam | 55336 |
| 30 | Fareedpurqazi | 55337 |
| 31 | Fareedpursansaru | 55338 |
| 32 | Fazalpur | 55339 |
| 33 | Firozpurmubarak | 55340 |
| 34 | Gablipur | 267196 |
| 35 | Gajraulashiv | 55341 |
| 36 | Gajraullaachpal | 55342 |
| 37 | Gokalpurqasam | 55343 |
| 38 | Gopalpur | 55344 |
| 39 | Ibraheempurkhandsal | 55345 |
| 40 | Ichchhawala | 55346 |
| 41 | Ilaychipurkharhghu | 55347 |
| 42 | Islampurdas | 55348 |
| 43 | Islampurlalu | 55349 |
| 44 | Itawa | 55350 |
| 45 | Jahanabad | 55351 |
| 46 | Jamalpurpathani | 55352 |
| 47 | Jhalri | 55353 |
| 48 | Kareempurbamnolli | 55354 |
| 49 | Khaliullahpur | 55355 |
| 50 | Khanpurmadho | 55356 |
| 51 | Kherhkihemraj | 55357 |
| 52 | Khurhaheri | 55358 |
| 53 | Kishanpur | 55359 |
| 54 | Kishanwas | 267230 |
| 55 | Kundanpur | 55360 |
| 56 | Kuwar Chatarbhoj | 267212 |
| 57 | Machki | 55361 |
| 58 | Madhusudanpur Nand Urf Jhalra | 55362 |
| 59 | Maheshwari | 55363 |
| 60 | Mandawalisaidu | 55364 |
| 61 | Mangolpura | 55365 |
| 62 | Maqsoodanpurhafeez | 55366 |
| 63 | Mirzapur Bangar | 55325 |
| 64 | Mirzapurmahesh | 55367 |
| 65 | Moazzampursujan | 55368 |
| 66 | Mohandiyadhansi | 55369 |
| 67 | Mohd.purmandawali | 55370 |
| 68 | Mohdpurdevmal | 55371 |
| 69 | Mohdpurlakhkhu | 55372 |
| 70 | Mohiuddinpur | 55373 |
| 71 | Mukimpur Jamal | 55378 |
| 72 | Mundhala | 55374 |
| 73 | Muqeempurdharamsi | 55375 |
| 74 | Muqeempurdharu | 55376 |
| 75 | Murtazapurbulaki | 55377 |
| 76 | Muzzaffarpurkesho | 55379 |
| 77 | Naseeri | 55380 |
| 78 | Padampur | 267213 |
| 79 | Papavar Khurd | 267186 |
| 80 | Qasampurkirparam | 55381 |
| 81 | Qaziwala | 55382 |
| 82 | Rafiulnagarurfrawli | 55383 |
| 83 | Raipurberisal | 55384 |
| 84 | Ramjiwala | 55385 |
| 85 | Rasheedpurgarhi | 55386 |
| 86 | Rasoolpurpirthi | 55387 |
| 87 | Ratanpurriyaya | 55388 |
| 88 | Sadakpur | 55389 |
| 89 | Saifpur Bangar | 267193 |
| 90 | Saifpurkhadar | 55390 |
| 91 | Shadipur | 55391 |
| 92 | Shahzadpur | 55392 |
| 93 | Shehbazpur | 55393 |
| 94 | Shekhupura | 55394 |
| 95 | Suaherhibuzurg | 55395 |
| 96 | Suaherhikhurd | 55396 |
| 97 | Taimoorpurdeepa | 55397 |
| 98 | Tarikampurroopchand | 55398 |
| 99 | Tayyabpurquazi | 55399 |
| 100 | Teep | 55400 |
| 101 | Teetarwala | 55401 |
| 102 | Ulakpur | 55402 |
| 103 | Umarpurmeera | 241779 |
| 104 | Yousufpurhameed | 241780 |
