= Harewali =

Village in Uttar Pradesh, India

Harewali is a village located at Bijnor district of Uttar Pradesh.

== Geographical location ==
Harewali is located at 29.40190°N 78.59400°E. It is 5.9 km N of Sherkot, 8.6 km W of Afzalgarh, 12.1 km NE of Dhampur, 15.0 km ESE of Nagina. It is located near the Uttar Pradesh-Uttarakhand border. The village is close to a number of naturally beautiful places such as a forest, rivers and hills. Harewali has 1st Barrage (Chhota Bandh) of Ramganga Pariyojna approved at Kalagarh which has 25 gates for Ramganga River and 5 gates for KHO river passed through Sherkot.
