= Alampur =

Alampur may refer to the following :

== Places in India ==
- Alampur, Agra, a village in Agra district, Uttar Pradesh
- Alampur, Bijnor, a village in Bijnor district, Uttar Pradesh
- Alampur, Jalandhar, village in the Indian Punjab
- Alampur, Madhya Pradesh, town in Madhya Pradesh
- Alampur, Jogulamba Gadwal district, village in Telangana
  - Alampur Museum, a museum located in Alampur, Mahbubnagar
  - Alampur Navabrahma Temples, located in Alampur, Mahbubnagar
- Alampur (SC) (Assembly constituency), a constituency of Telangana Legislative Assembly
- Alampur Kot, village in Ramnagar Mandal of Bareilly district in Uttar Pradesh, India
- Alampur, Gujarat, a town in Western India

== Other ==
- Alampur Baneshan (mango), a mango variety
- Dr. Alampur Saibaba Goud, an Indian ophthalmologist, founder-chairman of the Devnar Foundation for the Blind

== See also ==
- Dera Alampur Gondlan, a village in Tehsil Kharian, in the Gujrat District of Punjab, Pakistan
