= Heerapur Gokal =

Heerapur Gokal Garhwawala
- Village
- Location in Uttar Pradesh, India Heerapur Gokal (India)
- Coordinates: 29.4°N 78.68°E
- Country: India
- State: Uttar Pradesh
- District: Bijnor District
- Elevation: 212 m (696 ft)

Population
  - Total: 3,063

Languages
  - Official: Hindi
- Time zone: UTC+5:30 (IST)

Heerapur Gokal is a panchayat near Afzalgarh block in Dhampur tehsil Bijnor District in the Indian state of Uttar Pradesh. It is located at the border with the state of Uttarakhand.

== Geography ==
Heerapur Gokal is located at 29°24′N 78°41′E, or 29.4°N 78.68°E.[1] It has an average elevation of 212 metres (695 feet). The nearby cities are Kalagarh, Sherkot, Dhampur, Jaspur and Kashipur.

== History ==
The village was founded in the mid-19th century, by a man named Heera Singh Saini, who came from the Himalaya side with many cows. These cows were short in height. The same type of cow is still available in this village raised by Saini families. After the name of Heera Sigh Saini and their cow, this village became Heerapur Gokal (meaning village of Heera having cow family). It is located in the Afzalgarh Development Block, Dhampur tehsil.

== Demographics ==
As of 2011 Indian Census, Heerapur Gokal had a total population of 3,063, of which 1,618 were males and 1,455 were females. Population within the age group of 0 to 6 years was 405.
