= Tharuka =

Village in Uttar Pradesh, India

- village
- Interactive map of Tharuka
- Country: India
- State: Uttar Pradesh
- District: Bijnor
- Block: Mohammadpur Deomal
- Established: 2007; 19 years ago
- Founder: Abdul Salam Mansoori

Government
  - Type: Gram Panchayat Pradhan
  - Body: Gram panchayat
  - Pradhan: Babbu Urf Jehngir Khan
- Elevation: 400 m (1,300 ft)

Population (2011)
  - Total: 406

Languages
  - Official: Hindi, Urdu, खड़ीबोली
- Time zone: UTC+5:30 (IST)
- Postal code: 246701
- Telephone code: 01342
- Vehicle registration: UP 20

Tharuka is a small village and panchayat, near Madhusudanpur Nand Urf Jhalra block in Bijnor district, Uttar Pradesh, India 2011 According to the 2011 census, 406 families reside in the village.
