= Tajpur =

Tajpur may refer to several places in India:

- Tajpur, Bhongir mandal, a village in Yadadri Bhuvanagiri district, Telangana
- Tajpur, Bihar, a block in Samastipur district, Bihar
- Tajpur, Dildarnagar, a village in Karanda, Uttar Pradesh
- Tajpur, Ghazipur, a village in Uttar Pradesh
- Tajpur, Kapurthala, a village in Punjab
- Tajpur, Raebareli, a village in Uttar Pradesh
- Tajpur, West Bengal, a city in Purba Medinipur, West Bengal
  - Tajpur Port, a proposed sea port in Tajpur, West Bengal

== See also ==
- Tajpuri (disambiguation)
- Tejpura (disambiguation)
- Tezpur, a city in Assam, India
- Raja Ka Tajpur, a city in Bijnor, Uttar Pradesh
- Tajpur Fatepur, a village in West Bengal, India
- Tajpur Manjha, a village in Uttar Pradesh, India
- Tajpur Kurrah, a village in Uttar Pradesh, India
