= Alampur Noabad =

- village
- Interactive map of Alampur Noabad
- Coordinates: 29°26′19″N 78°11′52″E
- Country: India
- State: Uttar Pradesh
- District: Bijnor
- Block: Mohammadpur Deomal
- Established: 2006; 20 years ago
- Founder: Abdul Salam Mansoori

Government
  - Type: Gram Panchayat Pradhan
  - Body: Gram panchayat
  - Pradhan: Babbu Urf Jehngir Khan
- Elevation: 300 m (980 ft)

Population (2011)
  - Total: 102

Languages
  - Official: Hindi, Urdu, खड़ीबोली
- Time zone: UTC+5:30 (IST)
- Postal code: 246701
- Telephone code: 01342
- Vehicle registration: UP 20

Alampur Noabad is a small village and near by panchayat Madhusudanpur Nand Urf Jhalra block Mohammadpur Deomal in Bijnor district in the Indian state of Uttar Pradesh.
