= Madhusudanpur Jagan =

Village block in India

- village
- Country: India
- State: Uttar Pradesh
- District: Bijnor
- Established: 2000; 26 years ago

Government
  - Type: Gram Panchayat Pradhan
  - Body: Gram panchayat
  - Pradhan: Gulsher

Area
  - Total: 98 ha (240 acres)

Languages
  - Officials: Hindi, Urdu
- Time zone: UTC+5:30 (IST)
- Postal code: 246764
- Vehicle registration: UP 20

Madhusudanpur Jagan is a village block Mohammadpur Deomal in Bijnor district in Tttarpradesh, India near by NH 34 and Bijnor Public School.
