= Chelapur =

Coordinates: 29°05′N 78°29′E

- village
- Location in Uttar Pradesh, India Chelapur (India)
- Country: India
- State: Uttar Pradesh
- District: Bijnor

Government
  - Body: Gram panchayat

Population
  - Total: 644

Languages
  - Official: Hindi
- Time zone: UTC+5:30 (IST)
- PIN: 246727
- Telephone code: 01345

Chelapur is a village and gram panchayat in Chandpur tehsil, Bijnor District, in the Indian state of Uttar Pradesh.

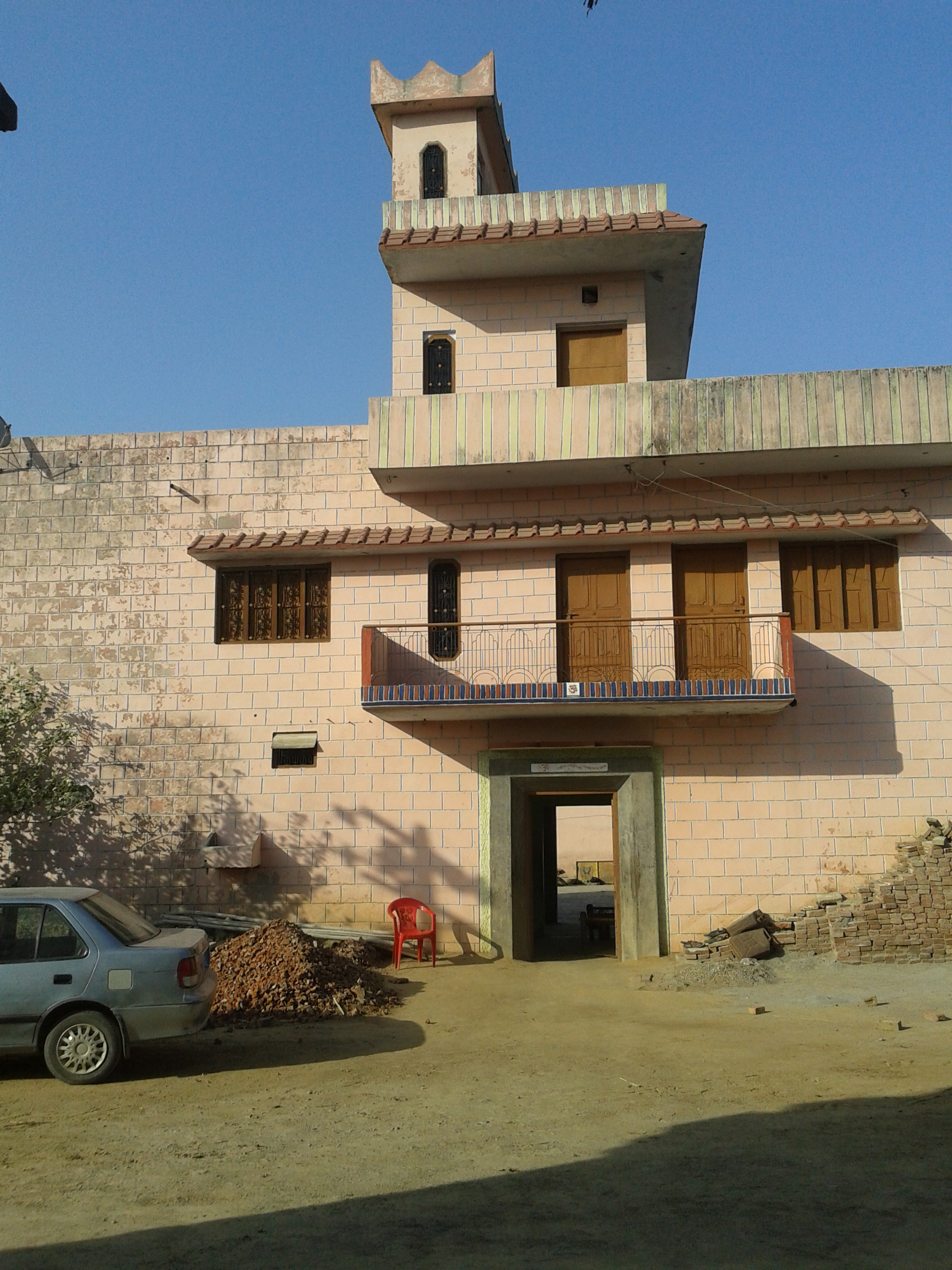
A building in Chelapur.

== Demographics ==
As of census 2001, Chelapur had a population of 644. Males are 354, and females are 290. The location code or village code of Chelapur village is 114473. There are about 121 houses in Chelapur village.

== Location ==
It is situated on the Noorpur-Moradabad road, 25 km (16 mi) from its sub-district headquarters at Chandpur and 49 km (30 mi) from the district headquarters at Bijnor.

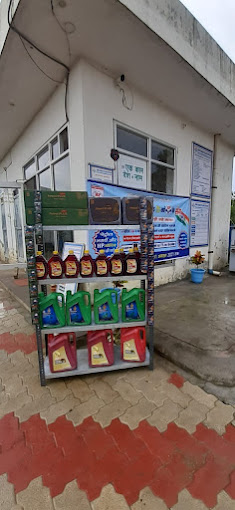
A filling station at Chelpaur

The post office serving the village lies in the nearby village of Nangli Pathwari and the designated police station is in Noorpur, the nearest town, which is around 11 km (6.8 mi) distant.

== Education ==
Chelapur village has higher literacy rate compared to Uttar Pradesh. In 2011, literacy rate of Chelapur village was 71.58% compared to 67.68% of Uttar Pradesh. In Chelapur male literacy stands at 81.76% while female literacy rate was 60.00%.

There is only one primary school in the village, therefore the parents send their children to nearby towns and cities like Noorpur, Dhampur.

== Culture ==
There is an old holy Peepal tree in the village commonly known as 'Dada Devta'. Nearby this holy tree a Shiv Temple is also present.

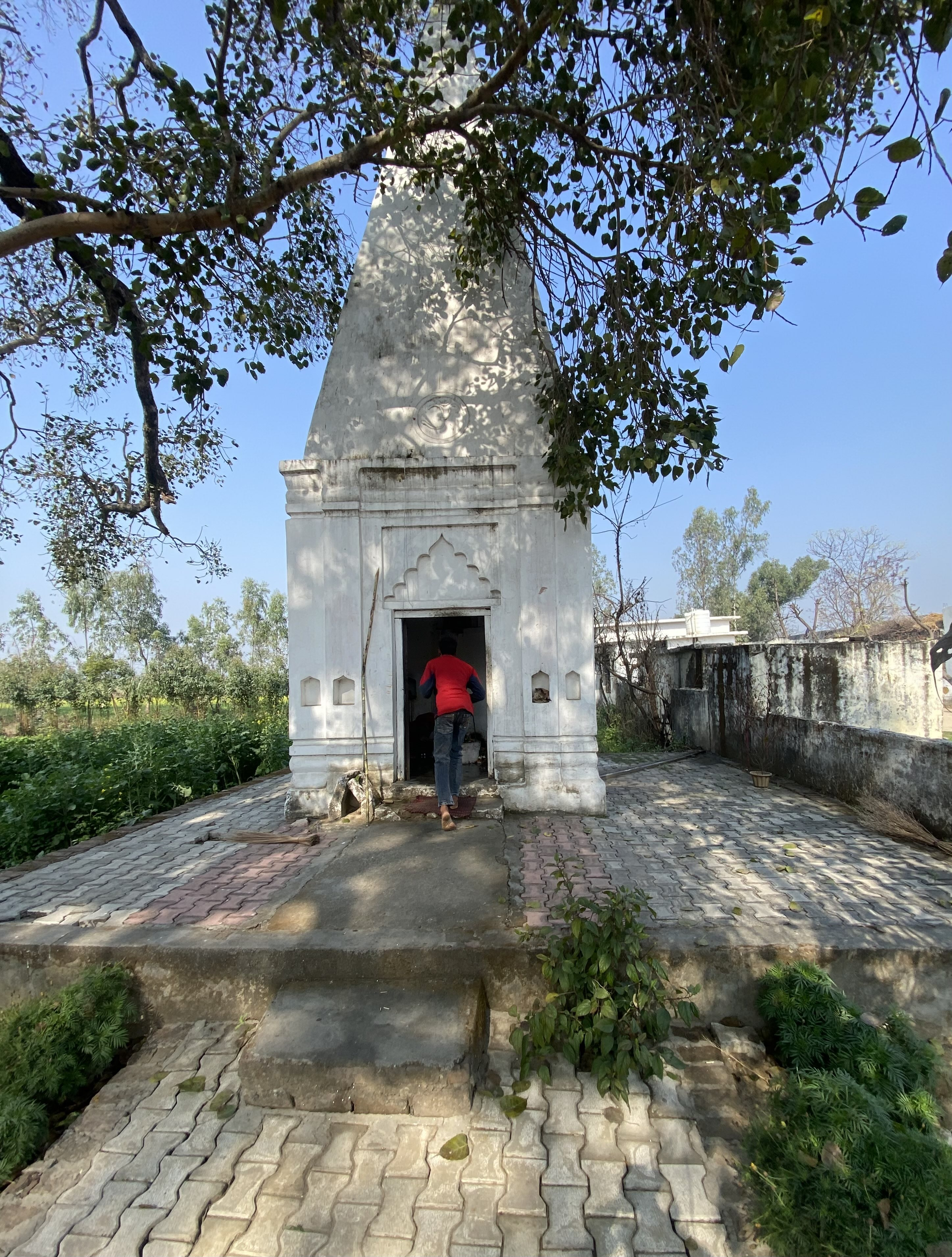
Shiv Temple Chelapur

. The people of village are aware of importance of education and send their children to nearby schools in town.

Some of the villages near Chelapur are Gohawar, Askaripur, Abdullapur Dahana, Doondhli, Saidpur Mafi, Nangla and others.

== Political and social environment ==
The village forms a part of the Noorpur Vidhan Sabha constituency.

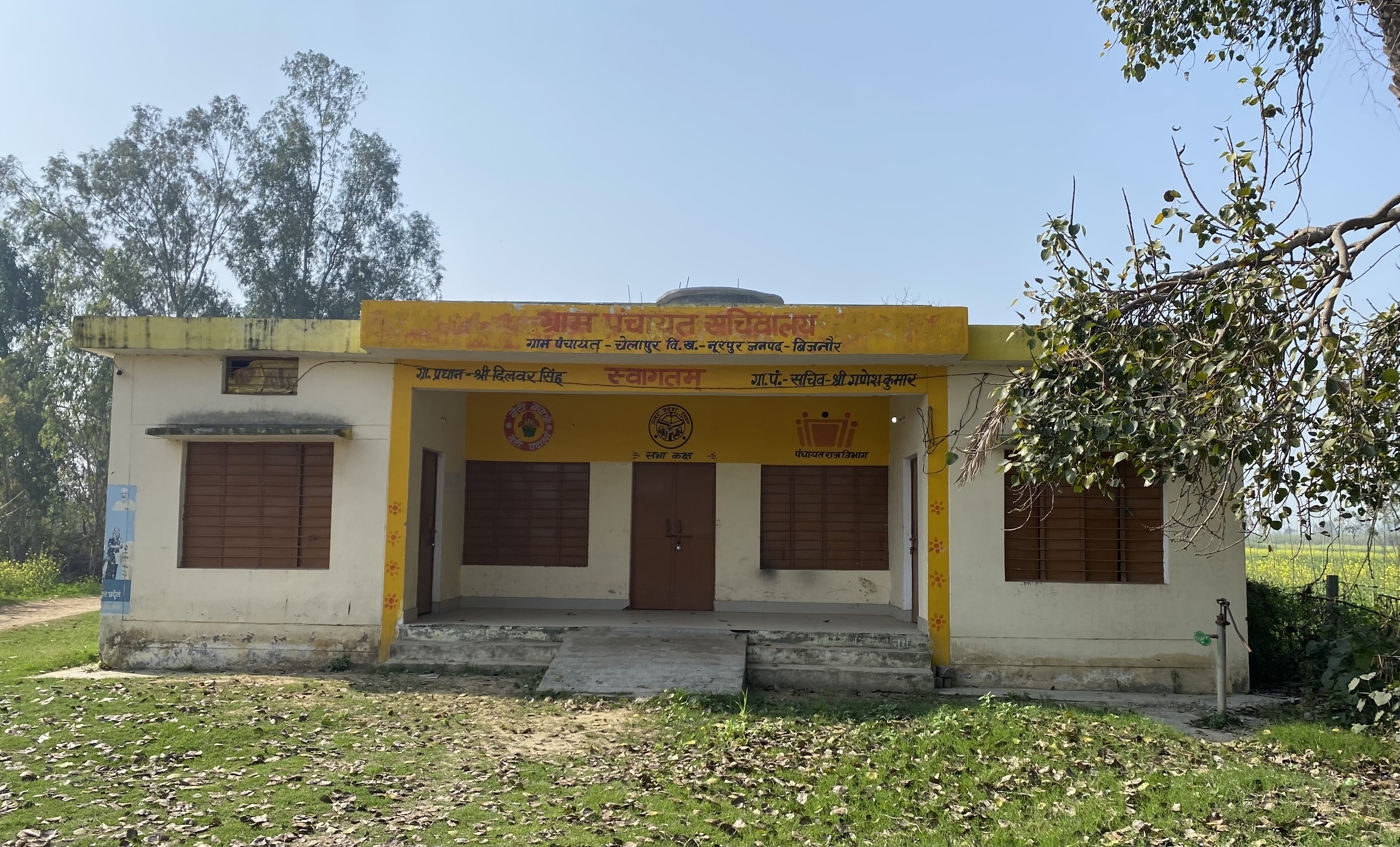
Gram Panchayat Sachivalya Chelapur
