= Alampur, Bijnor =

- Interactive map of Alampur, Bijnor
- Coordinates: 29°28′51″N 78°18′0″E
- Country: India
- State: Uttar Pradesh
- District: Bijnor

Alampur is a small village in Najibabad Tehsil in Bijnor District of Uttar Pradesh State, India. It comes under Kalanpur Buzurg Urf Bahupura Panchayath. It belongs to Moradabad Division. It is located 7 km towards Kiratpur railway station and 19 km from the District headquarters, Bijnor.

The nearby villages are Bahupura, Umari, Sisona and Fazalpur.
