= Jaleel Ahmad =

Indian Muslim scholar and politician (1941–1996)

Member of the Legislative Assembly, Uttar Pradesh

Mufti

Member of the Uttar Pradesh Legislative Assembly for Afzalgarh
- In office 1977–1980
- Preceded by: Kranti Kumar
- Succeeded by: Thamman Singh
- Majority: Janata party

Personal details
- Born: Jaleel Ahmad; 1941 Nagina, Bijnor district, United Provinces, British India
- Died: 30 November 1996 (aged 54–55) Nagina, Bijnor District, Uttar Pradesh, India
- Resting place: Pahari Darwaza Cemetery, Nagina
- Party: Janata Party, Bahujan Samaj Party, Indian National Congress
- Parent: Qari Ahmad Hasan (father)
- Education: Darul Uloom Deoband
- Occupation: Islamic scholar, politician
- Known for: Religious services, politics, educational activities

Jaleel Ahmad (1941 – 30 November 1996) was an Indian Islamic scholar, educator, and politician from Nagina, Bijnor district. He played a key role in establishing religious institutions and promoting education within his community.

== Early life and education ==
Jaleel Ahmad was born in 1941 in Nagina, Bijnor district. He received his early education from his father, Qari Ahmad Hasan. After completing his secondary studies, he joined Darul Uloom Deoband, where he specialized in Islamic jurisprudence and earned his degree of completion. His profound understanding of jurisprudence and exceptional memorization skills symbolized his scholarly excellence.

== Career ==
Ahmad established Jamia Arabia Rashidiya, Phulwaad, a prominent Islamic seminary, which flourished under his supervision, offering advanced education up to Daura-e-Hadith (the final year of the Dars-e-Nizami curriculum). He also managed Madrasa Tajweed-ul-Quran, which was initially established to provide Quranic education to visually impaired students. It now also accommodates non-visually impaired students.

He served as a member of the Jamiat Ulama-e-Hind, the city Qazi of Nagina, and the custodian of the Eidgah (prayer ground). Additionally, he worked as the General Secretary of his district's Jamiat for one term. He worked to expand religious education and contributed to the welfare of the Muslim community.

=== Political career ===
Ahmad actively participated in politics. In 1977, he was elected as a Member of the Legislative Assembly (MLA) from the Afzalgarh constituency on a Janata Party ticket, securing 118,885 votes. During his tenure, he promoted various developmental projects in his constituency.

Later, he became the district president of the Bahujan Samaj Party (BSP) and played a significant role in strengthening the party in Bijnor district. According to the Election Commission of India's 1990 report, he contested the 1989 parliamentary elections from the Amroha constituency on a BSP ticket and secured 86,630 votes, but did not win. It is documented that due to differences with Mayawati, he left the BSP and joined the Indian National Congress (INC) through N. D. Tiwari.

=== Positions ===
Ahmad was associated with several social and educational institutions. He served as a member of the Waqf Board, the Municipal Committee, and the District Jail Committee, working for prisoners' welfare and addressing their concerns during jail visits.

== Death ==
Ahmad died on 30 November 1996, at the age of 55 and was buried the next day in the premises of Jamia Rashidiya. His funeral was attended by a large number of people. After his death, his son, Khaleeq Ahmad, took over the leadership of Jamia Rashidia and continued to advance the institution.

== See also ==
- List of Deobandis
