= Ratangarh, Bijnor =

Ratangarh Aazamgarh
- Village
- Location in Uttar Pradesh, India
- Coordinates: 29.103°N 78.363°E
- Country: India
- State: Uttar Pradesh
- District: Bijnor
- Founder: Rao Zokha Singh Tyagi

Languages
  - Official: Hindi
- Time zone: UTC+5:30 (IST)
- PIN: 246734
- Telephone code: 01345
- Vehicle registration: up-20-....
- Nearest city: Moradabad
- Lok Sabha constituency: bijnor
- Vidhan Sabha constituency: chandpur

Ratangarh is a village in the northwestern Rohilkhand region of Uttar Pradesh state of India. It is located in the administrative district of Bijnor.

== Historical background ==
Ratangarh was founded in the early nineteenth century by Rao Zokha Singh Tyagi. He was a former commander (or Rao) of the northern branch of the Maratha Confederate Army, whose control ranged to the Tarai baselands of the Himalayas. After the Maratha decline that followed the Battle of Delhi, he became a mercenary-adventurer. For a period, he served as the commanding general (Sipehsalar) of the principality of Sardhana near Meerut. He then moved on to found his own principality (or riyasat) with Ratangarh at its center. Ratangarh (literal meaning: Jewel Fort) was established near the site of an older defunct settlement called Azamgarh (literal meaning: Supreme Fort). Since the last days of the Mughal Empire, government revenue documents have interchangeably referred to the village as Ratangarh, Azamgarh-urf-Ratangarh (literally: Azamgarh-alias-Ratangarh), or Ratangarh-urf-Azamgarh.

Along with the rest of Rohilkhand, Ratangarh was affected by the general rebellion against the British in 1857. Economic depression followed for a period. However, it was one of the first settlements in India to be electrified, in the mid-1920s, and this brought about a revival. A school was established in the 1930s. A largely feudal agrarian system (Zamindari) held sway until the 1940s, after which a combination of legislature-driven land reform (such as the Uttar Pradesh Zamindari Abolition Act, 1950, and the Uttar Pradesh Imposition of Ceiling on Land Holdings Act, 1960) and the Bhoodan movement brought about land redistribution, similar to other areas of Rohilkhand. At the independence and partition of India in 1947, the region as a whole witnessed an influx of Punjabis and Sikhs from the areas that now make up Pakistan, though Ratangarh itself was relatively unaffected by this demographic change.

In a notable event, on 6 April 1885, a meteorite was sighted over Ratangarh and fell close to the nearby settlement of Chandpur.

The Shiv Bhavan Haveli in Ratangarh, built by Shiv Dayal Singh and Shiv Nath Singh, two grandsons of Rao Zokha Singh

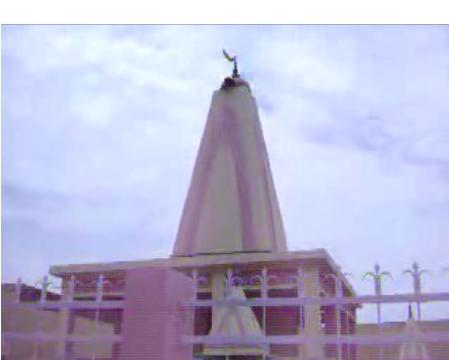
The cement-renovated village temple, originally built by Zokha Singh

Haveli built by Shiv Dayal Singh (grandson of Rao Zokha Singh)

== Demography and culture ==
The village reflects the broader cultural background of the region of Rohilkhand, flavored by its proximity to the hill state of Uttarakhand. The language is the Western Hindi/Urdu dialect of Khari Boli, and is extensively Persianized in its vocabulary. The population is largely Hindu with a significant Muslim (both Shia and Sunni) minority. Local castes in this region of Rohilkhand include Tyagi, Ahirs/Yadavs, Jat, Rajput, Rohilla Pashtun (after whom the region is named), and Dalit.

As in Uttarakhand and Nepal, the most important festival is Dashehra, commemorating the victory of Lord Ram over Ravan. A traditional folk-play (Ramlila), that dramatizes the Ramayan, is enacted over several consecutive nights, culminating on Dashehra. Though the play has Hindu religious significance, both the Hindu and Muslim communities participate in the festivities. Other important festivals include Holi, Eid-ul-Fitr, Eid-ul-Azha, Moharram and Diwali.

== Ecology ==
For the first century after its foundation, the environs of the village were heavily forested and contiguous with the Tarai forests that hemmed the Himalayan foothills. Wildlife (chital deer, monkey, hare, porcupine, wolf and leopard) was widespread. Pressures stemming from the rapid population increase in the twentieth century resulted in mass deforestation. These species are now confined to the nearby Jim Corbett National Park, with only monkeys and peacocks remaining in numbers in the village area. Snakes and hares continue to be common in the farm fields.

== Geography and climate ==
Ratangarh is located at latitude 29°6'10"N and longitude 78°21'50"E, along the highway that connects Fina (often anglicized as "Pheona") with Noorpur. The main village has a triangular shape, with the highway, a string of ponds and a rural road as the three edges. The village is at an approximate altitude of 750 feet, and the terrain is largely flat.

The temperature ranges from a daytime maximum of about 42 °C (108 °F) at the height of summer to a nighttime minimum of about 0 °C (32 °F) during the coldest period of winter. There are five seasons: hot and dry summer, monsoonal rains, mild autumn, moderate winter and mild spring. Midwinter frost is common, and often damaging to crops and fruit. As with many areas of northwestern India, northern Pakistan and western Nepal, the region is part of the non-monsoonal Western Disturbance rain system that provides winter rains necessary for the wheat crop. While it gets relatively hot in the summer, the 1886 edition of the Imperial Gazetteer of India compared the district's climate favorably to that of both the Tarai and areas further south: "Its proximity to the Himalayas renders the climate of Bijnor cool and pleasant, while the abundance of drainage channels prevents the District from being as unhealthy as other tracts near the foot of the mountains."

== Economy ==
The economy is primarily based on agriculture (grains and fruit). Staples (mainly wheat, with some jau or barley and bajra or pearl millet) are produced. There are also many sugarcane fields, and fruit orchards (mango, mulberry, pomegranate, jamun or rose apple and shareefa or sugar apple). Limited quantities of anjeer or fig and ber or Indian jujube are also produced. In non-agricultural activity, there are some retail outlets, doctors, flour mills and teachers. Land reform and urban-bound migration and divestment by the former zamindars has resulted in some economic equalization, with a more evenly distributed pattern of land ownership, including by Dalits. Many youth from all segments of the population seek careers in the small towns nearby (Fina, Chandpur, Sherkot, Bijnor) or the larger towns further afield (Meerut, Hardwar, Delhi).

== Notable residents ==
- Deep Tyagi (1928–1969), assistant commissioner for the Indian Family Planning program until 1969
- Mahavir Tyagi (1899–1980), Indian independence activist and parliamentarian
- Sanjeev Tyagi, an actor famous for his role in TV Program “Crime Patrol” (1971–present). He has also acted in Bollywood movies.
