= Suawala =

- Village
- Location within Uttar Pradesh Location within India
- Coordinates: 29°17′43″N 78°40′30″E
- Country: India
- State: Uttar Pradesh
- District: Bijnor
- Tehsil: Dhampur

Population
  - Total: 5,741
- Time zone: UTC+5:30 (IST)
- PIN: 246747
- STD Code: 01343
- ISO 3166 code: IN-UP
- Website: up.gov.in

Suawala is a village of the Bijnor district, Uttar Pradesh, India. It is located at the border with the state of Uttarakhand. Pin Code is 246747. Tehsil Dhampur and Block Afzalgarh.

== Demographics ==
As of 2011 Indian Census, Suwala had a total population of 5,741, of which 3,050 were males and 2,691 were females. Population within the age group of 0 to 6 years was 752.

== Location ==
The village is located in Dhampur Tehsil of Bijnor district in Uttar Pradesh, India. It is situated 22 km away from sub-district headquarter Dhampur and 67 km away from district headquarter Bijnor. As per 2009 stats, Suawala village is also a gram panchayat.

== Climate ==
Climate data for Bijnor, Uttar Pradesh
Month	Jan	Feb	Mar	Apr	May	Jun	Jul	Aug	Sep	Oct	Nov	Dec	Year
Average high °C (°F)	20.8 (69.4)	23.7 (74.7)	29.6 (85.3)	35.9 (96.6)	39.5 (103.1)	38.7 (101.7)	34.4 (93.9)	33.4 (92.1)	33.6 (92.5)	32.6 (90.7)	27.9 (82.2)	22.5 (72.5)	31.1 (88.0)
Daily mean °C (°F)	13.7 (56.7)	16.5 (61.7)	21.9 (71.4)	28.0 (82.4)	31.9 (89.4)	32.8 (91.0)	30.2 (86.4)	29.5 (85.1)	28.8 (83.8)	25.6 (78.1)	20.0 (68.0)	15.1 (59.2)	24.5 (76.1)
Average low °C (°F)	6.7 (44.1)	9.3 (48.7)	14.2 (57.6)	20.1 (68.2)	24.4 (75.9)	26.9 (80.4)	26.1 (79.0)	25.5 (77.9)	24 (75)	18.7 (65.7)	12.2 (54.0)	7.6 (45.7)	18.0 (64.4)
Average precipitation mm (inches)	21.9 (0.86)	18.6 (0.73)	14.0 (0.55)	9.3 (0.37)	17.2 (0.68)	81.8 (3.22)	243.0 (9.57)	267.4 (10.53)	136.3 (5.37)	18.9 (0.74)	5.1 (0.20)	7.9 (0.31)	841.3 (33.12)
Average precipitation days	1.8	1.5	1.4	1.1	1.4	3.3	8.8	9.4	4.1	1.2	0.6	0.9	35.5
Source: Weatherb
