= Kiratpur =

Kiratpur may refer to:

- Kiratpur, Bijnor, city and a municipal board in the Bijnor district of Uttar Pradesh, India
  - Kiratpur Municipal Council
- Kiratpur, Mainpuri, village in the Mainpuri district of Uttar Pradesh, India
- Kiratpur Raja Ram, village in the Vaishali district of Bihar, India
- Kiratpur Sahib, town in the Rupnagar district of Punjab, India
