= Alauddinpur =

Village in Uttar Pradesh, India

- village
- Location within Uttar Pradesh Location within India
- Coordinates: 25°18′58.036″N 82°53′35.153″E
- Country: India
- State: Uttar Pradesh
- District: Bijnor
- Established: 1902; 124 years ago
- Founder: alauddin

Government
  - Type: Gram Panchayat Pradhan
  - Body: Gram panchayat
  - Pradhan: Fahmida Khan

Area
  - Total: 9,000.12 ha (22,239.8 acres)

Population (2011)
  - Total: 1,152
  - Density: 12.80/km^{2} (33.15/sq mi)

Languages
  - Officials: Hindi, Urdu
- Time zone: UTC+5:30 (IST)
- Vehicle registration: UP 20
- saaf suthra gav

Alauddinpur is an Indian village this village Bijnor district Uttar Pradesh in India pin code 246701 in panchyat block Mohammadpur Deomal The panchayat of the village has 13 wards.

== School ==
S.N	Name	Management	Category	Boys	Girls	Teachers	School Code
1	Satya Parbhat Bal Vidhyia Nikeetan Jhandapur	Private Unaided	Upper Primary With Grades 1 To 8	44	42	1	9030928202
