= Tatarpur Lallu =

Tatarpur Lallu Adarsh Nagar
- Village
- Location in Uttar Pradesh, India
- Coordinates: 29°37′36″N 78°19′11″E
- Country: India
- State: Uttar Pradesh
- District: Bijnor

Government
  - Type: Gram Panchayat
  - Body: Gram Sarkar
  - Gram Pradhan: Meenakshi Tyagi

Area
  - Total: 1 km^{2} (0.39 sq mi)

Population (2011)
  - Total: 11,000
  - Density: 11,000/km^{2} (28,000/sq mi)

Languages
  - Official: Hindi
- Time zone: UTC+5:30 (IST)
- Vehicle registration: UP
- Website: up.gov.in

Tatarpur Lallu is a village in Bijnor district in the Indian state of Uttar Pradesh.

== Demographics ==
As of 2001 India census, Tatarpur Lallu had a population of 5,967. Males constitute 54% of the population and females 46%. Adarsh Nagar has an average literacy rate of 71%, higher than the national average of 59.5%: male literacy is 77%, and female literacy is 63%. In Adarsh Nagar, 14% of the population is under 6 years of age.
