= Mandawali, Bijnor =

Village in Uttar Pradesh, India

Coordinates: 29°38′41″N 78°15′18″E

Mandawali
- village
- Interactive map of Mandawali
- Country: India
- District: Bijnor
- Established: 1890; 136 years ago
- Founder: OM Prakash Tyagi[Mukhiya Parivar]

Government
  - Type: Gram Panchayat Pradhan
  - Body: Gram panchayat

Area
  - Total: 7,000.12 ha (17,297.7 acres)

Population (2011)
  - Total: 4,845
  - Density: 69.21/km^{2} (179.3/sq mi)
- Demonym: mandawaliya

Languages
  - Official: Hindi, Urdu
- Time zone: UTC+5:30 (IST)
- Postal code: 246749
- Telephone code: 01342
- Vehicle registration: UP 20

Mandawali is a large village town in Bijnor district block fazalpur in Tehsil Najibabad of Uttar Pradesh in India.
