= Ramganga (disambiguation) =

Ramganga is a tributary of the river Ganges, originating in Uttarakhand state, India.

Ramganga may also refer to:

- Battle of the Ramganga, battle between the Ghaznavids and the Hindu Shahis in 1020 CE
- Ramganga Dam, dam in Pauri Garhwal district, Uttarakhand
- Ramganga National Park, park in Uttarakhand
- Ramganga railway station, railway station in Bareilly district, Uttar Pradesh
- Ramganga, Patharpratima, village in West Bengal, India
