= Buchanangal =

Village in Uttar Pradesh, India

Buchanangal is a small village located in Chandpur Tehsil of Bijnor district in Uttar Pradesh, India. The village is well-connected with neighbouring villages and towns. Noorpur (Approx 07 km) and Chandpur (Approx 07 km) are the nearby towns to Buchanangal.

== Demographics ==
The village has population of 1095 of which 587 are males while 508 are females as per Population Census, 2011. These 1095 people belong to several different castes of Hinduism and one Muslim family.

== Education ==
Buchanangal has one primary school. The village has higher literacy rate compared to Uttar Pradesh. In 2011, literacy rate of Buchanangal village was 76.90% compared to 67.68% of Uttar Pradesh. In Buchanangal, Male literacy stands at 88.12% while female literacy rate was 64.30%.

== Economy ==
Farming is the main activity in Buchanangal, whereas several other activities such as small scale manufacturing (Gur), dairy, transport, etc. are carried out on a limited scale.

== Gram Panchayat ==
As per the constitution of India and the Panchyati Raaj Act, Buchanangal village is administrated by a Gram Pradhan who is elected by the Villagers.

List of Gram Pradhan:
Sl.No.	From	To	Name of Gram Pradhan
1.	2015	2021	Smt. Neeraj Yadav
2.	2021	--	Mr. Banti (In present)
