= Titarwala =

Titarwala Tittarwala
- village
- Interactive map of Titarwala
- Coordinates: 29.5360°N 78.1090°E
- Country: India
- State: Uttar Pradesh
- District: Bijnor district

Languages
  - Official: Hindi
- Time zone: UTC+5:30 (IST)
- PIN: 246721
- ISO 3166 code: RJ-IN
- Vehicle registration: RJ-

Titarwala, also written Tittarwala, is a village in the Bijnor district of Uttar Pradesh, India. A famous Shiva temple, Gauri Shankar Mandir, is located in the village. According to Census 2011 information, the location code or village code of Titarwala village is 112083. The village is 18 km from Bijnor, which is both the district and sub-district headquarter of Titarwala village. As per 2009 stats, Titarwala is the gram panchayat of Titarwala village.

The total geographical area of village is 168.75 hectares. Titarwala has a total population of 840 peoples, out of which male population is 437 while female population is 403. This results in a sex ratio of approximately 922 females for every 1,000 males. Literacy rate of titarwala village is 74.88% out of which 77.35% males and 72.21% females are literate. There are about 169 houses in titarwala village.

Bijnor is nearest town to titarwala village for all major economic activities.

== Population ==
The population details of Titarwala cover important figures like total population, male and female population, children aged 0–6 years, and the number of literate and illiterate people. It also shows how many residents belong to Scheduled Castes and Scheduled Tribes. These details help in understanding the village structure, education level, and community groups.

Particulars	Total	Male	Female
Total Population	840	437	403
Child Population (Age 0–6)	84	58	26
Scheduled Castes (SC) Population	270	143	127
Scheduled Tribes (ST) Population	N/A	N/A	N/A
Literate Population	629	338	291
Illiterate Population	211	99	112

== Gauri Shankar Mandir Titarwala ==
The ancient Gauri Shankar temple is the center of faith for Shiva devotees from hundreds of villages. It is believed that wishes are fulfilled by offering water to the Shiva lingam at the temple.

== Nearby villages of Titarwala ==
Jat Bahadurpur, Karimpur Bamnoli, Basiruhasi, Kamalpur, Padampur, Nagla Jahangir, Ganjalpur
