= Bahupura =

Bahupura Kalanpur Buzurg
- village
- Location in Uttar Pradesh, India Bahupura (India)
- Coordinates: 29.47649°N 78.28874°E
- Country: India
- State: Uttar Pradesh
- District: Bijnor

Government
  - Body: Gram panchayat

Languages
  - Official: Hindi
- Time zone: UTC+5:30 (IST)
- PIN: 246731
- Telephone code: 01342

Bahupura (officially Kalanpur Buzurg as per Tahsil records) (alternatively Bahupura Mahelki) is a community in Bijnor district in the Indian state of Uttar Pradesh. There are two villages: Bahupura and Mehlki. Most residents are farmers with more than 60% of the population engaged in agricultural work.

== History ==
According to local accounts, Bahupura village was named by a British surveyor who stayed in the village. A Bhuiyar bride (as called in Hindi "Bahu" बहु) prepared bent grass greens and rice bread (धान की रोटी) for the surveyor. Impressed by her cooking he gave the name "Bahupura" to the village.

A great social meeting was held in the village of Bahupura on date 28 May 1938 by All India Dhiman Maha Sabha (Branch District Bijnor). The conference was attended by Dhiman community (carpenter) members from across the country . The main objective of the conference was to take part in the Freedom movement of India by society. The convention was held in the mangoes garden (called as "Paudha Bag") near the village, which was located in the west of the village. Nowadays the canal is operating here.

Bahupura is surrounded by natural beauty. There are a Shiv Mandir and an old well (पुराना कुआँ) also.

== Geography ==
Bahupura village is located at 29.47649°N 78.28874°E it has an average elevation of 242 metres (794 ft). Bahupura is about 8 kilometres (5.0 mi) east from Kiratpur, 17 kilometres (11 mi) west from Nagina city, and 24 km from its District Headquarters, Bijnor.

== Gallery ==
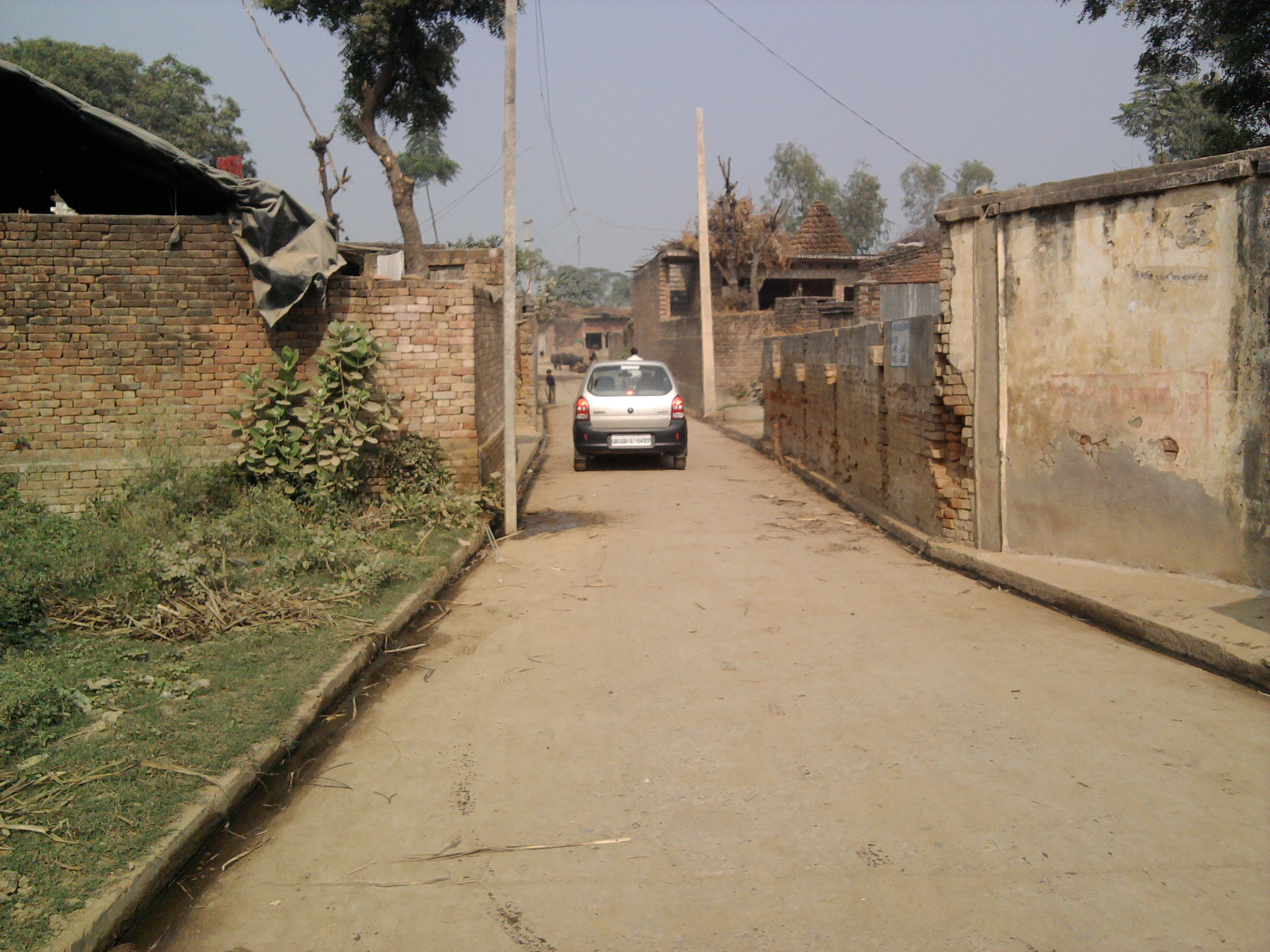
A Road in the village Bahupura (Bijnor)

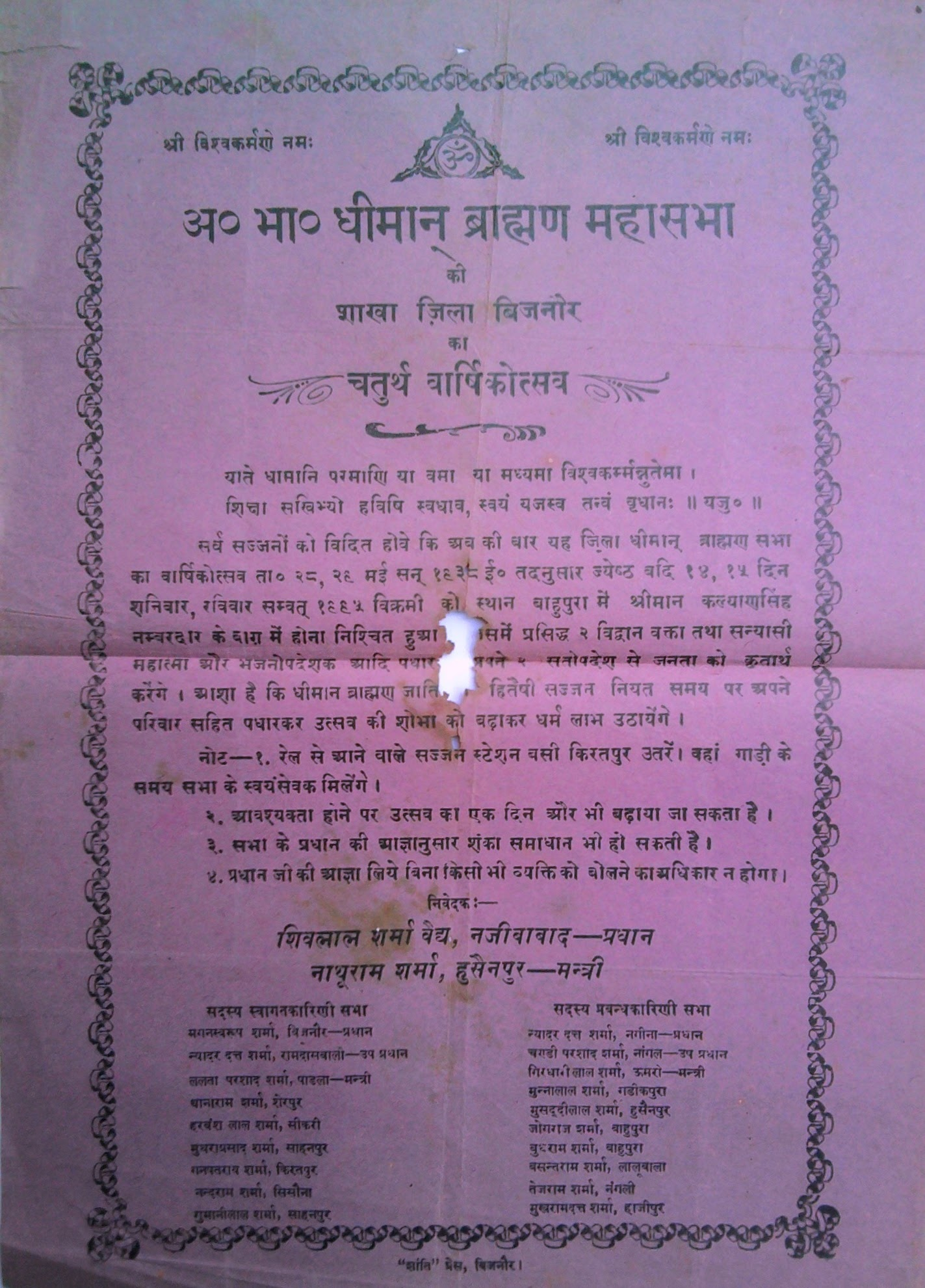
A pamphlet for Dhiman community (1938)

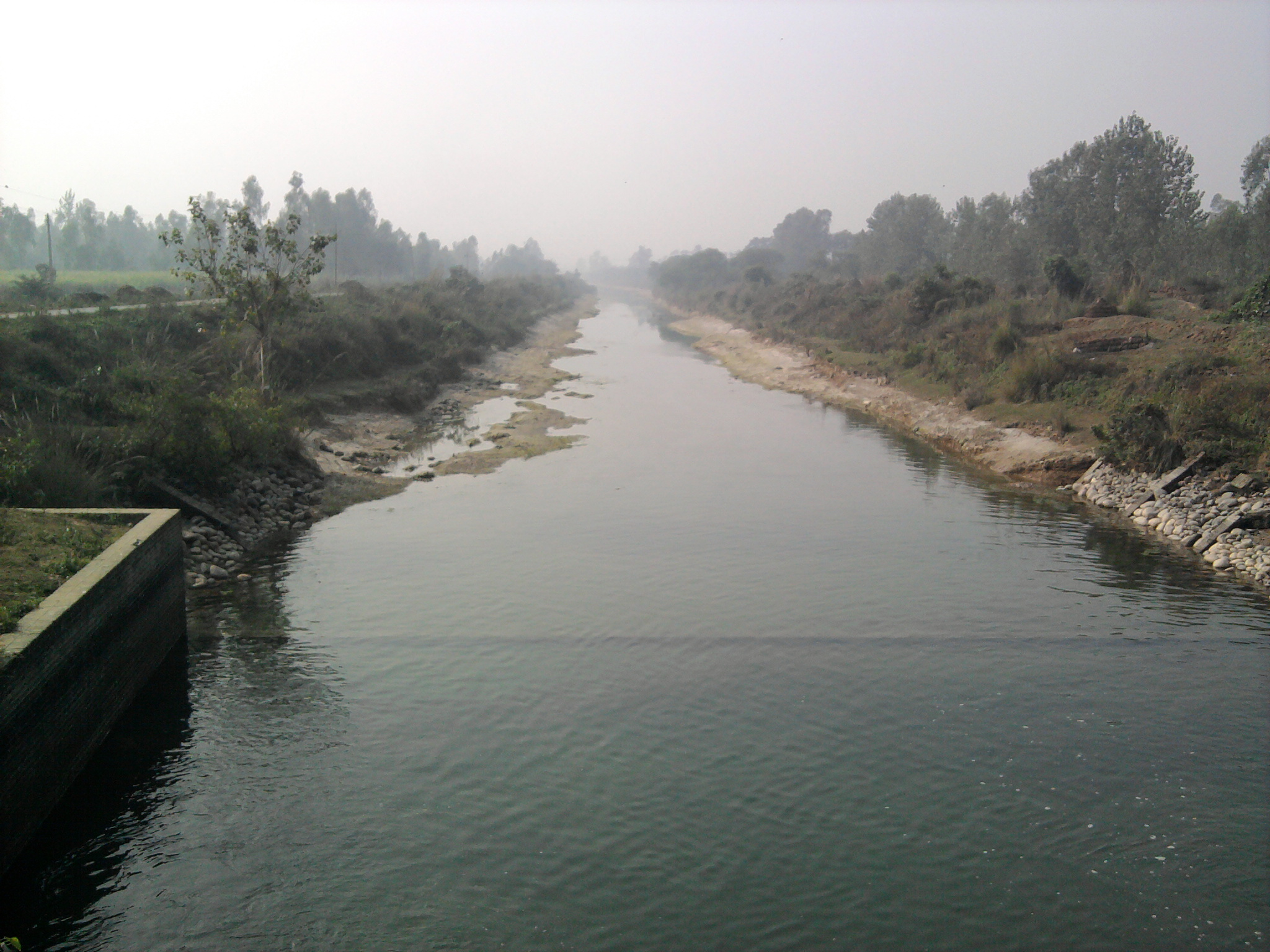
A canal near the village Bahupura

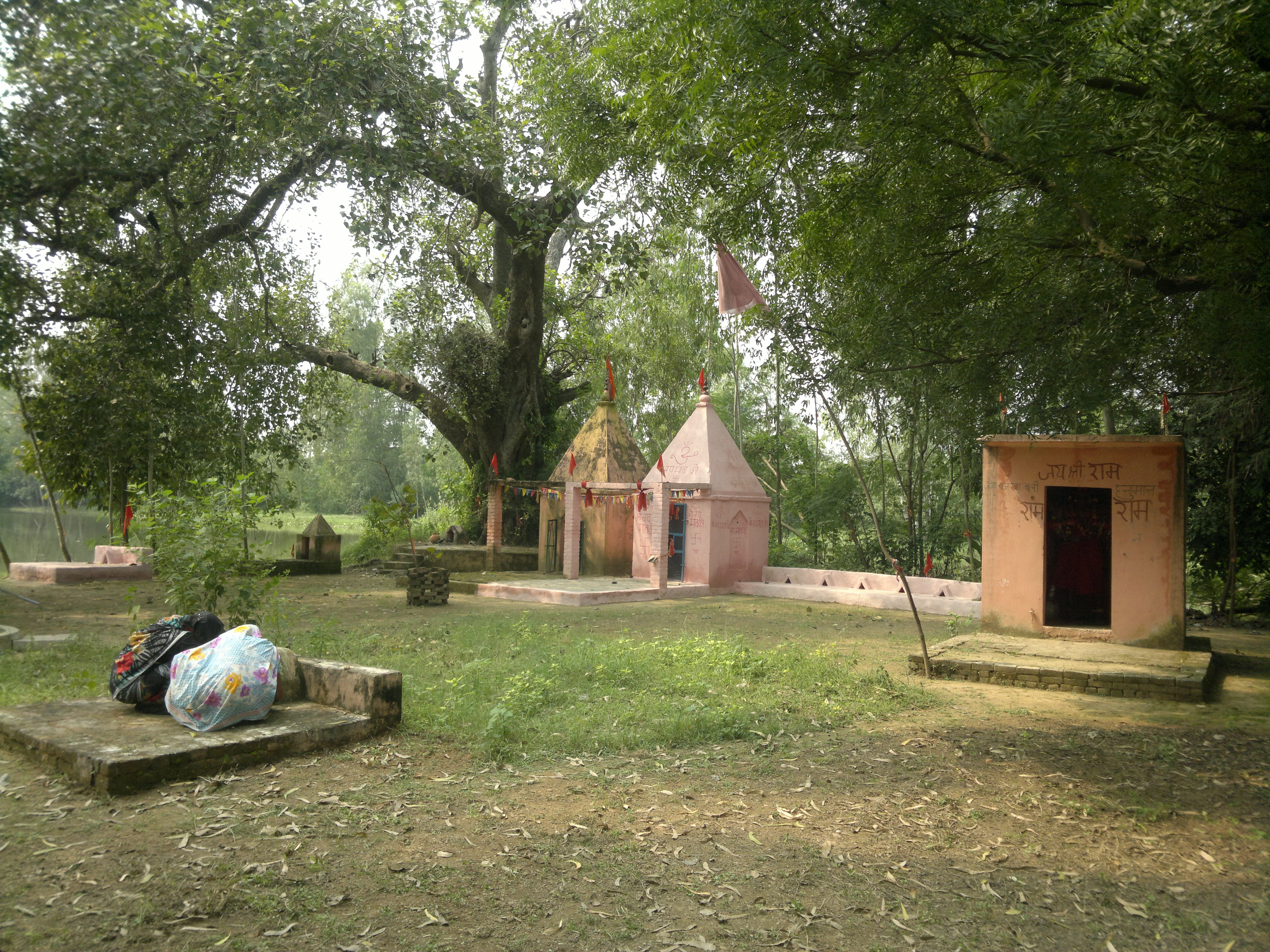
Bhuiyar women are worshiping in village Temple under old Ficus religiosa tree.

== Demography ==
The total population of Bahupura is 1275 with 680 male and 595 female as per census 2001.

== Transportation ==
The nearest railway station to Bahupura is Basi Kiratpur Railway Station (BSKR). There is no direct bus service for passengers. Commuters and villagers have to leave bus at Alampur Bus Stand.

== Schools ==
Bahupura has one primary school controlled by Government of Uttar Pradesh. The total strength of students in the school is more than one hundred.

There are a Child Welfare Center and a Post Office in the village.

== Culture ==
Bahupura is like any other village of western Uttar Pradesh in language, dress, food habits, festivals, and other traditions and ceremonial functions. The common tongue of the Bahupura people in the Hindi dialect of Western Hindi (called as "Khadi Boli, Bijnori Boli")

== See also ==
- Bijnor
- Kiratpur
- Najibabad
- Nagina
