= Aurangpur Tara =

Village in Uttar Pradesh, India

Coordinates: 29°25′N 78°11′E

- village
- Location within Uttar Pradesh Location within India
- Country: India
- State: Uttar Pradesh
- District: Bijnor
- Established: 1909; 117 years ago

Government
  - Type: Gram Panchayat Pradhan
  - Body: Gram panchayat

Area
  - Total: 16,000.13 ha (39,537.2 acres)

Population (2011)
  - Total: 2,006
  - Density: 12.54/km^{2} (32.47/sq mi)

Languages
  - Officials: Hindi, Urdu
- Time zone: UTC+5:30 (IST)
- Vehicle registration: UP 20
- Aurangpur Tara saf sutra humara

Aurangpur Tara is a large village in Bijnor district in Uttarpradesh in India Block Mohammadpur Deomal near by Bijnor city 6 km and historical village census 2011 India people 2006
