= Gajraula Shiv =

Village in Uttar Pradesh, India

- village
- Location within Uttar Pradesh Location within India
- Coordinates: 29°26′28″N 78°08′38″E
- Country: India
- District: Bijnor
- Established: 1918; 108 years ago
- Founder: abdur

Government
  - Type: Gram Panchayat Pradhan
  - Body: Gram panchayat

Area
  - Total: 18,500.12 ha (45,714.8 acres)

Population (2011)
  - Total: 1,633
  - Density: 8.827/km^{2} (22.86/sq mi)

Languages
  - Officials: Hindi, Urdu
- Time zone: UTC+5:30 (IST)
- Postal code: 246701
- Vehicle registration: UP 20

Gajraula Shiv is a village in Block Mohammadpur Deomal in Bijnor district, Uttar Pradesh, India. It had a population of 1,633 in 2011.

== Employees ==
S.N	Name	Designation	Department
1	Ashok Kumar	Gpa	Department Of Panchayati Raj
2	Gunjan Vishnoi	Asst Teacher	Department Of Education
3	Jageshwari	Headmaster	Department Of Education
4	Manoj Kumar	Leakpal	Department Of Revenue
5	Neeraj Saini	Asst Teacher	Department Of Education
6	Pushpa	Anganwadi	Department Of Women & Child Development
7	Suman Lata	Anm	Department Of Health
8	Sunita	Anganwadi	Department Of Women & Child Development

== Members ==
Gram Panchayat -(GAJRAULASHIV) : Members
S.N	Name	Designation
1	Ankur	Gram Panchayat Member
2	Banti Singh	Gram Panchayat Member
3	Deepak	Gram Panchayat Member
4	Deepa Rani	Gram Panchayat Member
5	Fehmida	Gram Panchayat Member
6	Latesh	Gram Panchayat Member
7	Magan	Gram Panchayat Member
8	Mukhtayar	Gram Panchayat Member
9	Nitesh	Gram Panchayat Member
10	Pankaj	Gram Panchayat Member
11	Reeyaj	Gram Panchayat Member
12	Shavita	Gram Panchayat Member
13	Swati	Gram Panchayat Member

== Wards ==
Gram Panchayat -(GAJRAULASHIV) : Wards
No.	Ward Name	Ward No	LGD Code
1	Ward No.1	ward no.1	2788159
2	Ward No.2	ward no.2	2788160
3	Ward No.3	ward no.3	2788161
4	Ward No.4	ward no.4	2788162
5	Ward No.5	ward no.5	2788163
6	Ward No.6	ward no.6	2788164
7	Ward No.7	ward no.7	2788165
8	Ward No.8	ward no.8	2788166
9	Ward No.9	ward no.9	2788167
10	Ward No.10	ward no.10	2788168
11	Ward No.11	ward no.11	2788169
12	Ward No.12	ward no.12	2788170
13	Ward No.13	ward no.13	2788171
14	Ward No.14	ward no.14	2788172
15	Ward No.15	ward no.15	2788173
