= Tajpuri State =

Former princely state in Gujarat, India

See Tajpuri for namesakes

Tajpuri is a town and former minor princely state in Gujarat, western India.

== History ==
The Sixth Class state in Mahi Kantha, comprising six more villages, was part of Sabar Kantha Thana. In 1901 it had a combined population of 1,574, yielding a state revenue of 4,090 Rupees (1903–4, mostly from land), paying two tributes: 600 Rupees tribute to the Gaekwar Baroda State and 186 Rupees to Idar State.

== External links and Sources ==
- Imperial Gazetteer on dsal.uchicago.edu - Mahi Kantha

== See also ==
- Tejpura (disambiguation)
