= Ulakhpur =

Ulakpur
- Village
- India Uttar Pradesh
- Coordinates: 29.46°N 78.16°E
- Country: India
- State: Uttar Pradesh
- District: Bijnor
- Block: Mohammadpur Deomal
- Established: 1900; 126 years ago
- Founder: ulakuddin

Government
  - Type: Gram Panchayat Pradhan
  - Body: Gram panchayat
  - Pradhan: kale
- Elevation: 550 m (1,800 ft)

Population (2011)
  - Total: 1,737
- Demonym: Ulakpuriya

Languages
  - Official: Hindi, Urdu, Kauravi dialect
- Time zone: UTC+5:30 (IST)
- Postal code: 246701
- Telephone code: 01342
- Vehicle registration: UP 20

Ulakpur also known as Alakpur is a small village near National Highway 34 in Bijnor district block Mohammadpur Deomal of Uttar Pradesh in India.

Religions in ulakpur (2011)
Religion	Percent
Hindus	0.1%
Muslims	99.9%
