= Mukrampur Khema =

- Census town
- Interactive map of Mukrampur Khema
- Coordinates: 29.371°N 78.144°E
- Country: India
- State: Uttar Pradesh
- District: Bijnor

Population (2001)
  - Total: 11,127

Languages
  - Official: Hindi
- Time zone: UTC+5:30 (IST)
- Vehicle registration: UP
- Website: up.gov.in

Mukrampur Khema is a census town in Bijnor district in the Indian state of Uttar Pradesh.

== Demographics ==
As of 2001 India census, Mukrampur Khema had a population of 11,127. Males constitute 53% of the population and females 47%. Mukrampur Khema has an average literacy rate of 52%, lower than the national average of 59.5%: male literacy is 57%, and female literacy is 47%. In Mukrampur Khema, 20% of the population is under 6 years of the age.
