= Askaripur =

- Village
- Location in Uttar Pradesh, India
- Coordinates: 29.7°N 78.27°E
- Country: India
- State: Uttar Pradesh
- District: Bijnor
- Founder: Raja Askarandev Singh Chauhan

Government
  - Body: Gram panchayat
  - District Magistrate: Ms. Ramakant Pandey
- Elevation: 127 m (417 ft)

Population (2001)
  - Total: 7,261

Languages
  - Official: Hindi
- Time zone: UTC+5:30 (IST)
- PIN: 246727
- Telephone code 01345: 0515
- Vehicle registration: UP-20

The village of Askaripur is located in Bijnor District in Uttar Pradesh, India between Noorpur and Moradabad. It is approximately 45 km from Bijnor. It is connected to these two cities by roadways. The nearest airport is at New Delhi about 150 km from Askaripur.

== History ==
Askaripur was founded by Raja Askarandev Singh Chauhan younger brother of Maharaja Gajanandev singh Deora in the 16th century. Even till now Askaripur was considered an estate . Earlier the Rajputs of Askaripur who were the true descendent of the Raja Askaran were called Chaudhari and later Thakur . Some were even gifted by the title of Rais under the British Rule .

In 1942, Thakur Rikkhi Singh, Son of Hori Singh, was the resident of Askaripur who attained martyrdom in the independence movement due to exchange of firing between the Noorpur Police and Revolutionists . A Mela is held every year in his memory and in 2017 his statue is installed in Noorpur city .

British rule recognized Askaripur individuality and allowed the thakurs (aka. Chaudhari) to have their own jurisdiction under certain rules and the Kachari( a type of court) continued to held even in the British period .

"Askaripur landmark is the gate which stands at the point where the road meets the highway. This Gate was built in the Memory of Thakur Ramchandra Singh who had the title of Rais . It is higher village The village also has concrete roads with in the village.

The village has 100% literacy rate. It also has the distinction of being a "Nirmal Gram".

The present government has also sanctioned the construction of a water tank for the water supply within the village.

Recent local development in the village includes the construction of paved cement concrete (CC) roads and systematic infrastructure improvements, alongside community-led initiatives such as the erection of an ornamental village entrance gate.

== Geography ==
Askaripur is located at 29.7°N 78.27°E. Askaripur lies in the plains of Ganges and hence the land is highly fertile. Soil found is mostly Alluvial.

Askaripur lies in the jurisdiction of Noorpur block, division Chandpur.

== Demographics ==
As of 2001 India census, Askaripur had a population of 4,175. Males constitute 53.5% of the population and females 46.5%. Number of households were 664.

== Education ==
Askaripur has a Government aided Inter College. Askaripur has two Government primary school and some private primary schools.

== Important People ==
1. Dr. Ashok Kumar Chauhan – The Founder of Amity University and Institutions

== See also ==
- Chandpur
- Noorpur
- Bijnor
- Uttar Pradesh
