= Bijnor Rural =

Village in Uttar Pradesh, India

Coordinates: 29.3626678°N 78.1134202°E

- Village
- Location within Uttar Pradesh Location within India
- Country: India
- State: Uttar Pradesh
- District: Bijnor
- Established: 1890; 136 years ago

Government
  - Type: Gram Panchayat Pradhan
  - Body: Gram panchayat

Area
  - Total: 9,000.13 ha (22,239.8 acres)

Population (2011)
  - Total: 3,432
  - Density: 38.13/km^{2} (98.76/sq mi)

Languages
  - Officials: Hindi, Urdu
- Time zone: UTC+5:30 (IST)
- Postal code: 246701
- Vehicle registration: UP 20

Bijnor Rural is a large village in Bijnor district, Uttar Pradesh, India. It is part of Bijnor and Gram Panchayat. According to a 2011 census, its population is 3432.
