= Khwajgipur =

Coordinates: 29°34′N 78°06′E

Khwajgipur is a village in Bijnor district in Uttar Pradesh state, India. Nearby villages are Ramjiwala, Bahadarpur-Jat, Bilaspur (Sadakpur) and Kishanpur. The population of Khwajgipur is about 150.
