= Amipur Sudha =

Village in Uttar Pradesh, India

- village
- Location within Uttar Pradesh Location within India
- Coordinates: 29°26′02″N 78°07′57″E
- Country: India
- State: Uttar Pradesh
- District: Bijnor
- Established: 1916; 110 years ago

Government
  - Type: Gram Panchayat Pradhan
  - Body: Gram panchayat

Area
  - Total: 9,919.29 ha (24,511.1 acres)

Population (2011)
  - Total: 2,920
  - Density: 29.4/km^{2} (76.2/sq mi)

Languages
  - Officials: Hindi, Urdu
- Time zone: UTC+5:30 (IST)
- Postal code: 246764
- Vehicle registration: UP 20

Amipur Sudha, also known as Jamdarpur, is a large village in Bijnor district, Uttar Pradesh, India. It is in the Mohammadpur Deomal block, near the Dehradun–Bijnor Road. Its population in 2011 was 2,920.
