= Alampur, Gujarat =

Human settlement in Gujarat, India

Coordinates: 21.95°N 71.77°E

Alampur is a town and former Rajput petty princely state on Saurashtra peninsula, in Gujarat, western India.

== History ==
The princely state, in Gohilwar prant, was ruled by Gohil Rajput Chieftains. During the British Raj, it was in the charge of the colonial Eastern Kathiawar Agency.

It comprised only the single village, with a population of 497 in 1901, yielding 32,000 Rupees state revenue (1903–04, mostly from land), paying 4,915 Rupees tribute to the Gaekwar Baroda State and Junagadh State.

== External links and Sources ==
- Imperial Gazetteer, on DSAL.UChicago.edu - Kathiawar
