= Tejpura =

Tejpura may refer to the following places in India:

- Tejpura State, a former princely state in Mahi Kantha, Gujarat
- a village in Mahesana Taluka, Mehsana District, Gujarat, presumably formerly seat of the above petty state
- a village in Aurangabad district, Bihar

== See also ==
- Tajpur (disambiguation)
- Tajpuri (disambiguation)
- Tezpur, a city in Assam, India
