= Baruki =

Village in Uttar Pradesh, India

- village
- Location within Uttar Pradesh Location within India
- Coordinates: 29°24′23″N 78°15′45″E
- Country: India
- State: Uttar Pradesh
- District: Bijnor
- Established: 1902; 124 years ago
- Founder: Jamil barooki

Government
  - Type: Gram Panchayat Pradhan
  - Body: Gram panchayat

Area
  - Total: 9,010.12 ha (22,264.5 acres)

Population (2011)
  - Total: 5,366
  - Density: 59.56/km^{2} (154.2/sq mi)

Languages
  - Officials: Hindi, Urdu
- Time zone: UTC+5:30 (IST)
- Postal code: 246764
- Vehicle registration: UP 20
- Barooki humara saaf hai

Baruki is a large village in Bijnor district, Uttar Pradesh, India, near by National Highway Nagina and Bijnor Road
