= Linderpur =

Linderpur Nanderpur
- Village
- Location in Bijnor Uttar Pradesh, India Linderpur (India)
- Coordinates: 29.3724422°N 78.1358472°E
- Country: India
- State: Uttar Pradesh
- Bijnor: Bijnor

Government
  - Type: Panchayat raj
  - Body: Gram panchayat
- Elevation: 265 m (869 ft)

Population (2011)
  - Total: 3,174
- Sex ratio 1000/924 ♂/♀

Languages
  - Official: Bijnori
- Time zone: UTC+5:30 (IST)
- PIN: 246734
- Telephone Code: 01345
- ISO 3166 code: IN-UP
- Vehicle registration: UP 20 XX XXXX
- Post Office: Ratangarh
- Website: http://bijnor.nic.in/

Linderpur is a village that is governed by Panchayat law in the Bijnor district of the Indian state of Uttar Pradesh. It is located on State Highway 77. The historical local name of the village was Nanderpur. Shobhit Chauhan is the current Pradhan and Sarpanch of the village.

== Geography ==
It belongs to the Moradabad division and is situated on both sides of Uttar Pradesh State Highway (U.P.S.H.)No:77. It is a central hub For nearly villages which are connected through Linderpur - Dharupur Link Road. Most travel to surrounding villages passes through it. It is 43 km south of the district headquarters in Bijnor, 11 km from tehsil headquarter Chandpur, 5 km from neighbouring block town Noorpur, 417 km from the state capital Lucknow and 138 km from the national capital New Delhi. The elevation of this area is approximately 869 feet above sea level

== Economy ==
The main activities of this village include cane plants, cane crushers, brickworks, wood-razing and bakeries. One recent development is a central market which extends from the primary school to Harcharan Singh Market on Main Amroha road.

== Education ==
It has a government-run primary and junior school. It has also one private educational institution, Manbhavan Sarvjanik Children Academy which is up to class X.
