= Naseeri =

Village in Uttar Pradesh, India

- village
- Location within Uttar Pradesh Location within India
- Coordinates: 29°24′28″N 78°10′58″E
- Country: India
- District: Bijnor
- Established: 1908; 118 years ago
- Founder: zamidar ilam khan

Government
  - Type: Gram Panchayat Pradhan
  - Body: Gram panchayat

Area
  - Total: 9,050.12 ha (22,363.3 acres)

Population (2011)
  - Total: 610
  - Density: 6.7/km^{2} (17/sq mi)

Languages
  - Officials: Hindi, Urdu
- Time zone: UTC+5:30 (IST)
- Vehicle registration: UP 20

Naseeri is a village in Mohammadpur Deomal block, Bijnor district, Uttar Pradesh, India.

== Members Employees ==
S.N	Name	Designation	Department
1	Bala Singh	Asst Teacher	Department Of Education
2	Dharampal Singh	Leakpal	Department Of Revenue
3	Mithlesh	Anm	Department Of Health
4	Nirbhaye Kumar	Gpa	Department Of Panchayati Raj
5	Pritham	Anganwadi	Department Of Women & Child Development
6	Reena	Asst Teacher	Department Of Education
7	Seema	Headmaster	Department Of Education

== Members ==
Gram Panchayat - NASEERI (NASEERI) : Members
S.N	Name	Designation
1	Anil	Gram Panchayat Member
2	Anita	Gram Panchayat Member
3	Ankul	Gram Panchayat Member
4	Baita	Gram Panchayat Member
5	Bobiraj	Gram Panchayat Member
6	Deepa	Gram Panchayat Member
7	Dipanshu	Gram Panchayat Member
8	Kesar	Gram Panchayat Member
9	Pitam	Gram Panchayat Member
10	Pratam	Gram Panchayat Member

== Wards ==
No.	Ward Name	Ward No	LGD Code
1	Ward No 1	1	2768086
2	Ward No 2	2	2768087
3	Ward No 3	3	2768088
4	Ward No 4	4	2768089
5	Ward No 5	5	2768090
6	Ward No 6	6	2768091
7	Ward No 7	7	2768092
8	Ward No 8	8	2768093
9	Ward No 9	9	2768094
10	Ward No 10	10	2768095
11	Ward No 11	11	2768096
