= Tajpuri =

Tajpuri may refer to:

Places

- Tajpuri State, a former princely state in Mahi Kantha, and its seat in Gujarat, India
- a village in Shirpur Taluka, Dhule District, Maharashtra, central India
- a Mohallah (quarter) in Dina, Pakistani Punjab

Other

- a synonym for the Bengali–Assamese Rangpuri language, notably in Nepal
- Tajpuri Baloch, a prominent Baluch family in the Doab region of Uttar Pradesh, northern India

== See also ==
- Tajpur (disambiguation)
- Tejpura (disambiguation)
