= Umri, Bijnor =

Village in Uttar Pradesh, India

umri
- village
- Location within Uttar Pradesh Location within India
- Country: India
- State: Uttar Pradesh
- District: Bijnor
- Established: 1800; 226 years ago
- Founder: Haji Abdul Ajez Mansoori

Government
  - Type: Gram Panchayat Pradhan
  - Body: Gram panchayat
  - Pradhan: Naved Mansoori ibn e Ishakh

Area
  - Total: 9,009.12 ha (22,262.0 acres)

Population (2011)
  - Total: 1,778
  - Density: 19.74/km^{2} (51.11/sq mi)

Languages
  - Officials: Hindi, Urdu
- Time zone: UTC+5:30 (IST)
- Vehicle registration: UP 20
- umri humara saf hai

Umri is a village in Bijnor district, Uttar Pradesh, India. According to the 2011 Census of India, it had a population of 1,778.
