= Pakhanpur =

Coordinates: 29°45′N 77°12′E

Pakhanpur is a village in Nagina, Bijnor district, Uttar Pradesh, India. Pincode of Pakhanpur is 246762. Head (Pradhan) of Village Pakhanpur is Amit Chauhan

== Population ==
According to 2011 census the population of Pakhanpur was 933.

=== Male Female Population of 2011 ===
	Total	Male	Female
Total	933	504	429
Child (0–6)	124	67	57
SC	95	51	44
ST	0	0	0
Literacy	76.76%	84.21%	68.01%
Total Workers	223	199	24
Main Worker	188	-	-
Marginal Worker	35	26	9
