= Haldaur =

Town in Bijnor district, Uttar Pradesh, India

- town
- Location in Uttar Pradesh, India Haldaur (India)
- Coordinates: 29.291°N 78.283°E
- Country: India
- State: Uttar Pradesh
- District: Bijnor
- Founded by: Raja Harvansh Singh

Area
  - Total: 6 km^{2} (2.3 sq mi)
- Elevation: 220 m (720 ft)

Population (2011)
  - Total: 19,567
  - Density: 3,300/km^{2} (8,400/sq mi)

Languages
  - Official: Hindi
- Time zone: UTC+5:30 (IST)
- Postal code: 246726
- Vehicle registration: UP-20
- Website: up.gov.in

Haldaur is a town and a municipal board in Bijnor district in the Indian state of Uttar Pradesh.

== Geography ==
Haldaur is located at 29.3°N 78.28°E. It has an average elevation of 220 metres (721 feet).

Haldaur is close to the district headquarters and well connected by road as well as rails. Mussoorie Express, Siddhbali Jan Shatabdi Express and Chandigarh Lucknow Express pass through the Haldaur railway station.

The town is located on the Panipat khatima State highway. The capital of India, New Delhi is just about 175 kilometers awat from the town.

== Demographics ==
As of 2001 India census, Haldaur had a population of 19,567. Males constitute 53% of the population and females 47%. Haldaur has an average literacy rate of 71%, higher than the national average of 59.5%: male literacy is 78%, and female literacy is 64%. In Haldaur, 15% of the population is under 6 years of age.

Religions in Haldaur
Religion	Percent
Hindus	75%
Muslims	25%
Jains	0.0%
Others†	0.00%
Distribution of religions †Includes Sikhs (10%), Buddhists (<0.2%).
