= Saibaba Goud =

Indian ophthalmologist

Alampur Saibaba Goud
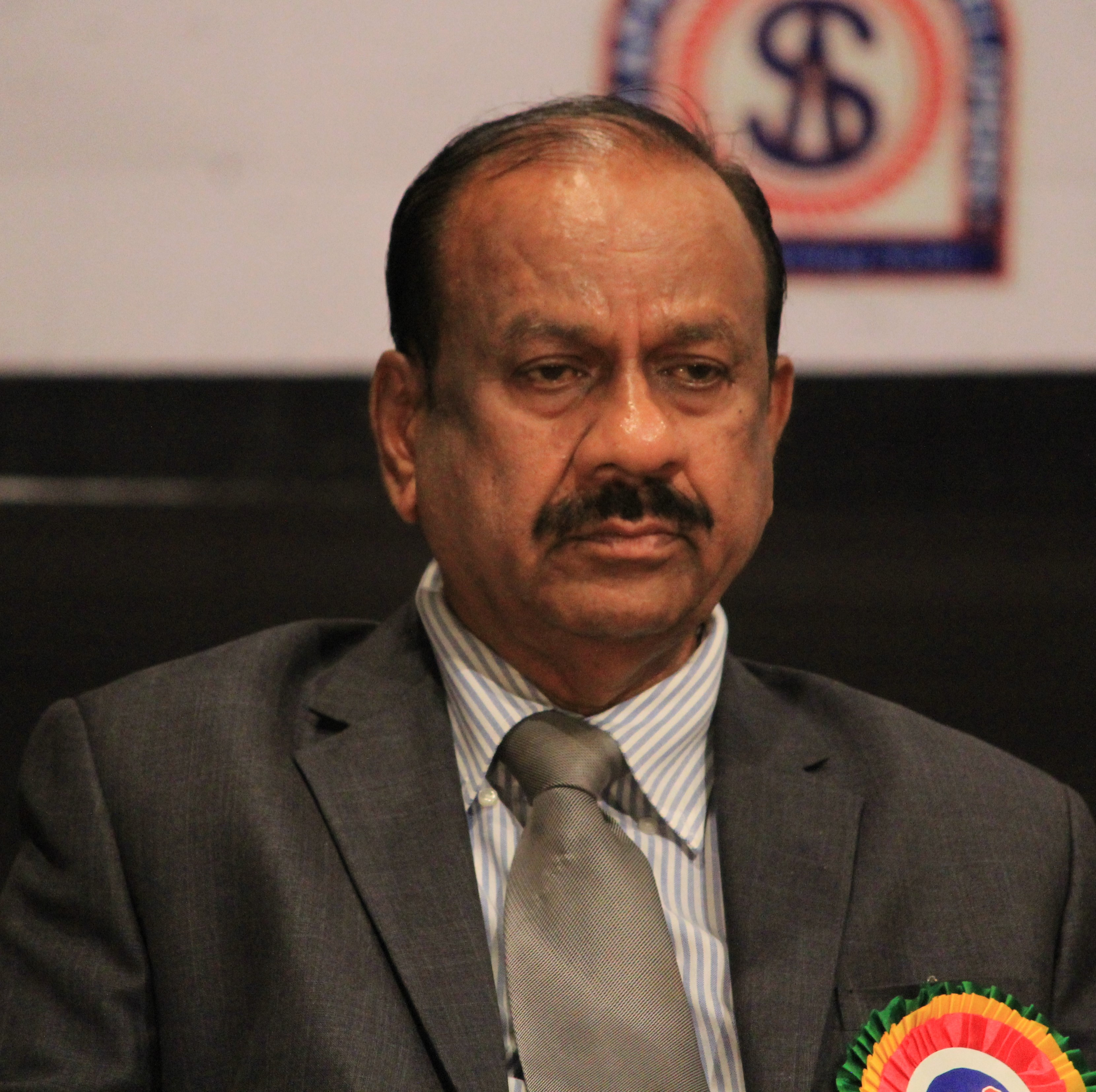
- May 2017
- Born: India
- Occupations: Ophthalmologist, philanthropist
- Known for: Devnar Foundation for the Blind

Alampur Saibaba Goud is an Indian ophthalmologist and founder-chairman of the Devnar Foundation for the Blind. He is also a social entrepreneur, and active in the voluntary organization at Secunderabad in Telangana, a state of India. He works in the field of providing aid to visually challenged and visually disabled children in India.

He had won awards for his work and has written several books and articles for the blind in English and Telugu newspapers and journals. He does educational radio talks broadcast on the Doordarshan network in India.

== Professional life ==
Goud is president of the National Society for the Prevention of Blindness (NSPB) in the state of Andhra Pradesh, and Professor and Head of the Department of Ophthalmology at Osmania Medical College at Hyderabad. He is the Founder-trustee of Devnar Foundation for the Blind and chairman of the Andhra Pradesh Cricket Association for the Blind.

== Activist for the blind community of Andhra Pradesh ==
Goud leads the Devnar Foundation (founded in 1991) in their efforts to provide opportunities and infrastructure essential to integrating the visually impaired into society as productive adults. Through the foundation, vision-disabled people are provided accommodation, schools, and vocational programs to become self-employed or work in the private sector. The foundation provides computer training and facilities for extracurricular activities such as cricket, chess, music and dance.

The foundation is attempting to organise a Polytechnic engineering college for the blind through various affiliations. It provides medical care for sight-related needs of children along with parental counseling and genetic counseling. The Foundation manages the Ramananda Centre for Advanced Learning and Research for visually impaired vocational training and provides CBR programs, and operates Braille printing presses.

=== Success stories ===
Companies that have supported the efforts of Foundation include GE, Dell, and Oracle Corporation. The employees of GE hold entertainment and story telling programs which help the children feel that they are a part of normal society. Some of these companies have volunteered to recruit students once they graduate. The Government of India provides a 1% reservation for the blind.

== Awards ==
- Padma Shri in Medicine
- He is the first ever recipient of the Indian ophthalmologic award - the national award Ph.D. given by Osmania University
- Dr K. R. Dutta award for exemplary work in the field of Ophthalmology community
- Drishti Pradatha Award
- Rastriya Gaurav Award
- J. S. Mahashadba Award by the All Indian Ophthalmological Society.
- Award for a film on glaucoma by the All Indian Ophthalmologoical Society
- E. V. Srinivasan Award

== Author ==
Goud is the author of several books.

- Nayanabhiramam in Telugu
- Meeru-Mee Kanulu in Telugu for neo-literates for eye care.
- The Organ of the Sight in English
