= Raja Ka Tajpur =

- Municipality
- Location in Uttar Pradesh, India
- Coordinates: 29.22°N 78.58°E
- Country: India
- State: Uttar Pradesh
- District: Bijnor
- Elevation: 211 m (692 ft)

Population (2020)
  - Total: 51,653

Languages
  - Official: Hindi
- Time zone: UTC+5:30 (IST)
- PIN: 246735
- Telephone code: 01344
- Vehicle registration: UP 20

Raja Ka Tajpur is a city and a municipal board in Bijnor district in the Indian state of Uttar Pradesh.

== Geography ==
Tajpur is located at 29.22°N 78.58°E. It has an average elevation of 211 metres (692 feet).

== Religious places ==
Sacred Heart Church, Tajpur
