= Tajpur, Kapurthala =

Tajpur
- Village
- Location in Punjab, India Tajpur (India)
- Coordinates: 31.490269°N 75.408031°E
- Country: India
- State: Punjab
- District: Kapurthala

Government
  - Type: Panchayati raj (India)
  - Body: Gram panchayat

Population (2011)
  - Total: 669
- Sex ratio 345/324♂/♀

Languages
  - Official: Punjabi
  - Other spoken: Hindi
- Time zone: UTC+5:30 (IST)
- PIN: 144802
- Telephone code: 01822
- ISO 3166 code: IN-PB
- Vehicle registration: PB-09
- Website: kapurthala.gov.in

Tajpur is a village in Kapurthala district of Punjab State, India. It is located 14 kilometres (8.7 mi) from Kapurthala, which is both district and sub-district headquarters of Tajpur. The village is administrated by a Sarpanch who is an elected representative of village as per the constitution of India and Panchayati raj (India).

== Demography ==
According to the report published by Census India in 2011, Tajpur has 122 houses with the total population of 669 persons of which 345 are male and 324 females. Literacy rate of Tajpur is 76.33%, higher than the state average of 75.84%. The population of children in the age group 0–6 years is 48 which is 7.17% of the total population. Child sex ratio is approximately 1000, higher than the state average of 846.

== Population data ==
Particulars	Total	Male	Female
Total No. of Houses	122	-	-
Population	669	345	324
Child (0–6)	48	24	24
Schedule Caste	383	201	182
Schedule Tribe	0	0	0
Literacy	76.33 %	82.87 %	69.33 %
Total Workers	222	209	13
Main Worker	219	0	0
Marginal Worker	3	1	2
