= Kiratpur, Mainpuri =

Village in Uttar Pradesh, India

Kiratpur
- Village
- Location in Uttar Pradesh, India
- Coordinates: 27.15725°N 78.98744°E
- Country: India
- State: Uttar Pradesh
- District: Mainpuri
- Tehsil: Mainpuri

Area
  - Total: 2.693 km^{2} (1.040 sq mi)

Population (2011)
  - Total: 865
  - Density: 321/km^{2} (832/sq mi)
- Time zone: UTC+5:30 (IST)

Kiratpur (Kiratpur) is a village in Mainpuri block of Mainpuri district, Uttar Pradesh, India. As of 2011, it had a population of 865, in 144 households.

== Demographics ==
As of 2011, Kiratpur had a population of 865, in 144 households. This population was 53.4% male (462) and 46.6% female (403). The 0-6 age group numbered 127 (64 male and 63 female), or 14.7% of the total population. 379 residents were members of Scheduled Castes, or 43.8% of the total.

The 1981 census recorded Kiratpur as having a population of 594 people, in 106 households.

The 1961 census recorded Kiratpur as comprising 1 hamlet, with a total population of 456 people (244 male and 212 female), in 87 households and 74 physical houses. The area of the village was given as 715 acres.

== Infrastructure ==
As of 2011, Kiratpur had 2 primary schools; it did not have any healthcare facilities. Drinking water was provided by well, hand pump, and tube well; there were no public toilets. The village had a post office but no public library; there was at least some access to electricity for all purposes. Streets were made of kachcha materials.
