= Hamid Afaq Qureshi =

Hamid Afaq Qureshi also known as Hamid Afaq Qureshi Al–Taimi–Al–Qureshi, is a historian Shaikh Siddiqi of Arabic, Persian and Urdu descent. He was born in 1945 in Bijnor, Uttar Pradesh, India.

Qureshi studied science at the university level. He joined a scientific organisation in 1965 and retired as a gazetted officer in 2005. During his service, he graduated from Delhi University with an art degree. He received a postgraduate degree in history and political science from the University of Rajasthan, Jaipur. He earned his PhD in history from Lucknow University.

== Career ==
Many of Qureshi's works have been published by New Royal Book Company, Lucknow. They include Iqbal 1873–1938, The Flickers of an Independent Nawabi: Wazir Ali Khan of Avadh (2 Vols.), The Mughals, The English and the Rulers of Awadh: A Kaleidoscopic Study., 1857: Classics: Volume I: Khandang-i-Ghadar and Naunaga (translations) and many other works.
