= Tajpur, Bhongir mandal =

Tajpur Tajpur
- village
- Location in Telangana, India Tajpur (India)
- Coordinates: 17.5197925°N 78.819725°E
- Country: India
- State: Telangana
- District: Yadadri Bhuvanagiri district

Government
  - Type: Panchayati raj (India)
  - Body: Gram panchayat

Languages
  - Official: Telugu
- Time zone: UTC+5:30 (IST)
- PIN: 508116
- Telephone code: 08720
- Vehicle registration: TS 30
- Nearest city bhongiri district head quarter: Hyderabad
- Lok Sabha constituency: Bhongiri
- Vidhan Sabha constituency: Bhongiri
- Website: telangana.gov.in

Tajpur is a village in Yadadri Bhuvanagiri district of Telangana, India. It falls under Bhongir mandal. It will village have an old name as Mudampalli.
