= Noorpur, Uttar Pradesh =

Noorpur
- Municipality
- Location in Uttar Pradesh, India Noorpur (India)
- Coordinates: 29°09′N 78°24′E
- Country: India
- State: Uttar Pradesh
- District: Bijnor
- Elevation: 275 m (902 ft)

Population (2011)
  - Total: 38,806

Languages
  - Official: Hindi
- Time zone: UTC+5:30 (IST)
- PIN: 246734
- Telephone code: 01345
- Vehicle registration: UP 20 XX XXXX
- Website: up.gov.in

Noorpur is a city and a Municipal Board in Bijnor District in the Indian State of Uttar Pradesh.

== Demographics ==
The Noorpur Nagar Palika Parishad has a total population of 38,806 of which 20,044 are males while 18,762 are females, as per report released by 2011 Census of India.

Population of children with age of 0–6 is 5713 or 14.72% of the total population of Noorpur (NPP). In Noorpur Nagar Palika Parishad, the female sex ratio is 936 against state average of 912. Moreover, the child sex ratio in Noorpur is around 891 compared to Uttar Pradesh state average of 902. The literacy rate of Noorpur city is 75.40% higher than the state average of 67.68%. In Noorpur, male literacy is around 82.32% while the female literacy rate is 68.06%.

Population of this town is: Muslims62.87 %, Hindus 27.78%, Sikh 9.12%, Christians 0.20%, and Others 0.03%.

Noorpur Nagar Palika Parishad has total administration over 6,175 houses to which it supplies basic amenities like water and sewerage. It is also authorized to build roads within Nagar Palika Parishad limits and impose taxes on properties coming under its jurisdiction.

Nearby villages are :

(A) On Amroha road Linderpur, Jafrabad, Tangrola, Ratangarh, Feena (B) On Bijnor road Kikkar Khajuri, Khaspura, Pawti (C) On Chandpur road Azampur urf Aadopur, Dhoondli Tabibpur, Biral (D) ON Dhampur road Dhoulagarh, Morna (E) On Moradabad road Hasupura, Asgaripur, Gohawar Jait & Gohawar Hallu, Daulatpur (F) On Seohara road Boorhpur, Raja Ka Tajpur.

All these villages are mainly dependent on Noorpur Town as they come to purchase most of items from here.

Religion in Noorpur (2011)
1. Islam (62.9%)
2. Hinduism (27.8%)
3. Sikhism (9.12%)
4. Christianity (0.20%)
5. Other (0.03%)

== Education ==
Noorpur have a wide variety of schools and colleges from government schools to high fee private schools. From private colleges to government degree colleges. Also as Noorpur is well connected to nearby big cities such as Moradabad and Bijnor, student from Noorpur visit these cities also for education purpose.

== Location ==
Noorpur is connected by the SH-76 Moradabad District to Bijnor & SH-77 Amroha to Najibabad & SH-147 Hastinapur to Jaspur.Three state highways SH-76, SH-77, SH-147 pass through the town. The distance of Noorpur from Delhi is 160 km. It is 80 km from Meerut, 160 km from Dehradun, 60 km from Jim Corbett National Park. The nearest railway station Chandpur and junction is Moradabad. Nearest hill station is Lansdowne, Uttarakhand, cantonment town in Uttarakhand and It is approximately 101 km from Noorpur. Some other nearest hill stations are Mussoorie 185 km, and Nainital 150 km from Noorpur. The Holy city of temples Haridwar is 90 km from Noorpur on the way to Dehradun

There are direct bus services between New Delhi and Noorpur, with buses connecting to the Vivekanand Bus Terminal, Anand Vihar, New Delhi. Buses are available to some other locations as well at Delhi.

- Anand Vihar – Noorpur
- Okhla – Noorpur
- Shahdra – Noorpur
- Delhi 6 – Noorpur
- Kalka Lane – Noorpur

There are direct bus services between

- Moradabad – Noorpur – Bijnor (Every 7 minutes)
- Noorpur – Dhampur (Every 5–7 minutes)
- Noorpur – Chandpur (Every 10 minutes)
- Noorpur – Naugawan - Amroha (Every 10 minutes)
- Delhi – Chandpur – Noorpur – Dhampur (Every 30 minutes)
- Delhi – Chandpur – Noorpur – Dhampur - Sharkot - Afzalgarh - Kalagarh (Every 90 minutes)
- Amroha – Noorpur – Nathaur – Najibabad – Haridwar (Every 30 minutes)
- Moradabad – Noorpur – Bijnor – Muzaffarnagar- Shamli - kerana - Panipat (Every 45 minutes)
- Bijnor – Noorpur – Moradabad – Rampur – Bareilly – Pilibhit (Every Morning )
- Haridwar – Najibabad – Noorpur (Every 25 minutes)
- Moradabad – Noorpur (Every 5 minutes)
- Dehradun – Haridwar – Najibabad – Noorpur – Moradabad – Rampur – Bareilly – Lucknow - Gorakhpur (Morning & Evening Services)
- Noorpur - Najibabad - Haridwar - Rishikesh (One bus service everyday)
- Panipat - Shamli - Muzaffarnagar- Bijnor - Noorpur - Moradabad - Rampur - Rudrapur - Haldwani - Kathgodam
- Saharanpur – Deoband – Muzaffarnagar – Bijnor - Noorpur- Moradabad
