= Tejpura State =

Former princely state in Gujarat, India

See Tejpura for namesakes

Tejpura is a town, apparently in Mahesana Taluka, Mehsana District, and former minor princely state in Gujarat, western India.
