= Pheona =

Village in Uttar Pradesh, India

Coordinates: 29°05′N 78°21′E

Pheona or Pheena is a village in the northwestern Rohilkhand region of Uttar Pradesh state of India. It is located in the administrative district of Bijnor Spelling Feena, Funa, Phuna, Phoona, also may appear in some old records.

The distance of Pheona from the district headquarters is about 50 kilometers. Pheona is surrounded by a metalled road from all sides. Uttarapath, one of the three biggest routes of the early Vedic period, passed through here. Currently the State High Way 77 passes through Pheona.

== History ==
According to the records kept by the families of this 320-year-old village, it was settled by two soldiers who were part of the armada assembled on the request of king of Haridwar. He had sent out a request various kingdoms of now Rajasthan to settle a complaint made by holy men staying in tarai jungles and nearby, the rishi-muni and sages were troubled by rohilla soldiers out for hunt in the forest. The soldiers used to disturb the havan fire, using it to cook the kill etc. The two soldiers probably came from Alwar. The village, also spelled as Pheena, used to be very important till mid 70s as it was the only one in the area with about 11 small scale sugar factories (crushers), an inter college i.e. a school till 12th. The village head was often invited by British officials for judicial Bar duties as well.

== Facilities ==
Village has many schools, two banks, two mini banks, sub-power center, water tank, five sugarcane collecting centres, primary health center, two cooperative societies, primary veterinary hospital, pucca funeral site, several mobile towers, four government wells for irrigation, roadways bus Stand and Khareef irrigation canal facilities are available. There are some open pot jaggery/cane processing small industry also a banquet hall here. The village has four large ponds and a lake. There are five big temples in the village and in addition to these there are about 10 other Dev Sthalas. Pheona is connected with roadways buses and bus pass through Pheona every half an hour in day time. The market is held on Sunday and Wednesday. The village has a lot of shops of various things. Two police posts are located at different places near the village of Pheona. There were also two small cinema houses in the 1990s-2000s. One of India's initial 10 continuous operating reference station has been installed by Survey of India at Pheona.

== Demographics ==
People of Pheona participated in large numbers in the freedom struggle. The names of 18 people of Pheona are listed in government document as freedom fighters. The names of these 18 fighters are as follows - Basant Singh, Randhir Singh, Hori Singh, Kshetrapal Singh, Dr. Bharat Singh, Dilip Singh, Raghuveer Singh, Maharaj Singh, Jaydev Singh, Daulat Singh, Sher Singh, Raghunath Singh, Dharam Singh, Ramswaroop Singh, Ramswaroop Chauhan, Shivnath Singh, Balvant singh, Kanhaiya singh. Two freedom fighters Balkaran Singh and Parveen Singh were martyred in the freedom movement 1942, but unfortunately remained anonymous. In memory of the fighters, the villagers have jointly constructed the memorial. This memorial built near Bel Wala Chowk on Chandpur Pheena Amroha Marg..

Ashok Kumar of Pheena sacrificed his life for the country in the Kargil war. He was the first soldier of the district to be martyred in Kargil. His memorial is also built on Bell Wala Chowk. Chandpur to Pheena Marg and primary school are currently named after him.

== Industry ==
During the rainy season, a famous fair of Naumi dedicated to Jahar Dev Goga Ji is held every year on the Kheda situated in the south of the village which derives a significant economic activity in the region. Whilst Sugarcane and jaggery are produced in large quantities in Pheena. There is also adequate production of wheat, black gram, rice, green gram, mango, blackberries.

== Education ==
The people of Pheena have been ahead in education since the beginning. Primary schools have been run since 1920, primary school for girls since 1930 junior school since 1940, high school since 1952 and inter college since 1962. Khem Singh Arya Kanya Inter College is a girls inter college. The Saraswati Shishu Mandir has also been in operation since the 1970s-80s. At this time there are many more schools besides these. Haripal Shastri College is a graduation college, Pheena also has an ITI college.

== Politics ==
Many individuals of Pheona contributed significantly to the politics of the district. Among them Haripal Singh Shastri was MLA and district president of Panchayat and Sahkarita. Many people of Pheona are becoming active in politics and the Survey of India's Continuous Operating Reference station.

== Geography ==
Pheona is located at latitude 29°04'60"N and longitude 78°20'60"E, at an altitude of 680 feet.
