= Negin =

Negin (Persian: نگین: [nə'giːn]) is a Persian word. It means a rare diamond or stone and refers to the gemstone on a piece of jewelry, such as a ring or necklace. The direct translation of Negin is a gem or other jewels with a luxurious look and high value.

It is a popular Persian female given name. Although it is a Persian name, it is also used in the Kurdish, Turkish and Armenian languages as a female name which may be transliterated in a number of ways, such as Nigina (نگینه) in Tajiki Persian, and Nagin or Nagina (نگینہ) in Urdu.

Negin was also an influential literary journal in Tehran. It was published under the editorship of Dr. Mahmood Enayat during the Mohammad Reza Pahlavi era. "

== History ==
In the 13th century, Negin Khatun, the daughter of the Seljuk ruler Ala ad-Din Kayqubad I, was a Persian princess known for her beauty and intelligence. Her name was associated with beauty and was further used in the Persian culture.

== Given Names ==
- Negin Zomorodi, Iranian composer
- Negin Farsad, American comedian
- Negin Mirsalehi, Influencer, Co-founder of “Gisou”
