= Jhalri =

- village
- Location within Uttar Pradesh Location within India
- Coordinates: 29°25′01″N 78°11′11″E
- Country: India
- State: Uttar Pradesh
- District: Bijnor
- Established: 1900; 126 years ago
- Founder: hafiz abdul salam

Government
  - Type: Gram Panchayat Pradhan
  - Body: Gram panchayat

Area
  - Total: 9,000.12 ha (22,239.8 acres)

Population (2011)
  - Total: 610
  - Density: 6.8/km^{2} (18/sq mi)

Languages
  - Officials: Hindi, Urdu
- Time zone: UTC+5:30 (IST)
- Vehicle registration: UP 20

Religions in Jhalri (2011)
| Religion | Percent |
| Hindus | 80% |
| Muslims | 20% |

Jhalri is a village in the Bijnor district in Uttar Pradesh, India.

== Gram Panchayat Election Extended ==
In Uttar Pradesh, the election schedule and the tenure have been extended by one year a first for the state and a similar approach has been adopted in neighboring villages. Minister OP Rajbhar is not currently providing a specific answer regarding exactly when the elections will be held, though he has indicated that the date falls in late December 2026
