= Gohil =

Gohil may refer to:

- Gohil dynasty, 12th-century rulers of Saurashtra in modern Gujarat
- Guhila, alt Gohil a clan of Rajput caste

== People ==
- Dinita Gohil, British actress
- Gigabhai Gohil (died 2020), Indian politician
- Manav Gohil (born 1974), Indian television actor
- Manvendra Singh Gohil (born 1965), Indian prince
- Parthiv Gohil (born 1976), playback singer for Indian films
- Shaktisinh Gohil (born 1960), Indian Member of Parliament
