= Madhusudanpur Nand Urf Jhalra =

Jhalra
- village
- India Uttar Pradesh
- Coordinates: 29.42°N 78.18°E
- Country: India
- State: Uttar Pradesh
- District: Bijnor
- Block: Mohammadpur Deomal
- Established: 1861; 165 years ago
- Founder: Abdur Rahman Mansoori

Government
  - Type: Gram Panchayat Pradhan
  - Body: Gram panchayat
  - Pradhan: Babbu Urf Jehngir Khan
- Elevation: 950 m (3,120 ft)

Population (2011)
  - Total: 3,642
- Demonym: Jhalariya

Languages
  - Official: Hindi, Urdu, खड़ीबोली
- Time zone: UTC+5:30 (IST)
- Postal code: 246701
- Telephone code: 01342
- Vehicle registration: UP 20
- Swatch jhalra sundar jhalra

Madhusudanpur Nand Urf Jhalra is a large village and near Meerut Pauri Highway National Highway 34 (India) Jhalra Gram Panchayat in Bijnor district block Mohammadpur Deomal of Uttar Pradesh in India.

== Population ==
In 2011, the village had 597 families and a population of 3,642 people, of which 1957 were males and 1685 are females.

== History ==
Telhi Mansoori Jat Khan Fakir Chamar Sakke etc. are included here Eid and Diwali are also celebrated with sorrow Jhalra is located at29.4°N 78.18°E .

== Gram Panchayat ==
As per the constitution of India and the Panchyati Raaj Act, Jhalra Gram Panchayat village is administrated by a Gram Pradhan who is elected by the Villagers

Sl.No.	From	To	Name of Gram Pradhan
1	1950	1990	Abdul Rahman Mansoori (OBC)
2	1995	2000	Laddan (GEN)
4	2000	2005	Shafeeq (GEN)
5	2005	2010	Sukhveer (SC)
6	2010	2015	Shakeel (OBC)
7	2015	2020	Mustari (GEN)
8	2020	—	Gulsher (GEN)

== Government Employees ==
Name	Designation	Department
Aadesh	Anganwadi	Department Of Women & Child Development
Atik Ahamad	Leakpal	Department Of Revenue
Huma Beby	Asst Teacher	Department Of Education
Kusum Rani	Headmaster	Department Of Education
Punam Rani	Frontline Worker	Department Of Health & Family Welfare
Rupesh	Headmaster	Department Of Education
Tahira	Asha	Department Of Health
Vijay Laxmi	Anganwadi	Department Of Women & Child Development

== Education ==
It has a government-run primary and junior school and

Bijnor Public School, Delhi Public School, Platinum Public School

== Religious places ==
Jama Masjid

Noor Masjid

Shiv Mandir

Choti Masjid

Islamia Madrasa

== Founded ==
This village was built by Abdur Rahman Mansoori in 1861. In this village, he served more than 5 terms in this village, that too by becoming Sarpanch in 1950. won the elections and was elected the first head of the village After that India became independent in 1958, then elections went on, then his son Hafiz Abdul Salam contested for the post of Pradhan and became the first Pradhan

=== Religion ===
Religions in Jhalra (2011)
Religion	Percent
Hindus	6%
Muslims	94%

== Nearby places ==
Nearest Districts

Jhalra is located around 5 kilometres Bijnor District

Surrounding districts from jhalra are as follows:

Haridwar District, 60.3 Km

Kotdwar District, 35.2 km

== Services ==
Jio 5G

Jio 4G

BSNL WIFI

VODAFONE

IDEA

AIRTEL

JIO WIFI

== Cricket ground ==
The cricket ground is named after Hafiz Abdul Salam, and is located at 29.432046°N 78.183014°E.

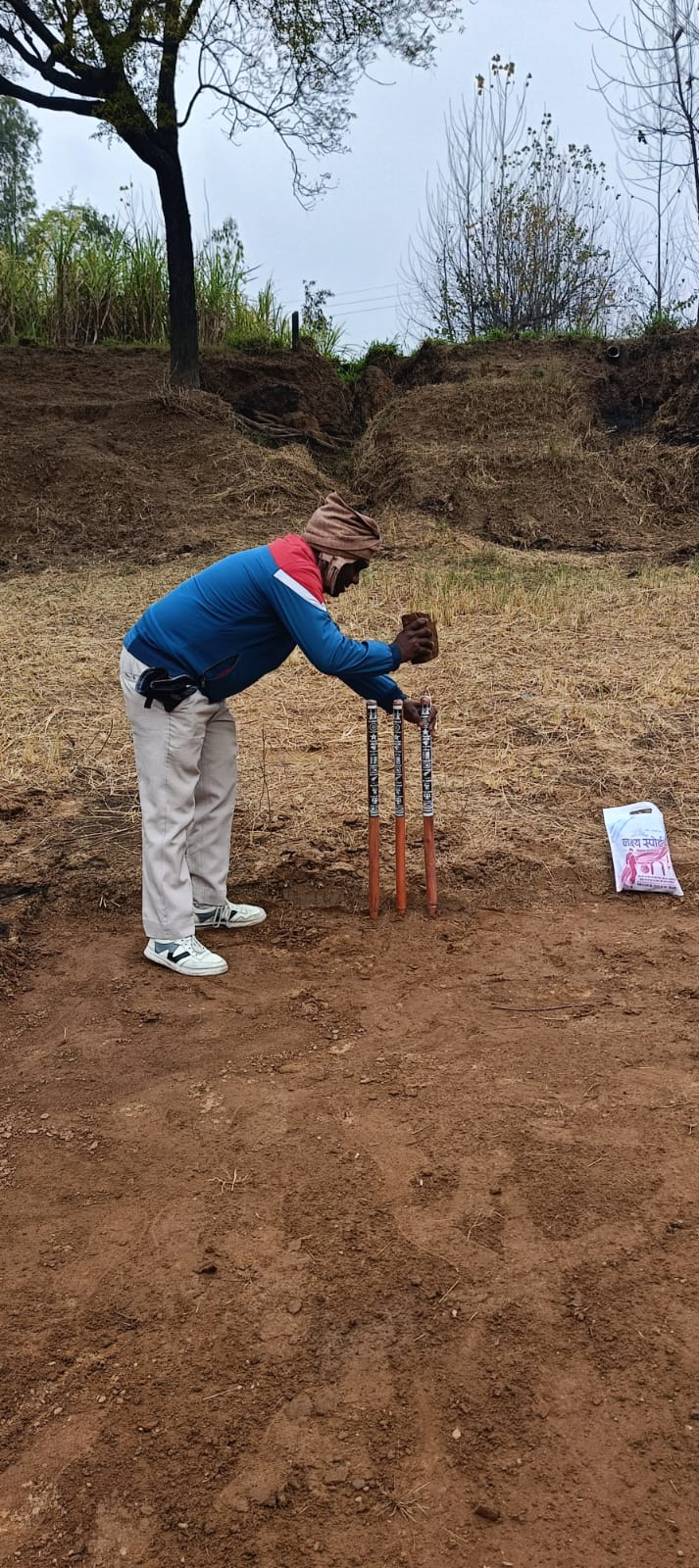

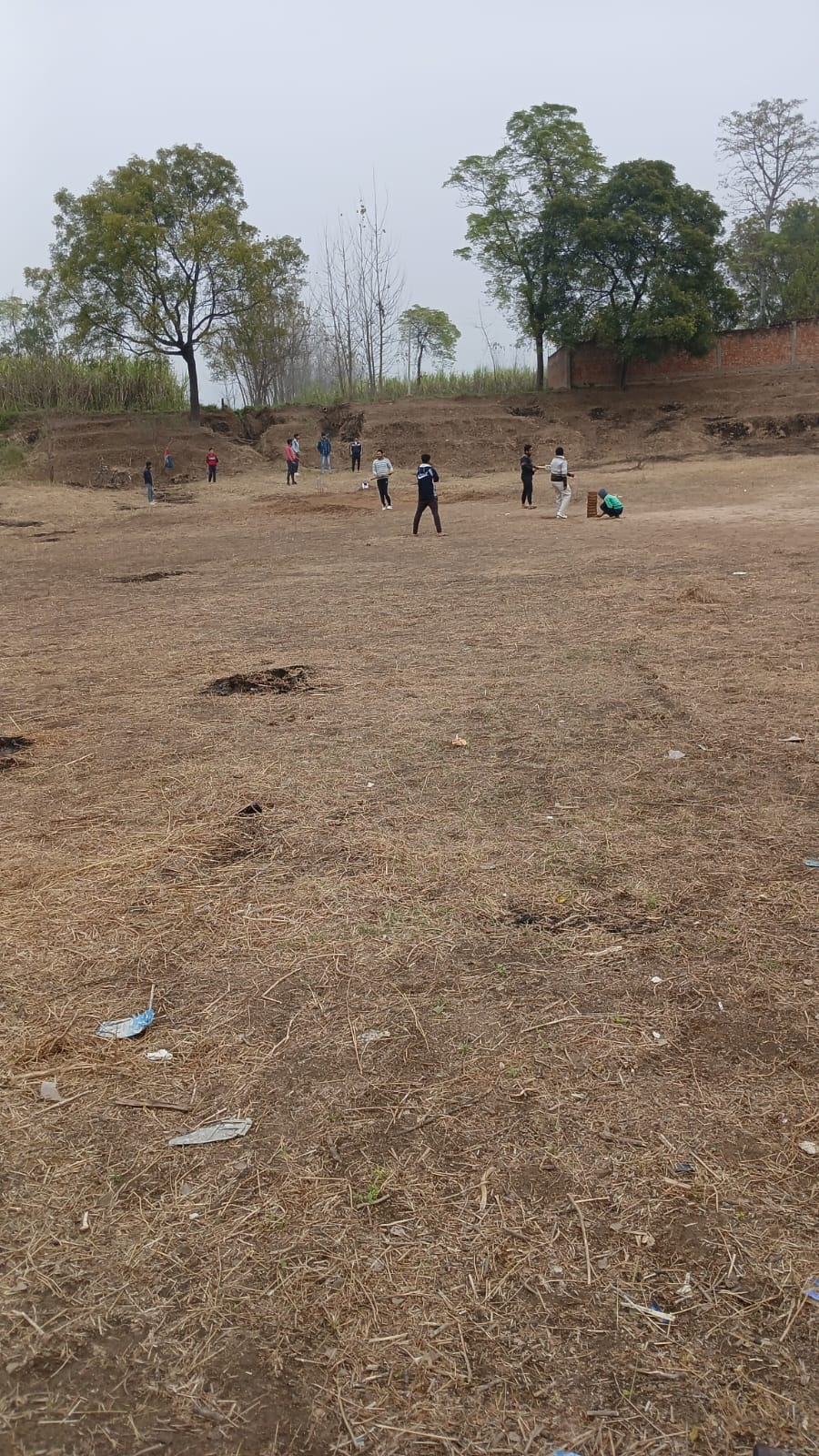
