= Sherkot =

- city
- Location in Uttar Pradesh, India
- Coordinates: 29.35°N 78.58°E
- Country: India
- State: Uttar Pradesh
- District: Bijnor
- Founder: Sher Shah Suri

Government
  - Type: Democracy
  - Body: Sherkot Nagar Palika Parishad
  - Chairperson: Shabnam Naz
- Elevation: 203 m (666 ft)

Population (2011)
  - Total: 62,226
- Time zone: UTC+5:30 (IST)
- PIN: 246747
- Telephone code: 01344
- Vehicle registration: UP 20

Sherkot is a city and municipal board in the Bijnor district of the Indian state of Uttar Pradesh. The city is also known as the Brush Capital of India.

== History ==
Sherkot, was founded by Emperor Sher Shah Suri, an Afghan ruler of the Sur Dynasty, who ruled North India from 1540 AD to 1545 AD after defeating Humayun, a Mughal emperor. Under the reign of Akbar, it was the main town of the pargana region and was attacked in 1805 by Amir Khan, a Pathan invader. Later, during the Indian Rebellion of 1857 it was the scene of battle between loyalists and rebels. The first Battle of Sherkot took place on 28 July 1857 and the second on 5 August.

Up to 1844, it was headquarters of the tehsil, or district and later became a part of the Dhampur tehsil. In 1901, it had a population of 14,999 Shershah Suri Is called the father of Sherkot.

== Geography ==
Sherkot is located at 29.35°N 78.58°E. It has an average elevation of 203 metres (666 feet).

== Economics ==
Sherkot Town in the Dhampur Assembly constituency of western Uttar Pradesh’s Bijnor districtis, is called the ‘Brush Nagari’ of India. The town major and small scale industries includes only painting and drawing brushes and its related works are done in almost every house of the town. The brush works is major earning livelihood of people of town except some individual small agriculture. Sherkot town has around 600 small-scale and cottage industry units that produce an estimated 70 per cent of the painting and drawing brushes in India. They employ between 25,000 and 30,000 people from in and around the Nagar Palika town. This small-scale and cottage industry is mainly unorganized. Most of the Indian brushes are produced in Sherkot, Uttar Pradesh (also known as the ‘brush capital of India’), the supply chain extends to Rajasthan, Kerala, Karnataka, Maharashtra, Tamil Nadu, Uttarakhand, and West Bengal etc.

== River ==
- Kho Beraj

Kho Beraj is only river in Sherkot. This is also known as RamGanga or Ramanga in local language. This river provides water for irrigation.

== Demographics ==
The Indian census of 2011 showed that Sherkot had a population of 62,226 with males constituting 52% and females 48%. Sherkot has an average literacy rate of 58%, lower than the national average of 74.09% with male literacy at 62% and female 53%. 16% of the population is under 6 years of age.

== Villages on the Kalagarh Road (NH-74) ==
Village Ledarpur is about 6 km from Sherkot on the way to Kaalagarh on National Highway 74. Ramganga is about 2 km from this village toward Kaalagarh. It is a small village with no more than fifty houses. This village is combined with Mubarak Pur for the purpose of election of Graam Pradhan. Bhikkawala is a village, about 4 km from Sherkot. This village has its own Graam Pradhan. There is a Junior High School in this village. Aaraji Kandla is a village, about 7 km from Sherkot. This village has its own Graam Pradhan. There are two Junior High School in this village.
