= Kiratpur, Bijnor =

Kiratpur Basi Kiratpur
- Town
- Location in Uttar Pradesh, India
- Coordinates: 29.51°N 78.21°E
- Country: India
- State: Uttar Pradesh
- District: Bijnor

Government
  - Type: Nagar Palika Parishad
  - Chairman: Abdul Mannan (Indian politician)

Population (2011)
  - Total: 61,186

Languages
  - Official: Hindi
- Time zone: UTC+5:30 (IST)
- Postal code: 246731
- Vehicle registration: UP- 20

Kiratpur, also known as Basi Kiratpur, is a town and a Municipal Board in Bijnor district of Uttar Pradesh.

== History ==
Kiratpur as a part of the district Bijnor shares the same history for most of the time period. It was ravaged by Timur in 1399, no documented evidence exists about it until the time of Mughal emperor Akbar, when it formed part of the Mughal Empire and so continued undisturbed, except for occasional raids, as long as the power of the Mughals survived intact.

In the early part of the 18th century, however, the Rohilla Pashtuns established their independent state, which they called Rohilkhand and about 1748 the Rohilla chief Ali Mohammed Khan made his first annexations in Bijnor, the rest of which soon fell under the Rohilla domination. The northern districts including Kiratpur were granted by Ali Muhammad to Najib Khan, who gradually extended his influence west of the Ganges and at Delhi, receiving the title of Najib-ud-daula and becoming paymaster of the royal forces. His success, however, raised up powerful enemies against him, and at their instigation the Marathas invaded Bijnor. This was the beginning of a feud which continued for years. Najib, indeed, held his own, and for the part played by him in the victory of Panipat was made vizier of the empire. After his death in 1770, however, his son Zabita Khan was defeated by the Mahrattas, who overran all Rohilkhand. In 1772 the Nawab of Oudh made a treaty with the Rohillas, covenanting to expel the Marathas in return for a money payment. He carried out his part of the bargain, but the Rohilla chieftains refused to pay.

In 1774 the Nawab concluded with the government of Calcutta a treaty of alliance, and he now called upon the British, in accordance with its terms, to supply a brigade to assist him in enforcing his claims against the Rohillas. This was done; the Rohillas were driven beyond the Ganges, and Bijnor was incorporated in the territories of the Nawab, who in 1774 ceded it to the British East India Company. From this time the history of Bijnor is uneventful until the Mutiny of 1857, when (on 1 June) it was occupied by the nawab of Najibabad, a grandson of Zabita Khan. In spite of fighting between the Hindus and the Muslim Pashtuns the Nawab succeeded in maintaining his position until 21 April 1858, when he was defeated by the British at Nagina; whereupon British authority was restored.

== Location ==
Situated 400 km from the state capital Lucknow and 160 km from National Capital Delhi, this town lies on National Highway 34 between Najibabad and Bijnor.

== Lifestyle and living ==
The population is predominantly traders and small-scale industrialists. The majority of the population follow Hinduism or Islam. Both communities have lived in harmony for a long time.

Cricket and volleyball have been popular in the town and nearby villages.
