= Afzalgarh =

- Town
- Location in Uttar Pradesh, India Afzalgarh (India)
- Coordinates: 29°23′36″N 78°40′28″E
- Country: India
- State: Uttar Pradesh
- District: Bijnor
- Elevation: 212 m (696 ft)

Population (2001)
  - Total: 24,954

Languages
  - Official: Hindi
- Time zone: UTC+5:30 (IST)
- PIN: 246722
- Telephone code: 01343
- Vehicle registration: UP 20
- Website: up.gov.in

Afzalgarh is a city and a municipal board in Bijnor district in the Indian state of Uttar Pradesh. It is located at the border with the state of Uttarakhand.

== Geography ==
Afzalgarh has an average elevation of 212 metres (695 feet). The nearby cities are Kalagarh, Sherkot, Dhampur, Jaspur and Kashipur.

== History ==
The town was founded in the mid-18th century by a local noble named Nawab Afzal Ali Khan, who also built a fort in the area, which was dismantled after the Indian Rebellion of 1857.

The town is on the right bank of the river Ramganga. In 1901, Afzalgarh had a population of 6,474.

== Demographics ==
According to the 2001 census, Afzalgarh had a population of 24,954. Males constituted 53% of the population, and females 47%. As of the 2011 census, Afzalgarh had a population of 235,628. Males constituted 52.09% of the population, and females 47.91%. Afzalgarh had an average literacy rate of 49%, lower than the national average of 59.5%, with 59% of the males and 41% of females literate. 17% of the population was under 6 years of age.
