= Nagina =

Town in Uttar Pradesh, India

- Town
- Location within Uttar Pradesh
- Coordinates: 29.443°N 78.433°E
- Country: India
- State: Uttar Pradesh
- District: Bijnor

Government
  - Type: Nagar Palika
  - Body: Town centre
  - MLA: Manoj Kumar Paras
- Elevation: 282 m (925 ft)

Population (2011)
  - Total: 95,246

Language
  - Official: Hindi
  - Additional official: Urdu
- Time zone: UTC+5:30 (IST)
- PIN: 246762
- Vehicle registration: UP- 20

Nagina is a town and a municipal board in Bijnor district in the Indian state of Uttar Pradesh.

== Name ==
According to Paul Whalley, the name Nagīnā may ultimately come from Sanskrit nāga-ina, meaning "snake lord", via a regularly-derived intermediate form *Nāgena. Nagina is also the word for "Jewel" (See Negin), it was named by Syed's who received this place as jagir by the Mughals.

== History ==
During the British period, it remained the headquarters of Nagina Tahsil, Bijnor district, in the United Province; and from 1817 to 1824, it was the headquarters of newly formed Northern Moradabad district. In 1901, the Nagina Tehsil had 464 villages and two towns: Nagina, with a population of 21,412, and Afzalgarh, with a population of 6,474.

The rise of Rohilla power in the area was marked by an 18th-century fort, which was later used as tahsil or tehsil offices. In 1805, the city was sacked by the Pashtuns under Amir Khan.

As a part of the Indian Rebellion of 1857, Nagina was the site of battle between the Nawab of Najibabad and the British, ending in the defeat of the Nawab on 21 April 1858, following which British established their authority in Bijnor, and later, in 1886, Nagina became a municipality.

== Geography ==
Nagina is located at 29.45°N 78.45°E. It has an average elevation of 282 metres (925 ft).

== Demographics ==
According to Census of India in 2001, Nagina had a population of 71,310. Males constitute 53% of the population and females 47%. Nagina has an average literacy rate of 79%, higher than the national average of 59.5%; Male literacy is 83%, and female literacy is 64%. In Nagina, 14% of the population is under 6 years of age.

=== Religion ===
Religions in Nagina (2011)
Religion	Percent
Muslims	70.53%
Hindus	29.06%
