= Dhampur =

City in Bijnor district, Uttar Pradesh, India

- Municipality
- Location in Uttar Pradesh, India
- Coordinates: 29°18′22″N 78°30′32″E
- Country: India
- State: Uttar Pradesh
- Established: 1975

Government
  - Type: Indian

Area
  - Total: 147 km^{2} (57 sq mi)
- Elevation: 286 m (938 ft)

Population (2011)
  - Total: 56,153

Languages
- Time zone: UTC+5:30 (IST)
- Postal code: 246761

Dhampur is a city and a municipal board in Bijnor district in the state of Uttar Pradesh, India. It is located at 29.51°N 78.50°E, and lies in Northern India.

== History ==
In 1805, Dhampur was sacked by Pindaris. The Indian sugar company Dhampur Sugar Mills first started operations with the established of a sugar mill having a crushing capacity of 300 tonnes of cane per day in 1933.

== Demographics ==
As of 2001 India census, Dhampur had a population of 46,855. Males constitute 53% of the population and females 47%. Dhampur has an average literacy rate of 65%: male literacy is 68% and female literacy is 60%. In Dhampur, 15% of the population is under 6 years of age.

As of the 2011 Census of India Dhampur is a Census Town city in district of Bijnor, Uttar Pradesh. The town has a population of 6,752, of which 3,567 are males while 3,185 are females. Population of children with age of 0-6 is 1001 which is 14.83% of total population. The female sex ratio is of 893 against state average of 912. Moreover, child sex ratio is around 918 compared to the Uttar Pradesh state average of 902. The literacy rate is 71.55%, higher than the state average of 67.68%. male literacy is around 76.75% while the female literacy rate is 65.71%. The town has total administration over 1,166 houses.

== Connectivity ==
Dhampur is well connected through railways and roads. Dhampur railway station is situated on the Moradabad–Ambala line of the Indian Railways.
