= Mohammadpur Deomal =

Village in Uttar Pradesh, India

Mohammadpur deomal
- village
- Interactive map of Mohammadpur deomal
- Country: India
- State: Uttar Pradesh
- District: Bijnor
- Established: 1900; 126 years ago
- Founder: hafiz abdul salam

Government
  - Type: Gram Panchayat Pradhan
  - Body: Gram panchayat

Area
  - Total: 8,500.13 ha (21,004.3 acres)

Population (2011)
  - Total: 4,504
  - Density: 52.99/km^{2} (137.2/sq mi)

Languages
  - Officials: Hindi, Urdu
- Time zone: UTC+5:30 (IST)
- Vehicle registration: UP 20
- deomal humara seva savera

Mohammadpur Deomal is a block and village in under Block 108 village Bijnor district and Tehsil Bijnor, with PIN code 246721.

== Members Employees ==
Gram Panchayat - MOHDPURDEVMAL Employees
#	Name	Designation	Department
1	Deepak Raj	Headmaster	Department Of Education
2	Degendra Singh	Gva	Department Of Rural Development
3	Devendra Kumar	Headmaster	Department Of Education
4	Imrana	Asst Teacher	Department Of Education
5	Manju Vishoni	Anganwadi	Department Of Women & Child Development
6	Meenakshi Devi	Asst Teacher	Department Of Education
7	Neeraj Rani	Headmaster	Department Of Education
8	Rajni Vishoni	Anganwadi	Department Of Women & Child Development
9	Rajpal Singh	Headmaster	Department Of Education
10	Sanjeev Kumar	Gpa	Department Of Panchayati Raj
11	Smt. Sonika	Headmaster	Department Of Education
12	Sunita Devi	Anm	Department Of Health
13	Vipendra Kumar	Headmaster	Department Of Education

== Members ==
Gram Panchayat - MOHDPURDEVMAL Members
#	Name	Designation
1	Ajay Veer	Gram Panchayat Member
2	Anita	Gram Panchayat Member
3	Anita	Gram Panchayat Member
4	Dhara	Gram Panchayat Member
5	Famita	Gram Panchayat Member
6	Fhool	Gram Panchayat Member
7	Himanshu	Gram Panchayat Member
8	Kuvarpal Vishnoyai	Gram Panchayat Member
9	Maya	Gram Panchayat Member
10	Rampal	Gram Panchayat Member
11	Satayparkash	Gram Panchayat Member
12	Vidya Devi	Gram Panchayat Member

== Wards ==
Gram Panchayat - MOHDPURDEVMAL Wards
No.	Ward Name	Ward No	LGD Code
1	Ward No 1	1	2768246
2	Ward No 2	2	2768247
3	Ward No 3	3	2768248
4	Ward No 4	4	2768249
5	Ward No 5	5	2768250
6	Ward No 6	6	2768251
7	Ward No 7	7	2768252
8	Ward No 8	8	2768253
9	Ward No 9	9	2768254
10	Ward No 10	10	2768255
11	Ward No 11	11	2768256
12	Ward No 12	12	2768257
13	Ward No 13	13	2768258
14	Ward No 14	14	2768259
15	Ward No 15	15	2768260
