= Bijnor district =

Coordinates: 29°25′N 78°31′E

- District of Uttar Pradesh
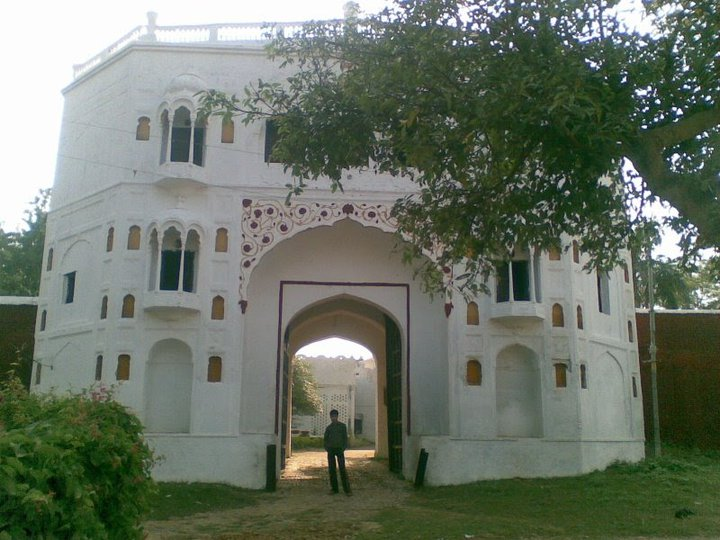
- Sahanpur Fort

- Location of Bijnor district in Uttar Pradesh
- Country: India
- State: Uttar Pradesh
- Division: Moradabad
- Headquarters: Bijnor

Area
  - Total: 4,049 km^{2} (1,563 sq mi)

Population (2011)
  - Total: 3,682,713
  - Density: 909.5/km^{2} (2,356/sq mi)

Demographics
  - Literacy: 70.43%
  - Sex ratio: 917
- Time zone: UTC+05:30 (IST)
- Website: http://bijnor.nic.in/

Bijnor district (Hindi pronunciation: [bɪd͡ʒ.n̪ɔːɾ]) is one of the 75 districts in the state of Uttar Pradesh in India. Bijnor city is the district headquarters. The government of Nagar Palika Parishad Bijnor Uttar Pradesh seeks its inclusion in National Capital Region (NCR) due to its close proximity to NCT of Delhi.

Bijnor is notable for its sugarcane production and sugar mills, with two of the top five sugar mills of India situated in the district.

== History ==
Bijnor district was created in 1817 out of part of Moradabad district, and it was originally called Nagina district after its headquarters at Nagina. The headquarters was relocated to Bijnor in 1824, although the district was still called "Nagina district" until 1837, when it officially became known as Bijnor district.

=== Medieval history ===
In 1399, the district was ravaged by Timur. Later, during the time of Akbar, Bijnor was part of his Mughal Empire. In the early 18th century, the Rohilla Pashtuns established their independence in the area called by the Rohilkhand. Around 1748, the Rohilla chief Ali Mohammed Khan made his first annexations in Bijnor, the rest of which soon fell under the Rohilla domination. The northern districts were granted by Ali Mohammed Khan to Khurshid Ahmed Baig, who gradually extended his influence west of the Ganges and at Delhi, receiving the title of Najib-ud-daula with the position of the paymaster of the Mughal forces. Marathas invaded Bijnor who was also instigated by enemies of Rohillas, leading to several battles. Rohilla chief, Najib, who sided with Ahmad Shah Abdali in Panipat, was made vizier of the empire.

=== Colonial era ===
In 1772 the Nawab of Oudh made a treaty with the Rohillas, to expel the Marathas in return for a money payment. Nawab of Oudh carried out his part of the bargain, but the Rohilla chieftains refused to pay. In 1774 the Nawab concluded with the East India Company government of Calcutta a treaty of alliance, and he then called upon the British, in accordance with its terms, to supply a brigade to assist him in enforcing his claims against the Rohillas. This was done; in the Rohilla War, the Rohillas were driven beyond the Ganges to the east, and Bijnor was incorporated in the territories of the nawab, who in the same year (1774) ceded it to the British East India Company. During the rebellion of 1857, Bijnor was occupied by the Nawab of Najibabad, a grandson of Zabita Khan, on 1 June. The Barha Sayyids of Bijnor, who were hereditary enemies of the Rohillas, threw their hat in their lot with the Rohillas Pashtuns and fought on their side almost to the last man during the rebellion. In spite of fighting between the Hindus and the Muslim Pashtuns, the Nawab succeeded in maintaining his position until 21 April 1858, when he was defeated by the British at Nagina.

== Geography ==
Bijnor, or more correctly Bijnaur, occupies the north-west corner of the Moradabad Division (historically, Rohilkhand or Bareilly region). The western boundary is formed throughout by the deep stream of the river Ganges, beyond which lie the four districts of Haridwar, Saharanpur, Muzaffarnagar, and Meerut. To the north and north-east in the hill country of Garhwal, the dividing line being the submontane road, which runs from Haridwar along the foot of the Himalayas to Ramnagar, Nainital, Haldwani, and Tanakpur. This road, popularly known as the Kandi Sadak, belongs throughout its length to Garhwal, the transfer having taken place a few years since. On the east the Phika river for the greater part of its course constitutes the boundary, separating this district from Nainital and Moradabad, as far as its junction with the Ramganga; and to the south lie the Thakurdwara Tehsil of Moradabad. Amroha and Hasanpur tahsils of Amroha District. The boundary being conventional and undetermined by natural features. The extreme parallels of north latitude are 29° 2' and 29° 58' and of east longitude 78° 0' and 78° 57' from Lalitpur, the most northerly point, to koti Rao in the furthest eastern corner the distance in 56 miles (90 km); and from Koti Rao to Kamharia in the south-westerly angle 57 miles (92 km); and from Kamharia to Lalitpur 62 miles (100 km). The total area of the district is liable to change slightly from time to time by reason of the erratic action of the Ganges and Ramganga: In 1906 it amounted to 1,145,272 acres (1,789.488 mi^{2}; 4,634.75 km^{2}), the average for the last five years being 1,147,967 acres (1,793.698 mi^{2}; 4,645.66 km^{2}).

There remains the low fringe of Khadir along the Ganges to the west. This generally resembles the lowlands that skirt the rivers of the interior, the low flats which adjoin the stream itself being purely alluvial in character, while above them rises a terrace of higher ground extending inland as far as the chain of stagnant morasses lying immediately under the bangar cliff.

== Demographics ==
Historical population
Year	Pop.	±% p.a.
1901	776,308	—
1911	802,166	+0.33%
1921	736,765	−0.85%
1931	831,403	+1.22%
1941	905,793	+0.86%
1951	979,406	+0.78%
1961	1,184,306	+1.92%
1971	1,480,734	+2.26%
1981	1,927,023	+2.67%
1991	2,454,521	+2.45%
2001	3,131,619	+2.47%
2011	3,682,713	+1.63%

According to the 2011 census Bijnor district has a population of 3,682,713, roughly equal to the nation of Liberia or the US state of Oklahoma. This gives it a ranking of 74th in India (out of a total of 640). The district has a population density of 808 inhabitants per square kilometre (2,090/sq mi). Its population growth rate over the decade 2001-2011 was 17.64%. Bijnor has a sex ratio of 913 females for every 1000 males, and a literacy rate of 70.43%. 25.13% of the population lived in urban areas. Scheduled Castes and Scheduled Tribes make up 21.38% and 0.08% of the population respectively.

=== Religion ===
Religions in Bijnor district (2011)
Religion	Percent
Hinduism	55.18%
Islam	43.04%
Sikhism	1.37%
Others†	0.41%
Distribution of religions †Includes Jains (0.17%), Christians (0.17%), Buddhists (<0.05%).

Majority of the people of the district follow Hinduism followed closely by adherents of Islam. Sikhism is followed by a little more than one per cent of the population. Jainism, Christianity and Buddhism have small number of adherents.

Tehsil	Hindus	Muslims	Others
Najibabad	48.44%	50.37%	1.19%
Bijnor	63.46%	35.66%	0.88%
Nagina	50.73%	46.10%	3.17%
Dhampur	54.99%	42.93%	2.08%
Chandpur	58.15%	40.14%	1.71%

=== Languages ===
Languages of Bijnor district (2011)
1. Hindi (76.3%)
2. Urdu (22.5%)
3. Punjabi (0.96%)
4. Others (0.18%)

Hindi and Urdu are the official languages. At the time of the 2011 Census of India, 76.33% of the population of the district spoke Hindi, 22.53% Urdu and 0.96% Punjabi as their first language.

== Government and administration ==
=== Politics ===
The Member of Parliament from Bijnor Lok Sabha constituency is Chandan Chauhan, since 4 June 2024. He represents Rashtriya Lok Dal.

=== Assembly constituencies ===
Najibabad, Chandpur, Noorpur, Dhampur, Nagina (reserved), Bijnor, Barhapur, Nehtaur (Reserved)

=== Settlements ===
==== Urban ====
- Afzalgarh
- Basi Kiratpur
- Bijnor
- Chandok
- Chandpur
- Dhampur
- Haldaur
- Jhalu
- Mandawar
- Nagina
- Najibabad
- Nehtaur
- Noorpur
- Sahaspur
- Seohara
- Sherkot

==== Rural ====
- Askaripur
- Bahupura
- Harewali
- Jhalri
- Linderpur
- Madhusudanpur Nand Urf Jhalra
- Naseeri
- Pakhanpur
- Pheona
- Tajpur
- Ratangarh
- Sisauna
- Umri

== Economy ==
Bijnor district has a vast sugar industry with total nine sugar mills of which Dhampur mill and Bundki mill are among India's top sugar mills. Approximately 2.09 lakh hectares of land is dedicated to sugarcane farming.

== Cuisine ==
Bijnor Urad Chawal is a notable rice-based dish of the region. It is served in special occasions like marriage.

== Notable people ==
- Najib ad-Dawlah, Mughal serviceman and founder of Najibabad
- Raashid Alvi, politician
- Vishal Bhardwaj, film director and producer
- Rahul Chaudhari, professional kabaddi player, gold medal winner in the 2016 South Asian Games as member of India national kabaddi team
- Nazir Ahmad Dehlvi, Urdu novel writer, social and religious reformer
- Sahu Jain family, Prominent Industrialist who owns Times Group.
- Naim Ul Hasan, politician
- Bakht Khan, Indian rebel chief associated with Indian Rebellion of 1857
- Dushyant Kumar, Hindi-language poet
- Om Kumar, politician
- Manoj Kumar Paras, politician
- Jagdish Prasad Mathur, politician
- Prakash Mehra, film director and producer
- Shadab Nazar, first-class cricketer
- Swami Omvesh, politician
- Hamid Afaq Qureshi, historian
- Azizur Rahman, politician
- Lokendra Singh, politician
- Meghna Singh, cricketer and member of the India women's national cricket team
- Munshiram Singh, politician
- Virendra Singh, Indian physicist
- Suchi, politician
- Ruchi Veera, politician
- Syed Sajjad Haider Yaldram, Urdu short story writer, travel writer, translator, linguist, essayist, and humorist
