= Debabrata =

Debabrata is an Indian name. It may refer to:

- Debabrata Bandyopadhyay, Indian politician
- Debabrata Basu, Indian statistician
- Debabrata Biswas, Indian singer
- Debabrata Biswas (politician)
- Debabrata Das, Indian cricketer
- Debabrata Pradhan, Indian cricketer
- Debabrata Roy, Indian football player
- Debabrata Mukherjee (cricketer), Indian cricketer
- Debabrata Saikia, Indian politician
- Debabrata Sharma, Indian activist
- Debabrata Barua Paul, Bangladeshi cricketer
