= List of National Democratic Alliance candidates in the 2009 Indian general election =

NDA candidates in 2009 Indian lower house election

National Democratic Alliance is an Indian political party coalition led by Bharatiya Janata Party. For the 2009 Indian general election, the NDA's candidates for the Lok Sabha constituencies are as follows.

== Seat Sharing Summary ==
Constituents of National Democratic Alliance (Pre-poll Alliance)
#	Party	Alliance in states	Seats contested	Seats won	References
1	Bharatiya Janata Party	All States and UTs	433	116	
2	Janata Dal (United)	Bihar, Jharkhand, Tamil Nadu, Uttar Pradesh, Kerala	32	20	
3	Shiv Sena	Maharashtra, Tamil Nadu	24	11	
4	Shiromani Akali Dal	Punjab	10	4	
5	Rashtriya Lok Dal	Uttar Pradesh	7	5	
6	Asom Gana Parishad	Assam	6	1	
7	Indian National Lok Dal	Haryana	5	0	
8	Naga People's Front	Nagaland	1	1	
9	Rashtrawadi Sena	Assam	1	0	
10	Ajitrao Ghorpade (Independent candidate) supported by BJP	Maharashtra	1	0	
11	H. Lallungmuana (Independent candidate) supported by BJP	Mizoram	1	0	
Total			521	158	

== Andhra Pradesh ==
BJP (41)

Constituency No.	Constituency	Reserved for (SC/ST/None)	Candidate	Party	Poll On	Result
1	Adilabad	ST	Ade Tukaram	Bharatiya Janata Party		Lost
2	Peddapalli	SC	Mathangi Narsiah	Bharatiya Janata Party		Lost
3	Karimnagar	None	Chendupatla Janga Reddy	Bharatiya Janata Party		Lost
4	Nizamabad	None	Bapu Reddy	Bharatiya Janata Party		Lost
5	Zahirabad	None	Chengal Baganna	Bharatiya Janata Party		Lost
6	Medak	None	Niroop Reddy	Bharatiya Janata Party		Lost
7	Malkajgiri	None	Nallu Indrasena Reddy	Bharatiya Janata Party		Lost
8	Secunderabad	None	Bandaru Dattatreya	Bharatiya Janata Party		Lost
9	Hyderabad	None	Satish Agarwal	Bharatiya Janata Party		Lost
10	Chevella	None	Baddam Bal Reddy	Bharatiya Janata Party		Lost
11	Mahbubnagar	None	Kuchakulla Yadagiri Reddy	Bharatiya Janata Party		Lost
12	Nagarkurnool	SC	T Ratnakara	Bharatiya Janata Party		Lost
13	Nalgonda	None	Vedire Sriram Reddy	Bharatiya Janata Party		Lost
14	Bhongir	None	Chintha Samba Murthy	Bharatiya Janata Party		Lost
15	Warangal	SC	V Jayapal	Bharatiya Janata Party		Lost
16	Mahabubabad	ST	B. Dilip	Bharatiya Janata Party		Lost
17	Khammam	None	Kapilavai Ravinder	Bharatiya Janata Party		Lost
18	Araku	ST	Kurusa Bojjaiah	Bharatiya Janata Party		Lost
19	Srikakulam	None	Duppala Ravindara Babu	Bharatiya Janata Party		Lost
20	Vizianagaram	None	Pakalapati Sanyasi Raju	Bharatiya Janata Party		Lost
21	Visakhapatnam	None	D.V.Subbarao	Bharatiya Janata Party		Lost
22	Anakapalli	None	Kirla Appa Rao	Bharatiya Janata Party		Lost
23	Kakinada	None	Bikkina Visweswara Rao	Bharatiya Janata Party		Lost
24	Amalapuram	SC	Kommabattula Uma Maheswara Rao	Bharatiya Janata Party		Lost
25	Rajahmundry	None	Somu Veerraju	Bharatiya Janata Party		Lost
26	Naraspur	None	Bhupathi Raju Srinivasa Varma	Bharatiya Janata Party		Lost
27	Eluru	None	Koduri Venkata Subba Raju	Bharatiya Janata Party		Lost
28	Machilipatnam	None	Bhogadi Rama Devi	Bharatiya Janata Party		Lost
29	Vijayawada	None	Laka Vengala Rao Yadav	Bharatiya Janata Party		Lost
30	Guntur	None	Yadlapati Swaruparani	Bharatiya Janata Party		Lost
31	Narasaraopet	None	Vallepu Krupa Rao	Bharatiya Janata Party		Lost
32	Bapatla	SC	Battula Rosayya	Bharatiya Janata Party		Lost
33	Ongole	None	Mandava Vasudeva	Bharatiya Janata Party		Lost
34	Nandyal	None	None			
35	Kurnool	None	Ravi Subramanyam	Bharatiya Janata Party		Lost
36	Anantapur	None	Ambati Rama Krishna Reddy	Bharatiya Janata Party		Lost
37	Hindupur	None	Naresh	Bharatiya Janata Party		Lost
38	Kadapa	None	Vangala Shashi Bhushan Reddy	Bharatiya Janata Party		Lost
39	Nellore	None	Bathina Narasimha Rao	Bharatiya Janata Party		Lost
40	Tirupati	SC	Nandipaku Venkataswamy	Bharatiya Janata Party		Lost
41	Rajampet	None	Allapureddy Harinatha Reddy	Bharatiya Janata Party		Lost
42	Chittoor	SC	B Sivakumar	Bharatiya Janata Party		Lost

== Arunachal Pradesh ==
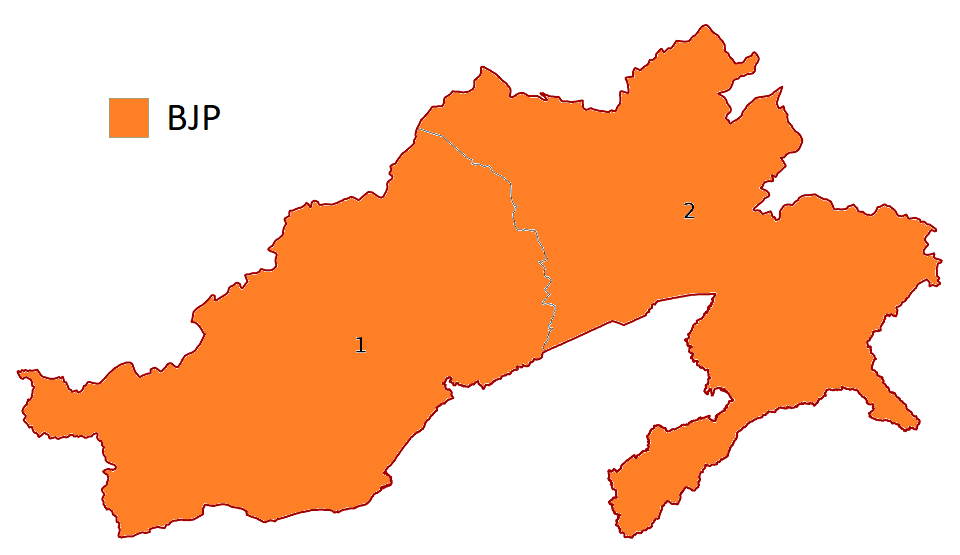
Arunachal Pradesh NDA

BJP (2)

Constituency No.	Constituency	Reserved for (SC/ST/None)	Candidate	Party	Poll On	Result
1	Arunachal West	None	Kiren Rijiju	Bharatiya Janata Party		Lost
2	Arunachal East	None	Tapir Gao	Bharatiya Janata Party		Lost

== Assam ==
BJP (7) AGP (6) RS (1)

Constituency No.	Constituency	Reserved for (SC/ST/None)	Candidate	Party	Poll On	Result
1	Karimganj	SC	Sudhangshu Das	Bharatiya Janata Party		Lost
2	Silchar	None	Kabindra Purkayastha	Bharatiya Janata Party		Won
3	Autonomous District	ST	Kulendra Daulagupu	Bharatiya Janata Party		Lost
4	Dhubri	None	Arun Das	Rashtrawadi Sena		Lost
5	Kokrajhar	ST	Sabda Ram Rabha	Asom Gana Parishad		Lost
6	Barpeta	None	Bhupen Ray	Asom Gana Parishad		Lost
7	Gauhati	None	Bijoya Chakraborty	Bharatiya Janata Party		Won
8	Mangaldoi	None	Ramen Deka	Bharatiya Janata Party		Won
9	Tezpur	None	Joseph Toppo	Asom Gana Parishad		Won
10	Nowgong	None	Rajen Gohain	Bharatiya Janata Party		Won
11	Kaliabor	None	Gunin Hazarika	Asom Gana Parishad		Lost
12	Jorhat	None	Kamakhya Prasad Tasa	Bharatiya Janata Party		Lost
13	Dibrugarh	None	Sarbananda Sonowal	Asom Gana Parishad		Lost
14	Lakhimpur	None	Arun Kumar Sarmah	Asom Gana Parishad		Lost

== Bihar ==
JD(U) (25) BJP (15)

Constituency No.	Constituency	Reserved for (SC/ST/None)	Candidate	Party	Poll On	Result
1	Valmiki Nagar	None	Baidyanath Prasad Mahto	Janata Dal (United)		Won
2	Paschim Champaran	None	Dr. Sanjay Jayaswal	Bharatiya Janata Party		Won
3	Purvi Champaran	None	Radha Mohan Singh	Bharatiya Janata Party		Won
4	Sheohar	None	Rama Devi	Bharatiya Janata Party		Won
5	Sitamarhi	None	Arjun Roy	Janata Dal (United)		Won
6	Madhubani	None	Hukmdev Narayan Yadav	Bharatiya Janata Party		Won
7	Jhanjharpur	None	Mangani Lal Mandal	Janata Dal (United)		Won
8	Supaul	None	Vishwa Mohan Kumar	Janata Dal (United)		Won
9	Araria	None	Pradeep Kumar Singh	Bharatiya Janata Party		Won
10	Kishanganj	None	Syed Mahmood Ashraf	Janata Dal (United)		Lost
11	Katihar	None	Nikhil Kumar Choudhary	Bharatiya Janata Party		Won
12	Purnia	None	Uday Singh	Bharatiya Janata Party		Won
13	Madhepura	None	Sharad Yadav	Janata Dal (United)		Won
14	Darbhanga	None	Kirti Azad	Bharatiya Janata Party		Won
15	Muzaffarpur	None	Jai Narain Prasad Nishad	Janata Dal (United)		Won
16	Vaishali	None	Vijay Kumar Shukla	Janata Dal (United)		Lost
17	Gopalganj	SC	Purnmasi Ram	Janata Dal (United)		Won
18	Siwan	None	Brishin Patel	Janata Dal (United)		Lost
19	Maharajganj	None	Prabhunath Singh	Janata Dal (United)		Lost
20	Saran	None	Rajiv Pratap Rudy	Bharatiya Janata Party		Lost
21	Hajipur	SC	Ram Sundar Das	Janata Dal (United)		Won
22	Ujiarpur	None	Ashwamedh Devi	Janata Dal (United)		Won
23	Samastipur	SC	Maheshwar Hazari	Janata Dal (United)		Won
24	Begusarai	None	Monazir Hassan	Janata Dal (United)		Won
25	Khagaria	None	Dinesh Chandra Yadav	Janata Dal (United)		Won
26	Bhagalpur	None	Syed Shahnawaz Hussain	Bharatiya Janata Party		Won
27	Banka	None	Damodar Rawat	Janata Dal (United)		Lost
28	Munger	None	Rajiv Ranjan Singh	Janata Dal (United)		Won
29	Nalanda	None	Kaushalendra Kumar	Janata Dal (United)		Won
30	Patna Sahib	None	Shatrughan Sinha	Bharatiya Janata Party		Won
31	Pataliputra	None	Ranjan Prasad Yadav	Janata Dal (United)		Won
32	Arrah	None	Meena Singh	Janata Dal (United)		Won
33	Buxar	None	Lal Muni Choubey	Bharatiya Janata Party		Lost
34	Sasaram	SC	Muni Lal	Bharatiya Janata Party		Lost
35	Karakat	None	Mahabali Singh	Janata Dal (United)		Won
36	Jahanabad	None	Jagdish Sharma	Janata Dal (United)		Won
37	Aurangabad	None	Sushil Kumar Singh	Janata Dal (United)		Won
38	Gaya	SC	Hari Manjhi	Bharatiya Janata Party		Won
39	Nawada	None	Bhola Singh	Bharatiya Janata Party		Won
40	Jamui	SC	Bhudeo Choudhary	Janata Dal (United)		Won

== Chhattisgarh ==
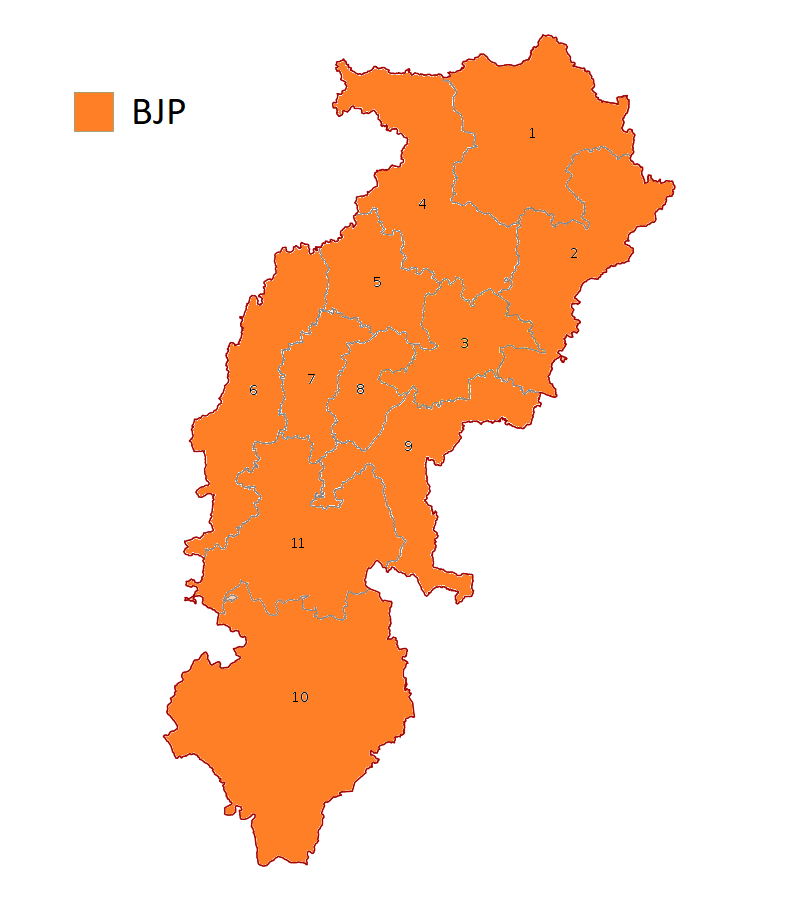
Chhattisgarh NDA

BJP (11)

Constituency No.	Constituency	Reserved for (SC/ST/None)	Candidate	Party	Poll On	Result
1	Surguja	ST	Murarilal Singh	Bharatiya Janata Party		Won
2	Raigarh	ST	Vishnudeo Sai	Bharatiya Janata Party		Won
3	Janjgir-Champa	SC	Kamla Devi Patle	Bharatiya Janata Party		Won
4	Korba	None	Karuna Shukla	Bharatiya Janata Party		Lost
5	Bilaspur	None	Dilip Singh Judeo	Bharatiya Janata Party		Won
6	Rajnandgaon	None	Madhusudan Yadav	Bharatiya Janata Party		Won
7	Durg	None	Saroj Pandey	Bharatiya Janata Party		Won
8	Raipur	None	Ramesh Bais	Bharatiya Janata Party		Won
9	Mahasamund	None	Chandu Lal Sahu	Bharatiya Janata Party		Won
10	Bastar	ST	Baliram Kashyap	Bharatiya Janata Party		Won
11	Kanker	ST	Sohan Potai	Bharatiya Janata Party		Won

== Goa ==
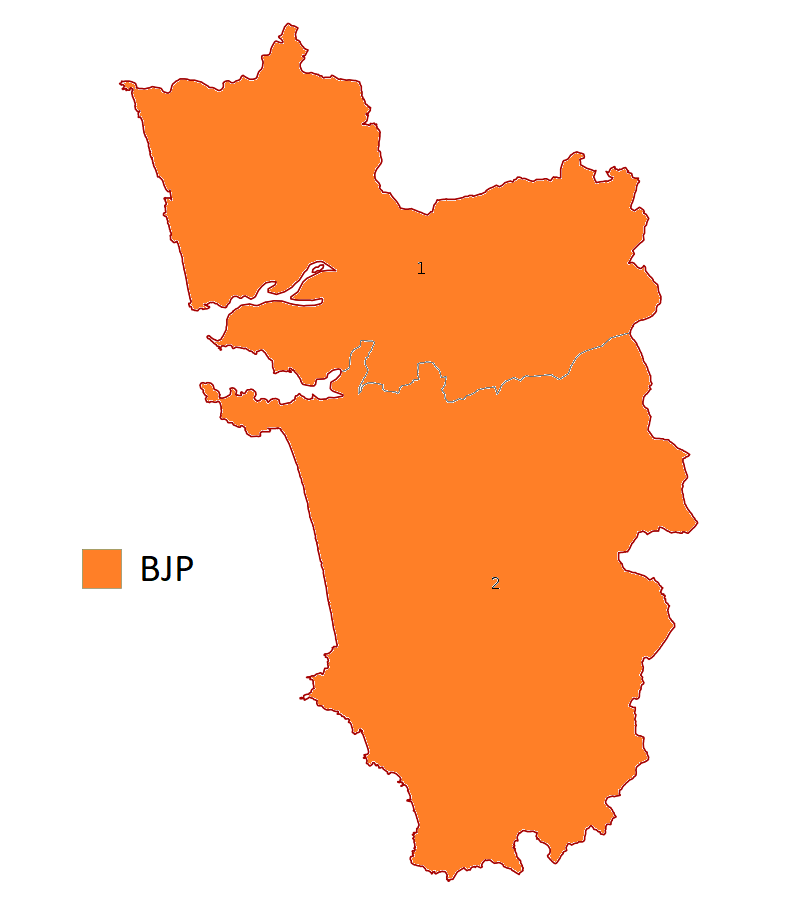
Goa NDA

BJP (2)

Constituency No.	Constituency	Reserved for (SC/ST/None)	Candidate	Party	Poll On	Result
1	North Goa	None	Shripad Yesso Naik	Bharatiya Janata Party		Won
2	South Goa	None	Narendra Keshav Sawaikar	Bharatiya Janata Party		Lost

== Gujarat ==
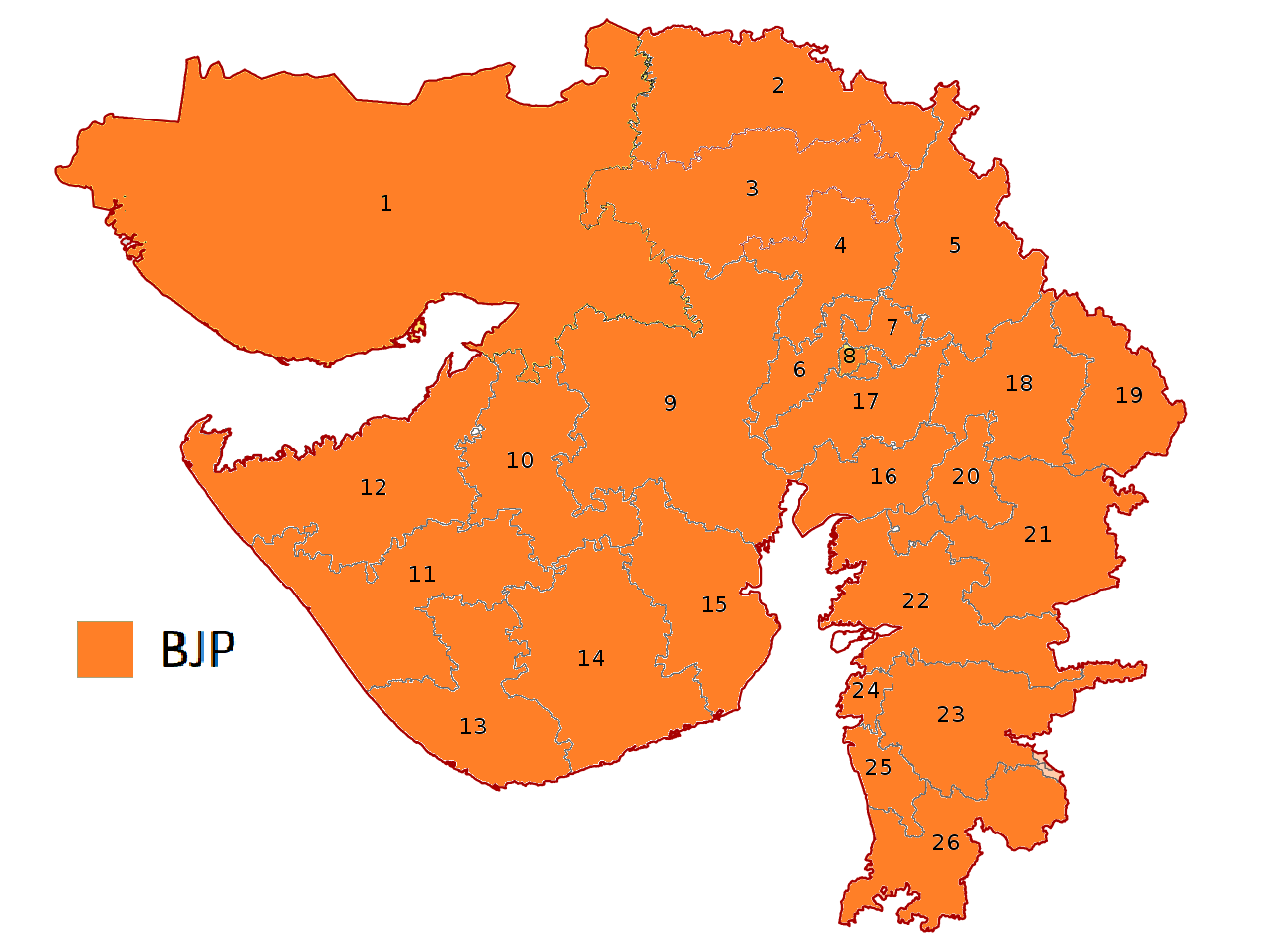
Gujarat NDA

BJP (26)

Constituency No.	Constituency	Reserved for (SC/ST/None)	Candidate	Party	Poll On	Result
1	Kachchh	SC	Poonamben Veljibhai Jat	Bharatiya Janata Party		Won
2	Banaskantha	None	Haribhai Chaudhary	Bharatiya Janata Party		Lost
3	Patan	None	Bhavsinh Rathod	Bharatiya Janata Party		Lost
4	Mahesana	None	Jayshreeben Patel	Bharatiya Janata Party		Won
5	Sabarkantha	None	Mahendrasinh Chauhan	Bharatiya Janata Party		Won
6	Gandhinagar	None	Lal Krishna Advani	Bharatiya Janata Party		Won
7	Ahmedabad East	None	Harin Pathak	Bharatiya Janata Party		Won
8	Ahmedabad West	SC	Dr. Kirit Premjibhai Solanki	Bharatiya Janata Party		Won
9	Surendranagar	None	Laljibhai Chaturbhai Mer	Bharatiya Janata Party		Lost
10	Rajkot	None	Kirankumar Patel	Bharatiya Janata Party		Lost
11	Porbandar	None	Mansukhbhai Shamjibhai Kachariya	Bharatiya Janata Party		Lost
12	Jamnagar	None	Rameshbhai Mungra	Bharatiya Janata Party		Lost
13	Junagadh	None	Dinubhai Boghabhai Solanki	Bharatiya Janata Party		Won
14	Amreli	None	Naranbhai Kachhadia	Bharatiya Janata Party		Won
15	Bhavnagar	None	Rajendrasinh Rana	Bharatiya Janata Party		Won
16	Anand	None	Dipak Patel	Bharatiya Janata Party		Lost
17	Kheda	None	Devusinh Chouhan	Bharatiya Janata Party		Lost
18	Panchmahal	None	Prabhatsingh Chouhan	Bharatiya Janata Party		Won
19	Dahod	ST	Somjibhai Damor	Bharatiya Janata Party		Lost
20	Vadodara	None	Balkrishna Shukla	Bharatiya Janata Party		Won
21	Chhota Udaipur	ST	Ramsinh Rathwa	Bharatiya Janata Party		Won
22	Bharuch	None	Mansukhbhai Vasava	Bharatiya Janata Party		Won
23	Bardoli	ST	Ritesh Vasava	Bharatiya Janata Party		Lost
24	Surat	None	Darshana Jardosh	Bharatiya Janata Party		Won
25	Navsari	None	Chandrakant Raghunath Patil	Bharatiya Janata Party		Won
26	Valsad	ST	D.C.Patel	Bharatiya Janata Party		Lost

== Haryana ==
BJP (5) INLD (5)

Constituency No.	Constituency	Reserved for (SC/ST/None)	Candidate	Party	Poll On	Result
1	Ambala	SC	Rattan Lal Kataria	Bharatiya Janata Party		Lost
2	Kurukshetra	None	Ashok Kumar Arora	Indian National Lok Dal		Lost
3	Sirsa	SC	Dr Sita Ram	Indian National Lok Dal		Lost
4	Hissar	None	Sampat Singh	Indian National Lok Dal		Lost
5	Karnal	None	Ishwar Dayal Swami	Bharatiya Janata Party		Lost
6	Sonepat	None	Kishan Singh Sangwan	Bharatiya Janata Party		Lost
7	Rohtak	None	Nafe Singh Rathee	Indian National Lok Dal		Lost
8	Bhiwani-Mahendragarh	None	Ajay Singh Chautala	Indian National Lok Dal		Lost
9	Gurgaon	None	Sudha Yadav	Bharatiya Janata Party		Lost
10	Faridabad	None	Ram Chander Bainda	Bharatiya Janata Party		Lost

== Himachal Pradesh ==
BJP (4)

Constituency No.	Constituency	Reserved for (SC/ST/None)	Candidate	Party	Poll On	Result
1	Kangra	None	Rajan Sushant	Bharatiya Janata Party		Won
2	Mandi	None	Maheshwar Singh	Bharatiya Janata Party		Lost
3	Hamirpur	None	Anurag Thakur	Bharatiya Janata Party		Won
4	Shimla	SC	Virender Kashyap	Bharatiya Janata Party		Won

== Jammu and Kashmir ==
BJP (4)

Constituency No.	Constituency	Reserved for (SC/ST/None)	Candidate	Party	Poll On	Result
1	Baramulla	None	None			
2	Srinagar	None	Avtar Krishen Pandita	Bharatiya Janata Party		Lost
3	Anantnag	None	Mohd Sidiq Khan	Bharatiya Janata Party		Lost
4	Ladakh	None	None			
5	Udhampur	None	Nirmal Singh	Bharatiya Janata Party		Lost
6	Jammu	None	Lila Karan Sharma	Bharatiya Janata Party		Lost

== Jharkhand ==
BJP (12) JD(U) (2)

Constituency No.	Constituency	Reserved for (SC/ST/None)	Candidate	Party	Poll On	Result
1	Rajmahal	ST	Devidhan Besra	Bharatiya Janata Party		Won
2	Dumka	ST	Sunil Soren	Bharatiya Janata Party		Lost
3	Godda	None	Nishikant Dubey	Bharatiya Janata Party		Won
4	Chatra	None	Arun Kumar Yadav	Janata Dal (United)		Lost
5	Kodarma	None	Laxman Swarnkar	Bharatiya Janata Party		Lost
6	Giridih	None	Ravindra Kumar Pandey	Bharatiya Janata Party		Won
7	Dhanbad	None	Pashupati Nath Singh	Bharatiya Janata Party		Won
8	Ranchi	None	Ram Tahal Chaudhary	Bharatiya Janata Party		Lost
9	Jamshedpur	None	Arjun Munda	Bharatiya Janata Party		Won
10	Singhbhum	SC	Barkuwar Gagrai	Bharatiya Janata Party		Lost
11	Khunti	ST	Kariya Munda	Bharatiya Janata Party		Won
12	Lohardaga	ST	Sudarshan Bhagat	Bharatiya Janata Party		Won
13	Palamau	SC	Radha Krishna Kishore	Janata Dal (United)		Lost
14	Hazaribagh	None	Yashwant Sinha	Bharatiya Janata Party		Won

== Karnataka ==
BJP (28)

Constituency No.	Constituency	Reserved for (SC/ST/None)	Candidate	Party	Poll On	Result
1	Chikkodi	None	Ramesh Vishwanath Katti	Bharatiya Janata Party		Won
2	Belgaum	None	Suresh Angadi	Bharatiya Janata Party		Won
3	Bagalkot	None	P. C. Gaddigoudar	Bharatiya Janata Party		Won
4	Bijapur	SC	Ramesh Chandappa Jigajinagi	Bharatiya Janata Party		Won
5	Gulbarga	SC	Revu Naik Belamgi	Bharatiya Janata Party		Lost
6	Raichur	ST	Sanna Pakirappa	Bharatiya Janata Party		Won
7	Bidar	None	Gurupadappa Nagamarapalli	Bharatiya Janata Party		Lost
8	Koppal	None	Shivaramagouda Shivanagouda	Bharatiya Janata Party		Won
9	Bellary	ST	J. Shantha	Bharatiya Janata Party		Won
10	Haveri	None	Shivakumar Udasi	Bharatiya Janata Party		Won
11	Dharwad	None	Pralhad Joshi	Bharatiya Janata Party		Won
12	Uttara Kannada	None	Anant Kumar Hegde	Bharatiya Janata Party		Won
13	Davanagere	None	G. M. Siddeswara	Bharatiya Janata Party		Won
14	Shimoga	None	B. Y. Raghavendra	Bharatiya Janata Party		Won
15	Udupi Chikmagalur	None	D. V. Sadananda Gowda	Bharatiya Janata Party		Won
16	Hassan	None	K. H. Hanume Gowda	Bharatiya Janata Party		Lost
17	Dakshina Kannada	None	Nalin Kumar Kateel	Bharatiya Janata Party		Won
18	Chitradurga	SC	Janardhana Swamy	Bharatiya Janata Party		Won
19	Tumkur	None	G. S. Basavaraj	Bharatiya Janata Party		Won
20	Mandya	None	L. R. Shivarame Gowda	Bharatiya Janata Party		Lost
21	Mysore	None	C. H. Vijayashankar	Bharatiya Janata Party		Lost
22	Chamarajanagar	SC	A. R. Krishna Murthy	Bharatiya Janata Party		Lost
23	Bangalore Rural	None	C. P. Yogeeshwara	Bharatiya Janata Party		Lost
24	Bangalore North	None	D. B. Chandre Gowda	Bharatiya Janata Party		Won
25	Bangalore Central	None	P. C. Mohan	Bharatiya Janata Party		Won
26	Bangalore South	None	Ananth Kumar	Bharatiya Janata Party		Won
27	Chikballapur	None	C.Aswathanarayana	Bharatiya Janata Party		Lost
28	Kolar	SC	D. S. Veeraiah	Bharatiya Janata Party		Lost

== Kerala ==
BJP (19) JD(U) (1)

Constituency No.	Constituency	Reserved for (SC/ST/None)	Candidate	Party	Poll On	Result
1	Kasaragod	None	K Surendran	Bharatiya Janata Party		Lost
2	Kannur	None	P.P Karunakaran Master	Bharatiya Janata Party		Lost
3	Vatakara	None	K.P Sreesan	Bharatiya Janata Party		Lost
4	Wayanad	None	C. Vasudevan Master	Bharatiya Janata Party		Lost
5	Kozhikode	None	V. Muraleedharan	Bharatiya Janata Party		Lost
6	Malappuram	None	N. Aravindan	Bharatiya Janata Party		Lost
7	Ponnani	None	K. Janachandran Master	Bharatiya Janata Party		Lost
8	Palakkad	None	C.K. Padmanabhan	Bharatiya Janata Party		Lost
9	Alathur	SC	M. Bindu Teacher	Bharatiya Janata Party		Lost
10	Thrissur	None	Rema Regunandan	Bharatiya Janata Party		Lost
11	Chalakudy	None	K.V. Sabu	Bharatiya Janata Party		Lost
12	Ernakulam	None	A.N. Radhakrishnan	Bharatiya Janata Party		Lost
13	Idukki	None	Sreenagari Rajan	Bharatiya Janata Party		Lost
14	Kottayam	None	Narayanan Namboothiri	Bharatiya Janata Party		Lost
15	Alappuzha	None	P.J Kurian	Janata Dal (United)		Lost
16	Mavelikara	SC	P.M Velayudhan	Bharatiya Janata Party		Lost
17	Pathanamthitta	None	B.Radhakrishna Menon	Bharatiya Janata Party		Lost
18	Kollam	None	Vayakkal Madhu	Bharatiya Janata Party		Lost
19	Attingal	None	Thottakkadu Sasi	Bharatiya Janata Party		Lost
20	Thiruvananthapuram	None	P. K. Krishna Das	Bharatiya Janata Party		Lost

== Madhya Pradesh ==
BJP (29)

Constituency No.	Constituency	Reserved for (SC/ST/None)	Candidate	Party	Poll On	Result
1	Morena	None	Anup Mishra	Bharatiya Janata Party		Won
2	Bhind	SC	Bhagirath Prasad	Bharatiya Janata Party		Won
3	Gwalior	None	Narendra Singh Tomar	Bharatiya Janata Party		Won
4	Guna	None	Narottam Mishra	Bharatiya Janata Party		Lost
5	Sagar	None	Bhupendra Singh	Bharatiya Janata Party		Won
6	Tikamgarh	SC	Virendra Kumar Khatik	Bharatiya Janata Party		Won
7	Damoh	None	Shivraj Singh Lodhi	Bharatiya Janata Party		Won
8	Khajuraho	None	Jeetendra Singh Bundela	Bharatiya Janata Party		Won
9	Satna	None	Ganesh Singh	Bharatiya Janata Party		Won
10	Rewa	None	Chandramani Tripathi	Bharatiya Janata Party		Lost
11	Sidhi	None	Govind Prasad Mishra	Bharatiya Janata Party		Won
12	Shahdol	ST	Narendra Singh Maravi	Bharatiya Janata Party		Lost
13	Jabalpur	None	Rakesh Singh	Bharatiya Janata Party		Won
14	Mandla	ST	Faggan Singh Kulaste	Bharatiya Janata Party		Lost
15	Balaghat	None	K. D. Deshmukh	Bharatiya Janata Party		Won
16	Chhindwara	None	Marot Rao Khavase	Bharatiya Janata Party		Lost
17	Hoshangabad	None	Rampal Singh	Bharatiya Janata Party		Lost
18	Vidisha	None	Sushma Swaraj	Bharatiya Janata Party		Won
19	Bhopal	None	Kailash Chandra Joshi	Bharatiya Janata Party		Won
20	Rajgarh	None	Lakshman Singh	Bharatiya Janata Party		Lost
21	Dewas	SC	Thawar Chand Gehlot	Bharatiya Janata Party		Lost
22	Ujjain	SC	Dr. Satyanarayan Jatiya	Bharatiya Janata Party		Lost
23	Mandsaur	None	Laxminarayan Pandey	Bharatiya Janata Party		Lost
24	Ratlam	ST	Dilip Singh Bhuria	Bharatiya Janata Party		Lost
25	Dhar	ST	Mukam Singh Kirade	Bharatiya Janata Party		Lost
26	Indore	None	Sumitra Mahajan	Bharatiya Janata Party		Won
27	Khargone	ST	Makhansingh Solanki	Bharatiya Janata Party		Won
28	Khandwa	None	Nand Kumar Singh Chauhan	Bharatiya Janata Party		Lost
29	Betul	ST	Jyoti Dhurve	Bharatiya Janata Party		Lost

== Maharashtra ==
BJP (25) SS (22) IND (1)

Constituency No.	Constituency	Reserved for (SC/ST/None)	Candidate	Party	Poll On	Result
1	Nandurbar	ST	Suhas Natawadkar Jayant	Bharatiya Janata Party		Lost
2	Dhule	None	Pratap Narayanrao Sonawane	Bharatiya Janata Party		Won
3	Jalgaon	None	Ashok Tapiram Patil	Bharatiya Janata Party		Won
4	Raver	None	Haribhau Jawale	Bharatiya Janata Party		Won
5	Buldhana	None	Prataprao Jadhav	Shiv Sena		Won
6	Akola	None	Sanjya Dhotre	Bharatiya Janata Party		Won
7	Amravati	SC	Anandrao Adsul	Shiv Sena		Won
8	Wardha	None	Suresh Wagmare	Bharatiya Janata Party		Lost
9	Ramtek	SC	Krupal Tumane	Shiv Sena		Lost
10	Nagpur	None	Banwarilal Purohit	Bharatiya Janata Party		Lost
11	Bhandara-Gondiya	None	Shishupal Patle	Bharatiya Janata Party		Lost
12	Gadchiroli-Chimur	ST	Ashok Nete	Bharatiya Janata Party		Lost
13	Chandrapur	None	Hansraj Ahir	Bharatiya Janata Party		Won
14	Yavatmal-Washim	None	Bhavna Gawli	Shiv Sena		Won
15	Hingoli	None	Subhash Bapurao Wankhede	Shiv Sena		Won
16	Nanded	None	Sambhaji Pawar	Bharatiya Janata Party		Lost
17	Parbhani	None	Ganeshrao Dudhgaonkar	Shiv Sena		Won
18	Jalna	None	Ravsaheb Danve Patil	Bharatiya Janata Party		Won
19	Aurangabad	None	Chandrakant Khaire	Shiv Sena		Won
20	Dindori	ST	Harischandra Chavan	Bharatiya Janata Party		Won
21	Nashik	None	Datta Namdeo Gaikwad	Shiv Sena		Lost
22	Palghar	ST	Chintaman Vanga	Bharatiya Janata Party		Lost
23	Bhiwandi	None	Jagannath Patil	Bharatiya Janata Party		Lost
24	Kalyan	None	Anand Paranjpe	Shiv Sena		Won
25	Thane	None	Vijay Chougule	Shiv Sena		Lost
26	Mumbai North	None	Ram Naik	Bharatiya Janata Party		Lost
27	Mumbai North West	None	Gajanan Kirtikar	Shiv Sena		Lost
28	Mumbai North East	None	Dr. Kirit Somaiya	Bharatiya Janata Party		Lost
29	Mumbai North Central	None	Mahesh Ram Jethmalani	Bharatiya Janata Party		Lost
30	Mumbai South Central	None	Suresh Anant Gambhir	Shiv Sena		Lost
31	Mumbai South	None	Mohan Rawale	Shiv Sena		Lost
32	Raigad	None	Anant Geete	Shiv Sena		Won
33	Maval	None	Gajanan Babar	Shiv Sena		Won
34	Pune	None	Anil Shirole	Bharatiya Janata Party		Lost
35	Baramati	None	Kanta Nalawade	Bharatiya Janata Party		Lost
36	Shirur	None	Shivajirao Adhalarao Patil	Shiv Sena		Won
37	Ahmednagar	None	Dilip Gandhi	Bharatiya Janata Party		Won
38	Shirdi	SC	Bhausaheb Wakchaure	Shiv Sena		Won
39	Beed	None	Gopinath Munde	Bharatiya Janata Party		Won
40	Osmanabad	None	Ravindra Gaikwad	Shiv Sena		Lost
41	Latur	SC	Sunil Gaikwad	Bharatiya Janata Party		Lost
42	Solapur	SC	Sharad Bansode	Bharatiya Janata Party		Lost
43	Madha	None	Subhash Sureshchandra Deshmukh	Bharatiya Janata Party		Lost
44	Sangli	None	Ajitrao Ghorpade	Independent		Lost
45	Satara	None	Purushottam Jadhav	Shiv Sena		Lost
46	Ratnagiri–Sindhudurg	None	Suresh Prabhu	Shiv Sena		Lost
47	Kolhapur	None	Devane Vijay Shamrao	Shiv Sena		Lost
48	Hatkanangle	None	Raghunath Patil	Shiv Sena		Lost

== Manipur ==
BJP (2)

Constituency No.	Constituency	Reserved for (SC/ST/None)	Candidate	Party	Poll On	Result
1	Inner Manipur	None	Wahengbam Nipamacha Singh	Bharatiya Janata Party		Lost
2	Outer Manipur	ST	D. Loli Adanee	Bharatiya Janata Party		Lost

== Meghalaya ==
Constituency No.	Constituency	Reserved for (SC/ST/None)	Candidate	Party	Poll On	Result
1	Shillong	None	None			
2	Tura	ST	None			

== Mizoram ==
Independent (1)

Constituency No.	Constituency	Reserved for (SC/ST/None)	Candidate	Party	Poll On	Result
1	Mizoram	ST	H. Lallungmuana	Independent		Lost

== Nagaland ==
NPF (1)

Constituency No.	Constituency	Reserved for (SC/ST/None)	Candidate	Party	Poll On	Result
1	Nagaland	None	C. M. Chang	Naga People's Front		Won

== Odisha ==
BJP (21)

Constituency No.	Constituency	Reserved for (SC/ST/None)	Candidate	Party	Poll On	Result
1	Bargarh	None	Radharani Panda	Bharatiya Janata Party		Lost
2	Sundargarh	ST	Jual Oram	Bharatiya Janata Party		Lost
3	Sambalpur	None	Surendra Lath	Bharatiya Janata Party		Lost
4	Keonjhar	ST	Ananta Nayak	Bharatiya Janata Party		Lost
5	Mayurbhanj	ST	Draupadi Murmu	Bharatiya Janata Party		Lost
6	Balasore	None	Kharabela Swain	Bharatiya Janata Party		Lost
7	Bhadrak	SC	Ratha Das	Bharatiya Janata Party		Lost
8	Jajpur	SC	Parameswar Sethi	Bharatiya Janata Party		Lost
9	Dhenkanal	None	Rudra Narayan Pany	Bharatiya Janata Party		Lost
10	Bolangir	None	Sangeeta Kumari Singh Deo	Bharatiya Janata Party		Lost
11	Kalahandi	None	Bikram Keshari Deo	Bharatiya Janata Party		Lost
12	Nabarangpur	ST	Parsuram Majhi	Bharatiya Janata Party		Lost
13	Kandhamal	None	Ashok Sahu	Bharatiya Janata Party		Lost
14	Cuttack	None	Anadi Sahu	Bharatiya Janata Party		Lost
15	Kendrapara	None	Jnandev Beura	Bharatiya Janata Party		Lost
16	Jagatsinghpur	SC	Baidhar Mallik	Bharatiya Janata Party		Lost
17	Puri	None	Braja Kishore Tripathy	Bharatiya Janata Party		Lost
18	Bhubaneswar	None	Archana Nayak	Bharatiya Janata Party		Lost
19	Aska	None	Shanti Devi	Bharatiya Janata Party		Lost
20	Berhampur	None	Bharat Paik	Bharatiya Janata Party		Lost
21	Koraput	ST	Upendra Majhi	Bharatiya Janata Party		Lost

== Punjab ==
SAD (10) BJP (3)

Constituency No.	Constituency	Reserved for (SC/ST/None)	Candidate	Party	Poll On	Result
1	Gurdaspur	None	Vinod Khanna	Bharatiya Janata Party		Lost
2	Amritsar	None	Navjot Singh Sidhu	Bharatiya Janata Party		Won
3	Khadoor Sahib	None	Rattan Singh Ajnala	Shiromani Akali Dal		Won
4	Jalandhar	SC	Hans Raj Hans	Shiromani Akali Dal		Lost
5	Hoshiarpur	SC	Som Parkash	Bharatiya Janata Party		Lost
6	Anandpur Sahib	None	Daljit Singh Cheema	Shiromani Akali Dal		Lost
7	Ludhiana	None	Gurcharan Singh Galib	Shiromani Akali Dal		Lost
8	Fatehgarh Sahib	SC	Kulwant Singh	Shiromani Akali Dal		Lost
9	Faridkot	SC	Paramjit Kaur Gulshan	Shiromani Akali Dal		Won
10	Firozpur	None	Sher Singh Ghubaya	Shiromani Akali Dal		Won
11	Bathinda	None	Harsimrat Kaur Badal	Shiromani Akali Dal		Won
12	Sangrur	None	Sukhdev Singh Dhindsa	Shiromani Akali Dal		Lost
13	Patiala	None	Prem Singh Chandumajra	Shiromani Akali Dal		Lost

== Rajasthan ==
BJP (25)

Constituency No.	Constituency	Reserved for (SC/ST/None)	Candidate	Party	Poll On	Result
1	Ganganagar	SC	Nihalchand Meghwal	Bharatiya Janata Party		Lost
2	Bikaner	SC	Arjun Ram Meghwal	Bharatiya Janata Party		Won
3	Churu	None	Ram Singh Kaswan	Bharatiya Janata Party		Won
4	Jhunjhunu	None	Dasrath Singh Shekhawat	Bharatiya Janata Party		Lost
5	Sikar	None	Subhash Maharia	Bharatiya Janata Party		Lost
6	Jaipur Rural	None	Rao Rajendra Singh	Bharatiya Janata Party		Lost
7	Jaipur	None	Ghanshyam Tiwari	Bharatiya Janata Party		Lost
8	Alwar	None	Kiran Yadav	Bharatiya Janata Party		Lost
9	Bharatpur	SC	Khemchand	Bharatiya Janata Party		Lost
10	Karauli-Dholpur	SC	Manoj Rajoria	Bharatiya Janata Party		Lost
11	Dausa	ST	Ram Kishore Meena	Bharatiya Janata Party		Lost
12	Tonk-Sawai Madhopur	None	Kirori Singh Bainsla	Bharatiya Janata Party		Lost
13	Ajmer	None	Kiran Maheshwari	Bharatiya Janata Party		Lost
14	Nagaur	None	Bindu Chaudhary	Bharatiya Janata Party		Lost
15	Pali	None	Pusp Jain	Bharatiya Janata Party		Lost
16	Jodhpur	None	Jaswant Singh Bishnoi	Bharatiya Janata Party		Lost
17	Barmer	None	Manvendra Singh	Bharatiya Janata Party		Lost
18	Jalore	None	Devji M Patel	Bharatiya Janata Party		Won
19	Udaipur	ST	Mahaveer Bhagora	Bharatiya Janata Party		Lost
20	Banswara	ST	Hakaru Maida	Bharatiya Janata Party		Lost
21	Chittorgarh	None	Shrichand Kriplani	Bharatiya Janata Party		Lost
22	Rajsamand	None	Rasa Singh Rawat	Bharatiya Janata Party		Lost
23	Bhilwara	None	V. P. Singh Badnore	Bharatiya Janata Party		Lost
24	Kota	None	Shyam Sharma	Bharatiya Janata Party		Lost
25	Jhalawar-Baran	None	Dushyant Singh	Bharatiya Janata Party		Won

== Sikkim ==
BJP (1)

Constituency No.	Constituency	Reserved for (SC/ST/None)	Candidate	Party	Poll On	Result
1	Sikkim	None	Padam BDR. Chettri	Bharatiya Janata Party		Lost

== Tamil Nadu ==
BJP (18) JD(U) (2) SS (2)

Constituency No.	Constituency	Reserved for (SC/ST/None)	Candidate	Party	Poll On	Result
1	Thiruvallur	SC	M.S. Sudharsan	Janata Dal (United)		Lost
2	Chennai North	None	Tamilisai Soundararajan	Bharatiya Janata Party		Lost
3	Chennai South	None	La Ganesan	Bharatiya Janata Party		Lost
4	Chennai Central	None	Raaj Ramchand	Shiv Sena		Lost
5	Sriperumbudur	None	T Varatharajan	Shiv Sena		Lost
6	Kancheepuram	SC	None			
7	Arakkonam	None	K Shanmugam	Janata Dal (United)		Lost
8	Vellore	None	Rajendiran A K	Bharatiya Janata Party		Lost
9	Krishnagiri	None	G. Balakrishnan	Bharatiya Janata Party		Lost
10	Dharmapuri	None	None			
11	Tiruvannamalai	None	None			
12	Arani	None	None			
13	Villupuram	SC	None			
14	Kallakurichi	None	None			
15	Salem	None	None			
16	Namakkal	None	K Suresh Gandhi	Bharatiya Janata Party		Lost
17	Erode	None	Palanisamy.N.P.	Bharatiya Janata Party		Lost
18	Tiruppur	None	M Sivakumar	Bharatiya Janata Party		Lost
19	Nilgiris	SC	S Gurumurthy	Bharatiya Janata Party		Lost
20	Coimbatore	None	Selvakumar.G.K.S	Bharatiya Janata Party		Lost
21	Pollachi	None	Baba Ramesh.V.S	Bharatiya Janata Party		Lost
22	Dindigul	None	None			
23	Karur	None	None			
24	Tiruchirappalli	None	Lalitha Kumaramangalam	Bharatiya Janata Party		Lost
25	Perambalur	None	None			
26	Cuddalore	None	None			
27	Chidambaram	SC	None			
28	Mayiladuthurai	None	Karthikeyan S	Bharatiya Janata Party		Lost
29	Nagapattinam	SC	None			
30	Thanjavur	None	None			
31	Sivaganga	None	None			
32	Madurai	None	None			
33	Theni	None	A Parvathi	Bharatiya Janata Party		Lost
34	Virudhunagar	None	M Karthik	Bharatiya Janata Party		Lost
35	Ramanathapuram	None	Su. Thirunavukkarasar	Bharatiya Janata Party		Lost
36	Thoothukudi	None	S Saravanan	Bharatiya Janata Party		Lost
37	Tenkasi	SC	None			
38	Tirunelveli	None	Nagarajan Karu	Bharatiya Janata Party		Lost
39	Kanyakumari	None	Pon Radhakrishnan	Bharatiya Janata Party		Lost

== Tripura ==
BJP (2)

Constituency No.	Constituency	Reserved for (SC/ST/None)	Candidate	Party	Poll On	Result
1	Tripura West	None	Nilmani Deb	Bharatiya Janata Party		Lost
2	Tripura East	ST	Pulin Behari Dewan	Bharatiya Janata Party		Lost

== Uttar Pradesh ==
BJP (71) RLD (7) JD(U) (2)

Constituency No.	Constituency	Reserved for (SC/ST/None)	Candidate	Party	Poll On	Result
1	Saharanpur	None	Jaswant Singh Saini	Bharatiya Janata Party		Lost
2	Kairana	None	Hukum Singh	Bharatiya Janata Party		Lost
3	Muzaffarnagar	None	Anuradha Choudhary	Rashtriya Lok Dal		Lost
4	Bijnor	None	Sanjay Singh Chauhan	Rashtriya Lok Dal		Won
5	Nagina	SC	Munshi Rampal	Rashtriya Lok Dal		Lost
6	Moradabad	None	Kunwar Sarvesh Singh	Bharatiya Janata Party		Lost
7	Rampur	None	Mukhtar Abbas Naqvi	Bharatiya Janata Party		Lost
8	Sambhal	None	Chandra Pal Singh	Bharatiya Janata Party		Lost
9	Amroha	None	Devendra Nagpal	Rashtriya Lok Dal		Won
10	Meerut	None	Rajendra Agrawal	Bharatiya Janata Party		Won
11	Baghpat	None	Ajit Singh	Rashtriya Lok Dal		Won
12	Ghaziabad	None	Rajnath Singh	Bharatiya Janata Party		Won
13	Gautam Buddha Nagar	None	Dr. Mahesh Sharma	Bharatiya Janata Party		Lost
14	Bulandshahr	SC	Ashok Kumar Pradhan	Bharatiya Janata Party		Lost
15	Aligarh	None	Sheela Gautam	Bharatiya Janata Party		Lost
16	Hathras	SC	Sarika Singh	Rashtriya Lok Dal		Won
17	Mathura	None	Jayant Chaudhary	Rashtriya Lok Dal		Won
18	Agra	SC	Prof. Ram Shankar Katheriya	Bharatiya Janata Party		Won
19	Fatehpur Sikri	None	Raja Mahendra Aridaman Singh	Bharatiya Janata Party		Lost
20	Firozabad	None	Raghuvar Dayal Verma	Bharatiya Janata Party		Lost
21	Mainpuri	None	Tripti Shakya	Bharatiya Janata Party		Lost
22	Etah	None	Shyam Singh Shakya	Bharatiya Janata Party		Lost
23	Badaun	None	D. K. Bhardwaj	Janata Dal (United)		Lost
24	Aonla	None	Maneka Gandhi	Bharatiya Janata Party		Won
25	Bareilly	None	Santosh Gangwar	Bharatiya Janata Party		Lost
26	Pilibhit	None	Varun Gandhi	Bharatiya Janata Party		Won
27	Shahjahanpur	SC	Krishna Raj	Bharatiya Janata Party		Lost
28	Kheri	None	Ajay Mishra	Bharatiya Janata Party		Lost
29	Dhaurahra	None	Raghvendra Singh	Bharatiya Janata Party		Lost
30	Sitapur	None	Gyan Tiwari	Bharatiya Janata Party		Lost
31	Hardoi	SC	Purnima Verma	Bharatiya Janata Party		Lost
32	Misrikh	SC	Anil Kumar	Bharatiya Janata Party		Lost
33	Unnao	None	Ramesh Kumar Singh	Bharatiya Janata Party		Lost
34	Mohanlalganj	SC	Ranjan Kumar Chaudhary	Bharatiya Janata Party		Lost
35	Lucknow	None	Lalji Tandon	Bharatiya Janata Party		Won
36	Rae Bareli	None	R.B.Singh	Bharatiya Janata Party		Lost
37	Amethi	None	Pradeep Kumar Singh	Bharatiya Janata Party		Lost
38	Sultanpur	None	Surya Bhan Singh	Bharatiya Janata Party		Lost
39	Pratapgarh	None	Lakshmi Narain Pandey	Bharatiya Janata Party		Lost
40	Farrukhabad	None	Mithlesh Kumari	Bharatiya Janata Party		Lost
41	Etawah	SC	Kamlesh Verma	Bharatiya Janata Party		Lost
42	Kannauj	None	Subrat Pathak	Bharatiya Janata Party		Lost
43	Kanpur Urban	None	Satish Mahana	Bharatiya Janata Party		Lost
44	Akbarpur	None	Arun Kumar Tiwari	Bharatiya Janata Party		Lost
45	Jalaun	SC	Bhanu Pratap Singh Verma	Bharatiya Janata Party		Lost
46	Jhansi	None	Ravindra Shukla	Bharatiya Janata Party		Lost
47	Hamirpur	None	Preetam Singh Lodhi	Bharatiya Janata Party		Lost
48	Banda	None	Amita Bajpai	Bharatiya Janata Party		Lost
49	Fatehpur	None	Radhe Shyam Gupta	Bharatiya Janata Party		Lost
50	Kaushambi	SC	Gautam Chaudhary	Bharatiya Janata Party		Lost
51	Phulpur	None	Karan Singh Patel	Bharatiya Janata Party		Lost
52	Allahabad	None	Yogesh Shukla	Bharatiya Janata Party		Lost
53	Barabanki	SC	Ram Naresh Rawat	Bharatiya Janata Party		Lost
54	Faizabad	None	Lallu Singh	Bharatiya Janata Party		Lost
55	Ambedkar Nagar	None	Vinay Katiyar	Bharatiya Janata Party		Lost
56	Bahraich	SC	Akshaibar Lal	Bharatiya Janata Party		Lost
57	Kaiserganj	None	Lalta Prasad Mishra	Bharatiya Janata Party		Lost
58	Shrawasti	None	Satya Deo Singh	Bharatiya Janata Party		Lost
59	Gonda	None	Ram Pratap Singh	Bharatiya Janata Party		Lost
60	Domariyaganj	None	Jai Pratap Singh	Bharatiya Janata Party		Lost
61	Basti	None	Y. D. Singh	Bharatiya Janata Party		Lost
62	Sant Kabir Nagar	None	Sharad Tripathi	Bharatiya Janata Party		Lost
63	Maharajganj	None	Pankaj Choudhary	Bharatiya Janata Party		Lost
64	Gorakhpur	None	Yogi Adityanath	Bharatiya Janata Party		Won
65	Kushi Nagar	None	Vijay Dubey	Bharatiya Janata Party		Lost
66	Deoria	None	Prakash Mani Tripathi	Bharatiya Janata Party		Lost
67	Bansgaon	SC	Kamlesh Paswan	Bharatiya Janata Party		Won
68	Lalganj	SC	Neelam Sonkar	Bharatiya Janata Party		Lost
69	Azamgarh	None	Ramakant Yadav	Bharatiya Janata Party		Won
70	Ghosi	None	Ram Iqbal	Bharatiya Janata Party		Lost
71	Salempur	None	Ravishankar Singh	Janata Dal (United)		Lost
72	Ballia	None	Manoj Sinha	Bharatiya Janata Party		Lost
73	Jaunpur	None	Seema	Bharatiya Janata Party		Lost
74	Machhlishahr	SC	Vidyasagar Sonkar	Bharatiya Janata Party		Lost
75	Ghazipur	None	Prabhunath	Bharatiya Janata Party		Lost
76	Chandauli	None	Mahendra Nath Pandey	Bharatiya Janata Party		Lost
77	Varanasi	None	Murli Manohar Joshi	Bharatiya Janata Party		Won
78	Bhadohi	None	Mahendra Nath Pandey	Bharatiya Janata Party		Lost
79	Mirzapur	None	Anurag Singh	Bharatiya Janata Party		Lost
80	Robertsganj	SC	Ram Shakal	Bharatiya Janata Party		Lost

== Uttarakhand ==
BJP (5)

Constituency No.	Constituency	Reserved for (SC/ST/None)	Candidate	Party	Poll On	Result
1	Tehri Garhwal	None	Jaspal Rana	Bharatiya Janata Party		Lost
2	Garhwal	None	Tejpal Singh Rawat	Bharatiya Janata Party		Lost
3	Almora	SC	Ajay Tamta	Bharatiya Janata Party		Lost
4	Nainital–Udhamsingh Nagar	None	Bachi Singh Rawat	Bharatiya Janata Party		Lost
5	Haridwar	None	Swami Yatindranand Giri	Bharatiya Janata Party		Lost

== West Bengal ==
BJP (42)

Constituency No.	Constituency	Reserved for (SC/ST/None)	Candidate	Party	Poll On	Result
1	Cooch Behar	SC	Bhabendra Nath Barman	Bharatiya Janata Party		Lost
2	Alipurduars	ST	Manoj Tigga	Bharatiya Janata Party		Lost
3	Jalpaiguri	SC	Dwipendra Nath Pramanik	Bharatiya Janata Party		Lost
4	Darjeeling	None	Jaswant Singh	Bharatiya Janata Party		Won
5	Raiganj	None	Gopesh Chandra Sarkar	Bharatiya Janata Party		Lost
6	Balurghat	None	Subhash Chandra Barman	Bharatiya Janata Party		Lost
7	Maldaha Uttar	None	Amlan Bhaduri	Bharatiya Janata Party		Lost
8	Maldaha Dakshin	None	Dipak Kumar Chowdhury	Bharatiya Janata Party		Lost
9	Jangipur	None	Debashish Majumdar	Bharatiya Janata Party		Lost
10	Baharampur	None	Bidyut Kumar Halder	Bharatiya Janata Party		Lost
11	Murshidabad	None	Nirmal Kumar Saha	Bharatiya Janata Party		Lost
12	Krishnanagar	None	Satyabrata Mukherjee	Bharatiya Janata Party		Lost
13	Ranaghat	SC	Sukalyan Ray	Bharatiya Janata Party		Lost
14	Bangaon	SC	Krishnapada Majumder	Bharatiya Janata Party		Lost
15	Barrackpur	None	Prabhakar Tewari	Bharatiya Janata Party		Lost
16	Dum Dum	None	Tapan Sikdar	Bharatiya Janata Party		Lost
17	Barasat	None	Bratin Sengupta	Bharatiya Janata Party		Lost
18	Basirhat	None	Swapan Kumar Das	Bharatiya Janata Party		Lost
19	Jaynagar	SC	Nirode Chandra Halder	Bharatiya Janata Party		Lost
20	Mathurapur	SC	Binay Kumar Biswas	Bharatiya Janata Party		Lost
21	Diamond Harbour	None	Abhijit Das	Bharatiya Janata Party		Lost
22	Jadavpur	None	Sanat Bhattacharya	Bharatiya Janata Party		Lost
23	Kolkata Dakshin	None	Jyotsna Banerjee	Bharatiya Janata Party		Lost
24	Kolkata Uttar	None	Tathagata Roy	Bharatiya Janata Party		Lost
25	Howrah	None	Polly Mukherjee	Bharatiya Janata Party		Lost
26	Uluberia	None	Rahul Chakrabarty	Bharatiya Janata Party		Lost
27	Sreerampur	None	Debabrata Chowdhury	Bharatiya Janata Party		Lost
28	Hooghly	None	Chuni Lal Chakraborty	Bharatiya Janata Party		Lost
29	Arambagh	SC	Murari Bera	Bharatiya Janata Party		Lost
30	Tamluk	None	Rajyashree Chaudhuri	Bharatiya Janata Party		Lost
31	Kanthi	None	Amalesh Mishra	Bharatiya Janata Party		Lost
32	Ghatal	None	Matilal Khatua	Bharatiya Janata Party		Lost
33	Jhargram	ST	Nabendu Mahali	Bharatiya Janata Party		Lost
34	Medinipur	None	Pradip Patnaik	Bharatiya Janata Party		Lost
35	Purulia	None	Sayantan Basu	Bharatiya Janata Party		Lost
36	Bankura	None	Rahul Sinha	Bharatiya Janata Party		Lost
37	Bishnupur	SC	Dr. Jayanta Mondal	Bharatiya Janata Party		Lost
38	Bardhaman Purba	SC	Sankar Halder	Bharatiya Janata Party		Lost
39	Bardhaman-Durgapur	None	Syed Ali Afzal Chand	Bharatiya Janata Party		Lost
40	Asansol	None	Suryya Ray	Bharatiya Janata Party		Lost
41	Bolpur	SC	Arjun Saha	Bharatiya Janata Party		Lost
42	Birbhum	None	Tapas Mukherjee	Bharatiya Janata Party		Lost

== Andaman and Nicobar Islands ==
BJP (1)

Constituency No.	Constituency	Reserved for (SC/ST/None)	Candidate	Party	Poll On	Result
1	Andaman and Nicobar Islands	None	Bishnu Pada Ray	Bharatiya Janata Party		Won

== Chandigarh ==
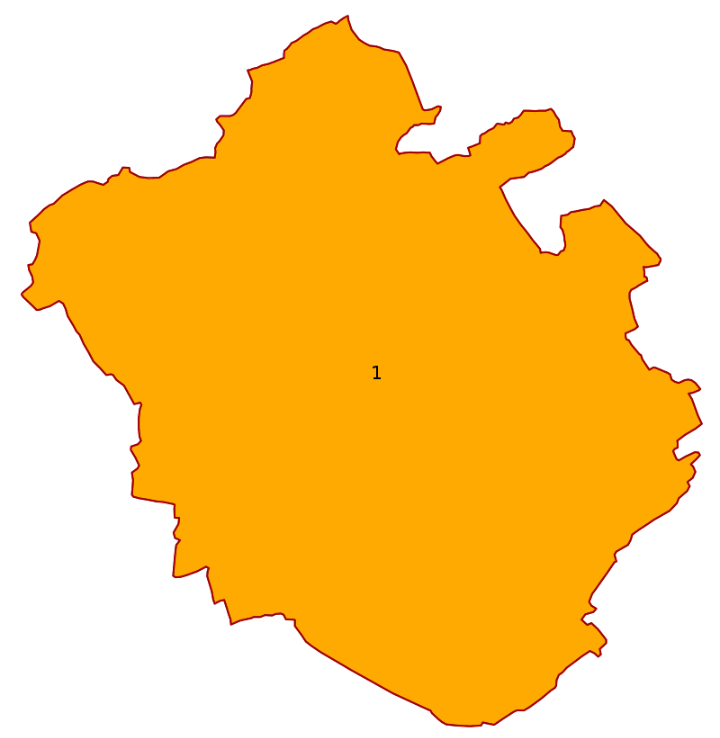

BJP (1)

Constituency No.	Constituency	Reserved for (SC/ST/None)	Candidate	Party	Poll On	Result
1	Chandigarh	None	Satya Pal Jain	Bharatiya Janata Party		Lost

== Dadra and Nagar Haveli (1) ==
BJP (1)

Constituency No.	Constituency	Reserved for (SC/ST/None)	Candidate	Party	Poll On	Result
1	Dadra and Nagar Haveli	None	Natubhai Gomanbhai Patel	Bharatiya Janata Party		Won

== Daman and Diu (1) ==
BJP (1)

Constituency No.	Constituency	Reserved for (SC/ST/None)	Candidate	Party	Poll On	Result
1	Daman and Diu	None	Lalubhai B. Patel	Bharatiya Janata Party		Won

== Lakshadweep (1) ==
BJP (1)

Constituency No.	Constituency	Reserved for (SC/ST/None)	Candidate	Party	Poll On	Result
1	Lakshadweep	ST	K. P. Muthukoya	Bharatiya Janata Party		Lost

== NCT of Delhi (7) ==
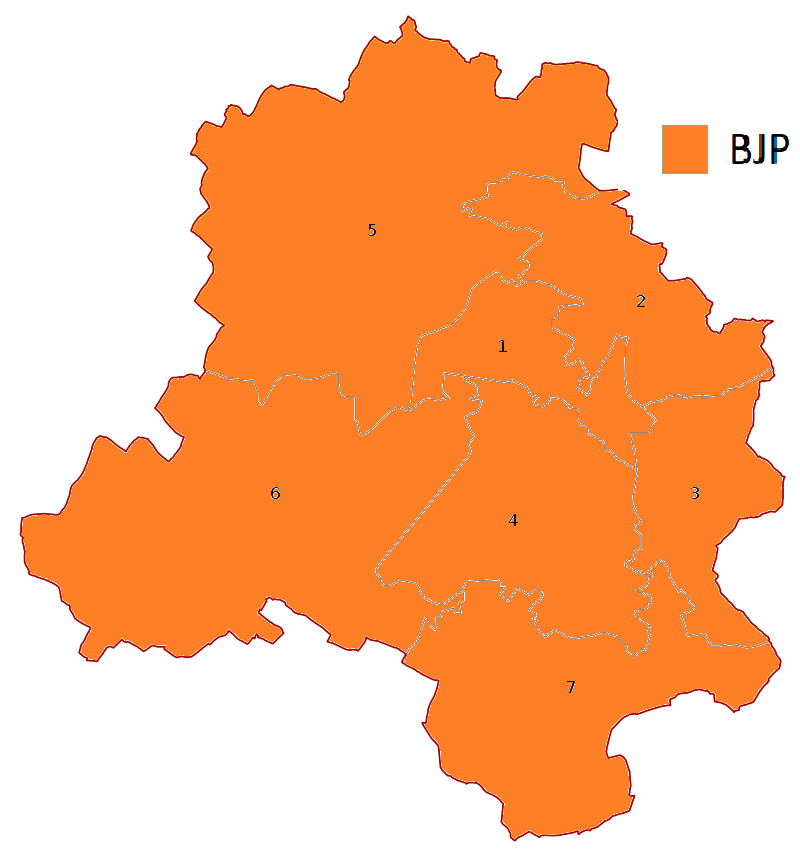

BJP (7)

Constituency No.	Constituency	Reserved for (SC/ST/None)	Candidate	Party	Poll On	Result
1	Chandni Chowk	None	Vijender Gupta	Bharatiya Janata Party		Lost
2	North East Delhi	None	Baikunth Lal Sharma	Bharatiya Janata Party		Lost
3	East Delhi	None	Chetan Chauhan	Bharatiya Janata Party		Lost
4	New Delhi	None	Vijay Goel	Bharatiya Janata Party		Lost
5	North West Delhi	SC	Meera Kanwaria	Bharatiya Janata Party		Lost
6	West Delhi	None	Jagdish Mukhi	Bharatiya Janata Party		Lost
7	South Delhi	None	Ramesh Bidhuri	Bharatiya Janata Party		Lost

== Puducherry (1) ==
BJP (1)

Constituency No.	Constituency	Reserved for (SC/ST/None)	Candidate	Party	Poll On	Result
1	Puducherry	None	M Visweswaran	Bharatiya Janata Party		Lost

== See also ==
List of National Democratic Alliance candidates in the 1998 Indian general election
List of National Democratic Alliance candidates in the 1999 Indian general election
List of National Democratic Alliance candidates in the 2004 Indian general election
List of National Democratic Alliance candidates in the 2009 Indian general election
List of National Democratic Alliance candidates in the 2014 Indian general election
List of National Democratic Alliance candidates in the 2019 Indian general election
List of National Democratic Alliance candidates in the 2024 Indian general election

- List of United Progressive Alliance candidates in the 2009 Indian general election
