= List of United Progressive Alliance candidates in the 2009 Indian general election =

This article contains the full list of candidates fielded by the United Progressive Alliance in the 2009 Indian general election. Official candidates were fielded on a total of 535 seats, one per each seat, predominantly by the Indian National Congress, but also by thirteen allied parties. Independent candidates were fielded on two seats. Official candidates were not fielded in Saran, Vidisha, Hardoi, Ambedkar Nagar, Lalganj, Ballia, Jaunpur and Ghazipur. The official candidates won 262 out of 535 seats.

188 unofficial candidates were fielded in friendly fights by allied parties, across 171 seats. In Tura, the unofficial candidate fielded by the Nationalist Congress Party defeated the official candidate of the Indian National Congress, the only instance of an unofficial candidate winning a seat. This brought the total seats won by the allied parties to 263.

The seat-sharing summary table lists the total number of candidates, both official and unofficial. The state-wise tables below list all the official candidates and only significant unofficial candidates, i.e., those who secured more than 2.75% of the popular vote or else secured more votes than the margin by which the official candidate lost a seat.

== Seat sharing summary ==
Unofficial candidates fielded in friendly fights

Parties	States/UTs	Seats contested		Seats won	
Indian National Congress	Uttar Pradesh	69	440	21	206
Indian National Congress	Andhra Pradesh	42	440	33	206
Indian National Congress	Bihar	37	440	2	206
Indian National Congress	Karnataka	28	440	6	206
Indian National Congress	Madhya Pradesh	28	440	12	206
Indian National Congress	Gujarat	26	440	11	206
Indian National Congress	Maharashtra	25	440	17	206
Indian National Congress	Rajasthan	25	440	20	206
Indian National Congress	Odisha	21	440	6	206
Indian National Congress	Kerala	17	440	13	206
Indian National Congress	Tamil Nadu	15	440	8	206
Indian National Congress	West Bengal	14	440	6	206
Indian National Congress	Assam	13	440	7	206
Indian National Congress	Punjab	13	440	8	206
Indian National Congress	Chhattisgarh	11	440	1	206
Indian National Congress	Haryana	10	440	9	206
Indian National Congress	Jharkhand	9	440	1	206
Indian National Congress	Delhi	7	440	7	206
Indian National Congress	Uttarakhand	5	440	5	206
Indian National Congress	Himachal Pradesh	4	440	1	206
Indian National Congress	Jammu & Kashmir	3	440	2	206
Indian National Congress	Arunachal Pradesh	2	440	2	206
Indian National Congress	Manipur	2	440	2	206
Indian National Congress	Meghalaya	2	440	1	206
Indian National Congress	Tripura	2	440	0	206
Indian National Congress	Andaman & Nicobar Islands	1	440	0	206
Indian National Congress	Chandigarh	1	440	1	206
Indian National Congress	Dadra & Nagar Haveli	1	440	0	206
Indian National Congress	Daman & Diu	1	440	0	206
Indian National Congress	Goa	1	440	1	206
Indian National Congress	Lakshadweep	1	440	1	206
Indian National Congress	Mizoram	1	440	1	206
Indian National Congress	Nagaland	1	440	0	206
Indian National Congress	Puducherry	1	440	1	206
Indian National Congress	Sikkim	1	440	0	206
All India Trinamool Congress	West Bengal	27		19	19
All India Trinamool Congress	Jharkhand	2	8	0	19
All India Trinamool Congress	Tripura	2	8	0	19
All India Trinamool Congress	Kerala	1	8	0	19
All India Trinamool Congress	Nagaland	1	8	0	19
All India Trinamool Congress	Tamil Nadu	1	8	0	19
All India Trinamool Congress	Uttar Pradesh	1	8	0	19
Nationalist Congress Party	Maharashtra	21	23	8	9
Nationalist Congress Party	Bihar	1	23	0	9
Nationalist Congress Party	Goa	1	23	0	9
Nationalist Congress Party	Uttar Pradesh	11	45	0	9
Nationalist Congress Party	Gujarat	7	45	0	9
Nationalist Congress Party	Karnataka	4	45	0	9
Nationalist Congress Party	Kerala	4	45	0	9
Nationalist Congress Party	Assam	3	45	0	9
Nationalist Congress Party	Haryana	3	45	0	9
Nationalist Congress Party	West Bengal	3	45	0	9
Nationalist Congress Party	Andaman & Nicobar Islands	1	45	0	9
Nationalist Congress Party	Bihar	1	45	0	9
Nationalist Congress Party	Daman & Diu	1	45	0	9
Nationalist Congress Party	Lakshadweep	1	45	0	9
Nationalist Congress Party	Manipur	1	45	0	9
Nationalist Congress Party	Meghalaya	1	45	1	9
Nationalist Congress Party	Mizoram	1	45	0	9
Nationalist Congress Party	Odisha	1	45	0	9
Nationalist Congress Party	Tripura	1	45	0	9
Nationalist Congress Party	Uttarakhand	1	45	0	9
Dravida Munnetra Kazhagam	Tamil Nadu	22		18	
Jharkhand Mukti Morcha	Jharkhand	5		2	2
Jharkhand Mukti Morcha	West Bengal	7	37	0	2
Jharkhand Mukti Morcha	Chhattisgarh	6	37	0	2
Jharkhand Mukti Morcha	Tamil Nadu	5	37	0	2
Jharkhand Mukti Morcha	Assam	4	37	0	2
Jharkhand Mukti Morcha	Bihar	4	37	0	2
Jharkhand Mukti Morcha	Odisha	4	37	0	2
Jharkhand Mukti Morcha	Jharkhand	3	37	0	2
Jharkhand Mukti Morcha	Madhya Pradesh	1	37	0	2
Jharkhand Mukti Morcha	Maharashtra	1	37	0	2
Jharkhand Mukti Morcha	Delhi	1	37	0	2
Jharkhand Mukti Morcha	Puducherry	1	37	0	2
Mahan Dal	Uttar Pradesh	4		0	
Jammu & Kashmir National Conference	Jammu & Kashmir	3		3	
Indian Union Muslim League	Kerala	2		2	2
Indian Union Muslim League	West Bengal	6	20	0	2
Indian Union Muslim League	Uttar Pradesh	5	20	0	2
Indian Union Muslim League	Maharashtra	4	20	0	2
Indian Union Muslim League	Bihar	2	20	0	2
Indian Union Muslim League	Andhra Pradesh	1	20	0	2
Indian Union Muslim League	Assam	1	20	0	2
Indian Union Muslim League	Madhya Pradesh	1	20	0	2
Viduthalai Chiruthaigal Katchi	Tamil Nadu	2		1	1
Viduthalai Chiruthaigal Katchi	Kerala	1		0	1
Bodoland People's Front	Assam	1		1	1
Bodoland People's Front	Assam	1		0	1
Kerala Congress (Mani)	Kerala	1		1	
Rashtriya Swabhiman Party	Uttar Pradesh	1		0	0
Rashtriya Swabhiman Party	Uttar Pradesh	7		0	0
Republican Party of India	Maharashtra	1		0	0
Republican Party of India	Uttar Pradesh	6	16	0	0
Republican Party of India	Bihar	2	16	0	0
Republican Party of India	Punjab	2	16	0	0
Republican Party of India	Andhra Pradesh	1	16	0	0
Republican Party of India	Chhattisgarh	1	16	0	0
Republican Party of India	Haryana	1	16	0	0
Republican Party of India	Jammu & Kashmir	1	16	0	0
Republican Party of India	Madhya Pradesh	1	16	0	0
Republican Party of India	Odisha	1	16	0	0
Republican Party of India (Athawale)	Maharashtra	1		0	0
Republican Party of India (Athawale)	Madhya Pradesh	13	53	0	0
Republican Party of India (Athawale)	Uttar Pradesh	11	53	0	0
Republican Party of India (Athawale)	Gujarat	5	53	0	0
Republican Party of India (Athawale)	Andhra Pradesh	3	53	0	0
Republican Party of India (Athawale)	Chhattisgarh	3	53	0	0
Republican Party of India (Athawale)	Delhi	3	53	0	0
Republican Party of India (Athawale)	Haryana	3	53	0	0
Republican Party of India (Athawale)	West Bengal	3	53	0	0
Republican Party of India (Athawale)	Assam	2	53	0	0
Republican Party of India (Athawale)	Tamil Nadu	2	53	0	0
Republican Party of India (Athawale)	Uttarakhand	2	53	0	0
Republican Party of India (Athawale)	Bihar	1	53	0	0
Republican Party of India (Athawale)	Jammu & Kashmir	1	53	0	0
Republican Party of India (Athawale)	Odisha	1	53	0	0
Independents	Bihar	1	2	0	1
Independents	West Bengal	1	2	1	1
Total candidates		535		262	263
Total candidates		188		1	263

== Andhra Pradesh ==
INC (42)

Constituency No.	Constituency	Reserved for (SC/ST/None)	Candidate	Party	Result
1	Adilabad	ST	Kotnak Ramesh	Indian National Congress	Lost
2	Peddapalli	SC	Gaddam Vivek Venkatswamy	Indian National Congress	Won
3	Karimnagar	None	Ponnam Prabhakar Goud	Indian National Congress	Won
4	Nizamabad	None	Madhu Goud Yaskhi	Indian National Congress	Won
5	Zahirabad	None	Suresh Shetkar	Indian National Congress	Won
6	Medak	None	Narendranath	Indian National Congress	Lost
7	Malkajgiri	None	Sarve Satyanarayana	Indian National Congress	Won
8	Secunderabad	None	Anjan Kumar Yadav	Indian National Congress	Won
9	Hyderabad	None	P. Laxman Rao Goud	Indian National Congress	Lost
10	Chevella	None	Jaipal Reddy	Indian National Congress	Won
11	Mahbubnagar	None	Devarakonda Vittal Rao	Indian National Congress	Lost
12	Nagarkurnool	SC	Manda Jagannath	Indian National Congress	Won
13	Nalgonda	None	Gutha Sukender Reddy	Indian National Congress	Won
14	Bhongir	None	Komatireddy Raj Gopal Reddy	Indian National Congress	Won
15	Warangal	SC	Siricilla Rajaiah	Indian National Congress	Won
16	Mahabubabad	ST	Balram Naik	Indian National Congress	Won
17	Khammam	None	Renuka Chowdhury	Indian National Congress	Lost
18	Araku	ST	Kishore Chandra Deo	Indian National Congress	Won
19	Srikakulam	None	Killi Krupa Rani	Indian National Congress	Won
20	Vizianagaram	None	Botsa Jhansi Lakshmi	Indian National Congress	Won
21	Visakhapatnam	None	Daggubati Purandeswari	Indian National Congress	Won
22	Anakapalli	None	Sabbam Hari	Indian National Congress	Won
23	Kakinada	None	M.M.Pallam Raju	Indian National Congress	Won
24	Amalapuram	SC	G. V. Harsha Kumar	Indian National Congress	Won
25	Rajahmundry	None	Vundavalli Aruna Kumar	Indian National Congress	Won
26	Naraspur	None	Kanumuri Bapi Raju	Indian National Congress	Won
27	Eluru	None	Kavuri Sambasiva Rao	Indian National Congress	Won
28	Machilipatnam	None	Badiga Ramakrishna	Indian National Congress	Lost
29	Vijayawada	None	Lagadapati Rajagopal	Indian National Congress	Won
30	Guntur	None	Rayapati Sambasiva Rao	Indian National Congress	Won
31	Narasaraopet	None	Vallabhaneni Balasouri	Indian National Congress	Lost
32	Bapatla	SC	Panabaka Lakshmi	Indian National Congress	Won
33	Ongole	None	Magunta Sreenivasulu Reddy	Indian National Congress	Won
34	Nandyal	None	S.P.Y. Reddy	Indian National Congress	Won
35	Kurnool	None	Kotla Jayasurya Prakasha Reddy	Indian National Congress	Won
36	Anantapur	None	Anantha Venkatarami Reddy	Indian National Congress	Won
37	Hindupur	None	Khasim Khan	Indian National Congress	Lost
38	Kadapa	None	Y. S. Jagan Mohan Reddy	Indian National Congress	Won
39	Nellore	None	Mekapati Rajamohan Reddy	Indian National Congress	Won
40	Tirupati	SC	Chinta Mohan	Indian National Congress	Won
41	Rajampet	None	Sai Prathap Annayyagari	Indian National Congress	Won
42	Chittoor	SC	M. Thippeswamy	Indian National Congress	Lost

== Arunachal Pradesh ==
INC (2)

Constituency No.	Constituency	Reserved for (SC/ST/None)	Candidate	Party	Result
1	Arunachal West	None	Takam Sanjoy	Indian National Congress	Won
2	Arunachal East	None	Ninong Ering	Indian National Congress	Won

== Assam ==
INC (13) BPF (1)

Significant friendly fights - BPF (1)

Constituency No.	Constituency	Reserved for (SC/ST/None)	Candidate	Party	Result
1	Karimganj	SC	Lalit Mohan Suklabaidya	Indian National Congress	Won
2	Silchar	None	Santosh Mohan Dev	Indian National Congress	Lost
3	Autonomous District	ST	Biren Singh Engti	Indian National Congress	Won
4	Dhubri	None	Anwar Hussain	Indian National Congress	Lost
5	Kokrajhar	ST	Sansuma Khunggur Bwiswmuthiary	Bodoland People's Front	Won
6	Barpeta	None	Ismail Hussain	Indian National Congress	Won
7	Gauhati	None	Capt.Robin Bordoloi	Indian National Congress	Lost
8	Mangaldoi (Note: Significant friendly fight between INC and BPF)	None	Madhab Rajbangshi	Indian National Congress	Lost
8	Mangaldoi	None	Dinanath Das	Bodoland People's Front	Lost
9	Tezpur	None	Moni Kumar Subba	Indian National Congress	Lost
10	Nowgong	None	Anil Raja	Indian National Congress	Lost
11	Kaliabor	None	Dip Gogoi	Indian National Congress	Won
12	Jorhat	None	Bijoy Krishna Handique	Indian National Congress	Won
13	Dibrugarh	None	Paban Singh Ghatowar	Indian National Congress	Won
14	Lakhimpur	None	Ranee Narah	Indian National Congress	Won

== Bihar ==
INC (37) NCP (1) IND (1)

Significant friendly fights - JMM (3) NCP (1)

Constituency No.	Constituency	Reserved for (SC/ST/None)	Candidate	Party	Result
1	Valmiki Nagar (Note: Significant friendly fight between INC and NCP)	None	Mohammad Shamim Akhtar	Indian National Congress	Lost
1	Valmiki Nagar	None	Dilip Verma	Nationalist Congress Party	Lost
2	Paschim Champaran	None	Sadhu Yadav	Indian National Congress	Lost
3	Purvi Champaran	None	Arvind Kumar Gupta	Indian National Congress	Lost
4	Sheohar	None	Lovely Anand	Indian National Congress	Lost
5	Sitamarhi	None	Samir Kumar Mahaseth	Indian National Congress	Lost
6	Madhubani	None	Shakeel Ahmad	Indian National Congress	Lost
7	Jhanjharpur	None	Kripanath Pathak	Indian National Congress	Lost
8	Supaul	None	Ranjeet Ranjan	Indian National Congress	Lost
9	Araria	None	Shakeel Ahmad Khan	Indian National Congress	Lost
10	Kishanganj (Note: Significant friendly fight between INC and JMM)	None	Mohammad Asrarul Haque	Indian National Congress	Won
10	Kishanganj	None	Mohammad Nissar Alam	Jharkhand Mukti Morcha	Lost
11	Katihar	None	Tariq Anwar	Nationalist Congress Party	Lost
12	Purnia	None	Shanti Priya	Independent	Lost
13	Madhepura	None	Tara Nand Sada	Indian National Congress	Lost
14	Darbhanga	None	Ajay Kumar Jalan	Indian National Congress	Lost
15	Muzaffarpur	None	Vinita Vijay	Indian National Congress	Lost
16	Vaishali	None	Hind Kesri Yadav	Indian National Congress	Lost
17	Gopalganj	SC	Ramai Ram	Indian National Congress	Lost
18	Siwan	None	Vijay Shanker Dubey	Indian National Congress	Lost
19	Maharajganj	None	Tarkeshwar Singh	Indian National Congress	Lost
20	Saran	None	None		
21	Hajipur	SC	Dasai Choudhary	Indian National Congress	Lost
22	Ujiarpur	None	Sheel Kumar Roy	Indian National Congress	Lost
23	Samastipur	SC	Ashok Kumar	Indian National Congress	Lost
24	Begusarai	None	Amita Bhushan	Indian National Congress	Lost
25	Khagaria	None	Mehboob Ali Kaiser	Indian National Congress	Lost
26	Bhagalpur	None	Sadanand Singh	Indian National Congress	Lost
27	Banka	None	Giridhari Yadav	Indian National Congress	Lost
27	Banka	None	Rajendra Pandit Netajee	Jharkhand Mukti Morcha	Lost
28	Munger	None	Ram Lakhan Singh	Indian National Congress	Lost
29	Nalanda	None	Ramswaroop Prasad	Indian National Congress	Lost
30	Patna Sahib	None	Shekhar Suman	Indian National Congress	Lost
31	Pataliputra	None	Vijay Singh Yadav	Indian National Congress	Lost
32	Arrah	None	Haridwar Prasad Singh	Indian National Congress	Lost
33	Buxar	None	Kamla Kant Tiwary	Indian National Congress	Lost
34	Sasaram	SC	Meira Kumar	Indian National Congress	Won
35	Karakat	None	Awadhesh Kumar Singh	Indian National Congress	Lost
36	Jahanabad	None	Arun Kumar	Indian National Congress	Lost
37	Aurangabad	None	Nikhil Kumar	Indian National Congress	Lost
38	Gaya	SC	Sanjiv Prasad Toni	Indian National Congress	Lost
39	Nawada	None	Sunila Devi	Indian National Congress	Lost
40	Jamui	SC	Ashok Choudhary	Indian National Congress	Lost
40	Jamui	SC	Prasadi Paswan	Jharkhand Mukti Morcha	Lost

== Chhattisgarh ==
INC (11)

Constituency No.	Constituency	Reserved for (SC/ST/None)	Candidate	Party	Result
1	Sarguja	ST	Bhanu Pratap Singh	Indian National Congress	Lost
2	Raigarh	ST	Hridayaram Rathiya	Indian National Congress	Lost
3	Janjgir	SC	Shivkumar Dahariya	Indian National Congress	Lost
4	Korba	None	Charan Das Mahant	Indian National Congress	Won
5	Bilaspur	None	Renu Jogi	Indian National Congress	Lost
6	Rajnandgaon	None	Devwrat Singh	Indian National Congress	Lost
7	Durg	None	Pradeep Choubey	Indian National Congress	Lost
8	Raipur	None	Bhupesh Baghel	Indian National Congress	Lost
9	Mahasamund	None	Motilal Sahu	Indian National Congress	Lost
10	Bastar	ST	Shankar Sodi	Indian National Congress	Lost
11	Kanker	ST	Phulo Devi Netam	Indian National Congress	Lost

== Goa ==
INC (1) NCP (1)

Constituency No.	Constituency	Reserved for (SC/ST/None)	Candidate	Party	Result
1	North Goa	SC	Jitendra Raghuraj Deshprabhu	Nationalist Congress Party	Lost
2	South Goa	None	Francisco Sardinha	Indian National Congress	Won

== Gujarat ==
INC (26)

Significant friendly fights - NCP (1)

Constituency No.	Constituency	Reserved for (SC/ST/None)	Candidate	Party	Result
1	Kachchh	SC	Danicha Valjibhai	Indian National Congress	Lost
2	Banaskantha	None	Gadhvi Mukeshkumar	Indian National Congress	Won
3	Patan	None	Jagdish Thakor	Indian National Congress	Won
4	Mahesana	None	Jivabhai Ambalal Patel	Indian National Congress	Lost
5	Sabarkantha	None	Madhusudan Mistry	Indian National Congress	Lost
6	Gandhinagar	None	Suresh Patel	Indian National Congress	Lost
7	Ahmedabad East	None	Dipakbhai Babaria	Indian National Congress	Lost
8	Ahmedabad West	SC	Shailesh Manharbhai Parmar	Indian National Congress	Lost
9	Surendranagar	None	Somabhai Gandalal Koli Patel	Indian National Congress	Won
10	Rajkot	None	Kuvarjibhai Bavalia	Indian National Congress	Won
11	Porbandar	None	Vitthal Radadiya	Indian National Congress	Won
12	Jamnagar	None	Vikrambhai Arjanbhai Madam	Indian National Congress	Won
13	Junagadh	None	Jashubhai Barad	Indian National Congress	Lost
14	Amreli	None	Virjibhai Thummar	Indian National Congress	Lost
15	Bhavnagar	None	Mahavirsinh Gohil	Indian National Congress	Lost
16	Anand	None	Bharatsinh Solanki	Indian National Congress	Won
17	Kheda	None	Dinsha Patel	Indian National Congress	Won
18	Panchmahal	None	Shankersinh Vaghela	Indian National Congress	Lost
19	Dahod	ST	Prabha Kishor Taviad	Indian National Congress	Won
19	Dahod	ST	Kalsinhbhai Meda	Nationalist Congress Party	Lost
20	Vadodara	None	Satyajitsinh Dulipsinh Gaekwad	Indian National Congress	Lost
21	Chhota Udaipur	ST	Naranbhai Rathwa	Indian National Congress	Lost
22	Bharuch	None	Aziz Tankarvi	Indian National Congress	Lost
23	Bardoli	ST	Tushar Amarsinh Chaudhary	Indian National Congress	Won
24	Surat	None	Dhirubhai Haribhai Gajera	Indian National Congress	Lost
25	Navsari	None	Dhansukh Rajput	Indian National Congress	Lost
26	Valsad	ST	Kishanbhai Vestabhai Patel	Indian National Congress	Won

== Haryana ==
INC (10)

Constituency No.	Constituency	Reserved for (SC/ST/None)	Candidate	Party	Result
1	Ambala	SC	Selja Kumari	Indian National Congress	Won
2	Kurukshetra	None	Naveen Jindal	Indian National Congress	Won
3	Sirsa	SC	Ashok Tanwar	Indian National Congress	Won
4	Hissar	None	Jai Parkash	Indian National Congress	Lost
5	Karnal	None	Arvind Kumar Sharma	Indian National Congress	Won
6	Sonepat	None	Jitender Singh Malik	Indian National Congress	Won
7	Rohtak	None	Deepender Singh Hooda	Indian National Congress	Won
8	Bhiwani-Mahendragarh	None	Shruti Choudhry	Indian National Congress	Won
9	Gurgaon	None	Rao Inderjit Singh	Indian National Congress	Won
10	Faridabad	None	Avtar Singh Bhadana	Indian National Congress	Won

== Himachal Pradesh ==
INC (4)

Constituency No.	Constituency	Reserved for (SC/ST/None)	Candidate	Party	Result
1	Kangra	None	Chander Kumar	Indian National Congress	Lost
2	Mandi	None	Virbhadra Singh	Indian National Congress	Won
3	Hamirpur	None	Narinder Thakur	Indian National Congress	Lost
4	Shimla	SC	Dhani Ram Shandil	Indian National Congress	Lost

== Jammu and Kashmir ==
INC (3) JKNC (3)

Constituency No.	Constituency	Reserved for (SC/ST/None)	Candidate	Party	Result
1	Baramulla	None	Sharifuddin Shariq	Jammu & Kashmir National Conference	Won
2	Srinagar	None	Farooq Abdullah	Jammu & Kashmir National Conference	Won
3	Anantnag	None	Mirza Mehboob Beg	Jammu & Kashmir National Conference	Won
4	Ladakh	None	Phuntsog Namgyal	Indian National Congress	Lost
5	Udhampur	None	CH.Lal Singh	Indian National Congress	Won
6	Jammu	None	Madan Lal Sharma	Indian National Congress	Won

== Jharkhand ==
INC (9) JMM (5)

Significant friendly fights - JMM (3)

Constituency No.	Constituency	Reserved for (SC/ST/None)	Candidate	Party	Result
1	Rajmahal	ST	Hemlal Murmu	Jharkhand Mukti Morcha	Lost
2	Dumka	ST	Sibu Soren	Jharkhand Mukti Morcha	Won
3	Godda	None	Furkan Ansari	Indian National Congress	Lost
3	Godda	None	Durga Soren	Jharkhand Mukti Morcha	Lost
4	Chatra	None	Dhiraj Prasad Sahu	Indian National Congress	Lost
5	Kodarma	None	Tilakdhari Prasad Singh	Indian National Congress	Lost
5	Kodarma	None	Bishnu Prasad Bhaiya	Jharkhand Mukti Morcha	Lost
6	Giridih	None	Tek Lal Mahto	Jharkhand Mukti Morcha	Lost
7	Dhanbad	None	Chandra Shekhar Dubey	Indian National Congress	Lost
8	Ranchi	None	Subodh Kant Sahay	Indian National Congress	Won
9	Jamshedpur	None	Suman Mahato	Jharkhand Mukti Morcha	Lost
10	Singhbhum	ST	Bagun Sumbrai	Indian National Congress	Lost
11	Khunti	ST	Neil Tirkey	Indian National Congress	Lost
12	Lohardaga	ST	Rameshwar Oraon	Indian National Congress	Lost
13	Palamu	SC	Kameshwar Baitha	Jharkhand Mukti Morcha	Won
14	Hazaribagh	None	Saurabh Narain Singh	Indian National Congress	Lost
14	Hazaribagh	None	Shivlal Mahto	Jharkhand Mukti Morcha	Lost

== Karnataka ==
INC (28)

Constituency No.	Constituency	Reserved for (SC/ST/None)	Candidate	Party	Result
1	Chikkodi	None	Prakash Babanna Hukkeri	Indian National Congress	Lost
2	Belgaum	None	Amarsinh Vasantrao Patil	Indian National Congress	Lost
3	Bagalkot	None	J. T. Patil	Indian National Congress	Lost
4	Bijapur	SC	Prakash Rathod	Indian National Congress	Lost
5	Gulbarga	SC	Mallikarjun Kharge	Indian National Congress	Won
6	Raichur	ST	Raja Venkatappa Naik	Indian National Congress	Lost
7	Bidar	None	N. Dharam Singh	Indian National Congress	Won
8	Koppal	None	Basavaraj Rayareddy	Indian National Congress	Lost
9	Bellary	ST	N. Y. Hanumanthappa	Indian National Congress	Lost
10	Haveri	None	Saleem Ahamed	Indian National Congress	Lost
11	Dharwad	None	Manjunath Kunnur	Indian National Congress	Lost
12	Uttara Kannada	None	Margaret Alva	Indian National Congress	Lost
13	Davanagere	None	S. S. Mallikarjun	Indian National Congress	Lost
14	Shimoga	None	S. Bangarappa	Indian National Congress	Lost
15	Udupi Chikmagalur	None	K. Jayaprakash Hegde	Indian National Congress	Lost
16	Hassan	None	B. Shivaramu	Indian National Congress	Lost
17	Dakshina Kannada	None	Janardhana Poojary	Indian National Congress	Lost
18	Chitradurga	SC	B. Thippeswamy	Indian National Congress	Lost
19	Tumkur	None	P. Kodandaramaiah	Indian National Congress	Lost
20	Mandya	None	M. H. Ambareesh	Indian National Congress	Lost
21	Mysore	None	Adagur H. Vishwanath	Indian National Congress	Won
22	Chamarajanagar	SC	R. Dhruvanarayana	Indian National Congress	Won
23	Bangalore Rural	None	Tejashwini Gowda	Indian National Congress	Lost
24	Bangalore North	None	C. K. Jaffer Sharief	Indian National Congress	Lost
25	Bangalore Central	None	H. T. Sangliana	Indian National Congress	Lost
26	Bangalore South	None	Krishna Byre Gowda	Indian National Congress	Lost
27	Chikkballapur	None	Veerappa Moily	Indian National Congress	Won
28	Kolar	SC	K.H. Muniyappa	Indian National Congress	Won

== Kerala ==
INC (17) IUML (2) KC(M) (1)

Significant friendly fights - NCP (2)

Constituency No.	Constituency	Reserved for (SC/ST/None)	Candidate	Party	Result
1	Kasaragod	None	Shahida Kamal	Indian National Congress	Lost
2	Kannur	None	K. Sudhakaran	Indian National Congress	Won
3	Vatakara	None	Mullappally Ramachandran	Indian National Congress	Won
4	Wayanad	None	M. I. Shanavas	Indian National Congress	Won
4	Wayanad	None	K. Muraleedharan	Nationalist Congress Party	Lost
5	Kozhikode	None	M. K. Raghavan	Indian National Congress	Won
6	Malappuram	None	E. Ahamed	Indian Union Muslim League	Won
7	Ponnani	None	E. T. Mohammed Basheer	Indian Union Muslim League	Won
8	Palakkad	None	Satheeshan Pacheni	Indian National Congress	Lost
8	Palakkad	None	Abdul Razak Moulavi	Nationalist Congress Party	Lost
9	Alathur	SC	N.K Sudheer	Indian National Congress	Lost
10	Thrissur	None	P. C. Chacko	Indian National Congress	Won
11	Chalakudy	None	K. P. Dhanapalan	Indian National Congress	Won
12	Ernakulam	None	K. V. Thomas	Indian National Congress	Won
13	Idukki	None	P. T. Thomas	Indian National Congress	Won
14	Kottayam	None	Jose K. Mani	Kerala Congress (M)	Won
15	Alappuzha	None	K. C. Venugopal	Indian National Congress	Won
16	Mavelikara	SC	Kodikunnil Suresh	Indian National Congress	Won
17	Pathanamthitta	None	Anto Antony	Indian National Congress	Won
18	Kollam	None	N. Peethambara Kurup	Indian National Congress	Won
19	Attingal	None	G. Balachandran	Indian National Congress	Lost
20	Thiruvananthapuram	None	Shashi Tharoor	Indian National Congress	Won

== Madhya Pradesh ==
INC (28)

Constituency No.	Constituency	Reserved for (SC/ST/None)	Candidate	Party	Result
1	Morena	None	Ramnivas Rawat	Indian National Congress	Lost
2	Bhind	SC	Bhagirath Prasad	Indian National Congress	Lost
3	Gwalior	None	Ashok Singh	Indian National Congress	Lost
4	Guna	None	Jyotiraditya Madhavrao Scindia	Indian National Congress	Won
5	Sagar	None	Aslam Sher Khan	Indian National Congress	Lost
6	Tikamgarh	SC	Ahirwar Vrindavan	Indian National Congress	Lost
7	Damoh	None	Chandrabhan Bhaiya	Indian National Congress	Lost
8	Khajuraho	None	Raja Pateria	Indian National Congress	Lost
9	Satna	None	Sudhir Singh Tomar	Indian National Congress	Lost
10	Rewa	None	Sundar Lal Tiwari	Indian National Congress	Lost
11	Sidhi	None	Indrajeet Kumar	Indian National Congress	Lost
12	Shahdol	ST	Rajesh Nandini Singh	Indian National Congress	Won
13	Jabalpur	None	Rameshwar Neekhra	Indian National Congress	Lost
14	Mandla	ST	Basori Singh Masram	Indian National Congress	Won
15	Balaghat	None	Vishveshwar Bhagat	Indian National Congress	Lost
16	Chhindwara	None	Kamal Nath	Indian National Congress	Won
17	Hoshangabad	None	Uday Pratap Singh	Indian National Congress	Won
18	Vidisha	None	None (Note: Nomination of the Congress candidate was rejected.)		
19	Bhopal	None	Surendra Singh Thakur	Indian National Congress	Lost
20	Rajgarh	None	Narayan Singh Amlabe	Indian National Congress	Won
21	Dewas	SC	Sajjan Singh Verma	Indian National Congress	Won
22	Ujjain	SC	Premchand Guddu	Indian National Congress	Won
23	Mandsaur	None	Meenakshi Natarajan	Indian National Congress	Won
24	Ratlam	ST	Kantilal Bhuria	Indian National Congress	Won
25	Dhar	ST	Gajendra Singh Rajukhedi	Indian National Congress	Won
26	Indore	None	Satyanarayan Patel	Indian National Congress	Lost
27	Khargone	ST	Balaram Bachchan	Indian National Congress	Lost
28	Khandwa	None	Arun Subhashchandra Yadav	Indian National Congress	Won
29	Betul	ST	Ojharam Evane	Indian National Congress	Lost

== Maharashtra ==
INC (25) NCP (21) RPI (1) RPI(A) (1)

Constituency No.	Constituency	Reserved for (SC/ST/None)	Candidate	Party	Result
1	Nandurbar	ST	Manikrao Hodlya Gavit	Indian National Congress	Won
2	Dhule	None	Amarishbhai Rasiklal Patel	Indian National Congress	Lost
3	Jalgaon	None	Vasantrao More	Nationalist Congress Party	Lost
4	Raver	None	Ravindra Pralhadrao Patil	Nationalist Congress Party	Lost
5	Buldhana	None	Rajendra Shingne	Nationalist Congress Party	Lost
6	Akola	None	Babasaheb Dhabekar	Indian National Congress	Lost
7	Amravati	SC	Rajendra Gavai	Republican Party of India	Lost
8	Wardha	None	Datta Meghe	Indian National Congress	Won
9	Ramtek	SC	Mukul Wasnik	Indian National Congress	Won
10	Nagpur	None	Vilas Muttemwar	Indian National Congress	Won
11	Bhandara-Gondiya	None	Praful Patel	Nationalist Congress Party	Won
12	Gadchiroli-Chimur	ST	Marotrao Kowase	Indian National Congress	Won
13	Chandrapur	None	Pugalia Naresh	Indian National Congress	Lost
14	Yavatmal-Washim	None	Harising Rathod	Indian National Congress	Lost
15	Hingoli	None	Suryakanta Patil	Nationalist Congress Party	Lost
16	Nanded	None	Bhaskarrao Patil	Indian National Congress	Won
17	Parbhani	None	Suresh Warpudkar	Nationalist Congress Party	Lost
18	Jalna	None	Kalyan Vaijinathrao	Indian National Congress	Lost
19	Aurangabad	None	Uttamsingh Pawar	Indian National Congress	Lost
20	Dindori	ST	Zirwal Narhari Sitaram	Nationalist Congress Party	Lost
21	Nashik	None	Sameer Bhujbal	Nationalist Congress Party	Won
22	Palghar	ST	Damodar Barku Shingada	Indian National Congress	Lost
23	Bhiwandi	None	Suresh Kashinath Taware	Indian National Congress	Won
24	Kalyan	None	Davkhare Vasant Shankarrao	Nationalist Congress Party	Lost
25	Thane	None	Sanjeev Naik	Nationalist Congress Party	Won
26	Mumbai North	None	Sanjay Nirupam	Indian National Congress	Won
27	Mumbai North West	None	Gurudas Kamat	Indian National Congress	Won
28	Mumbai North East	None	Sanjay Dina Patil	Nationalist Congress Party	Won
29	Mumbai North Central	None	Priya Dutt	Indian National Congress	Won
30	Mumbai South Central	None	Eknath Gaikwad	Indian National Congress	Won
31	Mumbai South	None	Milind Murli Deora	Indian National Congress	Won
32	Raigad	None	A. R. Antulay	Indian National Congress	Lost
33	Maval	None	Azam Pansare	Nationalist Congress Party	Lost
34	Pune	None	Suresh Kalmadi	Indian National Congress	Won
35	Baramati	None	Supriya Sule	Nationalist Congress Party	Won
36	Shirur	None	Vilas Vithoba Lande	Nationalist Congress Party	Lost
37	Ahmednagar	None	Shivaji Kardile	Nationalist Congress Party	Lost
38	Shirdi	SC	Ramdas Athawale	Republican Party of India (A)	Lost
39	Beed	None	Kokate Ramesh Baburao	Nationalist Congress Party	Lost
40	Osmanabad	None	Padamsinh Bajirao Patil	Nationalist Congress Party	Won
41	Latur	SC	Jaywantrao Awale	Indian National Congress	Won
42	Solapur	SC	Sushilkumar Shinde	Indian National Congress	Won
43	Madha	None	Sharad Pawar	Nationalist Congress Party	Won
44	Sangli	None	Pratik Prakashbapu Patil	Indian National Congress	Won
45	Satara	None	Udayanraje Bhosale	Nationalist Congress Party	Won
46	Ratnagiri–Sindhudurg	None	Nilesh Narayan Rane	Indian National Congress	Won
47	Kolhapur	None	Sambhaji Raje	Nationalist Congress Party	Lost
48	Hatkanangle	None	Nivedita Mane	Nationalist Congress Party	Lost

== Manipur ==
INC (2)

Significant friendly fights - NCP (1)

Constituency No.	Constituency	Reserved for (SC/ST/None)	Candidate	Party	Result
1	Inner Manipur	None	Thokchom Meinya	Indian National Congress	Won
2	Outer Manipur	ST	Thangso Baite	Indian National Congress	Won
2	Outer Manipur	ST	L. B. Sona	Nationalist Congress Party	Lost

== Meghalaya ==
INC (2)

Significant friendly fights - NCP (1)

Constituency No.	Constituency	Reserved for (SC/ST/None)	Candidate	Party	Result
1	Shillong	None	Vincent Pala	Indian National Congress	Won
2	Tura	ST	Deborah Marak	Indian National Congress	Lost
2	Tura	ST	Agatha Sangma	Nationalist Congress Party	Won

== Mizoram ==
INC (1)

Constituency No.	Constituency	Reserved for (SC/ST/None)	Candidate	Party	Result
1	Mizoram	ST	C. L. Ruala	Indian National Congress	Won

== Nagaland ==
INC (1)

Constituency No.	Constituency	Reserved for (SC/ST/None)	Candidate	Party	Result
1	Nagaland	None	K. Asungba Sangtam	Indian National Congress	Lost

== Odisha ==
INC (21)

Significant friendly fights - JMM (3) NCP (1)

Constituency No.	Constituency	Reserved for (SC/ST/None)	Candidate	Party	Result
1	Bargarh	None	Sanjay Bhoi	Indian National Congress	Won
2	Sundargarh	ST	Hemanand Biswal	Indian National Congress	Won
2	Sundargarh	ST	Livinus Kindo	Jharkhand Mukti Morcha	Lost
3	Sambalpur	None	Amarnath Pradhan	Indian National Congress	Won
4	Keonjhar	ST	Dhanurjaya Sidu	Indian National Congress	Lost
5	Mayurbhanj	ST	Laxman Majhi	Indian National Congress	Lost
5	Mayurbhanj	ST	Sudam Marndi	Jharkhand Mukti Morcha	Lost
6	Balasore (Note: Significant friendly fight between INC, NCP and JMM)	None	Srikant Kumar Jena	Indian National Congress	Won
6	Balasore	None	Arun Dey	Nationalist Congress Party	Lost
6	Balasore	None	Arun Jena	Jharkhand Mukti Morcha	Lost
7	Bhadrak	SC	Ananta Prasad Sethi	Indian National Congress	Lost
8	Jajpur	SC	Amiya Kanta Mallik	Indian National Congress	Lost
9	Dhenkanal	None	Chandra Sekhar Tripathi	Indian National Congress	Lost
10	Bolangir	None	Narasingha Mishra	Indian National Congress	Lost
11	Kalahandi	None	Bhakta Charan Das	Indian National Congress	Won
12	Nabarangpur	ST	Pradeep Kumar Majhi	Indian National Congress	Won
13	Kandhamal	None	Suzit Kumar Padhi	Indian National Congress	Lost
14	Cuttack	None	Bibhuti Bhusan Mishra	Indian National Congress	Lost
15	Kendrapara	None	Ranjib Biswal	Indian National Congress	Lost
16	Jagatsinghpur	SC	Rabindra Kumar Sethy	Indian National Congress	Lost
17	Puri	None	Debendra Nath Mansingh	Indian National Congress	Lost
18	Bhubaneswar	None	Bijay Mohanty	Indian National Congress	Lost
19	Aska	None	Ramchandra Rath	Indian National Congress	Lost
20	Berhampur	None	Chandra Sekhar Sahu	Indian National Congress	Lost
21	Koraput	ST	Giridhar Gamang	Indian National Congress	Lost

== Punjab ==
INC (13)

Constituency No.	Constituency	Reserved for (SC/ST/None)	Candidate	Party	Result
1	Gurdaspur	None	Pratap Singh Bajwa	Indian National Congress	Won
2	Amritsar	None	Om Parkash Soni	Indian National Congress	Lost
3	Khadoor Sahib	None	Rana Gurjeet Singh	Indian National Congress	Lost
4	Jalandhar	SC	Mohinder Singh Kaypee	Indian National Congress	Won
5	Hoshiarpur	SC	Santosh Chowdhary	Indian National Congress	Won
6	Anandpur Sahib	None	Ravneet Singh	Indian National Congress	Won
7	Ludhiana	None	Manish Tewari	Indian National Congress	Won
8	Fatehgarh Sahib	SC	Sukhdev Singh	Indian National Congress	Won
9	Faridkot	SC	Sukhwinder Singh Danny	Indian National Congress	Lost
10	Firozpur	None	Jagmeet Singh Brar	Indian National Congress	Lost
11	Bathinda	None	Raninder Singh	Indian National Congress	Lost
12	Sangrur	None	Vijay Inder Singla	Indian National Congress	Won
13	Patiala	None	Preneet Kaur	Indian National Congress	Won

== Rajasthan ==
INC (25)

Constituency No.	Constituency	Reserved for (SC/ST/None)	Candidate	Party	Result
1	Ganganagar	SC	Bharat Ram Meghwal	Indian National Congress	Won
2	Bikaner	SC	Rewat Ram Panwar	Indian National Congress	Lost
3	Churu	None	Rafique Mandelia	Indian National Congress	Lost
4	Jhunjhunu	None	Sheesh Ram Ola	Indian National Congress	Won
5	Sikar	None	Mahadev Singh	Indian National Congress	Won
6	Jaipur Rural	None	Lalchand Kataria	Indian National Congress	Won
7	Jaipur	None	Mahesh Joshi	Indian National Congress	Won
8	Alwar	None	Jitendra Singh	Indian National Congress	Won
9	Bharatpur	SC	Ratan Singh	Indian National Congress	Won
10	Karauli-Dholpur	SC	Khiladi Lal Bairwa	Indian National Congress	Won
11	Dausa	None	Laxman	Indian National Congress	Lost
12	Tonk-Sawai Madhopur	None	Namo Narain Meena	Indian National Congress	Won
13	Ajmer	None	Sachin Pilot	Indian National Congress	Won
14	Nagaur	None	Jyoti Mirdha	Indian National Congress	Won
15	Pali	None	Badri Ram Jakhar	Indian National Congress	Won
16	Jodhpur	None	Chandresh Kumari Katoch	Indian National Congress	Won
17	Barmer	None	Harish Chaudhary	Indian National Congress	Won
18	Jalore	None	Sandhya Choudhary	Indian National Congress	Lost
19	Udaipur	ST	Raghuveer Meena	Indian National Congress	Won
20	Banswara	ST	Tarachand Bhagora	Indian National Congress	Won
21	Chittorgarh	None	Girija Vyas	Indian National Congress	Won
22	Rajsamand	None	Gopal Singh	Indian National Congress	Won
23	Bhilwara	None	C. P. Joshi	Indian National Congress	Won
24	Kota	None	Ijyaraj Singh	Indian National Congress	Won
25	Jhalawar-Baran	None	Urmila Jain Bhaya	Indian National Congress	Lost

== Sikkim ==
INC (1)

Constituency No.	Constituency	Reserved for (SC/ST/None)	Candidate	Party	Result
1	Sikkim	None	Kharananda Upreti	Indian National Congress	Lost

== Tamil Nadu ==
DMK (22) INC (15) VCK (2)

Constituency No.	Constituency	Reserved for (SC/ST/None)	Candidate	Party	Result
1	Thiruvallur	SC	Gayathri.S	Dravida Munnetra Kazhagam	Lost
2	Chennai North	None	T. K. S. Elangovan	Dravida Munnetra Kazhagam	Won
3	Chennai South	None	R. S. Bharathi	Dravida Munnetra Kazhagam	Lost
4	Chennai Central	None	Dayanidhi Maran	Dravida Munnetra Kazhagam	Won
5	Sriperumbudur	None	T. R. Baalu	Dravida Munnetra Kazhagam	Won
6	Kancheepuram	SC	P. Viswanathan	Indian National Congress	Won
7	Arakkonam	None	S. Jagathrakshakan	Dravida Munnetra Kazhagam	Won
8	Vellore	None	Abdul Rahman	Dravida Munnetra Kazhagam (Note: A candidate of IUML who contested on DMK symbol.)	Won
9	Krishnagiri	None	E. G. Sugavanam	Dravida Munnetra Kazhagam	Won
10	Dharmapuri	None	R. Thamaraiselvan	Dravida Munnetra Kazhagam	Won
11	Tiruvannamalai	None	D. Venugopal	Dravida Munnetra Kazhagam	Won
12	Arani	None	Krishnasswamy	Indian National Congress	Won
13	Villupuram	SC	Swamidurai K	Viduthalai Chiruthaigal Katchi	Lost
14	Kallakurichi	None	Sankar Adhi	Dravida Munnetra Kazhagam	Won
15	Salem	None	K. V. Thangkabalu	Indian National Congress	Lost
16	Namakkal	None	S. Gandhiselvan	Dravida Munnetra Kazhagam	Won
17	Erode	None	E. V. K. S. Elangovan	Indian National Congress	Lost
18	Tiruppur	None	S. K. Kharventhan	Indian National Congress	Lost
19	Nilgiris	SC	A Raja	Dravida Munnetra Kazhagam	Won
20	Coimbatore	None	R. Prabhu	Indian National Congress	Lost
21	Pollachi	None	K. Shamugasundaram	Dravida Munnetra Kazhagam	Lost
22	Dindigul	None	N. S. V. Chitthan	Indian National Congress	Won
23	Karur	None	K. C. Palanisamy	Dravida Munnetra Kazhagam	Lost
24	Tiruchirappalli	None	Sarubala.R.Thondaiman	Indian National Congress	Lost
25	Perambalur	None	Napoleon D	Dravida Munnetra Kazhagam	Won
26	Cuddalore	None	K. S. Alagiri	Indian National Congress	Won
27	Chidambaram	SC	Thol. Thirumavalavan	Viduthalai Chiruthaigal Katchi	Won
28	Mayiladuthurai	None	Mani Shankar Aiyar	Indian National Congress	Lost
29	Nagapattinam	SC	A. K. S. Vijayan	Dravida Munnetra Kazhagam	Won
30	Thanjavur	None	S. S. Palanimanickam	Dravida Munnetra Kazhagam	Won
31	Sivaganga	None	P. Chidambaram	Indian National Congress	Won
32	Madurai	None	M. K. Alagiri	Dravida Munnetra Kazhagam	Won
33	Theni	None	J. M. Aaroon Rashid	Indian National Congress	Won
34	Virudhunagar	None	Manicka Tagore	Indian National Congress	Won
35	Ramanathapuram	None	J. K. Rithesh	Dravida Munnetra Kazhagam	Won
36	Thoothukudi	None	S. R. Jeyadurai	Dravida Munnetra Kazhagam	Won
37	Tenkasi	SC	Vellaipandi G	Indian National Congress	Lost
38	Tirunelveli	None	S. S. Ramasubbu	Indian National Congress	Won
39	Kanyakumari	None	J. Helen Davidson	Dravida Munnetra Kazhagam	Won

== Tripura ==
INC (2)

Constituency No.	Constituency	Reserved for (SC/ST/None)	Candidate	Party	Result
1	Tripura West	None	Sudip Roy Barman	Indian National Congress	Lost
2	Tripura East	ST	Diba Chandra Hrangkhawl	Indian National Congress	Lost

== Uttar Pradesh ==
INC (69) MD (4) RSBP (1)

Significant friendly fights - NCP (1)

Constituency No.	Constituency	Reserved for (SC/ST/None)	Candidate	Party	Result
1	Saharanpur	None	Gajay Singh	Indian National Congress	Lost
2	Kairana	None	Surendra Kumar	Indian National Congress	Lost
3	Muzaffarnagar	None	Harendra Singh Malik	Indian National Congress	Lost
4	Bijnor	None	Saiduzzaman	Indian National Congress	Lost
4	Bijnor	None	Kartar Singh Bhadana	Nationalist Congress Party	Lost
5	Nagina	SC	Isam Singh	Indian National Congress	Lost
6	Moradabad	None	Mohammad Azharuddin	Indian National Congress	Won
7	Rampur	None	Begum Noor Bano	Indian National Congress	Lost
8	Sambhal	None	Chandra Vijay	Indian National Congress	Lost
9	Amroha	None	Nafis Abbasi	Indian National Congress	Lost
10	Meerut	None	Rajendra Sharma	Indian National Congress	Lost
11	Baghpat	None	Sompal	Indian National Congress	Lost
12	Ghaziabad	None	Surendra Prakash Goel	Indian National Congress	Lost
13	Gautam Buddha Nagar	None	Ramesh Chandra Tomar	Indian National Congress	Lost
14	Bulandshahr	SC	Devi Dayal	Indian National Congress	Lost
15	Aligarh	None	Bijendra Singh	Indian National Congress	Lost
16	Hathras	SC	Pradeep Chandel	Indian National Congress	Lost
17	Mathura	None	Manvendra Singh	Indian National Congress	Lost
18	Agra	SC	Prabhu Dayal Katheria	Indian National Congress	Lost
19	Fatehpur Sikri	None	Raj Babbar	Indian National Congress	Lost
20	Firozabad	None	Rajendrapal	Indian National Congress	Lost
21	Mainpuri	None	Praveen Yadav	Mahan Dal	Lost
22	Etah	None	Mahadeepak Singh Shakya	Indian National Congress	Lost
23	Badaun	None	Saleem Iqbal Sherwani	Indian National Congress	Lost
24	Aonla	None	Mehboob Ahmad Khan	Mahan Dal	Lost
25	Bareilly	None	Praveen Singh Aron	Indian National Congress	Won
26	Pilibhit	None	V. M. Singh	Indian National Congress	Lost
27	Shahjahanpur	SC	Umed Singh	Indian National Congress	Lost
28	Kheri	None	Zafar Ali Naqvi	Indian National Congress	Won
29	Dhaurahra	None	Jitin Prasada	Indian National Congress	Won
30	Sitapur	None	Ram Lal Rahi	Indian National Congress	Lost
31	Hardoi	SC	None		
32	Misrikh	SC	Om Prakash	Indian National Congress	Lost
33	Unnao	None	Annu Tandon	Indian National Congress	Won
34	Mohanlalganj	SC	R. K. Chaudhary	Rashtriya Swabhiman Party	Lost
35	Lucknow	None	Rita Bahuguna Joshi	Indian National Congress	Lost
36	Rae Bareli	None	Sonia Gandhi	Indian National Congress	Won
37	Amethi	None	Rahul Gandhi	Indian National Congress	Won
38	Sultanpur	None	Sanjaya Sinh	Indian National Congress	Won
39	Pratapgarh	None	Ratna Singh	Indian National Congress	Won
40	Farrukhabad	None	Salman Khurshid	Indian National Congress	Won
41	Etawah	SC	Shiv Ram Dohre	Mahan Dal	Lost
42	Kannauj	None	Vijay Singh Chauhan	Mahan Dal	Lost
43	Kanpur Urban	None	Sriprakash Jaiswal	Indian National Congress	Won
44	Akbarpur	None	Raja Ram Pal	Indian National Congress	Won
45	Jalaun	SC	Babu Ramadhin Ahirwar	Indian National Congress	Lost
46	Jhansi	None	Pradeep Jain Aditya	Indian National Congress	Won
47	Hamirpur	None	Siddha Gopal Sahu	Indian National Congress	Lost
48	Banda	None	Bhagawan Deen Garg	Indian National Congress	Lost
49	Fatehpur	None	Vibhakar Shastri	Indian National Congress	Lost
50	Kaushambi	SC	Ram Nihor Rakesh	Indian National Congress	Lost
51	Phulpur	None	Dharmraj Singh Patel	Indian National Congress	Lost
52	Allahabad	None	Shyam Krishna Pandey	Indian National Congress	Lost
53	Barabanki	SC	P. L. Punia	Indian National Congress	Won
54	Faizabad	None	Nirmal Khatri	Indian National Congress	Won
55	Ambedkar Nagar	None	None		
56	Bahraich	SC	Kamal Kishor	Indian National Congress	Won
57	Kaiserganj	None	Mohd Aleem	Indian National Congress	Lost
58	Shrawasti	None	Vinay Kumar Pandey	Indian National Congress	Won
59	Gonda	None	Beni Prasad Verma	Indian National Congress	Won
60	Domariyaganj	None	Jagdambika Pal	Indian National Congress	Won
61	Basti	None	Basant Chaudhary	Indian National Congress	Lost
62	Sant Kabir Nagar	None	Fazley Mahamood	Indian National Congress	Lost
63	Maharajganj	None	Harsh Vardhan	Indian National Congress	Won
64	Gorakhpur	None	Lalchand Nishad	Indian National Congress	Lost
65	Kushi Nagar	None	R. P. N. Singh	Indian National Congress	Won
66	Deoria	None	Baleshwar Yadav	Indian National Congress	Lost
67	Bansgaon	SC	Mahabir Prasad	Indian National Congress	Lost
68	Lalganj	SC	None		
69	Azamgarh	None	Santosh Kumar Singh	Indian National Congress	Lost
70	Ghosi	None	Sudha Rai	Indian National Congress	Lost
71	Salempur	None	Bhola Pandey	Indian National Congress	Lost
72	Ballia	None	None		
73	Jaunpur	None	None		
74	Machhlishahr	SC	Tufani Nishad	Indian National Congress	Lost
75	Ghazipur	None	None		
76	Chandauli	None	Tarun Patel	Indian National Congress	Lost
77	Varanasi	None	Ajay Rai	Indian National Congress	Lost
78	Bhadohi	None	Sartaj Imam	Indian National Congress	Lost
79	Mirzapur	None	Lalitesh Pati Tripathi	Indian National Congress	Lost
80	Robertsganj	SC	Bhagwati Prasad Chaudhary	Indian National Congress	Lost

== Uttarakhand ==
INC (5)

Constituency No.	Constituency	Reserved for (SC/ST/None)	Candidate	Party	Result
1	Tehri Garhwal	None	Vijay Bahuguna	Indian National Congress	Won
2	Garhwal	None	Satpal Maharaj	Indian National Congress	Won
3	Almora	SC	Pradeep Tamta	Indian National Congress	Won
4	Nainital–Udhamsingh Nagar	None	K. C. Singh Baba	Indian National Congress	Won
5	Haridwar	None	Harish Rawat	Indian National Congress	Won

== West Bengal ==
AITC (27) INC (14) IND (1)

Significant friendly fights - JMM (2)

Constituency No.	Constituency	Reserved for (SC/ST/None)	Candidate	Party	Result
1	Cooch Behar	SC	Arghya Roy Pradhan	All India Trinamool Congress	Lost
2	Alipurduars	ST	Paban Kumar Lakra	All India Trinamool Congress	Lost
3	Jalpaiguri	SC	Sukhbilas Barma	Indian National Congress	Lost
4	Darjeeling	None	Dawa Narbula	Indian National Congress	Lost
5	Raiganj	None	Deepa Dasmunshi	Indian National Congress	Won
6	Balurghat (Note: Significant friendly fight between AITC and JMM)	None	Biplab Mitra	All India Trinamool Congress	Lost
6	Balurghat	None	Chamru Oram	Jharkhand Mukti Morcha	Lost
7	Maldaha Uttar	None	Mausam Noor	Indian National Congress	Won
8	Maldaha Dakshin	None	Abu Hasem Khan Choudhury	Indian National Congress	Won
9	Jangipur	None	Pranab Mukherjee	Indian National Congress	Won
10	Baharampur	None	Adhir Ranjan Chowdhury	Indian National Congress	Won
11	Murshidabad	None	Abdul Mannan Hossain	Indian National Congress	Won
12	Krishnanagar	None	Tapas Paul	All India Trinamool Congress	Won
13	Ranaghat	SC	Sucharu Ranjan Haldar	All India Trinamool Congress	Won
14	Bangaon	SC	Gobinda Chandra Naskar	All India Trinamool Congress	Won
15	Barrackpur	None	Dinesh Trivedi	All India Trinamool Congress	Won
16	Dum Dum	None	Saugata Roy	All India Trinamool Congress	Won
17	Barasat	None	Kakoli Ghosh Dastidar	All India Trinamool Congress	Won
18	Basirhat	None	SK. Nurul Islam	All India Trinamool Congress	Won
19	Jaynagar	SC	Tarun Mandal	Independent (Note: A candidate of SUCI(C) who contested as an independent.)	Won
20	Mathurapur	SC	Choudhury Mohan Jatua	All India Trinamool Congress	Won
21	Diamond Harbour	None	Somen Mitra	All India Trinamool Congress	Won
22	Jadavpur	None	Kabir Suman	All India Trinamool Congress	Won
23	Kolkata Dakshin	None	Mamata Banerjee	All India Trinamool Congress	Won
24	Kolkata Uttar	None	Sudip Bandyopadhyay	All India Trinamool Congress	Won
25	Howrah	None	Ambica Banerjee	All India Trinamool Congress	Won
26	Uluberia	None	Sultan Ahmed	All India Trinamool Congress	Won
27	Sreerampur	None	Kalyan Banerjee	All India Trinamool Congress	Won
28	Hooghly	None	Ratna De (Nag)	All India Trinamool Congress	Won
29	Arambag	SC	Sambhu Nath Malik	Indian National Congress	Lost
30	Tamluk	None	Suvendu Adhikari	All India Trinamool Congress	Won
31	Kanthi	None	Sisir Adhikari	All India Trinamool Congress	Won
32	Ghatal	None	Noor Alam Chowdhury	All India Trinamool Congress	Lost
33	Jhargram	ST	Amrit Hansda	Indian National Congress	Lost
34	Medinipur	None	Dipak Kumar Ghosh	All India Trinamool Congress	Lost
35	Purulia	None	Santiram Mahato	Indian National Congress	Lost
35	Purulia	None	Ajit Prasad Mahato	Jharkhand Mukti Morcha	Lost
36	Bankura	None	Subrata Mukherjee	Indian National Congress	Lost
37	Bishnupur	SC	Seuli Saha	All India Trinamool Congress	Lost
38	Bardhaman Purba	SC	Ashoke Biswas	All India Trinamool Congress	Lost
39	Bardhaman-Durgapur	None	Nargis Begum	Indian National Congress	Lost
40	Asansol	None	Moloy Ghatak	All India Trinamool Congress	Lost
41	Bolpur	SC	Asit Kumar Mal	Indian National Congress	Lost
42	Birbhum	None	Satabdi Roy	All India Trinamool Congress	Won

== Andaman and Nicobar Islands ==
INC (1)

Significant friendly fights - NCP (1)

Constituency No.	Constituency	Reserved for (SC/ST/None)	Candidate	Party	Result
1	Andaman and Nicobar Islands	None	Kuldeep Rai Sharma	Indian National Congress	Lost
1	Andaman and Nicobar Islands	None	R. S. Uma Bharatthy	Nationalist Congress Party	Lost

== Chandigarh ==
INC (1)

Constituency No.	Constituency	Reserved for (SC/ST/None)	Candidate	Party	Result
1	Chandigarh	None	Pawan Kumar Bansal	Indian National Congress	Won

== Dadra and Nagar Haveli ==
INC (1)

Constituency No.	Constituency	Reserved for (SC/ST/None)	Candidate	Party	Result
1	Dadra and Nagar Haveli	None	Mohanbhai Sanjibhai Delkar	Indian National Congress	Lost

== Daman and Diu ==
INC (1)

Significant friendly fights NCP (1)

Constituency No.	Constituency	Reserved for (SC/ST/None)	Candidate	Party	Result
1	Daman and Diu	None	Dahyabhai Vallabhbhai Patel	Indian National Congress	Lost
1	Daman and Diu	None	Gopal Kalan Tandel	Nationalist Congress Party	Lost

== NCT of Delhi ==
INC (1)

Constituency No.	Constituency	Reserved for (SC/ST/None)	Candidate	Party	Result
1	Chandni Chowk	None	Kapil Sibal	Indian National Congress	Won
2	North East Delhi	None	Jai Prakash Agarwal	Indian National Congress	Won
3	East Delhi	None	Sandeep Dikshit	Indian National Congress	Won
4	New Delhi	None	Ajay Maken	Indian National Congress	Won
5	North West Delhi	SC	Krishna Tirath	Indian National Congress	Won
6	West Delhi	None	Mahabal Mishra	Indian National Congress	Won
7	South Delhi	None	Ramesh Kumar	Indian National Congress	Won

== Lakshadweep ==
INC (1)

Significant friendly fights - NCP (1)

Constituency No.	Constituency	Reserved for (SC/ST/None)	Candidate	Party	Result
1	Lakshadweep	ST	Muhammed Hamdulla Sayeed	Indian National Congress	Won
1	Lakshadweep	ST	P. Pookunhi Koya	Nationalist Congress Party	Lost

== Puducherry ==
INC (1)

Constituency No.	Constituency	Reserved for (SC/ST/None)	Candidate	Party	Result
1	Puducherry	None	V. Narayanasamy	Indian National Congress	Won

== See also ==
List of United Progressive Alliance candidates in the 2009 Indian general election
List of United Progressive Alliance candidates in the 2014 Indian general election
List of United Progressive Alliance candidates in the 2019 Indian general election

- List of National Democratic Alliance candidates in the 2009 Indian general election
- Indian National Congress campaign for the 2009 Indian general election
