= Raju Mukherjee =

Indian cricketer (born 1950)

Personal information
- Full name: Satyabrata Mukherjee
- Born: 23 October 1950 (age 76); Calcutta, West Bengal, India
- Batting: Right-handed
- Role: Batsman
- Relatives: Debabrata Mukherjee (brother)

Domestic team information
- Years: Team
- 1972/73–1981/82: Bengal

Career statistics
Competition	FC	List A
Matches	50	7
Runs scored	2,060	82
Batting average	37.45	11.71
100s/50s	2/14	0/0
Top score	162	29
Balls bowled	38	258
Wickets	2	–
Bowling average	12.50	–
5 wickets in innings	0	–
10 wickets in match	0	n/a
Best bowling	1/4	–
Catches/stumpings	24/–	0/–
- Source: ESPNcricinfo, 15 February 2016

Satyabrata Mukherjee (born 23 October 1950), better known as Raju Mukherjee, is an Indian former cricket player, coach, selector, match referee and writer. He is the author of the book Eden Gardens: Legend and Romance.

== Life and career ==
Mukherjee played as a right-handed batsman, making 50 first-class appearances in which he scored more than 2000 runs at an average of more than 37. He represented Bengal for ten seasons starting from 1972/73 and also captained the team in some matches. He made his first-class debut for East Zone in the 1972–73 Duleep Trophy. He was the captain of the East Zone team that played against the touring Pakistani team in 1980. Mukherjee's final first class appearance came in December 1981 at the age of 31.

A former coach, Mukherjee had previously worked for the Board of Control for Cricket in India as a Talent Resource Development Officer (TRDO) of the Talent Resource Development Wing. Former Bengal captain Prakash Poddar and Mukherjee are regarded as the two TRDOs who first spotted Mahendra Singh Dhoni in 2003.

Mukherjee worked as a match referee from the 2006/07 season to the 2012/13 season, officiating in domestic tournaments including the Indian Premier League. He was appointed as the chairman of the senior team selection committee of the Cricket Association of Bengal in 2014, but stepped down from the post in November 2015. In October 2014, Mukherjee released a book authored by himself called Eden Gardens: Legend and Romance, marking the 150th anniversary of Eden Gardens.

Mukherjee's elder brother Debabrata Mukherjee (Deb Mukherjee) had also played first-class cricket for Bengal as an opening batsman in the 1960s and 1970s.
