= Indian National Congress campaign for the 2009 Indian general election =

- Campaigned for: 2009 Indian general election
- Candidate: Dr.Manmohan Singh
- Affiliation: Indian National Congress
- Headquarters: 24, Akbar Road, New Delhi-110001
- Key people: Sonia Gandhi Rahul Gandhi; Kapil Sibal A.K. Antony
- Slogan: Congress ka hath, Aam Aadmi ke saath Aam aadmi ke badhte kadam, Har kadam par Bharat buland
- Chant: Jai Ho

The Indian National Congress (INC) is one of the two major political parties in India. The prominent members of the party are the president Sonia Gandhi, vice-president Rahul Gandhi, Prime Minister Manmohan Singh. INC took part in the elections alongside other members of the United Progressive Alliance.

== Seat Sharing ==
United Progressive Alliance Seat Sharing for the 2009 Indian General Election
| Sr. No | Party | Status | Seats contested | Seats Won | |
|---|---|---|---|---|---|
| 1. | Indian National Congress | National Party | 440 | 206 | ▲61 |
| 2. | All India Trinamool Congress | State Party (West Bengal) | 27 | 19 | ▲18 |
| 3. | Nationalist Congress Party | National Party | 23 | 9 | ▼1 |
| 4. | Dravida Munnetra Kazhagam | State Party (Tamil Nadu) | 22 | 18 | ▲2 |
| 5. | Jammu & Kashmir National Conference | State Party (Jammu and Kashmir) | 3 | 3 | ▲3 |
| 6. | Indian Union Muslim League | State Party (Kerala) | 2 | 2 | ▲1 |
| 7. | Jharkhand Mukti Morcha | State Party (Jharkhand) | 6 | 2 | ▼3 |
| 8. | Viduthalai Chiruthaigal Katchi | State Party (Tamil Nadu) | 2 | 1 | ▲1 |
| 9. | Bodoland People's Front | State Party (Assam) | 1 | 1 | ▲1 |
| 10. | Kerala Congress (M) | State Party (Kerala) | 1 | 1 | ▲1 |
| 11. | Independents | - | 1 | 1 | |
| 12. | Republican Party of India (Athawale) | State Party (Maharashtra) | 2 | 0 | Steady |
| 13. | Republican Party of India | Unrecognised | 2 | 0 | Steady |
| 14. | Rashtriya Janata Dal | State Party (Bihar) | 28 | 4 | ▼17 |
| | | | 532 | 262 | |

== Results ==
| State | Total Seats | Seats contested | Seats Won | Seat Change |
|---|---|---|---|---|
| Andaman & Nicobar Islands (UT) | 1 | 01 | 0 | ▼1 |
| Andhra Pradesh | 42 | 41 | 33 | ▲3 |
| Arunachal Pradesh | 2 | 02 | 2 | ▲2 |
| Assam | 14 | 14 | 7 | ▼2 |
| Bihar | 40 | 40 | 1 | ▼2 |
| Chandigarh (UT) | 1 | 01 | 1 | Steady |
| Chhattisgarh | 11 | 11 | 1 | Steady |
| Dadra & Nagar Haveli (UT) | 1 | 01 | 0 | Steady |
| Daman & Diu (UT) | 1 | 01 | 0 | Steady |
| Goa | 2 | 02 | 1 | Steady |
| Gujarat | 26 | 26 | 11 | ▼1 |
| Haryana | 10 | 10 | 9 | Steady |
| Himachal Pradesh | 4 | 04 | 1 | Steady |
| Jammu & Kashmir | 6 | 02 | 2 | Steady |
| Jharkhand | 14 | 07 | 1 | ▼5 |
| Karnataka | 28 | 28 | 6 | ▼2 |
| Kerala | 20 | 17 | 13 | ▲13 |
| Lakshadweep (UT) | 1 | 01 | 1 | ▲1 |
| Madhya Pradesh | 29 | 29 | 12 | ▲8 |
| Maharashtra | 48 | 25 | 17 | ▲4 |
| Manipur | 2 | 02 | 2 | ▲1 |
| Meghalaya | 2 | 01 | 1 | ▲1 |
| Mizoram | 1 | 01 | 1 | ▲1 |
| Nagaland | 1 | 01 | 0 | ▼1 |
| NCT of Delhi | 7 | 07 | 7 | ▲1 |
| Orissa | 21 | 21 | 6 | ▲4 |
| Puducherry (UT) | 1 | 01 | 1 | ▲1 |
| Punjab | 13 | 13 | 8 | ▲6 |
| Rajasthan | 25 | 25 | 20 | ▲16 |
| Sikkim | 1 | 01 | 0 | Steady |
| Tamil Nadu | 39 | 15 | 8 | ▲1 |
| Tripura | 2 | 02 | 0 | Steady |
| Uttar Pradesh | 80 | 80 | 21 | ▲12 |
| Uttarakhand | 5 | 05 | 5 | ▲4 |
| West Bengal | 42 | 14 | 6 | ▲1 |
| Total | 543 | 440 | 206 | ▲61 |
