= Debabrata Sharma =

Dr. Devabrata Sharma
- Education: MA, PhD
- Occupations: Retired Principal, Jorhat College
- Known for: Intellectualism, Author
- Spouse: Santana Sharma
- Parent: Dindayal Sharma (Father)

Dr. Debabrata Sharma is an Assamese intellectual, author and Dalit rights activist from Jorhat district of Assam. He is known for his uncompromising opposition to caste oppression in a region where the Dalit movement is feeble. He is also the Secretary of Eklabya Prakashan, a publishing house named after the legendary outsider figure Ekalavya of the Mahabharata.

== Profession ==
By profession he is the Head of the Department of English in Jorhat College Jorhat, Assam.

== Family background ==
He is from a family whose forefathers were martyrs in India's freedom struggle and in the anti-monarchy and caste movement from 1789 to 1806. "I have imbibed that tradition and I don’t believe in caste. I had to purge myself of upper caste feeling, which is not easy in a civil society. I was even shot at by ULFA militants for opposing their theory of de-nationalisation of Assamese people."—said Dr Sharma. He is now working as the chief editor on the Asomiya Jatiya Abhidhan, an ambitious Assamese national dictionary to be released on 1 January 2010.
