= Debabrata Mukherjee (cricketer) =

Indian cricketer (born 1945)

Personal information
- Born: 23 March 1945 (age 81); Cooch Behar, India
- Source: ESPNcricinfo, 6 April 2016

Debabrata Mukherjee (born 23 March 1945) is an Indian former cricketer. He played 26 first-class matches for Bengal between 1963 and 1972.

== See also ==
- List of Bengal cricketers
