= Nagina Lok Sabha constituency =

Lok Sabha constituency in Uttar Pradesh

Coordinates: 29.44°N 78.43°E

Nagina UP-5
- Lok Sabha constituency
- Interactive Map Outlining Nagina Lok Sabha constituency

Constituency details
- Country: India
- Region: North India
- State: Uttar Pradesh
- Assembly constituencies: Najibabad; Nagina; Dhampur; Nehtaur; Noorpur
- Established: 2008
- Total electors: 16,44,909
- Reservation: SC

Member of Parliament
- 18th Lok Sabha
- Incumbent Chandrashekhar Azad; President of the Aazad Samaj Party (Kanshi Ram)
- Party: ASP(KR)
- Elected year: 2024
- Preceded by: Girish Chandra

Nagina Lok Sabha constituency (Hindi pronunciation: [n̪əgiːn̪aː]) is one of the 80 Lok Sabha (parliamentary) constituencies in Uttar Pradesh state in northern India. This constituency came into existence in 2008, as a part of delimitation of parliamentary constituencies based on the recommendations of the Delimitation Commission of India constituted in 2002.

== Assembly segments ==
Presently, Nagina Lok Sabha constituency comprises six Vidhan Sabha (legislative assembly) segments. These are:

No	Name	District	Member	Party	2024 Lead
17	Najibabad	Bijnor	Tasleem Ahmad	SP	ASP(KR)
18	Nagina (SC)	Bijnor	Manoj Kumar Paras	SP	ASP(KR)
20	Dhampur	Bijnor	Ashok Kumar Rana	BJP	ASP(KR)
21	Nehtaur (SC)	Bijnor	Om Kumar	BJP	ASP(KR)
24	Noorpur	Bijnor	Ram Avtar Singh	SP	ASP(KR)

== Members of Parliament ==
Year	Member	Party
2009	Yashvir Singh	Samajwadi Party
2014	Yashwant Singh	Bharatiya Janata Party
2019	Girish Chandra	Bahujan Samaj Party
2024	Chandrashekhar Azad	Aazad Samaj Party

== Election results ==
=== General Elections 2024 ===
Each election in the Nagina Lok Sabha constituency has been won by a different political party (2009–2024).
1. SP (1 term) (25.0%)
2. BJP (1 term) (25.0%)
3. BSP (1 term) (25.0%)
4. ASP (1 term) (25.0%)

2024 Indian general election: Nagina
Party	Candidate	Votes	%	±%
ASP(KR)	Chandrashekhar Azad	512,552	51.19	New
BJP	Om Kumar	361,079	36.06	▼3.72
SP	MANOJ KUMAR	102,374	10.22	▼19.00
BSP	Surendra Pal Singh	13,272	1.33	▼54.98
NOTA	None of the above	5,307	0.53	▼0.12
Majority		151,473	15.13	▼1.40
Turnout		1,001,303	60.87	▼2.79
ASP(KR) gain from BSP		Swing		

=== General Elections 2019 ===
2019 Indian general elections: Nagina
Party	Candidate	Votes	%	±%
BSP	Girish Chandra Jatav	568,378	56.29	▲30.23
BJP	Yashwant Singh	401,546	39.77	▲0.75
INC	Omvati Devi	20,046	1.99	▲1.99
NOTA	None of the Above	6,528	0.65	
Majority		166,832	16.52	
Turnout		1,009,456	63.64	▲0.55
BSP gain from BJP		Swing		

=== General Elections 2014 ===
2014 Indian general elections: Nagina
Party	Candidate	Votes	%	±%
BJP	Yashwant Singh	367,825	39.02	+39.02
SP	Yashvir Singh	275,435	29.22	−7.27
BSP	Girish Chandra	245,685	26.06	−1.16
PECP	Sheeshram Singh Ravi	21,334	2.26	+1.86
MD	Bhagwan Dass Rathor	4,581	0.49	+0.49
NOTA	None of the Above	6,470	0.69	+0.69
Majority		92,390	9.80	+0.53
Turnout		942,625	63.12	+9.35
BJP gain from SP		Swing	+2.53	

=== General Elections 2009 ===
2009 Indian general election: Nagina
Party	Candidate	Votes	%	±%
SP	Yashvir Singh	234,815	36.49	
BSP	Ram Kishan Singh	175,127	27.22	
RLD	Munshi Rampal	163,062	25.34	
INC	Isam Singh	31,779	4.94	
Independent	Ram Chander	11,012	1.71	
Majority		59,688	9.27	
Turnout		643,468	53.78	
SP win (new seat)				

== See also ==
- Bijnor district
- List of constituencies of the Lok Sabha
