= Naim Ul Hasan =

Indian politician

MLA, 17th Legislative Assembly of Uttar Pradesh
- In office June 2018 – March 2022
- Preceded by: Lokendra Singh
- Succeeded by: Ram Avtar Singh
- Constituency: Noorpur

Personal details
- Born: 10 August 1971 (age 55) Seohara, Uttar Pradesh, India
- Party: Samajwadi Party
- Spouse: Tarannum Malik (m. 1999)
- Children: 3
- Education: Jamia Millia Islamia
- Occupation: Ex MLA
- Profession: Agriculturalist, politician

Naim Ul Hasan (born 10 August 1971) is an Indian politician and a member of 17th Legislative Assembly of Uttar Pradesh of India. He represented the Noorpur constituency of Uttar Pradesh and is a member of the Samajwadi Party.

== Personal life ==
Naim Ul Hasan was born on 10 August 1971 in Seohara, Bijnor district, Uttar Pradesh to Mahmud Ul Hasan. He graduated from Jamia Millia Islamia, Delhi. Hasan married Tarannum Malik in 1999, with whom he has two sons and a daughter. Hasan is an agriculturalist by profession.

== Political career ==
He entered politics from student politics. In 2000, he was elected the President of the students union of Jamia Millia Islamia in Delhi. In 2012 assembly elections, the Samajwadi Party had made him their candidate from Noorpur but was later replaced by the party. However, despite this, the Samajwadi Party gave him the gift of a Ministerial position. He is considered close to SP President and former Chief Minister Akhilesh Yadav.

In 2017 assembly elections, again he was given a ticket by Samajwadi Party from Noorpur seat. In that election, Lokendra Chauhan defeated him by more than 12,000 votes, Lokendra Singh Chauhan of BJP got 79,000 votes while Naim Ul Hasan of SP got 66,436 votes.

In May 2018 bypoll elections of Uttar Pradesh, Samajwadi Party president Akhilesh Yadav made a formal announcement of Naimul Hasan's candidature from Noorpur. Local party officials and some Muslim people in the area have also started opposing him after Hasan got the ticket, in Noorpur area people were opposed to giving tickets by blowing an effigy of Hasan. But despite this, Akhilesh Yadav did not change his decision. However, Hasan won and Sahaspur played an important role in Naim ul Hasan this election and he defeated BJP candidate Avani Singh by a margin of 6,000 votes.

In 2022 Assembly election, he contested from Dhampur Assembly constituency as a Samajwadi Party candidate but lost to BJP candidate Ashok Kumar Rana by 203 votes.

== Posts held ==
#	From	To	Position	Comments
01	2018	2022	Member, 17th Legislative Assembly of Uttar Pradesh	in 2022 election he stood from Dhampur legislative assembly but he lost by 218 votes
