= Bahujan Mukti Party =

Political party of India

The Bahujan Mukti Party (BMP) is a political party in India launched on 6 December 2012. Now, Hon'ble Naresh Kumar Nagwanshi is the National President of Bahujan Mukti Party as Hon'ble V L Matang was National President till April 28, 2022 but Pratinidhi Sabha of Bahujan Mukti Party elected Hon'ble Jahar Singh Kashyap as National President in the presence of Shri V L Matang on April 28, 2022. On the same day, Shri Jahar Singh Kashyap was handed over his work by Shri V L Matang. Now Shri Naresh Kumar Nagwanshi is National President of BMP since 2025.

.

== Merger proposal with Loktantrik Janata Dal ==
A merger with Loktantrik Janata Dal (founded on 6 December 2012) was proposed but was called off and was set up as a political wing of All India Backward (SC, ST, OBC) and Minority Communities Employees' Federation (BAMCEF). Dasram Naik is the current president of the Bahujan Mukti party.

== Bihar elections 2020 ==
As of 2020, the party was preparing for the 2020 Bihar Legislative Assembly election for which it formed alliance with former MP Pappu Yadav, Chief of Bhim Army and Azad Samaj Party, Chandrashekhar Azad Ravan to form Progressive Democratic Alliance, but failed to secure any seat.

== Uttar Pradesh election 2022 ==
Considered a smaller party in the 2022 Uttar Pradesh Legislative Assembly election, the Bahujan Mukti Party has fielded its candidates in some areas including the Mahoba and the Auraiya.

== See also ==
- List of political parties in India
