= Girish Chandra (politician) =

Indian politician

Member of Parliament, Lok Sabha
- In office 23 May 2019 – 4 June 2024
- Preceded by: Yashwant Singh
- Succeeded by: Chandrashekhar Azad
- Constituency: Nagina

Personal details
- Born: 15 January 1964 (age 62) Khushalpur, Uttar Pradesh, India
- Party: Bahujan Samaj Party
- Other political affiliations: Mahagathbandhan

Girish Chandra (born 15 January 1964) is an Indian politician who was a former Member of Lok Sabha for Nagina from 2019 till 2024.

== Political career ==
In March 2019, Mahagathbandhan, the grand alliance of Samajwadi Party, Bahujan Samaj Party and Rashtriya Lok Dal announced that Chandra would contest the 2019 Indian general election from Nagina constituency on the symbol of Bahujan Samaj Party. On 23 May 2019, Chandra was elected to the Lok Sabha after defeating Yashwant Singh of Bharatiya Janata Party, his nearest rival by a margin of 1,66,832 votes. Chandra polled 5,68,378 votes.

- He was well known for his attendance in Lok Sabha. He had 93% attendance in parliament as opposed to the national average of 84%. Varta Broadcasting helped him to interact with public

In 2024 Indian general election, the Bahujan Samaj Party announced that Chandra contest the lok sabha election from Bulandshahr Lok Sabha constituency but he was defeated by Bharatiya Janata Party candidate Bhola Singh by a margin of 479,886.4 votes. He finished third and polled 1,17,424 votes.
