= Chandrashekhar Azad (politician) =

Indian politician and social activist (born 1987)

- Official portrait

National President of the Aazad Samaj Party (Kanshi Ram)
- Incumbent
- Assumed office 15 March 2020
- Preceded by: Position Established

Leader of the Aazad Samaj Party (Kanshi Ram) Lok Sabha
- Incumbent
- Assumed office 4 June 2024
- Preceded by: Position Established

Chief of the Bhim Army
- Incumbent
- Assumed office 21 July 2015
- Preceded by: Position Established

Member of Parliament, Lok Sabha
- Incumbent
- Assumed office 4 June 2024
- Preceded by: Girish Chandra
- Constituency: Nagina, Bijnor Uttar Pradesh
- Majority: 1,51,473

Personal details
- Born: 5 December 1987 (age 38) Chhutmalpur, Uttar Pradesh, India
- Party: Aazad Samaj Party (Kanshi Ram)
- Spouse: Vandna Azad (m. 2020)
- Children: 1
- Parent(s): Govardhan Das (father); Kamlesh Devi (mother)
- Education: B.A. Hons. & L.L.B.
- Alma mater: Hemwati Nandan Bahuguna Garhwal University
- Occupation: Politician, lawyer, social activist

Chandrashekhar Azad (born 5 December 1987; Hindi pronunciation: [t͡ʃən̪d̪ɾəʃeːkʰəɾ aːzaːd̪]), also known as Chandrashekhar and Chandrashekhar Azad "Ravan", is an Indian politician, social activist, Ambedkarite and lawyer. He is serving as a Member of Parliament of the 18th Lok Sabha from Nagina since June 2024. He is the chief and co-founder of the Bhim Army, and the National President of the Aazad Samaj Party (Kanshi Ram). In February 2021, Time magazine featured him in its annual list of 100 Emerging Leaders who are Shaping the Future.

== Early life ==
Chandrashekhar Azad was born on 5 December 1987, village Chhutmalpur in Saharanpur, Western Uttar Pradesh. Growing up in a Dalit family, Azad experienced caste-based discrimination, which influenced his early interest in social justice and advocacy. His father, Govardhan Das, retired as a principal of a government school. Azad came to prominence as a Bahujan leader after he installed a hoarding titled The Great Chamars of Ghadkhauli Welcome You on the outskirts of his village. Chandra Shekhar Azad started free coaching classes for all categories and distributed free books for poor students to study.

== Activism ==
Azad, Satish Kumar, and Vinay Ratan Singh founded Bhim Army in 2014, an organisation that works for the emancipation of Dalits through education in India. It runs free schools for Dalits in western Uttar Pradesh.

Led by Chandrashekhar Azad, Bhim Army was active in the protest to repeal the controversial Citizen Amendment Act in 2019.

He also joined the CJP-led Sansaad Chalo March at Jantar Mantar in 2026. Alongside students and Indian youth, he protested the NEET paper leaks, demanded the resignation of Union Education Minister Dharmendhra Pradhan, and strongly opposed the violence inflicted on students by the police on 20th July 2026.

== Politics ==
In 2020, Azad founded the Aazad Samaj Party (Kanshi Ram).

5656 UP legislative Assembly elections, he contested the Gorakhpur Urban Assembly constituency against Yogi Adityanath, with Azad getting 3.06% of the vote share.

In the 2024 Indian general election in Uttar Pradesh, Aazad Samaj Party (ASP) candidate Chandrashekhar Azad won the Nagina Lok Sabha constituency by 1,51,473 votes. He got 5,12,552 votes. BJP's Om Kumar came second, who got 3,61,079 votes.

=== Posts held ===
#	From	To	Position	Party
1	4 June 2024	Incumbent	Member of Parliament, 18th Lok Sabha	ASP
2	14 August 2024	Incumbent	Member of the Committee on the Welfare of Scheduled Castes and Scheduled Tribes	ASP
3	26 September 2024	Incumbent	Member of the Standing Committee on Home Affairs	ASP
4	15 March 2020	Incumbent	National President of the Aazad Samaj Party (Kanshi Ram)	ASP

== Imprisonment ==
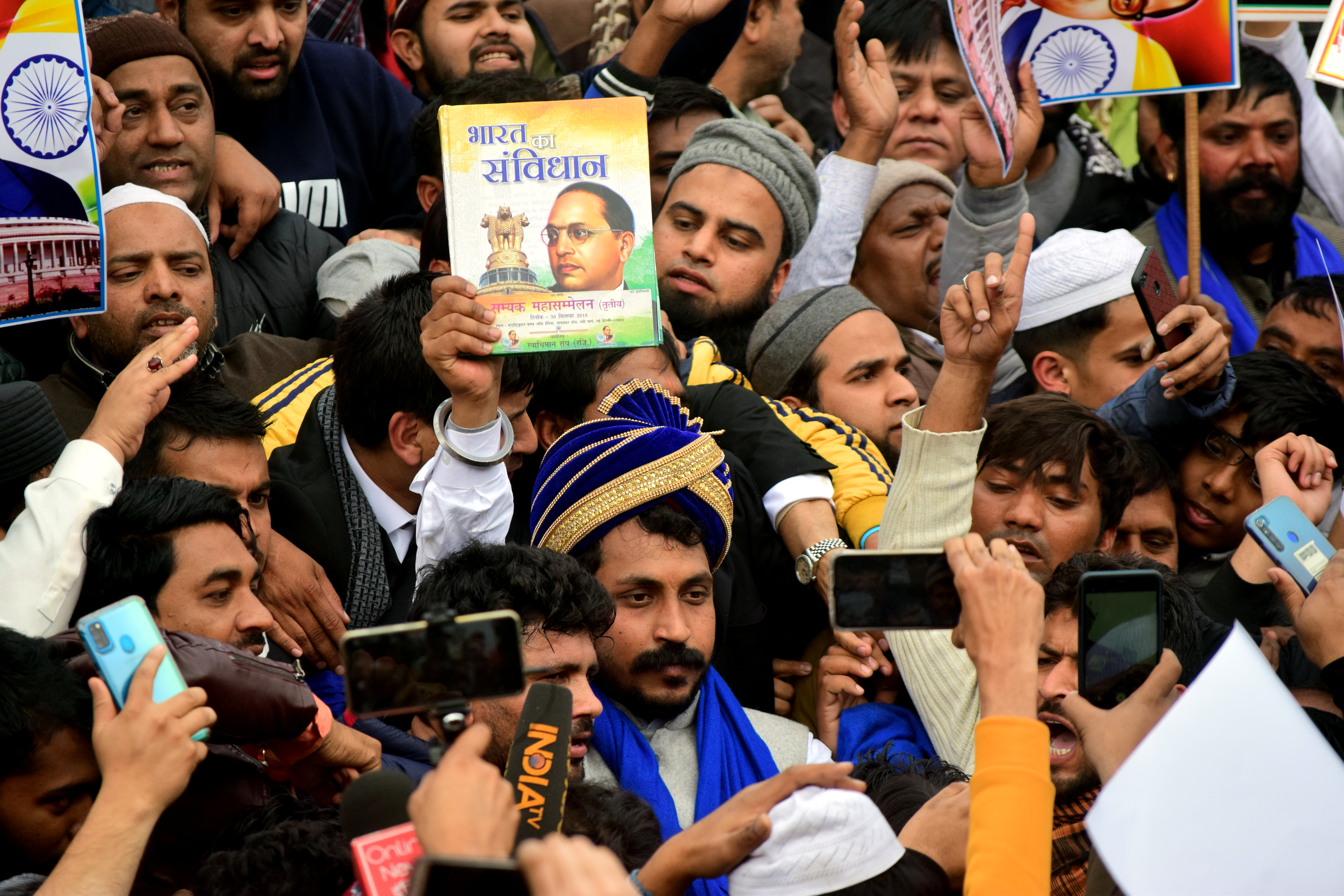
Chandrashekhar Azad at Jama Masjid, Delhi, during the anti CAA protests.

- He was arrested in relation to the Saharanpur violence incident. Azad was arrested under the National Security Act by the Uttar Pradesh Government. Afterwards he was granted bail by the Allahabad High Court after his lawyer argued that the arrests were politically motivated.
- Delhi Police had denied permission to Chandrashekhar Azad's protest march against the Citizenship (Amendment) Act from Delhi Jama Masjid to Jantar Mantar. He entered into protest at Jama Masjid and was arrested by Delhi police and detained for several days.

== Election history ==
=== Lok Sabha ===
Year	Constituency	Party	Votes	Opponent	Opponent party	Opponent votes	Result	Margin
2024	Nagina	ASP(KR)	5,12,552 (51.19%)	Om Kumar	BJP	3,61,079 (36.06%)	Won	1,51,473

=== Member of Legislative Assembly (Uttar Pradesh) ===
Year	Constituency	Party	Votes	Opponent	Opponent party	Opponent votes	Result	Margin
2022	Gorakhpur Urban	ASP(KR)	7,640 (3.06%)	Yogi Adityanath	BJP	1,65,499 (66.18%)	Lost	1,57,859

== See also ==
- Third Mayawati ministry
- Jignesh Mevani
- Shri Guru Ravidas Gurughar, Tughlakaba
- Mayawati
- Fourth Mayawati ministry
- Kanshi Ram
- Bahujan Samaj Party
- Ravidassia
