= Bulandshahr Lok Sabha constituency =

Lok Sabha Constituency in Uttar Pradesh, India

Coordinates: 28.4°N 77.85°E

Bulandshahr UP-13
- Lok Sabha constituency
- Interactive Map Outlining Bulandshahr Lok Sabha constituency

Constituency details
- Country: India
- Region: North India
- State: Uttar Pradesh
- Assembly constituencies: Bulandshahr; Syana; Anupshahr; Debai; Shikarpur
- Established: 1952
- Total electors: 18,59,636
- Reservation: SC

Member of Parliament
- 18th Lok Sabha
- Incumbent Bhola Singh
- Party: Bharatiya Janata Party
- Elected year: 2024

Bulandshahr Lok Sabha constituency (Hindi pronunciation: [bʊlən̪d̪.ʃɛɦɛɾ]) is one of the 80 Lok Sabha (parliamentary) constituencies in Uttar Pradesh state in India.

== Assembly segments ==
After delimitation (2008), this Lok Sabha constituency comprises the following five Vidhan Sabha segments:

No	Name	District	Member	Party	2024 Lead
65	Bulandshahr	Bulandshahr	Pradeep Chaudhary	BJP	BJP
66	Syana	Bulandshahr	Devendra Lodhi	BJP	BJP
67	Anupshahr	Bulandshahr	Sanjay Kumar Sharma	BJP	BJP
68	Debai	Bulandshahr	Chandrapal Singh	BJP	BJP
69	Shikarpur	Bulandshahr	Anil Sharma	BJP	BJP

== Members of Parliament ==
In the 1st and 2nd Lok Sabha, Bulandshahr constituency had 2 Member of Parliament (MP). Since 1962, it has only 1 MP.

Year	Member	Party
1952	Raghubar Dayal Misra; Kanhaiya Lal Balmiki	Indian National Congress
1957	Raghubar Dayal Misra; Kanhaiya Lal Balmiki	Indian National Congress
1962	Surendra Pal Singh	Indian National Congress
1967	Surendra Pal Singh	Indian National Congress
1971	Surendra Pal Singh	Indian National Congress
1977	Mahmood Hasan Khan	Janata Party
1980	Mahmood Hasan Khan	Janata Party (Secular)
1984	Surendra Pal Singh	Indian National Congress
1989	Sarwar Hussain	Janata Dal
1991	Chhatrapal Singh Lodha	Bharatiya Janata Party
1996	Chhatrapal Singh Lodha	Bharatiya Janata Party
1998	Chhatrapal Singh Lodha	Bharatiya Janata Party
1999	Chhatrapal Singh Lodha	Bharatiya Janata Party
2004	Kalyan Singh	Bharatiya Janata Party
2009	Kamlesh Balmiki	Samajwadi Party
2014	Bhola Singh	Bharatiya Janata Party
2019	Bhola Singh	Bharatiya Janata Party
2024	Bhola Singh	Bharatiya Janata Party

== Election results ==
=== General Election 2024 ===
2024 Indian general election: Bulandshahr
Party	Candidate	Votes	%	±%
BJP	Bhola Singh	597,310	56.65	▼3.99
INC	Shivram Valmiki	3,22,176	30.56	▲27.94
BSP	Girish Chandra	1,17,424	11.14	▼23.68
NOTA	None of the above	6,925	0.66	▲0.15
Majority		2,75,134	26.09	▲0.28
Turnout		10,54,399	56.70	▼6.22
BJP hold		Swing		

=== 2019 ===
2019 Indian general elections: Bulandshahr
Party	Candidate	Votes	%	±%
BJP	Bhola Singh	681,321	60.64	+0.81
BSP	Yogesh Verma	3,91,264	34.82	+16.76
INC	Banshi Singh	29,465	2.62	−3.23
NOTA	None of the above	5,719	0.51	−0.17
Margin of victory		2,90,057	25.81	−15.96
Turnout		11,25,000	62.92	+4.74
BJP hold		Swing		

=== 2014 ===
2014 Indian general elections: Bulandshahr
Party	Candidate	Votes	%	±%
BJP	Bhola Singh	604,449	59.83	+34.37
BSP	Pradeep Kumar Jatav	1,82,476	18.06	−3.21
SP	Kamlesh Balmiki	1,28,737	12.74	−22.60
RLD	Anju (Muskan Ali)	59,116	5.85	−9.12
AAP	Dr. Rahul Dipankar	9,727	0.96	New
NOTA	Non of the Above	6,915	0.68	New
Margin of victory		4,21,973	41.77	+31.89
Turnout		10,10,198	58.18	+13.10
BJP gain from SP		Swing	+24.49	

== See also ==
- Bulandshahr district
