= Behra Sandal Singh =

Village in Uttar Pradesh, India

Coordinates: 30.058°N 77.677°E

- Village
- Interactive map of Behra Sandal Singh
- Country: India
- State: Uttar Pradesh
- District: Saharanpur
- Approximate age: ~400 years ago

Population (2015)
  - Total: 15,000

Behra Sandal Singh is a village in Saharanpur district, Uttar Pradesh province, India. It is about 400 years old. The majority of the inhabitants are the Rajputs and Muslims and but diverse castes and ethnic groups live in the village.

== Origin of the name ==
Behra Sandal Singh reputedly got its name from an early inhabitant, Sandal Singh, who is said to have been a generous man who never turned anyone away from his home empty-handed. He is said to have fed a whole baraat (group of people who came for a wedding), and the village was named in his honor.

== Geography ==
Behra Sandal Singh is about 7 km from Chhutmalpur.

== Education and demographics ==
There are several educational institutions in Behra Sandal Singh, offering instruction in both Hindi and English.

The population, as of 2015, is over 15,000 people.
