= Aazad Samaj Party (Kanshi Ram) =

Indian political party

Aazad Samaj Party (Kanshi Ram) आजाद समाज पार्टी (कांशीराम)
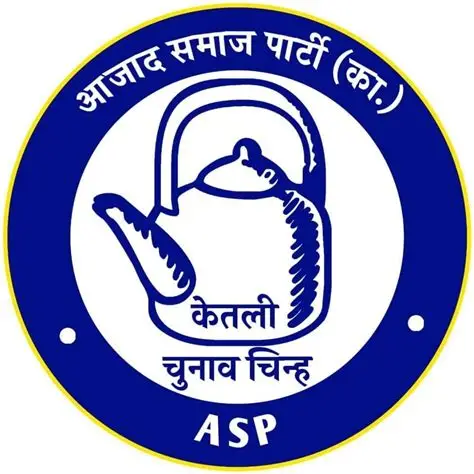
- Abbreviation: ASP(KR)
- Leader: Chandrashekhar Azad
- President: Chandrashekhar Azad
- General Secretary: Ravindra Bhati Gurjar
- Parliamentary Chairperson: Chandrashekhar Azad
- Lok Sabha Leader: Chandrashekhar Azad
- Treasurer: Virendra Kumar Shirish
- Founder: Chandrashekhar Azad; Vinay Ratan Singh
- Founded: 15 March 2020; 6 years ago
- Headquarters: 3/22-c-136, C Block Gokulpur New Delhi, 110094
- Student wing: Bhim Army Student Federation of India
- Youth wing: Bhim Army
- Ideology: Ambedkarism; Socialism (Indian); Dalit rights Secularism
- Political position: Centre-left
- Colours: Blue; White
- ECI status: Registered Unrecognised party
- Seats in Rajya Sabha: 0 / 245
- Seats in Lok Sabha: 1 / 543
- Seats in Uttar Pradesh Legislative Assembly: 0 / 403
- Seats in Uttar Pradesh Legislative Council: 0 / 100

Election symbol
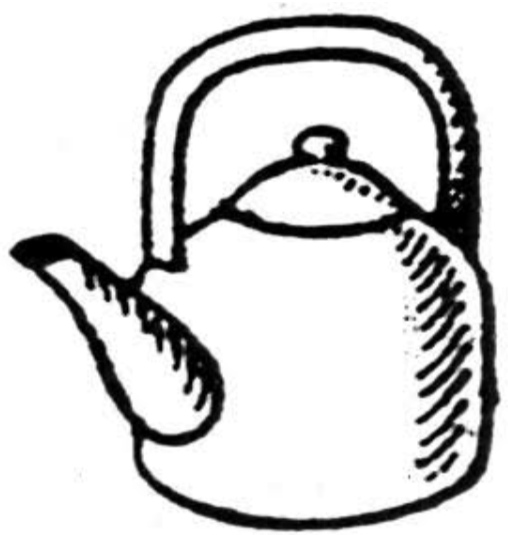

Party flag
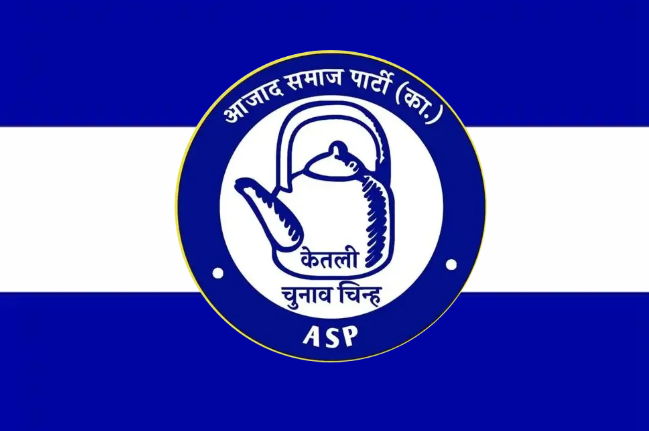

Website
- aazadsamajpartyk.org

Aazad Samaj Party (Kanshi Ram) (abbr. ASP(KR)) is an Indian registered, unrecognized political party in the state of Uttar Pradesh. It was founded by Chandrashekhar Azad.

== History ==
=== Precursor ===
The Azad Samaj Party's origins lie in the Bhim Army founded by Chandra Shekhar Aazad in 2015 to protect constitutional rights and oppose caste oppression. The group formed after reports of discrimination and caste-based violence faced by Dalit students at AHP Inter-college in Uttar Pradesh, and the Bhim Army then helped protect the Dalit students.

Azad gained attention after publicly posting a sign which read "The Great Chamar of Dhadkauli Welcome You." Upper-caste Rajputs were upset with the Dalit celebration of identity and objected to the erection of the board. But, the Bhim Army intervened and ensure that the Dalits did not unleash any violence. In another incident, the Rajputs prevented a Dalit groom from riding a horse to his wedding. Yet again, the Bhim Army intervened and escorted the groom.

The Bhim Army attained national prominence after clashes in Uttar Pradesh. In June 2017, the group's leader Chandrashekhar, a lawyer, was arrested by the Uttar Pradesh Special Task Force. Chandrashekhar was granted bail by the Allahabad High Court in November 2017, but the Uttar Pradesh government led by Yogi Adityanath continued to detain him under the National Security Act until it dropped the NSA order in September 2018 and acquitted Chandrashekhar from jail. Chandrashekhar describes himself as a representative of Bahujan identity and a follower of Kanshi Ram.

The group protests against discrimination and caste violence against Dalit by members of the upper Thakurs caste in violent clashes in 2017 in Saharanpur. Bhim Army rally in Jantar Mantar, New Delhi in 2017 was attended by a large crowd, estimated to be 10,000 by Delhi Police.

In August 2019, the Bhim Army took part in nationwide Dalit protests against the demolition of Shri Guru Ravidas Gurughar, a temple dedicated to Sant Ravidas in Tughlaqabad, Delhi, on the orders of the Delhi Development Authority (DDA), following lengthy litigation between the DDA and Guru Ravidas Jainti Samaroh Samiti. Dozens of people, including Chandrashekhar and Vinay Ratan, were arrested by police, prompting the Bhim Army to demand their release.

In March 2020, Chandrashekhar announced that the Bhim Army would formally enter electoral politics. The group previously operated as a quasi-political force. Chandrashekhar stated that "We tried to join hands and work unitedly with the Bahujan Samaj Party but its leader was unwilling to do so." Chandrashekhar said the new political party would set up an office in Lucknow and work to counter the ruling BJP. Chandrashekhar has described the BJP as his chief political adversary, but has also competed with Mayawati, the leader of the Bahujan Samaj Party.

The Bhim Army opposes the BJP's Citizenship (Amendment) Act, 2019 (CAA) legislation In January and February 2020, the Bhim Army engaged in the protests against the CAA and sought its repeal. In February 2020, street clashes took place between pro-CAA BJP supporters and Bhim Army supporters in connection with the North East Delhi riots; both sides engaged in stone-pelting.

=== Current political organization ===
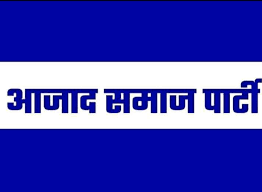
Azad samaj party logo

On 15 March 2020, Chandrashekhar officially announced his new political party named Azad Samaj Party. As many as 78 former leaders of the Samajwadi Party, Bahujan Samaj Party and Indian National Congress joined the newly launched party. Chandra Shekhar Aazad officially announced the formation of his new political party, named Azad Samaj Party, on 15 March 2020. A total of 98 former leaders from the Samajwadi Party, Bhartiya Janta Party, Indian National Congress, and Rashtriya Lok Dal joined the newly launched party.

On 27 October, the Azad Samaj Party formed an alliance with the Rashtriya Loktantrik Party for the 2023 Rajasthan Assembly elections.

The party's leader Chandrashekar Azad is the party's first Member of Parliament and is elected from nagina lok sabha constituency.

== List of party leaders ==
=== Presidents ===
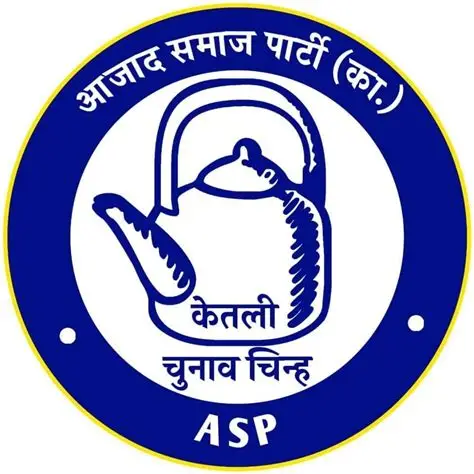
| No. | Portrait | Name (Birth–Death) | Term in office | | |
| No. | Portrait | Name (Birth–Death) | Assumed office | Left office | Time in office |
National President of the Aazad Samaj Party (Kanshi Ram)
| 1 | | Chandra Shekhar Azad (b. 1986) | 14 March 2020 | Incumbent | 6 years, 245 days |
National General Secretary of the Aazad Samaj Party (Kanshi Ram)
| 2 | | Ravinder Bhati Gurjar | 16 June 2023 | Incumbent | 3 years, 151 days |
National Treasurer of the Aazad Samaj Party (Kanshi Ram)
| 3 | | Virendra Kumar Shirish | 16 June 2023 | Incumbent | 3 years, 151 days |
National President of the Bhim Army & Youth wing Aazad Samaj Party (Kanshi Ram)
| 3 | | Vinay Ratan Singh | 21 July 2015 | Incumbent | 11 years, 116 days |

=== National Core Committee ===
The National Core Committee is a central organizational body of the Azad Samaj Party (Kanshi Ram), which oversees important organizational and political activities of the Party.

| S.No | Member |
|---|---|
| 1. | Nijam Choudhary |
| 2. | Mohammad Aqib |
| 3. | Sanjay Harit |
| 4. | Amit Kasana |
| 5. | Gulzar Siddiqui |
| 6. | Satpal Chaudhary |
| 7. | Himanshu Valmiki |
| 8. | Damodar Singh Yadav |

== State Leadership ==
The Aazad Samaj Party (Kanshi Ram) has state units in Bihar, Chandigarh, Chhattisgarh, Delhi, Madhya Pradesh, Maharashtra, Manipur, Punjab, Rajasthan, Uttar Pradesh, Uttarakhand West Bengal and other states.

| State | State President | General Secretary | Vice President |
|---|---|---|---|
| Bihar | Jauhar Azad | Sanjay Kumar Rajak | |
| Delhi | Balak Ram Bauddh | | |
| Haryana | Rame Pradhan | | |
| Jharkhand | Kashif Raza | | Asif Siddiqui |
| Madhya Pradesh | Er. Satyendra Vidrohi | Adv. Ray Singh Baudh; Rampreet Kansana | Keshav Singh Yadav |
| Maharashtra | Anand Londhe | Zubair Memon | |
| Rajasthan | Anil Kumar Dhenwal | Sunil Bhartiya; Deepak Saini | Surendra Singh Bhartiya |
| Uttar Pradesh | Sunil Kumar Chittod (Ex-MLC) | Dr. Mohammad Aqib | Saurabh Kishor |
| Uttarakhand | Lekhraj Gautam | | |
| Gujarat | Kamlesh Dhaval | | |

== Electoral performance ==
Lok sabha election results
| Year | Legislature | Party leader | Pre-poll alliance | Seats contested | Seats won | Change in seats | Total votes | Overall vote % | Vote swing | Outcome | Ref. |
|---|---|---|---|---|---|---|---|---|---|---|---|
| 2024 | 18th Lok Sabha | Chandrashekhar Azad | Steady | 26 | 1 / 543 | ▲1 | 6,91,820 | 0.1% | New | Opposition | |

State assembly election results
| Year | Party leader | Pre-poll alliance | Seats contested | Seats won | Change in seats | Total votes | Overall vote % | Vote swing | Outcome |
Bihar
| 2025 | | GDA | 18 | 0 / 243 | Steady | 96,796 | 0.2% | ▲ | Steady |
Delhi
| 2025 | | Steady | 14 | 0 / 70 | Steady | 8,727 | 0.1% | new | Steady |
Jammu and Kashmir
| 2024 | | Steady | 5 | 0 / 90 | Steady | 3,075 | 0.1% | new | Steady |
Jharkhand
| 2024 | | Steady | 17 | 0 / 81 | Steady | 72,873 | 0.4% | new | Steady |
Haryana
| 2024 | | JJP+ | 12 | 0 / 90 | Steady | 19,534 | 0.1% | new | Steady |
Madhya Pradesh
| 2023 | | Steady | 86 | 0 / 230 | Steady | 142,421 | 0.3% | new | Steady |
Maharashtra
| 2024 | | Steady | 28 | 0 / 288 | Steady | 73,265 | 0.1% | new | Steady |
Punjab
| 2022 | | Steady | 8 | 0 / 117 | Steady | 3,478 | 0% | new | Steady |
Rajasthan
| 2023 | | RLP+ | 47 | 0 / 200 | Steady | 3,53,437 | 0.9% | new | Steady |
Telangana
| 2023 | | Steady | 4 | 0 / 119 | Steady | 1,002 | 0% | new | Steady |
Uttarakhand
| 2022 | | Steady | 13 | 0 / 70 | Steady | 34,109 | 0.6% | new | Steady |
Uttar Pradesh
| 2022 | Chandrashekhar Azad | Steady | 111 | 0 / 403 | Steady | 1,19,564 | 0.1% | new | Steady |
Bihar
| 2020 | | Steady | 4 | 0 / 243 | Steady | 4,552 | 0% | new | Steady |

== List of MPs ==
=== Members of Parliament, Lok Sabha ===
| S.No | Election Year | Portrait | MP | Constituency | Lok Sabha | Margin |
|---|---|---|---|---|---|---|
| 1. | 2024 | | Chandrashekhar Azad | Nagina | 18th Lok Sabha | 1,51,473 |

== Prominent members ==
- Chandra Shekhar Azad - Founder and National President of the Azad Samaj Party. MP from Nagina.
- Vinay Ratan Singh - Co-founder of the Azad Samaj Party and National President of the Bhim Army.
- Kamal Singh Wallia - Chief National General Secretary of the Bhim Army Bharat Ekta Mission.
- Ravinder Bhati Gurjar - National General Secretary of the Azad Samaj Party.
- Gulzar Siddiqui - National Core Committee member and founding member of the Azad Samaj Party.
- Sunil Kumar Chittod - State President of the Azad Samaj Party, U.P. and Ex-MLC from Uttar Pradesh.
- Damodar Singh Yadav - National Core Committee member of the Azad Samaj Party and former MLA candidate from Sewda & Datia Assembly constituency.
- Himanshu Valmiki - National Core Committee member of the Azad Samaj Party. State President Bhim Army, Delhi.

== See also ==
- List of political parties in India
- Bahujan Samaj Party
- Samajwadi Party
- Fourth Mayawati ministry
- Kanshi Ram
- List of Jatav
