= Gyan Chand Jain =

Indian writer and scholar (1923–2007)

- Born: 1923; Seohara, Bijnore district, India
- Died: August 2007 (aged 83–84); Porterville, California
- Occupations: Urdu scholar, writer
- Known for: Urdu

Gyan Chand Jain (1923 – 2007) was an Indian writer and scholar of Urdu literature. Born in 1923 at Seohara of Bijnore district in the Indian state of Uttar Pradesh, Jain was known for his scholarship on Ghalib literature. He authored several books including Aik Bhasha: Do Likhawat, Do Adab and Urdu Ki Nasri Dastanain, the latter considered by many as his masterpiece.

Jain received the Sahitya Akademi Award for Urdu in 1982. He died, aged 85, in August 2007 at Porterville, California.

== See also ==
- Urdu literature
