= Surendra Pal Singh =

Indian politician

Raja Surendra Pal Singh
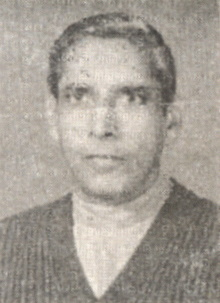

Member of Parliament in Lok Sabha
- In office 1962–1977
- Preceded by: R.D. Misra and K.L. Balmiki
- Succeeded by: Mahmood Hasan Khan
- In office 1984–1989
- Preceded by: Mahmood Hasan Khan
- Succeeded by: Sarwar Hussain
- Constituency: Bulandshahr

Personal details
- Born: 17 May 1917 Bahanpur, Bulandshahr district, United Provinces of Agra and Oudh, British India (now in Uttar Pradesh, India)
- Died: 10 December 2009 (aged 92) Bulandshahr District, Uttar Pradesh, India
- Party: Indian National Congress

Surendra Pal Singh(17 May 1917 – 10 December 2009) was an Indian politician who served as Member of Parliament in the Lok Sabha. He was elected to the 3rd, 4th, 5th, and 8th Lok Sabha from Uttar Pradesh. He was a member of the Indian National Congress.

== Early life and education ==
In 1927, at the age of 10-years, he inherited The Fort at Unchagaon, Bulandshahr, Uttar Pradesh. He was educated at Colonel Brown Cambridge School and completed his Bachelor of Arts from 1936 to 1939 at Peterhouse, a constituent college of University of Cambridge.

== Political career ==
He was a member of the 3rd Lok Sabha from Bulandshahr (Lok Sabha constituency) in Uttar Pradesh State, India. He was elected to 4th, 5th and 8th Lok Sabha from Bulandshahr.

== Death ==
He died in Bulandshahr on 10 December 2009, at the age of 92 years.
