= Dhampur Assembly constituency =

Constituency of the Uttar Pradesh legislative assembly in India

Dhampur
- Constituency No. 20 for the Uttar Pradesh Legislative Assembly

Constituency details
- Country: India
- Region: North India
- State: Uttar Pradesh
- District: Bijnor
- Lok Sabha constituency: Nagina
- Total electors: 252,629 (2012)
- Reservation: None

Member of Legislative Assembly
- 18th Uttar Pradesh Legislative Assembly
- Incumbent Ashok Kumar Rana
- Party: Bharatiya Janata Party
- Elected year: 2022

Dhampur Assembly constituency is one of the 403 constituencies of the Uttar Pradesh Legislative Assembly, India. It is a part of the Bijnor district and one of the five assembly constituencies in the Nagina Lok Sabha constituency. First election in this assembly constituency was held in 1957 after the delimitation order (DPACO – 1956) was passed in 1956. The constituency was assigned identification number 20 after "Delimitation of Parliamentary and Assembly Constituencies Order, 2008" was passed in the year 2008.

== Wards and areas ==
Extent of Dhampur Assembly constituency is KC Sherkot, PCs Ajitpurdasi, Berkhera Tanda, Chak Mohmad Nagar, Jamapur, Jasmor, Manpur Shivpuri, Mitthepur, Moh. Alipur Madho, Mukerpuri, Palanpur, Rasoolpur Mohd. Kuli, Sabdalpur, Saddober, Safiyabad, Salarabad, Seohara of Seohara KC, PCs Amkhera Shanjarpur, Bamnoli, Chakrajmal, Dhampur Husainpur, Fatehullapur Khas, Mauzampur Jaitra, Mohri, Mozampur Suraj, Nindru of Dhampur KC, Dhampur MB, Sherkot MB & Seohara MB of Dhampur Tehsil.

== Members of the Legislative Assembly ==
Year	Member	Party
1957	Girdhari Lal	Indian National Congress
1957	Khub Singh	Indian National Congress
1962	Khub Singh	Indian National Congress
1967	Govind Sahai	Indian National Congress
1969	Sattar Ahmad	Bharatiya Kranti Dal
1974	Sattar Ahmad	Indian National Congress
1977	Haripal Singh Shastri	Janata Party
1980	Shiam Singh	Janata Party (Secular)
1985	Basant Singh	Indian National Congress
1989	Surendra Singh	Bharatiya Janata Party
1991	Rajendra Singh	Bharatiya Janata Party
1993	Rajendra Singh	Bharatiya Janata Party
1996	Mool Chand Chauhan	Samajwadi Party
2002	Mool Chand Chauhan	Samajwadi Party
2007	Ashok Kumar Rana	Bahujan Samaj Party
2012	Mool Chand Chauhan	Samajwadi Party
2017	Ashok Kumar Rana	Bharatiya Janata Party
2022	Ashok Kumar Rana	Bharatiya Janata Party

== Election results ==
=== 2027 ===
2027 Uttar Pradesh Legislative Assembly election: Dhampur
Party	Candidate	Votes	%	±%
INDIA				
NDA				
BSP				
NOTA	None of the above			
Majority				
Turnout				
gain from		Swing		

=== 2022 ===
2022 Uttar Pradesh Legislative Assembly election: Dhampur
Party	Candidate	Votes	%	±%
BJP	Ashok Kumar Rana	81,791	39.89	−2.69
SP	Naim Ul Hasan	81,588	39.79	+6.46
BSP	Mool Chand Chauhan	38,993	19.01	−3.19
NOTA	None of the above	834	0.41	−0.12
Majority		203	0.1	−9.15
Turnout		205,067	67.82	−0.54
BJP hold		Swing		

=== 2017 ===
2017 Uttar Pradesh Legislative Assembly election: Dhampur
Party	Candidate	Votes	%	±%
BJP	Ashok Kumar Rana	82,169	42.58	
SP	Mool Chand Chauhan	64,305	33.33	
BSP	Mohammad Ghazi	42,836	22.2	
NOTA	None of the above	1,020	0.53	
Majority		17,864	9.25	
Turnout		192,961	68.36	
BJP gain from SP		Swing		

=== 2012 ===
16th Vidhan Sabha: 2012 General Elections

2012 General Elections: Dhampur
Party	Candidate	Votes	%	±%
SP	Mool Chand Chauhan	53,365	33.12	–
BSP	Ashok Kumar Rana	52,801	32.77	–
INC	Anwar Jamil	36,995	22.96	–
	Remainder 15 candidates	17,963	11.15	–
Majority		564	0.35	–
Turnout		161,124	63.78	–
SP gain from BSP		Swing		

== See also ==
- Bijnor district
- Sahaspur
- Government of Uttar Pradesh
- List of Vidhan Sabha constituencies of Uttar Pradesh
- Nagina Lok Sabha constituency
- Sixteenth Legislative Assembly of Uttar Pradesh
- Uttar Pradesh Legislative Assembly
- Uttar Pradesh
