= Lokendra Singh (politician) =

Uttar Pradesh Legislative Assembly

Thakur Lokendra Singh
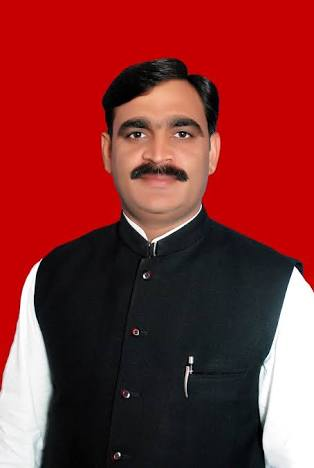

MLA, 17th Legislative Assembly
- In office March 2017 – February 2018
- Succeeded by: Naim Ul Hasan
- Constituency: Noorpur

MLA, 16th Legislative Assembly
- In office March 2012 – March 2017
- Preceded by: Constituency Created
- Succeeded by: Self
- Constituency: Noorpur

Personal details
- Born: 15 December 1976 Sahaspur, Uttar Pradesh
- Died: 21 February 2018 (aged 41) Sitapur
- Party: Bharatiya Janata Party
- Education: Bareilly College (M. J. P. Rohilkhand University)
- Profession: Agriculturist & Politician
- Portfolio: MLA
- Website: www.lokendrasingh.in

Lokendra Singh (15 December 1976 – 21 February 2018) was an Indian politician and a member of the 16th Legislative Assembly of Uttar Pradesh of India. He born in Sahaspur and represented the Noorpur constituency of Uttar Pradesh and was a member of the Bharatiya Janata Party political party.

== Early life and education ==
Lokendra Singh was born in Sahaspur, Uttar Pradesh. He held Master of Arts degree from Bareilly College (M. J. P. Rohilkhand University). Before being elected as MLA, he used to work as an agriculturist.

== Controversy ==
On 12 August 2017, a case was filed against Singh, his brother, and a former Samajwadi Party MLA for allegedly illegally detaining a farmer who died after being tortured.

== Death ==
Singh died on 21 February 2018 in a traffic collision at the age of 41.

== Posts held ==
| # | From | To | Position | Comments |
|---|---|---|---|---|
| 01 | March 2012 | March 2017 | Member, 16th Legislative Assembly | |
| 02 | March 2017 | February 2018 | Member, 17th Legislative Assembly | died during his term |

== See also ==
- Bharatiya Janata Party
- Government of India
- Noorpur
- Politics of India
- Sahaspur
- Sahaspur
- Uttar Pradesh Legislative Assembly
