= Raghubar Dayal Misra =

Indian politician

Member of Parliament in Lok Sabha
- In office 1952–1962
- Preceded by: constituency created
- Succeeded by: Surendra Pal Singh
- Constituency: Bulandshahr

Personal details
- Born: 14 September 1898
- Party: Indian National Congress
- Spouse: Chameli Devi

Raghubar Dayal Misra born 14 September 1898, in Sikandrabad, was an Indian politician and legal practitioner. Son of Pandit Har Dayal Singh Sharma, he was educated at C. M. School, Firozabad, A. V. High School, Sikandrabad, Government High School, Bulandshahr and Hathras, and Maharaja's College, Jaipur. He married Shrimati Chameli Devi in 1917 and had two sons and two daughters.He served as Municipal Commissioner of the Municipal Board, Sikandrabad (1926–29, 1932–45) and was its Honorary Secretary. He was a member of the Indian National Congress from 1921 to 1948, later joining the Socialist Party in April 1948 before rejoining Congress in July 1950. He served as President of the Bulandshahr D.C.C. (1924–26, 1929–31, 1938) and again since October 1950. He was imprisoned several times for political activities and was a Member of the First Lok Sabha (1952–57).

He and K.L. Balmiki were the 1st Lok Sabha MP from Bulandshahr.
