= Fort Unchagaon =

Fort in Uttar Pradesh

Coordinates: 28.487902°N 78.152222°E

Fort Unchagaon is a fort 110 km from Delhi in the village of Unchagaon, west of Bulandshahr district, India. British authorities in India gifted it to Gursahai Singh as a reward for his loyalty during the Indian Rebellion of 1857, and it was later inherited by his grand nephew Surendra Pal Singh at the age of ten-years.

== History ==
The Unchagaon site was first fortified by the Baachal branch of the Sisodiya Gehlot Rajputs under Rao Gopal Singh circa the early 17th century, establishing Unchagaon as a strategic village on the banks of the Ganges. Following the 1857 Rebellion, the British rewarded Gursahai Singh of Moradabad with the zamindari of Unchagaon. His grandson Karan Singh inherited the estate in 1898, and upon the latter’s death in 1927, with no direct heirs. The property passed to his ten‑year‑old great‑nephew Surendra Pal Singh. In 1933, upon Surendra Pal Singh’s marriage into the Bharatpur princely family, the fort underwent extensive repairs and stylistic enhancements, blending Rajput and colonial motifs. By the early 21st century, the fort had fallen into disuse until Thakur Bhawani Singh’s descendants converted it into a heritage hotel in July 2000, restoring the historic palaces while preserving 19 acres of mango groves.

== Architecture ==
Fort Unchagaon combines defensive and residential elements with a central courtyard. Its two‑metre‑thick ramparts and bastioned turrets are built of local brick and lime mortar, pierced by narrow gun‑loops for muskets and small cannon. The main gateways feature arched stone lintels and ornate jaali screens, while vaulted corridors connect the Surya Mahal (the princely living quarters) and Mora Mahal (guest chambers). Out-buildings once granaries and stables, stand alongside colonial‑era bungalows, all set within terraced mango orchards that historically supplied the estate and local markets.

== Gallery ==
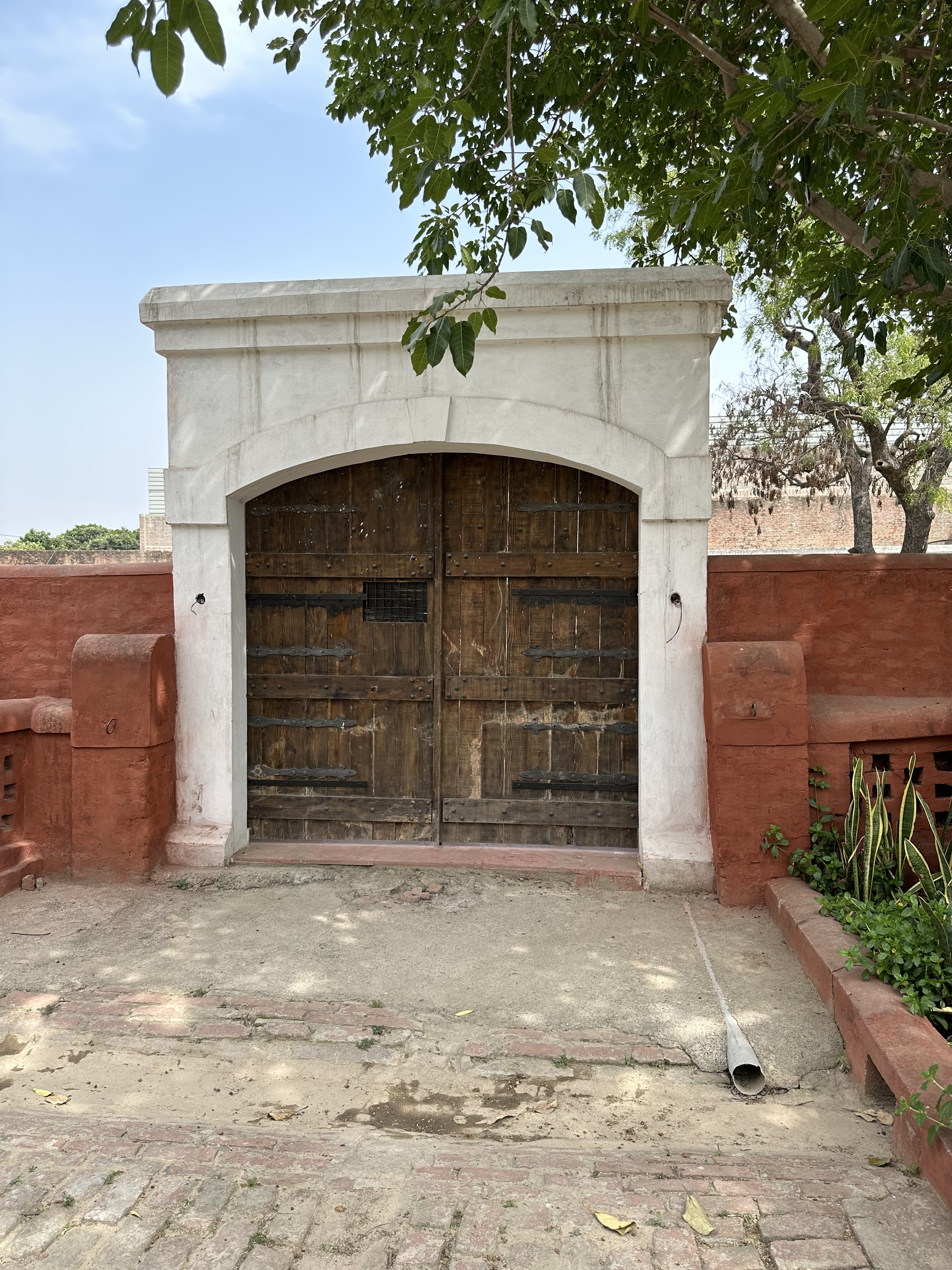
Gate

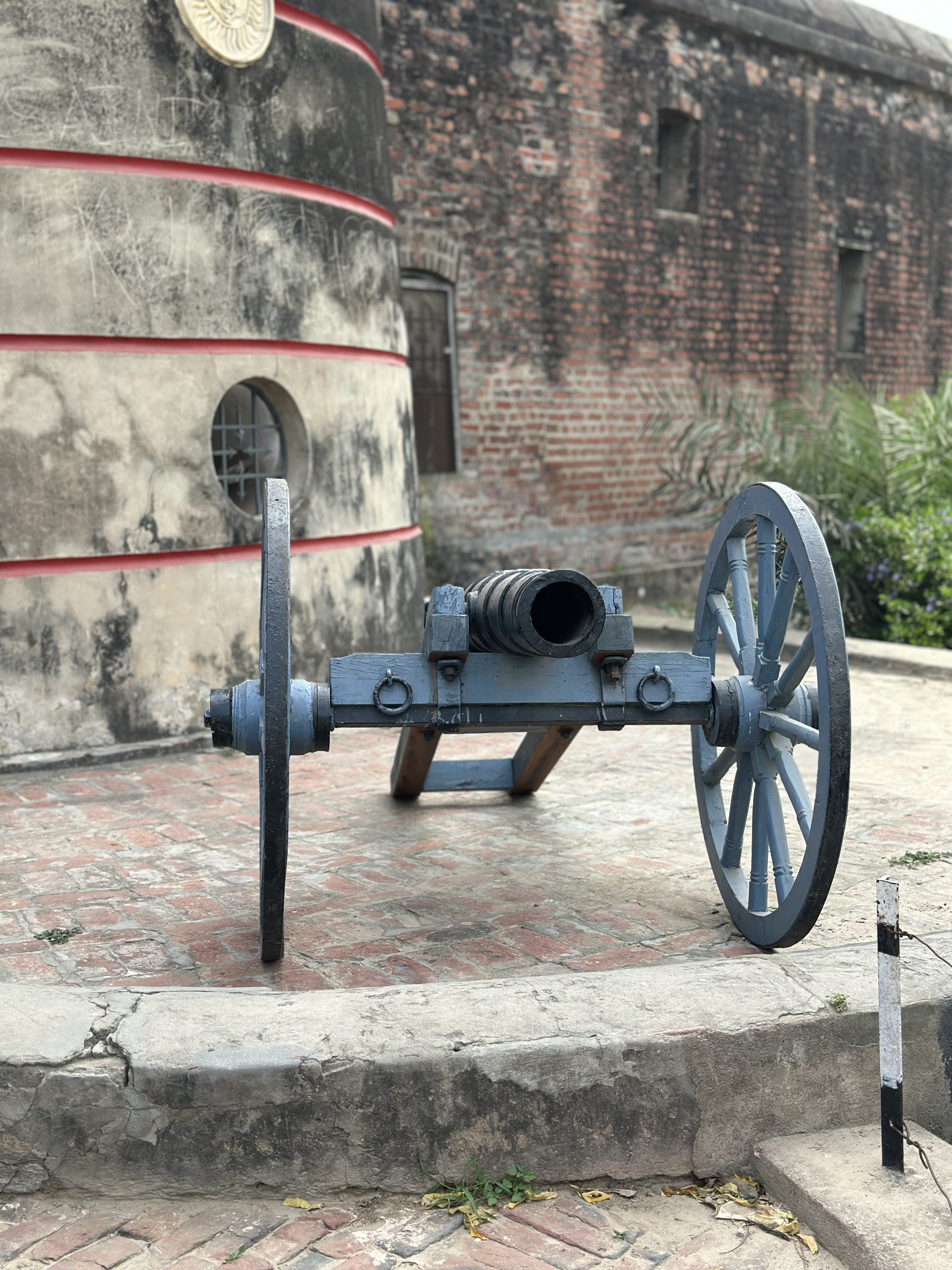
Cannon

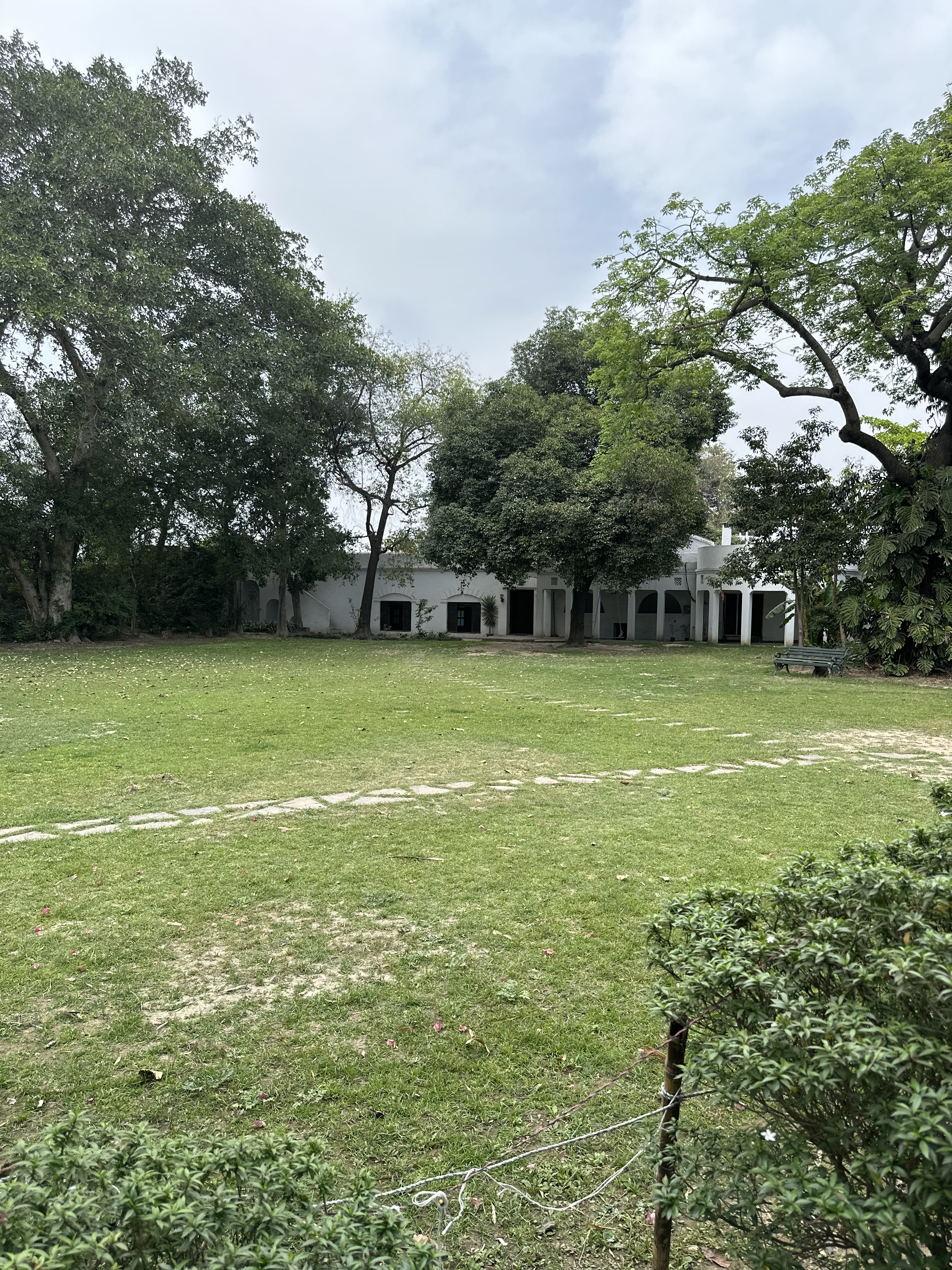
Lawns

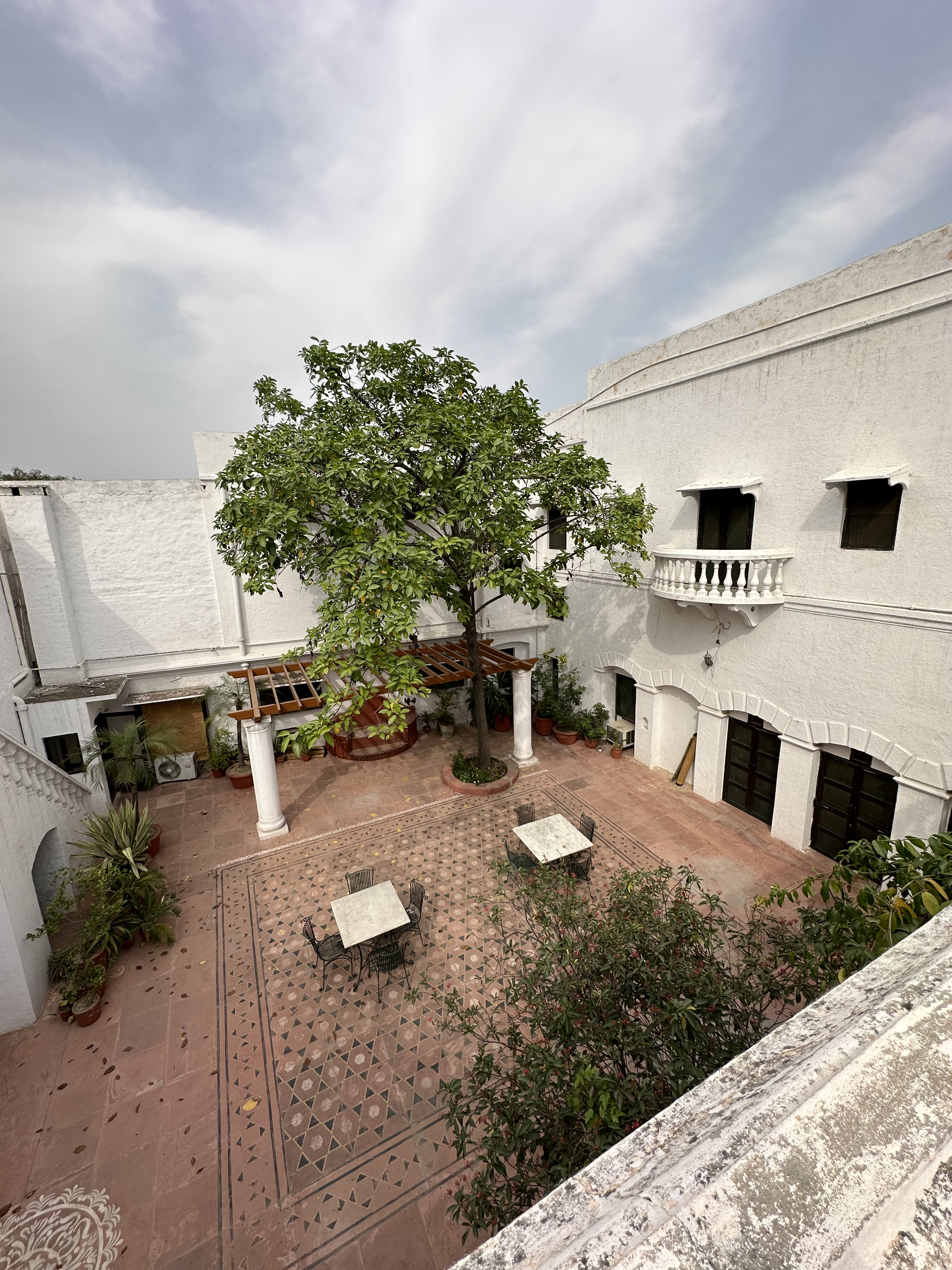
Courtyard

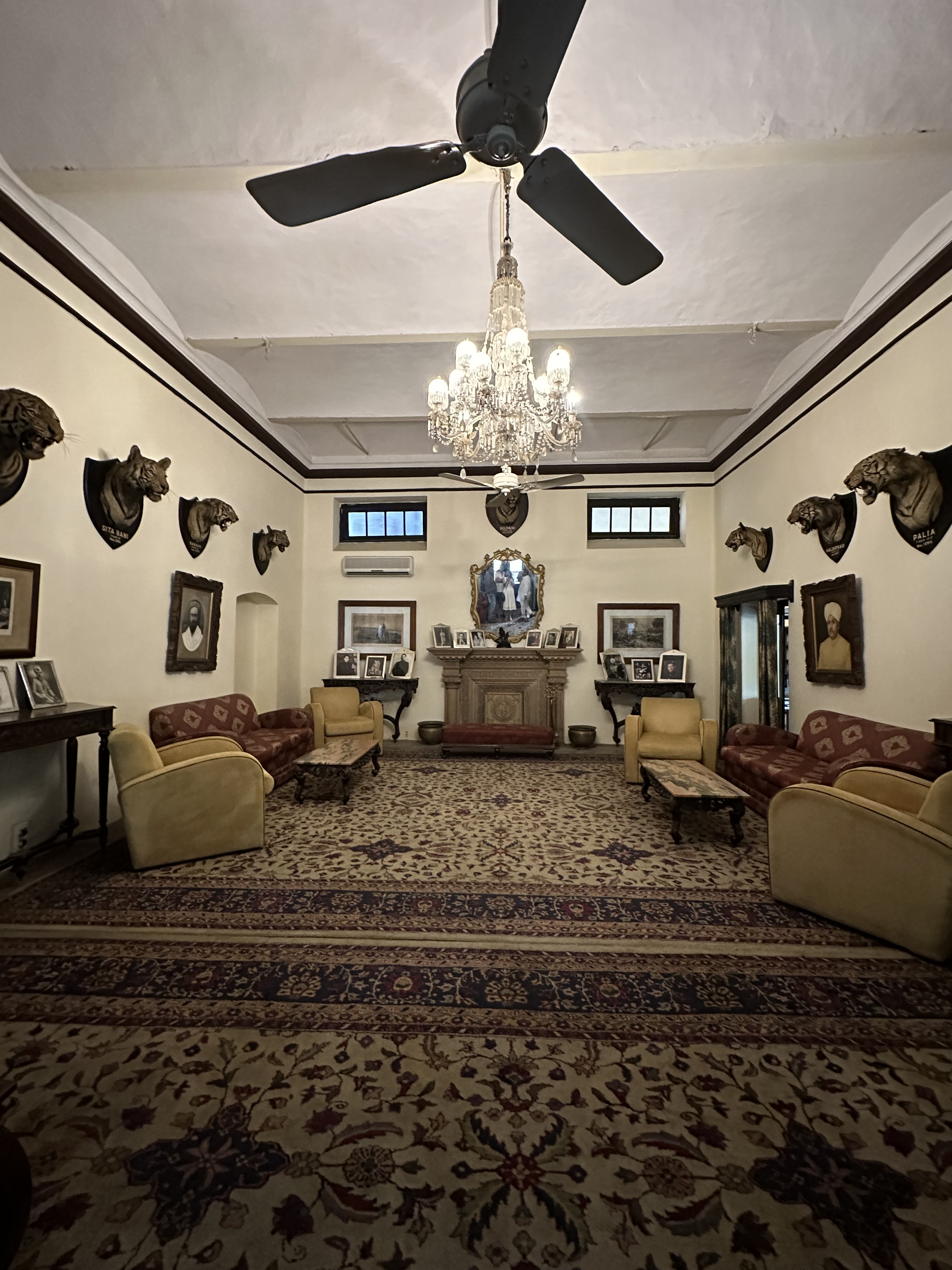
Living room

== See also ==
- List of forts in Uttar Pradesh
