= Gajendra Singh (politician) =

Indian politician (born 1975)

MLA, Legislative Assembly of Uttar Pradesh
- In office March 2012 – March 2017
- Succeeded by: Sanjay
- In office May 2007 – March 2012
- Preceded by: Hoshiyar Singh
- Constituency: Anupshahr

Personal details
- Born: 14 January 1975 (age 51) Anupshahr
- Party: Bahujan Samaj Party
- Spouse: Anita Singh
- Children: 2 sons & 1 daughter
- Education: None
- Profession: Farmer, politician

Gajendra Singh Rajora is an Indian politician and a member of the 16th Legislative Assembly of Uttar Pradesh, in India. He represents the Anupshahr constituency of Uttar Pradesh and is a member of the Bahujan Samaj Party political party.

== Early life and education ==
Gajendra Singh was born in the village of Anupshahr in Bulandshahr to Ranveer Singh. He has not received any formal education.

== Political career ==
Gajendra Singh has been a MLA for two terms. He represented the Anupshahr constituency and is a member of the Bahujan Samaj Party political party.

He lost his seat in the 2017 Uttar Pradesh Assembly election to Sanjay of the Bharatiya Janata Party.

== Posts held ==
#	From	To	Position	Comments
01	March 2012	March 2017	Member, 16th Legislative Assembly	
02	May 2007	March 2012	Member, 15th Legislative Assembly	

== See also ==
- Anupshahr (Assembly constituency)
- Sixteenth Legislative Assembly of Uttar Pradesh
- Uttar Pradesh Legislative Assembly
