= Dilnawaz Khan =

Indian politician

MLA, 16th Legislative Assembly
- In office March 2012 – March 2017
- Preceded by: Sunder Singh
- Succeeded by: Devendra Singh Lodhi
- Constituency: Syana

Personal details
- Born: 1 August 1977 (age 48) Bulandshahar, India
- Party: Rashtriya Lok Dal
- Domestic partner: Sidra Khan

Dilnawaz Khan is an Indian politician and a member of the 16th Legislative Assembly of India. He represented the Syana constituency of Uttar Pradesh.

== Early life and education ==
Dilnawaz Khan was born in Bulandshahar district.

== Political career ==
Dilnawaz Khan has been a MLA for one term. He represented the Syana constituency. Dilnawaz Khan lost his Syana seat to his BJP rival Devendra Singh Lodhi by 71,630 votes.He is now associated with RLD.

== Posts held ==
#	From	To	Position	Comments
01	2012	2017	Member, 16th Legislative Assembly	

== See also ==
- Syana (Assembly constituency)
- Sixteenth Legislative Assembly of Uttar Pradesh
- Uttar Pradesh Legislative Assembly
