= Bhagirathi Majhi =

Indian politician (1954–2020)

Member of Parliament, Rajya Sabha
- In office 24 March 2006 – 1 July 2010
- Preceded by: Chhatrapal Singh Lodha
- Constituency: Odisha

Personal details
- Born: 1 February 1954; Murumdihi, Mayurbhanj, Odisha
- Died: 2 November 2020 (aged 66); Mayurbhanj, Odisha
- Political party: Bharatiya Janata Party
- Spouse: Sumitra Majhi (m. 1976–2020)
- Children: 2 sons, 1 daughter
- Parents: Hada Majhi (father); Digi Majhi (mother)
- Education: Bachelor of Arts
- Alma mater: Utkal University
- Profession: Politician

Bhagirathi Majhi (1 February 1954 – 2 November 2020) was an Indian politician from Bharatiya Janata Party. He was a Member of the Parliament of India representing Orissa in the Rajya Sabha, the upper house of the Indian Parliament.

Majhi died on 2 November 2020, at a hospital in Mayurbhanj district from COVID-19. He was born in Murumdihi, Mayurbhanj / Orissa, and was 66 at the time of his death.
