= Mahmood Hasan Khan =

Indian politician (1930–1982)

Member of Parliament (MP) in Lok Sabha
- In office 1977–1982
- Preceded by: Surendra Pal Singh
- Succeeded by: Surendra Pal Singh
- Constituency: Bulandshahr

Personal details
- Born: 26 January 1930
- Died: 5 December 1982 (aged 52) New Delhi, India
- Party: Janata Party

Mahmood Hasan Khan (26 January 1930 – 5 December 1982) was an Indian politician. He was elected to the Lok Sabha, lower house of the Parliament of India as a member of the Janata Party from Bulandshahr constituency. Khan died in New Delhi on 5 December 1982, at the age of 52.
