= Rajendra Singh (Uttar Pradesh) =

Rajendra Singh is an Indian politician member of 1991 Uttar Pradesh Legislative Assembly election and 1993 Uttar Pradesh Legislative Assembly election party member of Bharatiya Janata Party Constituency Dhampur Assembly constituency.
