= Syana Assembly constituency =

Constituency of the Uttar Pradesh legislative assembly in India

Syana
- Constituency No. 66 for the Uttar Pradesh Legislative Assembly

Constituency details
- Country: India
- Region: North India
- State: Uttar Pradesh
- District: Bulandshahar
- Total electors: 386,914 (2022)
- Reservation: None

Member of Legislative Assembly
- 18th Uttar Pradesh Legislative Assembly
- Incumbent Devendra Singh rajput
- Party: Bharatiya Janata Party
- Elected year: 2022
- Preceded by: Dilnawaz Khan

Syana Assembly constituency is one of the 403 constituencies of the Uttar Pradesh Legislative Assembly, India. It is a part of the Bulandshahar district and one of the five assembly constituencies in the Bulandshahr Lok Sabha constituency. First election in this assembly constituency was held in 1957 after the "DPACO (1956)" (delimitation order) was passed in 1956. After the "Delimitation of Parliamentary and Assembly Constituencies Order" was passed in 2008, the constituency was assigned identification number 66.

== Wards / Areas ==
Extent of Syana Assembly constituency is Syana Tehsil.

== Members of the Legislative Assembly ==
Year	Member	Party
1957	Irtaza Husain	Indian National Congress
1962	Mumtaz Mohammad Khan	Praja Socialist Party
1967	Nempal Singh	Praja Socialist Party
1969	Mumtaz Mohammad Khan	Indian National Congress
1974	Mumtaz Mohammad Khan	Indian National Congress
1977	Arif Mohammad Khan	Janata Party
1980	Chhatrapal Singh Lodha	Janata Party (Secular)
1985	Imtiaz Mohammad Khan	Indian National Congress
1989	Imtiaz Mohammad Khan	Indian National Congress
1991	Vasudev Singh	Bharatiya Janata Party
1993	Vasudev Singh	Bharatiya Janata Party
1996	Rakesh Tyagi	Indian National Congress
2002	Sunder Singh	Rashtriya Kranti Party
2007	Sunder Singh	Bharatiya Janata Party
2012	Dilnawaz Khan	Indian National Congress
2017	Devendra Singh Lodhi	Bharatiya Janata Party
2022	Devendra Singh Lodhi	Bharatiya Janata Party

== Election results ==
=== 2027 ===
2027 Uttar Pradesh Legislative Assembly election: Syana
Party	Candidate	Votes	%	±%
INDIA				
NDA				
BSP				
NOTA	None of the above			
Majority				
Turnout				
gain from		Swing		

=== 2022 ===
2022 Uttar Pradesh Legislative Assembly election: Syana
Party	Candidate	Votes	%	±%
BJP	Devendra Singh Lodhi	149,125	58.9	+4.75
RLD	Dilnawaz Khan	59,468	23.49	+13.84
BSP	Sunil Bharadwaj	36,193	14.29	−9.04
INC	Poonam Pandit	2,914	1.15	−7.72
NOTA	None of the above	1,402	0.55	−0.05
Majority		89,657	35.41	+4.59
Turnout		253,197	65.37	+2.84
BJP hold		Swing		

=== 2017 ===
2017 Uttar Pradesh Legislative Assembly Election: Syana
Party	Candidate	Votes	%	±%
BJP	Devendra Singh Lodhi	125,854	54.15	
BSP	Dilnawaz Khan	54,224	23.33	
RLD	Thakur Sunil Singh	22,420	9.65	
INC	Mohd. Arif Saeed	20,611	8.87	
NOTA	None of the above	1,392	0.6	
Majority		71,630	30.82	
Turnout		232,430	62.53	
BJP gain from INC		Swing		

=== 2012 ===
2012 General Elections: Syana
Party	Candidate	Votes	%	±%
INC	Dilnawaz Khan	53,887	25.79	−
BSP	Devendera Bhardwaj	52,223	25	−
Independent	Sunder Singh	42,470	20.33	−
	Remainder 12 candidates	60,326	28.87	−
Majority		1,664	0.8	−
Turnout		208,906	60.6	−
INC gain from BJP		Swing		

== See also ==
- Bulandshahr Lok Sabha constituency
- Bulandshahar district
- Sixteenth Legislative Assembly of Uttar Pradesh
- Uttar Pradesh Legislative Assembly
