= Nehtaur Assembly constituency =

Constituency of the Uttar Pradesh legislative assembly in India

Nehtaur
- Constituency No. 21 for the Uttar Pradesh Legislative Assembly

Constituency details
- Country: India
- Region: North India
- State: Uttar Pradesh
- District: Bijnor
- Total electors: 257,285 (2012)
- Reservation: SC

Member of Legislative Assembly
- 18th Uttar Pradesh Legislative Assembly
- Incumbent Om Kumar
- Party: Bharatiya Janta Party
- Elected year: 2022

Nehtaur is one of the 403 constituencies of the Uttar Pradesh Legislative Assembly, India. It is a part of the Bijnor district and one of the five assembly constituencies in the Nagina Lok Sabha constituency. First election in this assembly constituency was held in 2012 after the "Delimitation of Parliamentary and Assembly Constituencies Order, 2008" was passed in the year 2008.

== Wards / Areas ==
Extent of Nehtaur Assembly constituency is KC Haldaur & Haldaur MB of Bijnor Tehsil; KC Nehtaur, PCs Athai Shekh, Basera Dasu, Basera Khurd, Bhawanipur Tarkola, Mankua, Dhakka Karmachand, Kotra Tappa Kesho, Pipalsana, Raipur Maluk, Sedha, Sherpur Balla, Tapraula of Dhampur KC & Nehtaur MB of Dhampur Tehsil.

== Members of the Legislative Assembly ==
Year	Member	Party
Till 2012 : Constituency did not exist
2012	Om Kumar	Bahujan Samaj Party
2017	Om Kumar	Bharatiya Janata Party
2022	Om Kumar	Bharatiya Janata Party

== Election results ==
=== 2027 ===
2027 Uttar Pradesh Legislative Assembly election: Nehtapur
Party	Candidate	Votes	%	±%
INDIA				
NDA				
BSP				
NOTA	None of the above			
Majority				
Turnout				
gain from		Swing		

=== 2022 ===
2022 Uttar Pradesh Legislative Assembly election: Nehtaur
Party	Candidate	Votes	%	±%
BJP	Om Kumar	77,935	38.98	−1.74
RLD	Munshiram Singh	77,677	38.86	+35.41
BSP	Priya Singh	38,020	19.02	−5.98
NOTA	None of the above	1,057	0.53	−0.15
Majority		258	0.12	−12.18
Turnout		199,914	65.82	+0.11
BJP hold		Swing		

=== 2017 ===
17th Vidhan Sabha: 2017 General Elections

2017 General Elections: Nehtaur
Party	Candidate	Votes	%	±%
BJP	Om Kumar	76,644	40.72	
INC	Munnalal Premi	53,493	28.42	
BSP	Vivek Singh	47,059	25.0	
RLD	Chandrapal Singh	6,486	3.45	
NOTA	None of the above	1,273	0.68	
Majority		23,151	12.3	
Turnout		188,207	65.71	
BJP gain from BSP		Swing		

== See also ==
- Government of Uttar Pradesh
- Nagina Lok Sabha constituency
- Bijnor district
- Sixteenth Legislative Assembly of Uttar Pradesh
- Uttar Pradesh Legislative Assembly
- Uttar Pradesh
