= Yashvir Singh =

Indian politician

Member of Parliament, Lok Sabha
- In office 2009-2014
- Succeeded by: Yashwant Singh
- Constituency: Nagina, Uttar Pradesh.

Personal details
- Born: 12 December 1972 (age 53). Sahaspur, Bijnor, (Uttar Pradesh).
- Citizenship: India
- Party: Samajwadi Party.
- Spouse: Neetu Rani
- Children: 2
- Education: HBTI, Kanpur.
- Profession: Agriculturist & Politician.

Yashvir Singh is an Indian politician and was Member of Parliament of the 15th Lok Sabha of India. He was elected from the Nagina constituency of Uttar Pradesh in 2009 and was a member of the Samajwadi Party. He joined BJP in 2019.

== Early life and education ==
Yashvir Singh was born in the village (Mahmoodpur), Sahaspur Bijnor, in the state of Uttar Pradesh, to a Dhobi family. An engineer by qualification, Singh holds a B.Tech degree from HBTI, Kanpur. By profession, Singh is an agriculturist.

== Political career ==
Singh was a first-time M.P and also the first elected M.P from the newly formed Nagina constituency. This constituency came into existence in 2008, as a part of the delimitation of parliamentary constituencies based on the recommendations of the Delimitation Commission of India constituted in 2002. He lost his bid for re-election from Nagina constituency in 2014 to BJP candidate Yashwant Singh. In the 2024 Loksabha election, he got a chance again from Bijnor lokhsabha .

== Posts held ==
#	From	To	Position
01	2009	2014	Member, 15th Lok Sabha
02	2009	2014	Member, Committee on Social Justice and Empowerment

== See also ==
- 15th Lok Sabha
- Politics of India
- Parliament of India
- Government of India
- Sahaspur
- Samajwadi Party
- Nagina (Lok Sabha constituency)
