= Chhatrapal Singh Lodha =

Indian politician

Minister of State in the Ministry of Chemicals and Fertilizers
- In office 29 January 2003 – 16 March 2004
- Prime Minister: Atal Bihari Vajpayee
- Minister: Sukhdev Singh Dhindsa

Member of Parliament, Rajya Sabha
- In office 2 July 2004 – 18 December 2005
- Succeeded by: Bhagirathi Majhi
- Constituency: Odisha

Member of Parliament, Lok Sabha
- In office 1991–2004
- Preceded by: Sarwar Hussain
- Succeeded by: Kalyan Singh
- Constituency: Bulandshahr

Member of Uttar Pradesh Legislative Assembly
- In office 1980–1985
- Preceded by: Arif Mohammad Khan
- Succeeded by: Imtiaz Mohammad Khan
- Constituency: Syana

Personal details
- Born: 1 January 1946 (age 80) Bigroun, Bulandshahr district
- Party: Bharatiya Janata Party
- Spouse: Urmila Devi (m. 1967)
- Children: 4 sons, 1 daughter
- Parents: Bhagwant Singh (father); Naryne Devi (mother)
- Education: Bachelor of Ayurveda, Medicine and Surgery
- Alma mater: Masth Nath Ayurvedic Mahavidyalaya, Rohtak (Haryana)
- Profession: Medical Practitioner, Politician

Chhatrapal Singh Lodha is an Indian politician of the Bharatiya Janata Party elected as Rajya Sabha MP from Orissa. He has also served 4 times as Lok Sabha MP of Bulandshahr from 1991 to 2004.

He was one of the accused in the 2005 cash-for-question scandal. In a sting operation named Operation Duryodhana, the media firm Cobrapost caught him on camera accepting a bribe of 15,000 rupees (about US$350) for asking concocted questions in Parliament.

Chairperson of the Rajya Sabha Bhairon Singh Shekhawat asked the Ethics Committee to probe the allegations against Chhatrapal and within 48 hours the panel found the reason for his suspension. As a result, he was expelled from the Rajya Sabha.

His name also figured in the Operation Chakravyuha which accused seven members of parliament including Chhatrapal of seeking kickbacks for getting projects sanctioned under the Members of Parliament Local Area Development Scheme (MPLADS).
