= Munshi Rampal =

Indian politician

Munshi Rampal Member of Parliament

Former Member of Parliament
- Constituency: Nagina (Lok Sabha constituency)

Personal details
- Born: Munshi Ram; 13 January 1957 (age 69) Bijnor
- Citizenship: India
- Party: Rashtriya Lok Dal
- Parent: Ramcharan Singh (Father)
- Education: Diploma in Civil Engineering, U. P., Technical Education Parishad, Lucknow. 1979
- Occupation: Gas Agency & Agriculture
- Profession: Farmer & politician

Munshi Rampal is an Indian politician and former Member of Parliament from Nagina (Lok Sabha constituency). He is state president- Uttar Pradesh in Rashtriya Lok Dal political party.

== Early life and education ==
Rampal completed Diploma in Civil Engineering in 1979 from UP Technical Education Parishad.

== Political career ==
Munshi Rampal is an Indian senior politician and has been Member of Parliament. He is national president of Akhil Bhartiya Khatik Samaj.
