= Sarwar Hussain =

Indian politician

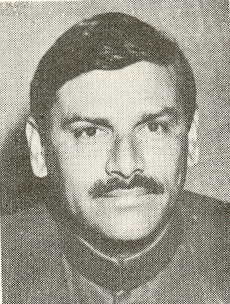

Minister of State for Food and Civil Supplies
- In office 21 November 1990 – 20 February 1991
- Prime Minister: Chandra Shekhar

Member of Parliament, Lok Sabha
- In office 1989–1991
- Preceded by: Surendra Pal Singh
- Succeeded by: Chhatrapal Singh Lodha
- Constituency: Bulandshahr

Personal details
- Born: 15 April 1949 (age 77) Khurja, Uttar Pradesh, India
- Party: Samajwadi Party
- Other political affiliations: Janata Dal; Janata Party
- Spouse: Sajeda Hussain

Sarwar Hussain (born 15 April 1949) is an Indian politician. He was a member of 9th Lok Sabha from Bulandshahr constituency. He served as Union Minister of State in Ministry of Food and Civil Supplies in Chandra Shekhar cabinet from November 1990 to February 1991.

In November 1990, he was one of the 64 MPs who left Janata Dal and formed Chandra Shekhar government.
