= Yashwant Singh (Lok Sabha member) =

Indian politician

Member of Parliament, Lok Sabha
- In office 16 May 2014 – 23 May 2019
- Preceded by: Yashvir Singh
- Succeeded by: Girish Chandra
- Constituency: Nagina

Personal details
- Born: 1 March 1962 (age 64) Churiyala. Muzaffarnagar, Uttar Pradesh
- Party: Bharatiya Janata Party
- Spouse: Raj Kumari
- Profession: Doctor
- As of 15 October, 2015

Yashwant Singh (born 1 March 1962) is a member of the Bharatiya Janata Party and has won the 2014 Indian general elections from the Nagina.

== Early life and education ==
Singh was born on 1 March 1962 to Ramchandra and Keshon Devi in the village Churiyala in Muzaffarnagar district in Uttar Pradesh. Singh is a doctor by profession. He gained his M.B.B.S. from Nehru Medical College and M.D. from All India Institute of Medical Sciences, New Delhi. He married Raj Kumari in October 1991.

== Political career ==
Singh was a Member, State Legislative Assembly, Uttar Pradesh for two consecutive terms, from 2002 to 2012. He was a Minister of State (Independent Charge), from 2007 to 2012. In May 2014, he was elected to the 16th Lok Sabha. From September 2014 till 2019 he was a member of the Standing Committee on Rural Development.
