= Devendra Singh Lodhi =

Indian politician

Member of the Uttar Pradesh Legislative Assembly
- Incumbent
- Assumed office 2017
- Constituency: Syana

Personal details
- Born: 5 January 1962 (age 63)
- Political party: Bharatiya Janata Party

Devendra Singh Lodhi is an Indian politician of the Bharatiya Janata Party. He is a member of the 18th Uttar Pradesh Assembly, representing the Syana Assembly constituency.
