= K. L. Balmiki =

Indian politician (1919–1985)

Kanhaiya Lal Balmiki

Member of Parliament in Lok Sabha
- In office 1952—1962
- Preceded by: constituency created
- Succeeded by: Surendra Pal Singh
- Constituency: Bulandshahr
- In office 1962–1967
- Preceded by: constituency created
- Succeeded by: Ram Charan
- Constituency: Khurja

Personal details
- Born: 14 March 1919 Village Khanai, Baluchistan, British India
- Died: 2 September 1985 (aged 66) New Delhi, India
- Party: Indian National Congress
- Spouse: Ramavati Devi
- Children: 4 (2 sons & 2 daughters)

Kanhaiya Lal Balmiki (14 March 1919 — 2 September 1985) was an Indian politician. He along with Raghubar Dayal Misra were the 1st Lok Sabha MP from the Bulandshahr constituency of Uttar Pradesh as a member of the Indian National Congress. K.L. Balmiki also remained as MP in the 3rd Lok Sabha representing Khurja from 1962 to 1967.

Balmiki was born 14 March 1919 in the village of Khanai (Baluchistan). He was educated in Government Intermediate College, Allahabad and Meerut College. Married to Ramavati Devi on June 15, 1941, they have two sons and two daughters.

Balmiki actively participated in the Quit India Movement. As a student, he participated several times in Hartal and Satyagraha. He was imprisoned as a political detainee during 1943—1945.
