= Thakur Mool Chand Chauhan =

Indian politician

MLA, 16th Legislative Assembly
- In office Mar 2012 – Mar 2017
- Preceded by: Ashok Kumar Rana
- Succeeded by: Ashok Kumar Rana
- Constituency: Dhampur

MLA, 14th Legislative Assembly
- In office 2002–2007
- Preceded by: Thakur Mool Chand Chauhan
- Succeeded by: Ashok Kumar Rana

MLA, 13th Legislative Assembly
- In office 1996–2002
- Preceded by: Rajender Singh
- Succeeded by: Thakur Mool Chand Chauhan

Personal details
- Born: 20 December 1951 (age 74) Bijnor district, Uttar Pradesh
- Citizenship: India
- Party: Samajwadi Party
- Other political affiliations: Bahujan Samaj Party
- Spouse: Kamlesh Devi
- Children: 1 son & 2 daughters.
- Profession: Agriculturist & Politician

Thakur Mool Chand Chauhan is an Indian politician and was a member of the 16th Legislative Assembly of Uttar Pradesh of India. He represented the Dhampur constituency of Uttar Pradesh and is a member of the Samajwadi Party political party.

== Early life and education ==
Thakur Mool Chand Chauhan was born in Bijnor district, Uttar Pradesh. He holds an under graduate degree in economics. Before being elected as MLA, he used to work as an agriculturist.

== Political career ==
Thakur Mool Chand Chauhan has been an MLA for three terms. During all his three terms, he represented the Dhampur constituency as a member of the Samajwadi Party. Chauhan was also a minister in the Government of Uttar Pradesh.

He lost his seat in the 2017 Uttar Pradesh Assembly election to Ashok Kumar Rana of the Bharatiya Janata Party.

== Posts Held ==
#	From	To	Position	Comments
01	1996	2002	Member, 13th Legislative Assembly	
02	2002	2007	Member, 14th Legislative Assembly	
03	2012	Mar-2017	Member, 16th Legislative Assembly	

== See also ==
- Dhampur
- Uttar Pradesh Legislative Assembly
- Government of India
- Politics of India
- Samajwadi Party
