= Najibabad Assembly constituency =

Constituency of the Uttar Pradesh legislative assembly in India

Najibabad
- Constituency No. 17 for the Uttar Pradesh Legislative Assembly

Constituency details
- Country: India
- Region: North India
- State: Uttar Pradesh
- District: Bijnor
- Established: 1956
- Total electors: 302,715 (2012)
- Reservation: None

Member of Legislative Assembly
- 18th Uttar Pradesh Legislative Assembly
- Incumbent Tasleem Ahmad
- Party: Samajwadi Party

Najibabad Assembly constituency is one of the 403 constituencies of the Uttar Pradesh Legislative Assembly, India. It is a part of the Bijnor district and one of the five assembly constituencies in the Nagina Lok Sabha constituency. First election in this assembly constituency was held in 1957 after the delimitation order (DPACO - 1956) was passed in 1956. The constituency was assigned identification number 17 after "Delimitation of Parliamentary and Assembly Constituencies Order, 2008" was passed in the year 2008.

== Wards / Areas ==
Extent of Najibabad Assembly constituency is KCs Najibabad, Nangal, Sahanpur, Sahanpur NP, Jalalabad NP & Najibabad MB of Najibabad Tehsil.

== Members of the Legislative Assembly ==
Year	Member	Party
1957	Hafiz Mohamad Ibrahim	Indian National Congress
1958^	Atiqur Rehman	Indian National Congress
1962	Shri Ram	Bharatiya Jana Sangh
1967	K. D. Singh	Independent
1969	Devender Singh	Bharatiya Kranti Dal
1974	Sukhan Singh	Indian National Congress
1977	Mukandi Singh	Janata Party
1980	Rati Ram	Indian National Congress (I)
1985	Sukkam Singh	Indian National Congress
1989	Valdeva Singh	Bahujan Samaj Party
1991	Rajendra Prasad	Bharatiya Janata Party
1993	Ramswaroop Singh	Communist Party of India (Marxist)
1996	Ramswaroop Singh	Communist Party of India (Marxist)
2002	Ramswaroop Singh	Communist Party of India (Marxist)
2007	Sheesharam Singh	Bahujan Samaj Party
2012	Tasleem Ahmad	Bahujan Samaj Party
2017	Tasleem Ahmad	Samajwadi Party
2022	Tasleem Ahmad	Samajwadi Party

== Election results ==
=== 2027 ===
2027 Uttar Pradesh Legislative Assembly election: Najibabad
Party	Candidate	Votes	%	±%
INDIA				
NDA				
BSP				
NOTA	None of the above			
Majority				
Turnout				
gain from		Swing		

=== 2022 ===
2022 Uttar Pradesh Legislative Assembly election: Najibabad
Party	Candidate	Votes	%	±%
SP	Tasleem Ahmad	102,675	44.14	▲6.59
BJP	Bharatendra Singh	78,905	33.92	▼2.7
BSP	Shahnawaz Alam	44,727	19.23	▼1.64
NOTA	None of the above	1,372	0.59	▼0.12
Majority		23,770	10.22	▲9.29
Turnout		232,615	67.1	▲1.58
SP hold		Swing		

=== 2017 ===
2017 Uttar Pradesh Legislative Assembly election: Najibabad
Party	Candidate	Votes	%	±%
SP	Tasleem Ahmad	81,082	37.55	
BJP	Rajiv Kumar Agarwal	79,080	36.62	
BSP	Jameel Ahmed	45,070	20.87	
RLD	Leena Singhal	3,587	1.66	
AIMIM	Tazeem Siddiqui	2,094	0.97	
NOTA	None of the above	1,516	0.71	
Majority		2,002	0.93	
Turnout		215,936	65.52	
SP gain from BSP		Swing		

=== 2012 ===
16th Vidhan Sabha: 2012 General Elections.

2012 General Elections: Najibabad
Party	Candidate	Votes	%	±%
BSP	Tasleem Ahmad	62,713	33.54	−
BJP	Rajeev Kumar Agarwal	51,130	27.35	−
RLD	Abrar Alam	30,885	16.52	−
	Remainder 16 candidates	42,246	22.6	−
Majority		11,583	6.19	−
Turnout		186,974	61.77	−
BSP hold		Swing		

== See also ==
- Government of Uttar Pradesh
- Nagina Lok Sabha constituency
- List of Vidhan Sabha constituencies of Uttar Pradesh
- Bijnor district
- Sixteenth Legislative Assembly of Uttar Pradesh
- Uttar Pradesh Legislative Assembly
- Uttar Pradesh
