= Anupshahr Assembly constituency =

Vidhan Sabha constituency in Uttar Pradesh

Anupshahr
- Constituency No. 67 for the Uttar Pradesh Legislative Assembly

Constituency details
- Country: India
- Region: North India
- State: Uttar Pradesh
- District: Bulandshahar
- Established: 1951
- Total electors: 328,833 (2012)
- Reservation: None

Member of Legislative Assembly
- 18th Uttar Pradesh Legislative Assembly
- Incumbent Sanjay Kumar Sharma
- Party: Bharatiya Janata Party
- Alliance: NDA
- Elected year: 2022
- Preceded by: Gajendra Singh

Anupshahr Assembly constituency is one of the 403 constituencies of the Uttar Pradesh Legislative Assembly, India. It is a part of the Bulandshahar district and one of the five assembly constituencies in the Bulandshahr Lok Sabha constituency. First election in this assembly constituency was held in 1952 after the "DPACO (1951)" (delimitation order) was passed in 1950. After the "Delimitation of Parliamentary and Assembly Constituencies Order" was passed in 2008, the constituency was assigned identification number 67.

== Wards / Areas ==
Extent of Anupshahr Assembly constituency is PCs Fatehpur, Serora, Maujpur, Paharpur, Shikoi, Parli, Anupshahr Bangar, Salamatpur, Anivas, Malakpur, Birauli of Anupshahar KC, PCs Jatpura, Sankhni, Navi Nagar, Tetauta Urf Veergaun, Jahangirabad, Bamanpur, Jaser, Khadana, Khanoda, Ahamadnagar Urf Toli, Bhiroli, Ahar, Khalour, Dungra Jat, Jatvaai, Badar Khan, Moharsa of Jahangirabad KC, Anup Shahr MB & Jahangirabad MB of Anupshahr Tehsil; KC Aurangabad & Aurangabad NP of Bulandshahr Tehsil.

== Members of the Legislative Assembly ==
Year	Winner	Party
1952	Din Dayal	Indian National Congress
1957	Din Dayal	Indian National Congress
1962	Chunni Lal	Indian National Congress
1967	D. Kumar	Bharatiya Jana Sangh
1969	Khacheru Singh Moharia	Indian National Congress
1974	Khacheru Singh Moharia	Bharatiya Kranti Dal
1977	Beni Prasad	Janata Party
1980	Praveen Kumar Sharma	Indian National Congress (Indira)
1985	Praveen Kumar Sharma	Indian National Congress
1989	Hoshiyar Singh	Janata Dal
1991	Naval Kishor	Bharatiya Janata Party
1993	Naval Kishor	Bharatiya Janata Party
1996	Satish Sharma	Indian National Congress
2002	Hoshiyar Singh	Independent politician
2007	Gajendra Singh	Bahujan Samaj Party
2012	Gajendra Singh	Bahujan Samaj Party
2017	Sanjay Kumar Sharma	Bharatiya Janata Party
2022	Sanjay Kumar Sharma	Bharatiya Janata Party

== Election results ==
=== 2027 ===
2027 Uttar Pradesh Legislative Assembly election: Anupshahr
Party	Candidate	Votes	%	±%
INDIA				
NDA				
BSP				
NOTA	None of the above			
Majority				
Turnout				
gain from		Swing		

=== 2022 ===
2022 Uttar Pradesh Legislative Assembly election: Anupshahr
Party	Candidate	Votes	%	±%
BJP	Sanjay Kumar Sharma	125,602	52.64	▲3.71
BSP	Rameshwar Singh	47,979	20.11	▼2.57
NCP	K. K. Sharma	44,180	18.52	
INC	Gajendra Singh	13,321	5.58	
NOTA	None of the above	1,345	0.56	▼0.15
Majority		77,623	32.53	▲6.28
Turnout		238,600	62.87	▼0.71
BJP hold		Swing		

=== 2017 ===
2017 General Elections: Anupshahr
Party	Candidate	Votes	%	±%
BJP	Sanjay Kumar Sharma	112,431	48.93	
BSP	Gajendra Singh	52,117	22.68	
SP	Syed Himayat Ali	48,610	21.16	
RLD	Hoshiyar Singh	11,628	5.06	
NOTA	None of the above	1,620	0.71	
Majority		60,314	26.25	
Turnout		229,765	63.58	
BJP gain from BSP		Swing		

=== 2012 ===
2012 General Elections: Anupshahr
Party	Candidate	Votes	%	±%
BSP	Gajendra Singh	51,761	26.53	−
SP	Syed Himayat Ali	48,260	24.73	−
Independent	Hoshiyar Singh	41,296	21.17	−
	Remainder 13 candidates	53,795	27.6	−
Majority		3,501	1.79	−
Turnout		195,112	59.33	−
BSP hold		Swing		

== See also ==
- Bulandshahar district
- Bulandshahr Lok Sabha constituency
- Sixteenth Legislative Assembly of Uttar Pradesh
- Uttar Pradesh Legislative Assembly
