= Sattar Ahmad =

Indian politician (born 1934)

Member of the Uttar Pradesh Legislative Assembly
- In office 1969–1977
- Preceded by: G. Sahai
- Succeeded by: Haripal Singh Shastri
- Constituency: Dhampur

Personal details
- Born: 2 February 1934
- Political party: Indian National Congress
- Spouse: Zubaida Begum
- Parent: Haji Jamal Ahmad (father)
- Education: B.Com, L.L.B, D.B.A
- Alma mater: Aligarh Muslim University

Sattar Ahmad (born 2 February 1934, Hindi: सत्तार अहमद, Urdu: ستار احمد انصاری) was an Indian politician. He was a member of the 5th and 6th Legislative Assembly of Uttar Pradesh of India He represented the Dhampur Assembly constituency of Uttar Pradesh, and is member of the Indian National Congress.
