= Sheesharam Singh =

Indian politician (c.1945–2019)

Uttar Pradesh Legislative Assembly
- In office 2007–2012
- Preceded by: Ramswaroop Singh
- Succeeded by: Tasleem Ahmad
- Constituency: Najibabad

Personal details
- Born: c. 1945
- Died: 29 December 2019 (aged 74)
- Party: Bahujan Samaj Party

Sheesharam Singh (c. 1945 – 29 December 2019) was an Indian politician from Uttar Pradesh belonging to Bahujan Samaj Party. He was a member of the Uttar Pradesh Legislative Assembly.

== Biography ==
Singh was elected as a member of the Uttar Pradesh Legislative Assembly from Najibabad in 2007. He was a graduate.

Singh died on 29 December 2019.
