= Noorpur Assembly constituency =

Constituency of the Uttar Pradesh legislative assembly in India

Noorpur
- Constituency No. 24 for the Uttar Pradesh Legislative Assembly

Constituency details
- Country: India
- Region: North India
- State: Uttar Pradesh
- District: Bijnor
- Total electors: 213969 (2022)
- Reservation: None

Member of Legislative Assembly
- 18th Uttar Pradesh Legislative Assembly
- Incumbent Ram Avtar Singh Saini
- Party: Samajwadi Party
- Elected year: 2022

Noorpur Assembly constituency is one of the 403 constituencies of the Uttar Pradesh Legislative Assembly, India. It is a part of the Bijnor district and one of the five assembly constituencies in the Nagina Lok Sabha constituency. The first election in this assembly constituency was held in 1967 after the delimitation order (Delimitation Commission (1964)) was passed in 1964. The constituency ceased to exist in 1976 when the delimitation order (DPACO 1976) was passed. In 2008, the constituency was again created when "Delimitation of Parliamentary and Assembly Constituencies Order, 2008" was passed.

== Wards / Areas ==
Extent of Noorpur Assembly constituency is KC Boodhpur PCs Haizarpur Bhatt, Mahamdabad, Paijaniya, Shivala, Nayak Nangla,

- Chandpur tehsil :-

Sujatpur Tikar, Khaspura Umribarhi, Chajupura & Chehla of Phoona KC Noorpur MB of Chandpur Tehsil;

- Sahaspur region:-

KC Sahaspur, Mewanawada , Kiwad, Mevajat, Alampuri, Mehmoodpur, Sipaiwalla, Maqoosdpur, Hiranpura, Vill.Rasoopurkasba PCs Budhanpur, Kuri Bangar, Lamba Khera, Moh. Alipur Inayat, Pithapur, Sadafal of Seohara KC & Sahaspur NP of Dhampur Tehsil.

== Members of the Legislative Assembly ==
Year	Member	Party
1967	Khub Singh	Indian National Congress
1969	Sheo Nath Singh	Bharatiya Kranti Dal
1974-2012 : Constituency did not exist
2012	Lokendra Singh	Bharatiya Janata Party
2017	Lokendra Singh	Bharatiya Janata Party
2018^	Naim Ul Hasan	Samajwadi Party
2022	Ram Avtar Singh	Samajwadi Party

== Election results ==
=== 2027 ===
2027 Uttar Pradesh Legislative Assembly election: Noorpur
Party	Candidate	Votes	%	±%
INDIA				
NDA				
BSP				
NOTA	None of the above			
Majority				
Turnout				
gain from		Swing		

=== 2022 ===
2022 Uttar Pradesh Legislative Assembly election: Noorpur
Party	Candidate	Votes	%	±%
SP	Ram Avtar Singh	92,574	43.27	−6.96
BJP	Chandra Prakash Singh	86,509	40.43	−6.80
BSP	Haji Ziyauddin	31,300	14.63	
NOTA	None of the above	946	0.44	−0.10
Majority		6,065	2.84	−0.16
Turnout		213,969	65.94	+4.31
SP hold		Swing		

=== 2018 bypoll ===
By-Elections, 2018: Noorpur
Party	Candidate	Votes	%	±%
SP	Naim Ul Hasan	94,875	50.23	+17.52
BJP	Avnish Singh	89,213	47.23	+8.25
NOTA	None of the above	1,012	0.54	−0.01
Majority		5,662	3.00	−3.27
Turnout		188,883	61.63	−5.30
SP gain from BJP		Swing		

=== 2017 ===
2017 Uttar Pradesh Legislative Assembly election: Noorpur
Party	Candidate	Votes	%	±%
BJP	Lokendra Singh	79,172	38.98	
SP	Naim Ul Hasan	66,436	32.71	
BSP	Gohar Iqbal	45,902	22.6	
MD	Vijaypal Singh	5,338	2.63	
RLD	Yogesh Tyagi	2,172	1.07	
NOTA	None of the above	1,115	0.55	
Majority		12,736	6.27	
Turnout		203,108	66.93	
BJP hold		Swing		

=== 2012 ===
2012 Uttar Pradesh Legislative Assembly election: Noorpur
Party	Candidate	Votes	%	±%
BJP	Lokendra Singh	47,566	26.94	
BSP	Mohd Usman	42,093	23.84	
SP	Haji Qutbuddin	34,798	19.71	
	Remainder 9 candidates	52,122	29.52	
Majority		5,473	3.1	
Turnout		176,579	65.51	−
BJP hold		Swing		

== See also ==
- Nagina Lok Sabha constituency
- Sahaspur
- Bijnor district
- Government of Uttar Pradesh
- List of Vidhan Sabha constituencies of Uttar Pradesh
- Sixteenth Legislative Assembly of Uttar Pradesh
- Uttar Pradesh Legislative Assembly
- Uttar Pradesh
