= Khub Singh =

Indian politician

Khub Singh is an Indian politician member who served in the Uttar Pradesh Legislative Assembly from 1957 until 1967, representing the Dhampur Assembly constituency as a member of the Indian National Congress.
