= Kamlesh Balmiki =

Indian politician (1967–2019)

Member of Parliament (MP) in Lok Sabha
- In office 16 May 2009 – 16 May 2014
- Preceded by: Kalyan Singh
- Succeeded by: Bhola Singh
- Constituency: Bulandshahr

Personal details
- Born: 3 December 1967 Bulandshahr, Uttar Pradesh, India
- Died: 27 May 2019 (aged 51) Bulandshahr, Uttar Pradesh, India
- Party: Samajwadi Party
- Spouse: Sabita Devi (m. 1985–2019)
- Children: 1 son

Kamlesh Balmiki (12 March 1967 – 27 May 2019) was a member of Lok Sabha, Lower House of the Parliament of India. He was elected to 15th Lok Sabha in 2009 and he represented Bulandshahr, a parliamentary constituency in Uttar Pradesh state.

== Social and Cultural Activities ==
He associated himself with various social organisations.

Lok Sabha
| Preceded by Kalyan Singh | Member of Parliament for Bulandshahr; 2009–2014 | Succeeded by Bhola Singh |
