= Sanjay Kumar Sharma =

Indian politician

Sanjay Kumar Sharma is an Indian politician who is serving as Member of 18th Uttar Pradesh Legislative Assembly from Anupshahr Assembly constituency. In 2022 Uttar Pradesh Legislative Assembly election, he won with 1,25,602 votes.
