= Tasleem Ahmad =

Indian politician

MLA, 18th Uttar Pradesh Assembly
- Incumbent
- Assumed office Mar 2022
- Preceded by: Self
- Constituency: Najibabad

MLA, 17th Legislative Assembly of Uttar Pradesh
- In office Mar 2017 – March 2022
- Preceded by: Self

Personal details
- Born: 15 February 1960 (age 66) Bijnor district, Uttar Pradesh, India
- Party: Samajwadi Party
- Other political affiliations: Bahujan Samaj Party
- Spouse: Farhat Parveen
- Children: 4
- Parent: Shamim Ahmad
- Profession: Businessperson, politician

Tasleem is an Indian politician and a member of the 18th Uttar Pradesh Assembly and was also 17th Uttar Pradesh Assembly and 16th Legislative Assembly member of Uttar Pradesh, India. He represents the Najibabad constituency of Uttar Pradesh and was a member of the Bahujan Samaj Party political party.

== Early life and education ==
Tasleem was born in Bijnor district, Uttar Pradesh. He has received education till twelfth grade. Before being elected as MLA, he used to work as a businessperson.

== Political career ==
Tasleem has been a MLA for two terms. He represents the Najibabad constituency and is a member of the Samajwadi Party.

== Posts held ==
#	From	To	Position	Comments
01	March 2012	March 2017	Member, 16th Legislative Assembly	
02	March 2017	March 2022	Member, 17th Legislative Assembly	
03	March 2022	Incumbent	Member, 18th Legislative Assembly	

== See also ==
- Najibabad
- Uttar Pradesh Legislative Assembly
- Government of India
- Politics of India
- Bahujan Samaj Party
