= Seohara =

- Town
- Syohara
- Location in Uttar Pradesh, India
- Coordinates: 29.22°N 78.58°E
- Country: India
- State: Uttar Pradesh
- District: Bijnor

Government
  - Chairman: Faisal Warsi Hussain (Ind.)
- Elevation: 211 m (692 ft)

Population (2001)
  - Total: 43,985

Languages
  - Official: Hindi
- Time zone: UTC+5:30 (IST)
- PIN: 246746
- Telephone code: 01344
- Vehicle registration: UP-20

Seohara is a town and a municipal board situated between Sahaspur and Dhampur in Bijnor district in the Indian state of Uttar Pradesh.

== Geography ==
Seohara is located at 29.22°N 78.58°E. It has an average elevation of 211 metres (692 feet). Seohara is situated on Haridwar- Moradabad State highway. East of Seohara is situated another town called Sahaspur, while to the west is Dhampur, south, Raja Ka Tajpur, and in the north flows the river Ramganga about eight kilometers from the town.

== Demographics ==
As of 2001 India census, Seohara had a population of 43,985. Males constitute 53% of the population and females 47%. Seohara has an average literacy rate of 68%, higher than the national of 59.5%: male literacy is 74%, and female literacy is 62%. In Seohara, 17% of the population is under 6 years of age. In 1901 the population of the town was 10,062 (as per Imperial Gazetteer 2 of India, vol II, Page 283).

== Notable people ==
- Faisal Warsi Hussain :- Politician
- Umar Tyagi :- Indian Digital Entrepreneur
