= Bhola Singh (Uttar Pradesh politician) =

Politician from India

Member of Parliament, Lok Sabha
- Incumbent
- Assumed office 16 May 2014
- Preceded by: Kamlesh Balmiki
- Constituency: Bulandshahr

Personal details
- Born: 10 September 1977 (age 48) Bohich, Bulandshahr, Uttar Pradesh
- Party: Bharatiya Janata Party
- Spouse: Anuradha Singh (m. 2002)
- Children: 2 sons
- Parents: Kishan Lal Singh (father); Mallo Devi (mother)
- Occupation: Agriculturist
- As of 17 December, 2016

Dr Bhola Singh (born 10 September 1977; Hindi pronunciation: [bʱoːlaː sɪŋgʱ]) is an Indian politician from Shikarpur, Bulandshahr district belonging to Bhartiya Janata Party. He is director of Yaskin Infotech and Yaskin Enterprises.

He contested and was elected in 2014 and 2019 Lok Sabha elections from Bulandshahr (Lok Sabha constituency) as BJP candidate.

== Early life and education ==
Bhola Singh was born on 10 September 1977 to Shri Kishan Lal Singh and Smt. Mallo Devi. He was born in a village named Bohich in Bulandshahr district in Uttar Pradesh. Bhola Singh completed his graduation from Chaudhary Charan Singh (CCS) University, Meerut. He married Anuradha Singh on 6 May 2002.

== Positions held ==
Bhola Singh has been elected 3 times as Lok Sabha MP.

#	From	To	Positions	Party
1.	2014	2019	MP (1st term) in 16th Lok Sabha from Bulandshahr	BJP
2.	2019	2024	MP (2nd term) in 17th Lok Sabha from Bulandshahr	BJP
3.	2024	Present	MP (3rd term) in 18th Lok Sabha from Bulandshahr	BJP
