= Unchagaon =

Coordinates: 28°29′13″N 78°09′07″E

Unchagaon is a village in Azamgarh district, Uttar Pradesh, India.

== See also ==
- Fort Unchagaon
