= Chhutmalpur =

- Town
- Location in Uttar Pradesh, India Chhutmalpur (India)
- Coordinates: 30°02′08″N 77°45′06″E
- Country: India
- State: Uttar Pradesh
- District: Saharanpur
- Elevation: 279 m (915 ft)

Population (2011)
  - Total: 14,274

Languages
  - Official: Hindi
- Time zone: UTC+5:30 (IST)
- Vehicle registration: UP-11
- Website: up.gov.in

Chhutmalpur is a town in Saharanpur district in the state of Uttar Pradesh, India. It lies about 25 kilometres (16 mi) north of Saharanpur and 40 kilometres (25 mi) south of Dehradun on National Highway 73.

== Demographics ==
As of 2011 India census, Chhutmalpur had a population of 14,274. Males constitute 52.27% of the population and females 47.72%. Chhutmalpur has a literacy rate of 79.46%, higher than the national average of 74.04%; with male literacy of 86.14% and female literacy of 72.15%. 14.14% of the population is under 6 years of age.

=== Bus connectivity ===
Chhutmalpur is a UPSRTC bus depot and has frequent bus connectivity to Saharanpur, Dehradun, Roorkee, Haridwar etc. It also falls on a number of interstate bus routes frequently connecting Delhi, Punjab, Haryana, Rajasthan, Himachal Pradesh with major towns in Uttarakhand.

=== Other modes of transport ===
There are private 3-wheelers and minibuses that operate on Chhutmalpur-Saharanpur, Chhutmalpur-Roorkee and Chhutmalpur-Behat routes on shared basis.

=== Railway link ===
Chhutmalpur is not connected by railway network. Nearest railway stations are Saharanpur and Roorkee.
