= Ram Avtar Singh =

Indian politician

Member of the Uttar Pradesh Legislative Assembly
- Incumbent
- Assumed office 2022
- Constituency: Noorpur Assembly constituency

Personal details
- Party: Samajwadi Party
- Occupation: Politician

Ram Avtar Singh is an Indian politician from the Samajwadi Party serving as a member of the Uttar Pradesh Legislative Assembly from the Noorpur Assembly constituency since 2022.
