= Sahaspur =

- Town
- Location in Uttar Pradesh, India Sahaspur (India)
- Coordinates: 29°07′15″N 78°37′15″E
- Country: India
- State: Uttar Pradesh
- District: Bijnor
- Elevation: 199 m (653 ft)

Population (2011)
  - Total: 24,463

Languages
  - Official: Hindi Urdu English
- Time zone: UTC+5:30 (IST)
- Postal code: 246745
- Vehicle registration: UP20
- Website: up.gov.in

Sahaspur is a town and a nagar panchayat in Bijnor district in the Indian state of Uttar Pradesh.

== Geography ==
Sahaspur has an average elevation of 199 metres (653 feet).

== Demographics ==
Sahaspur is divided into 15 wards, with elections held every 5 years. According to the 2011 census of India, the population was 24,463, of which 12,822 are males while 11,641 are females.

The population of Children with age of 0-6 is 3719 which is 15.20% of total population of Sahaspur (NP). In Sahaspur Nagar Panchayat, the female sex ratio is 908 against the state average of 912. Moreover, the child sex ratio in Sahaspur is around 972 compared to Uttar Pradesh state average of 902. The literacy rate of Sahaspur city is 60.60% lower than the state average of 67.68%. In Sahaspur, male literacy is around 64.05% while the female literacy rate is 56.76%.

Religion Sahaspur (2011)
1. Hinduism (8.54%)
2. Islam (91.2%)
3. Sikhism (0.01%)
4. Jainism (0.00%)
5. Christianity (0.11%)
6. Buddhism (0.00%)
7. Other or Not stated (0.18%)

=== Languages ===
Languages of Sahaspur (2011)
1. Hindi (60.7%)
2. Urdu (40.2%)

Hindi and Urdu are the official languages. At the time of the 2011 Census of India,60.70% of the population of the sahaspur spoke Hindi, 40.25% Urdu as their first language.

== Notable people ==
- Tanzil Ahmed (D.S.P, NIA)
- Lokendra Singh (ex-MLA 24noorpur)
- Yashvir Singh (ex- MP 5 Nagina Lok sabha)
