= Ashok Kumar Rana =

Indian politician

MLA in 18th Uttar Pradesh Assembly
- Incumbent
- Assumed office March 2022
- Constituency: Dhampur (Assembly constituency)

MLA in 17th Legislative Assembly of Uttar Pradesh
- In office March 2017 – March 2022
- Preceded by: Mool Chand Chauhan
- Succeeded by: Self

MLA in 15th Legislative Assembly of Uttar Pradesh
- In office May 2007 – March 2012
- Preceded by: Mool Chand Chauhan
- Succeeded by: Mool Chand Chauhan
- Constituency: Dhampur (Assembly constituency)

MLA in 10th Legislative Assembly of Uttar Pradesh
- In office December 1989 – April 1991
- Preceded by: Mahaveer Singh
- Succeeded by: Shiv Nath Singh
- Constituency: Seohara Assembly Constituency

Personal details
- Born: Raja Ka Tajpur, Bijnor
- Citizenship: Indian
- Party: Bhartiya Janta Party
- Spouse: Jyoti Kiran (wife)
- Children: Rana Priyankar Singh (son)
- Parent: Master Hori Singh (father) Shanti Devi (mother)
- Education: Saint Thomas College, Dehradun
- Occupation: Businessman
- Profession: Politician

Ashok Kumar Rana is an Indian politician from Western Uttar Pradesh, associated with the Bharatiya Janata Party. He is a member of the 18th Legislative Assembly and has earlier been part of the Seventeenth Legislative Assembly of Uttar Pradesh representing the Dhampur assembly constituency.

He is a three-time M.L.A. from Dhampur and one-time MLA from Seohara.

== Political career ==
Ashok Kumar Rana has been a member of the 10th, 15th and 17th Legislative Assembly of Uttar Pradesh. Since 2017, he has represented the Dhampur (Assembly constituency) and is a member of the Bhartiya Janata Party. He defeated Samajwadi Party candidate Mool Chand Chauhan by a margin of 17,864 votes. He was re-elected as BJP candidate in 2022, defeating Naim Ul Hasan by 203 votes.

== Posts held ==
#	From	To	Position	Comments
01	March 2017	March 2022	Member, 17th Legislative Assembly	
02	March 2022	Incumbent	Member, 18th Legislative Assembly of Uttar Pradesh	
