= Bhim Army =

Indian social organization

- Named after: Dr. Bhimrao Ambedkar
- Formation: 21 July 2015; 11 years ago
- Founder: Chandrashekhar Azad; Vinay Ratan Singh
- Founded at: Uttar Pradesh
- Secretary General: Kamal Singh Walia
- Chief of Bhim Army: Chandrashekhar Azad (politician)

The Bhim Army, alternatively Bheem Army (lit."Ambedkar Army") or the Bheem Army Bharat Ekta Mission (translation: "Ambedkar Army Indian Unity Mission") is a radical Ambedkarite and Dalit rights organisation in India. It was founded by Satish Kumar, Vinay Ratan Singh and Chandrashekhar Azad in 2015. The organisation runs more than 350 free schools for Dalits and Muslims in Uttar Pradesh. The organisation is named after B. R. Ambedkar.

== Mission ==
Bhim Army's stated mission is "direct action based on confrontation to preserve or restore the dignity of Dalit" and it has an estimated 20,000 followers in the Saharanpur region, which has a 20% Dalit population. The Bhim Army is aimed at supporting the marginalized sections of society such as Dalits, Muslims and farmers, and more broadly what the founder of the organisation Chandrashekhar Azad describes as "the communities which include SCs, STs, and Muslim minorities who had been away from the mainstream for long". He has said that "We may even gherao the Vidhan Sabha in support of our demands". He has sought to build a coalition between Dalit and Muslims against the BJP, and has described himself as a supporter of the Indian Constitution and an opponent of theocracy and Manuvāda ideology.

== History ==
Chandra Shekhar Aazad founded the Bhim Army in 2015 to protect constitutional rights and oppose caste-based oppression. The group formed after reports of discrimination and caste-based violence faced by Dalit students at AHP Inter-college in Uttar Pradesh, and the Bhim Army then helped protect the Dalit students.

Azad gained attention after publicly posting a sign which read "The Great Chamar of Dhadkauli Welcome You." Upper-caste Rajputs were upset with the Dalit celebration of identity and objected to the erection of the board. But, the Bhim Army intervened and ensure that the Thakurs did not unleash any violence. In another incident, the Rajputs prevented a Dalit groom from riding a horse to his wedding. Yet again, the Bhim Army intervened and escorted the groom.

The Bhim Army attained national prominence after clashes in Uttar Pradesh. In June 2017, the group's leader Chandrashekhar, a lawyer, was arrested by the Uttar Pradesh Special Task Force. Chandrashekhar was granted bail by the Allahabad High Court in November 2017, but the Uttar Pradesh government led by Yogi Adityanath continued to detain him under the National Security Act until it dropped the NSA order in September 2018 and acquitted Chandrashekhar from jail. Chandrashekhar describes himself as a representative of Dalit identity and a follower of Kanshi Ram.

The group protests against discrimination and caste violence against Dalit by members of the upper Thakurs caste in violent clashes in 2017 in Saharanpur. Bhim Army rally in Jantar Mantar, New Delhi in 2017 was attended by a large crowd, estimated to be 10,000 by Delhi Police.

In August 2019, the Bhim Army took part in nationwide Dalit protests against the demolition of Shri Guru Ravidas Gurughar, a temple dedicated to Sant Ravidas in Tughlaqabad, Delhi, on the orders of the Delhi Development Authority (DDA), following lengthy litigation between the DDA and Guru Ravidas Jainti Samaroh Samiti. Dozens of people, including Chandrashekhar and Vinay Ratan, were arrested by police, prompting the Bhim Army to demand their release.

In March 2020, Chandrashekhar announced that the Bhim Army would formally enter electoral politics. The group previously operated as a quasi-political force. Chandrashekhar stated that "We tried to join hands and work unitedly with the Bahujan Samaj Party but its leader was unwilling to do so." Chandrashekhar said the new political party would set up an office in Lucknow and work to counter the ruling BJP. Chandrashekhar has described the BJP as his chief political adversary, but has also competed with Mayawati, the leader of the Bahujan Samaj Party.

The Bhim Army opposes the BJP's Citizenship (Amendment) Act, 2019 (CAA) legislation In January and February 2020, the Bhim Army engaged in the protests against the CAA and sought its repeal. In February 2020, street clashes took place between pro-CAA BJP supporters and Bhim Army supporters in connection with the North East Delhi riots; both sides engaged in stone-pelting.

== See also ==
- Bhim Sena
- Mayawati
- List of Jatav
- Chamar
- Kanshi Ram
