= Om Kumar =

Indian politician

Member of the Uttar Pradesh legislative assembly
- Incumbent
- Assumed office March 2012
- Preceded by: constituency created
- Constituency: Nehtaur

Personal details
- Born: 5 July 1969 (age 57) Bijnor district, Uttar Pradesh
- Citizenship: India
- Party: Bharatiya Janata Party
- Profession: Businessperson, politician

Om Kumar is an Indian politician and he is a member of the 18th Legislative Assembly and has earlier been part of the 17th Legislative Assembly and 16th Assembly of Uttar Pradesh India. He represents the Nehtaur constituency of Uttar Pradesh and is a member of the Bharatiya Janata Party political party.

== Early life and education ==
Om Kumar was born in Bijnor district, Uttar Pradesh. He received education till twelfth grade. Om Kumar belongs to the SC category and belongs to the dalit community. Before being elected as MLA, he used to work as a businessperson.

== Political career ==
Om Kumar has been a MLA for three-terms. He represents the Nehtaur constituency and is a member of the Bhartiya Janta Party political party. In 2017 elections, he defeated his close Indian National Congress candidate Munnalal Premi by a margin of 23,151 votes. In 2022 elections, he defeated his close Rashtriya Lok Dal candidate Munsi Ram by a margin of 258 votes.

== Posts held ==
#	From	To	Position	Comments
01	March 2012	March 2017	Member, 16th Legislative Assembly	
02	March 2017	March 2022	Member, 17th Legislative Assembly	
03	March 2022	Incumbent	Member, 18th Uttar Pradesh Assembly	

== See also ==
- Nehtaur
- Uttar Pradesh Legislative Assembly
- Government of India
- Politics of India
- Bahujan Samaj Party
