= Saharanpur violence =

Caste based violence between Dalit and Rajput communities in Uttar Pradesh, India

2017 Saharanpur violence
- Date: April–May 2017
- Location: Saharanpur, Uttar Pradesh, India; 29.30°N 77.21°E
- Caused by: Protest against Maharana Pratap's procession

Casualties
- Deaths: 2 (One Rajput and One Dalit)
- Injuries: 16
- Location in Uttar Pradesh

The Saharanpur violence was a dispute in April–May 2017 between the Dalit and Rajput communities.

== Violence ==
There had been an incidence of trouble between the Dalit and Thakur Rajput communities on 20 April 2017 when the Dalits were celebrating the birth anniversary of B. R. Ambedkar. On 5 May 2017, a group of Rajputs entered into dalit colony when they were on their way to a garlanding ceremony in honour of Maharana Pratap in spite of denial by administration to enter this colony and on this occasion the violence escalated, resulting in death of one rajput, several injuries and the burning of as many as 25 Dalit houses. The Dalits claimed that the 20-25 strong Rajput group was an unauthorised procession. Security forces were subsequently deployed to monitor the locality.

== Aftermath ==
An attempt by Dalits to protest on 9 May in Gandhi Park against the troubles was denied permission by city authorities, leading to more violence as the people turned instead to the streets. It was alleged that the Dalit protestors set fire to a police base and various vehicles. Subsequently, on 22 May, around 5000 Dalits peacefully protested at Jantar Mantar, led by the Bhim Army. Organisers later claimed that the actual attendance was around 1500-2000 people.

On the same day as the Jantar Mantar event, 180 families from Rupdi, Kapurpur, Ighri and Unali villages near Shabbirpur protested by immersing Hindu worshipping elements in a river and converting to Buddhism. They claimed that Hinduism did not give them equal status.

Raj Babbar, an Indian National Congress politician, later said that the "UP government failed to protect victims of caste-based violence". The Dalit leader Mewani said, "When the procession was being taken out, preventive measures should have been taken by the police and the administration. But nothing of the sort was done. And now Dalits are being targeted and are being hunted down. It is evident that CM Yogi and PM Modi want to replace the Constitution with Manusmriti."

Violence broke out again between Dalits and Thakurs on 23 May 2017 at three different places. One Dalit was killed.
