= Girish Chandra =

Girish Chandra (also spelled as Girishchandra) is a masculine Hindu name in India which means "moon of Shiva".

People with the given name include:

- Girish Chandra (politician), Former MP
- Girish Chandra Bose, Bengali educator and botanist
- Girish Chandra Ghosh, Bengali theater artist
- Girish Chandra Gupta, Bengali judge
- Girish Chandra Murmu, Santali civil servant
- Girish Chandra Roy, Bengali philanthropist
- Girish Chandra Saxena, former governor of Jammu and Kashmir state in India
- Girish Chandra Sen, Bengali Brahmo Samaj missionary
- Girish Chandra Tripathi, Indian vice chancellor
- Girish Chandra Yadav, Indian minister

== See also ==
- Girish
- Chandra (disambiguation)
