= Bijnor Lok Sabha constituency =

Constituency of the Indian parliament in Uttar Pradesh

Coordinates: 29.38°N 78.14°E

Bijnor UP-4
- Lok Sabha constituency
- Interactive Map Outlining Bijnor Lok Sabha constituency

Constituency details
- Country: India
- Region: North India
- State: Uttar Pradesh
- Assembly constituencies: Purqazi; Meerapur; Bijnor; Chandpur; Hastinapur
- Established: 1952-present
- Total electors: 17,38,387
- Reservation: None

Member of Parliament
- 18th Lok Sabha
- Incumbent Chandan Chauhan
- Party: RLD
- Alliance: NDA
- Elected year: 2024

Bijnor Lok Sabha Constituency (Hindi pronunciation: [bɪd͡ʒ.n̪ɔːɾ]) is one of the 80 Lok Sabha (parliamentary) constituencies in Uttar Pradesh state in northern India.

== Vidhan Sabha segments ==
No	Name	District	Member	Party	2024 Lead
13	Purqazi (SC)	Muzaffarnagar	Anil Kumar	RLD	RLD
16	Meerapur	Muzaffarnagar	Mithlesh Pal	RLD	RLD
22	Bijnor	Bijnor	Suchi Chaudhary	BJP	SP
23	Chandpur	Bijnor	Swami Omvesh	SP	SP
45	Hastinapur (SC)	Meerut	Dinesh Khatik	BJP	RLD

== Members of Lok Sabha ==
Year	Member	Party
1952	Swami Ramanand Shastri	Indian National Congress
1957	Abdul Lateef Gandhi	Indian National Congress
1962	Prakash Vir Shastri	Independent
1967	Swami Ramanand Shastri	Indian National Congress
1971	Swami Ramanand Shastri	Indian National Congress
1974^	Ram Dayal	Indian National Congress
1977	Mahi Lal	Janata Party
1980	Mangal Ram Premi	Janata Party (Secular)
1984	Chowdhry Girdhari Lal	Indian National Congress
1985^	Meira Kumar	Indian National Congress
1989	Mayawati	Bahujan Samaj Party
1991	Mangal Ram Premi	Bharatiya Janata Party
1996	Mangal Ram Premi	Bharatiya Janata Party
1998	Omvati Devi	Samajwadi Party
1999	Sheesh Ram Singh Ravi	Bharatiya Janata Party
2004	Munshiram Singh	Rashtriya Lok Dal
2009	Sanjay Singh Chauhan	Rashtriya Lok Dal
2014	Bharatendra Singh	Bharatiya Janata Party
2019	Malook Nagar	Bahujan Samaj Party
2024	Chandan Chauhan	Rashtriya Lok Dal

^ by poll

== Election results ==
Vote share of Winning candidates
2024	39.48%
2019	50.91%
2014	45.92%
2009	34.57%
2004	42.74%
1999	30.40%
1998	37.09%
1996	36.49%
1991	47.21%
1989	37.96%
1985 (by-poll)	37.63%
1984	56.78%
1980	42.44%
1977	74.36%
1971	66.60%
1967	34.53%
1962	49.50%
1957	52.02%

=== 2024 ===
2024 Indian general election: Bijnor
Party	Candidate	Votes	%	±%
RLD	Chandan Chauhan	404,493	39.48	▲39.48
SP	Deepak Saini	366,985	35.94	▲35.94
BSP	Vijender Singh	218,986	21.38	▼29.63
NOTA	None of the Above	4,446	0.43	▲0.03
Majority		37,508	3.34	▼3.02
Turnout		1,024,432	58.93	▼7.29
RLD gain from BSP		Swing		

=== 2019 ===
2019 Indian general elections: Bijnor
Party	Candidate	Votes	%	±%
BSP	Malook Nagar	561,045	50.91	▲29.21
BJP	Bharatendra Singh	491,104	44.57	▼1.35
INC	Nasimuddin Siddiqui	25,833	2.34	▲2.34
NOTA	None of the Above	4,404	0.40	▼0.14
Margin of victory		69,941	6.34	▼13.07
Turnout		11,00,763	66.15	▼1.73
BSP gain from BJP		Swing		

=== 2014 ===
2014 Indian general elections: Bijnor
Party	Candidate	Votes	%	±%
BJP	Bharatendra Singh	4,86,913	45.92	▲45.92
SP	Shahnawaz Rana	2,81,139	26.51	▲19.29
BSP	Malook Nagar	2,30,124	21.70	▼8.85
RLD	P. Jaya Prada Nahata	24,348	2.30	▼32.27
PECP	Mohammad Moosa	15,801	1.49	▲1.49
NOTA	None of the Above	5,775	0.54	▲0.54
Margin of victory		2,05,774	19.41	▲15.39
Turnout		10,60,410	67.88	▲12.91
BJP gain from RLD		Swing	▲11.35	

=== 2009 ===
2009 Indian general election: Bijnor
Party	Candidate	Votes	%	±%
RLD	Sanjay Singh Chauhan	244,587	34.57	
BSP	Shahid Siddiqui	2,16,157	30.55	
INC	Saiduz Zaman	85,158	12.03	
NCP	Kartar Singh Bhadana	74,881	10.58	
SP	Yashvir Singh	51,079	7.22	
Independent	11 Independent Candidates	21,489	3.04	
Others	7 Other Party Candidates	14,239	2.00	
Majority		28,430	4.02	
Turnout				
RLD hold		Swing		

=== 2004 ===
2004 Indian general election: Bijnor
Party	Candidate	Votes	%	±%
RLD	Munshiram Singh	301,599	42.74	
BSP	Ghan Shyam Kharwar	2,21,424	31.37	
BJP	Sheeshram Singh Ravi	1,01,340	14.36	
INC	Jiraj Singh	32,396	4.59	
Independent	4 Independent Candidates	18,837	2.67	
Others	8 Other Party Candidates	30,141	4.27	
Majority		80,175	11.37	
Turnout				
Swing to RLD from BJP		Swing		

=== 1999 ===
1999 Indian general election: Bijnor
Party	Candidate	Votes	%	±%
BJP	Sheeshram Singh Ravi	214,266	30.40	
SP	Omvati Devi	1,90,566	27.03	
BSP	Veer Singh	1,83,676	26.06	
RLD	Mangal Ram Premi	88,994	12.62	
Independent	7 Independent Candidates	19,308	2.73	
Others	4 Other Party Candidates	8,115	1.16	
Majority		23,700	3.37	
Turnout				
Swing to BJP from SP		Swing		

=== 1998 ===
1998 Indian general election: Bijnor (SC)
Party	Candidate	Votes	%	±%
SP	Omvati Devi	282,612	37.09	
BJP	Mangal Ram Premi	2,73,400	35.88	
BSP	Munshiram Singh	1,80,005	23.62	
BKKGP	Surendra Singh	20,076	2.63	
Independent	Naubahar Singh	1,339	0.18	
Others	4 Other Party Candidates	4,536	1.40	
Majority		9,212	1.21	
Turnout		7,67,498	61.06	
Swing to SP from BJP		Swing		

=== 1996 ===
1996 Indian general election: Bijnor (SC)
Party	Candidate	Votes	%	±%
BJP	Mangal Ram Premi	220,806	36.49	
SP	Satish Kumar	1,93,389	31.96	
BSP	Chetan Swaroop	1,57,339	26.00	
INC	Banwari Lal	6,117	1.01	
Independent	16 Independent Candidates	18,211	3.00	
Others	6 Other Party Candidates	9,275	1.54	
Majority		27,417	4.53	
Turnout				
BJP hold		Swing		

=== 1991 ===
1991 Indian general election: Bijnor (SC)
Party	Candidate	Votes	%	±%
BJP	Mangal Ram Premi	247,465	47.21	
BSP	Mayawati	1,59,731	30.47	
CPI(M)	Ram Sarup	57,880	11.04	
INC	Aasha Chaudhary	39,738	7.58	
JP	Dharam Pal Singh	5,595	1.07	
DDP	Jaipal Singh	991	0.19	
Independent	8 Independent Candidates	12,744	2.43	
Majority		87,734	16.74	
Turnout		5,39,018	57.49	
Swing to BJP from BSP		Swing		

=== 1989 ===
1989 Indian general election: Bijnor (SC)
Party	Candidate	Votes	%	±%
BSP	Mayawati	183,189	37.96	
JD	Mangal Ram Premi	1,74,310	36.12	
INC	Aasha Chaudhary	1,01,718	21.08	
DDP	Jaipal Singh	2,179	0.45	
Independent	7 Independent Candidates	21,222	4.40	
Majority		8,879	1.84	
Turnout		4,98,547	53.83	
Swing to BSP from INC		Swing		

=== 1985 by-election ===
1985 Bijnor Lok Sabha by-election: Bijnor (SC)
Party	Candidate	Votes	%	±%
INC	Meira Kumar	128,086	37.63	
LKD	Ram Vilas Paswan	1,22,747	36.06	
BSP	Mayawati	61,504	18.07	
Independent	A. Swarup	13,766	4.04	
Independent	C. Bhan	3,684	1.08	
Independent	H. Govind	3,249	0.95	
Independent	R. Lal	1,850	0.54	
Independent	Kanti	1,583	0.46	
Independent	A. P. Alias P. D. Gautam	1,442	0.42	
Independent	S. R. Singh	1,337	0.39	
Independent	J. Saran	1,152	0.34	
Majority		5,339	1.57	
Turnout				
INC hold		Swing		

=== 1984 ===
1984 Indian general election: Bijnor (SC)
Party	Candidate	Votes	%	±%
INC	Girdhar Lal	219,185	56.78	
LKD	Mangal Ram Premi	1,19,372	30.92	
Independent	Sheesh Ram Singh	12,229	3.17	
Independent	Valbeer Singh	9,946	2.58	
DDP	Jagdish Saran	6,437	1.67	
Independent	4 Independent Candidates	18,839	4.88	
Majority		99,813	25.86	
Turnout		3,95,079	54.44	
Swing to INC from JP(S)		Swing		

=== 1980 ===
1980 Indian general election: Bijnor (SC)
Party	Candidate	Votes	%	±%
JP(S)	Mangal Ram Premi	145,514	42.44	
JP	Mahi Lal	99,415	28.99	
INC(I)	Babu Ram	74,241	21.65	
Independent	Mehar Singh Pushan	9,977	2.91	
Independent	Kanehya	6,282	1.83	
Independent	Ajaib Singh	4,399	1.28	
Independent	Daya Ram	3,043	0.89	
Majority		46,099	13.45	
Turnout		3,50,199	51.59	
Swing to JP(S) from JP		Swing		

=== 1977 ===
1977 Indian general election: Bijnor (SC)
Party	Candidate	Votes	%	±%
JP	Mahi Lal	258,663	74.36	
INC	Ram Dayal	62,849	18.07	
Independent	8 Independent Candidates	26,321	7.56	
Majority		1,95,814	56.29	
Turnout		3,53,959	59.54	
Swing to JP from INC		Swing		

=== 1971 ===
1971 Indian general election: Bijnor (SC)
Party	Candidate	Votes	%	±%
INC	Swami Ramanand Shastri	144,728	66.60	
BKD	Mahi Lal	40,900	18.82	
INC(O)	Parwati Chaudhary	25,548	11.76	
SWA	Mangoo Singh	6,143	2.83	
Majority		1,03,828	47.78	
Turnout		2,23,152	43.07	
INC hold		Swing		

=== 1967 ===
1967 Indian general election: Bijnor (SC)
Party	Candidate	Votes	%	±%
INC	S. R. Nand	103,874	34.53	
ABJS	S. Ram	71,093	23.64	
Independent	B. Lal	36,664	12.19	
Independent	B. C. Singh	29,146	9.69	
Independent	Manphool	21,828	7.26	
SWA	M. Singh	19,797	6.58	
RPI	M. S. Pushan	13,006	4.32	
Independent	H. Singh	5,374	1.79	
Majority		32,781	10.89	
Turnout		3,23,835	66.74	
Swing to INC from Independent		Swing		

=== 1962 ===
1962 Indian general election: Bijnor
Party	Candidate	Votes	%	±%
Independent	Prakash Vir Shastri	125,777	49.50	
INC	Abdul Lateef	76,584	30.14	
ABJS	Shiv Ram	26,182	10.31	
Independent	Mohd. Yaseen	10,399	4.09	
Independent	Kishan Lal	9,251	3.64	
RPI	Sant Ram	5,877	2.31	
Majority		49,193	19.36	
Turnout		2,69,931	67.41	
Swing to Independent from INC		Swing		

=== 1957 ===
1957 Indian general election: Bijnor
Party	Candidate	Votes	%	±%
INC	Abdul Lateef	123,181	52.02	
ABJS	Bhudeo Singh	84,173	35.54	
PSP	Dhal Gopal Singh	29,463	12.44	
Majority		39,008	16.48	
Turnout		2,36,817	59.68	
INC hold		Swing		

== See also ==
- Bijnor district
- List of constituencies of the Lok Sabha
