= Hafiz Mohamad Ibrahim =

Indian politician (1889–1968)

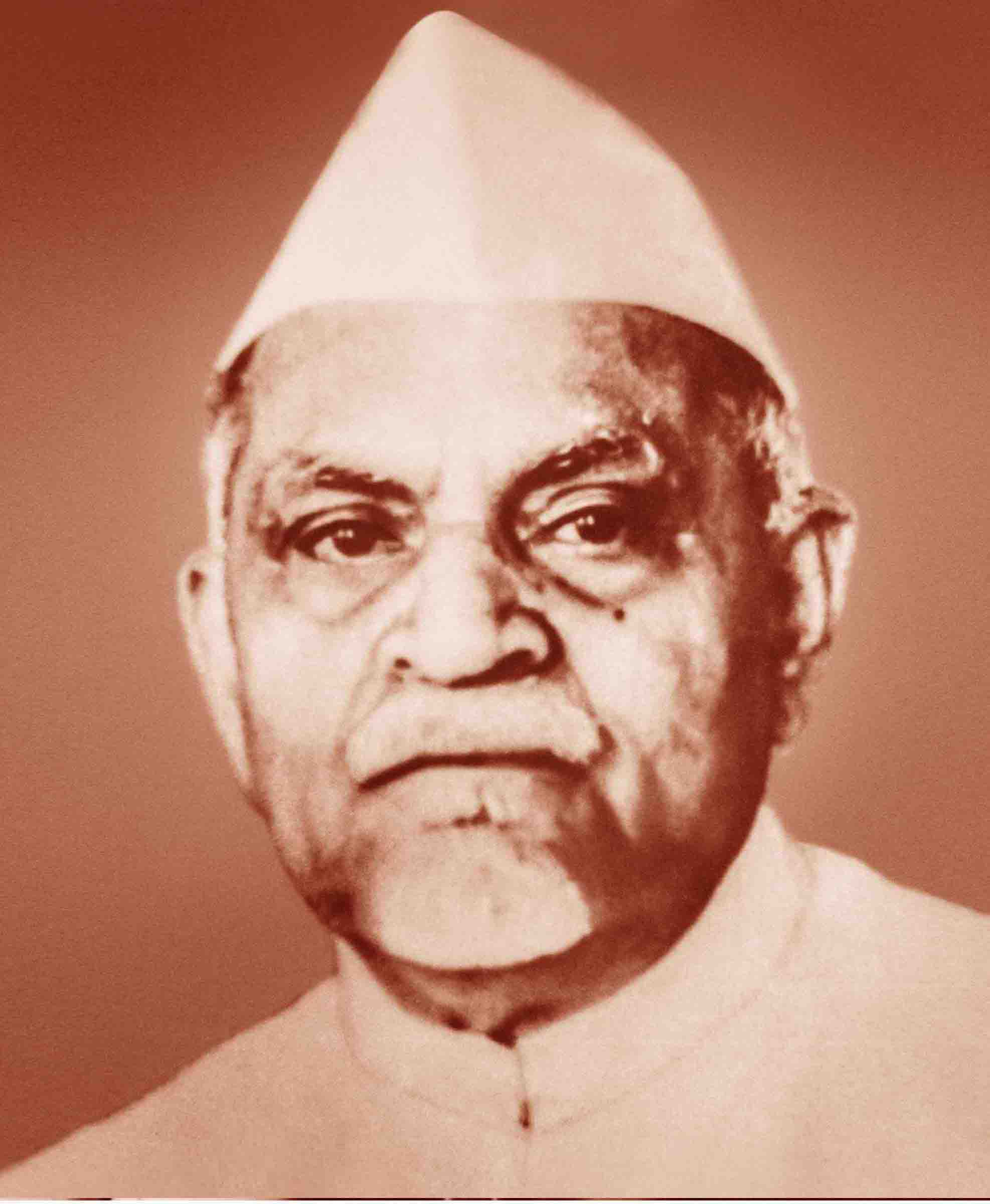
Ibrahim in 1964

Hafiz Mohamad Ibrahim, also spelled as Hafiz Muhammad Ibrahim (14 August 1889 - 24 January 1968), was a leader of Indian National Congress.

He was governor of Punjab, India in 1965. Ibrahim was a member of Rajya Sabha from 1958 to 1962 and served as union minister of power and irrigation. He was leader of the Rajya Sabbha from 1961 to 1963.

He served as Communication and Irrigation minister for United Provinces (1937–50).

== Personal and Education life ==
Born at Mohalla Qazi Sarai 1st in Nagina in 1888, Hafiz Ibrahim was educated at Rajkiya Diksha Vidyalaya and joined Aligarh Muslim University for higher studies.

His son Atiqur Rahman represented Nagina (Assembly constituency) 4th and 5th Legislative Assembly of Uttar Pradesh, serving from March 1967 to March 1974.

His another son Azizur Rahman was a four-time MLA, Rehman was a minister in the state four times. He represented Bijnor (Assembly constituency) 06th Legislative Assembly of Uttar Pradesh 08th Legislative Assembly of Uttar Pradesh and 09th Legislative Assembly of Uttar Pradesh In office Mar 1974 Nov 1989.

== Career ==
Ibrahim also was a student leader and was elected as union secretary at AMU. In 1919, he joined the independence movement. After joining Congress he was a delegate at the Nagpur convention.

In the 1937 elections, due to differences of opinion between the Muslim League and the Congress, he joined the Congress and then achieved great heights in politics.

Later, during the 1942 movement, he was arrested and sent to Fatehgarh Jail.

After independence. Ibrahim was a member of the Rajya Sabha and became a cabinet minister in Nehru's ministry in 1958. He held important portfolios as irrigation, waqf, PWD, food and civil supplies. During this period he was instrumental in shaping the waqf act.

Later he played important role in the Sindhu river dispute between India and Pakistan. He was also behind according university status to Roorkee Engineering College. He also organised a convention of Muslim MPs and MLAs in Lucknow. He became Governor of Punjab in 1966. The convention was conceptualised with the help of his trusted friend Nirmal Chandra Chaturvedi, MLC.

== Death ==
Ibrahim died during medical treatment on 24 January 1968.
