= 2016 Bijnor Violence =

Religious riot in Bijnor, India

On 16th after Eid al-Adha September 2016 Communal tension has erupted in Bijnor, Uttar Pradesh after a fight between two communities on Friday. In this incident, 4 people have died due to gunshot while a dozen people were injured. During the uproar over molestation, there was heavy firing and stone pelting between the two sides. UP Police ADG (Law and Order) Daljit Chaudhary has reached the spot. On 16 September 2016, 3 people of one side were killed in the firing in the case of molestation of a girl in Peda village. After the communal dispute, the police had made 27 people accused including BJP MLA Suchi (politician) husband Mausam Chaudhary. The High Court ordered the withdrawal of the cases against Mausam Chaudhary due to lack of evidence

== Background ==
On 16 September 2016, Peda Urf Murtajapur Bulaki village of City Kotwali area was engulfed in communal fire due to molestation of a girl. People of two communities came face to face. People of one community shot Ahsan, his brother Anisuddin and nephew Sarfaraz of the same family dead with licensed guns and rifles. People of the neighboring village also got involved in this dispute. There was stone pelting between the two sides. In this incident, 12 people of the deceased side were injured. Communal tension was created in the area due to this incident. Top officials were in a fix due to this incident. Officials from Lucknow had to camp in Pedda. In this case, a report was filed against Sansar Singh, his son Nitin, Raju, Pappan, Naresh, Tikam Singh, his son Tejpal, Koman, Pankaj, Anuj, Satish, Malkhan, Prem, Billu, Rinku, Sonu, Kakku, Ompal, Rajpal, Anil Kumar, Manoj, Tishu, Akash resident of Pedda, Kachpura head Dilawar Singh, his son Bittan, Nayagaon resident Kunwar Sen, Billu and two home guards. Later, the names of BJP leader and current BJP MLA Suchi Chaudhary's husband Aishwarya Chaudhary, businessman Arun Kabadi and village Faridpur Bhogi resident Kartik were also added in the report. Almost all the accused are behind bars

== Reactions ==
Asaduddin Owaisi and the editor of Jamiat Ulema Hind gave their respective Arshad Madani and Mahmood Madani stand regarding this riot but Akhilesh government stopped Owaisi in Pada village so that the riot does not increase further
