= Mufti Shamoon Qasmi =

Indian politician

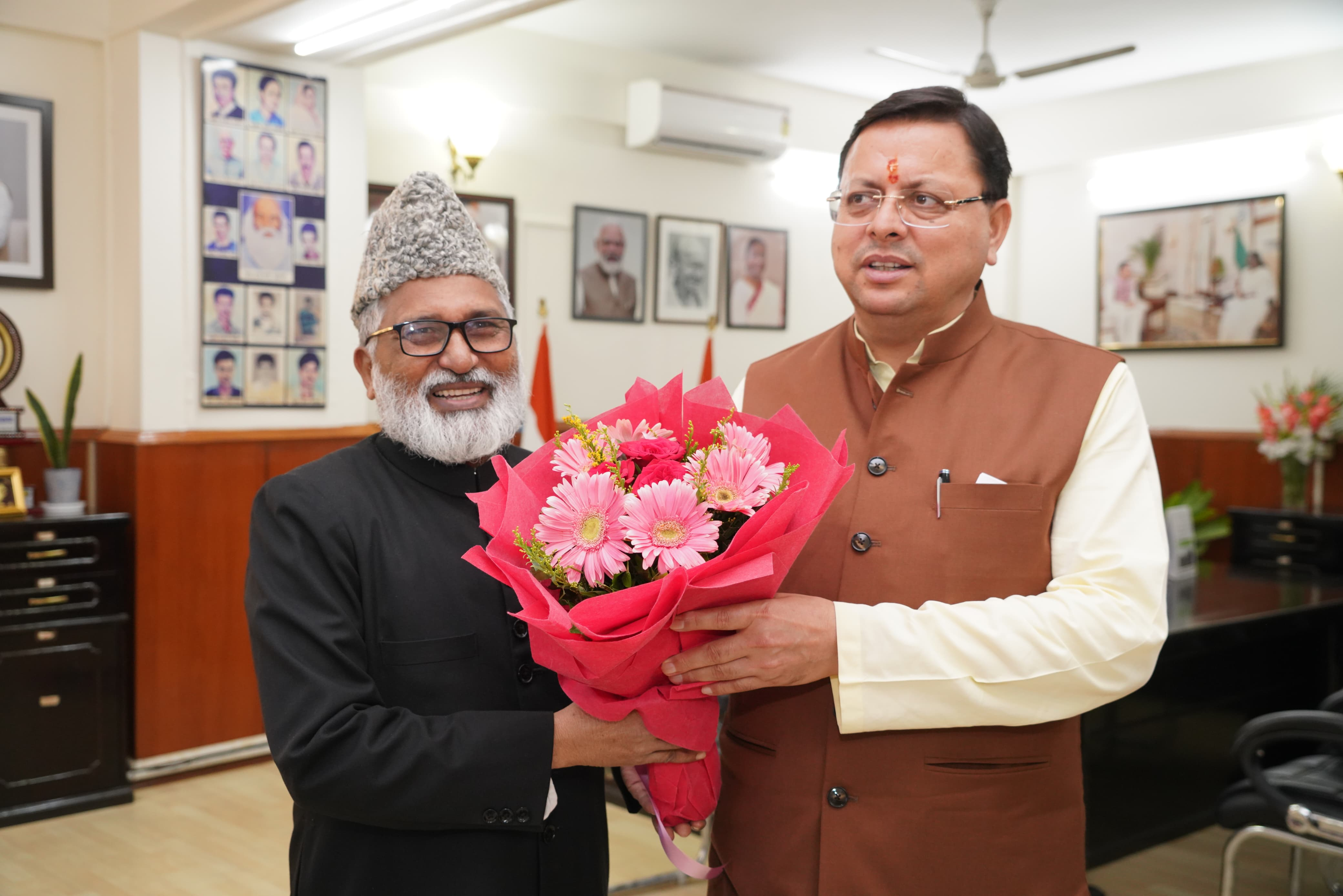

Cabinet Minister in Uttarakhand

Personal details
- Born: 25 May 1967 (age 59) Bijnor
- Party: Bhartiya Janata Party
- Occupation: Politician

Mufti Shamoon Qasmi (born 25 May 1967 in Bijnor) is an Indian politician who is a Cabinet minister of Uttarakhand and chairman of Uttarakhand Madarsa board education. He is also a member of the Bharatiya Janata Party.

He worked for AIDS prevention under the banner of UNAIDS. and member of Aligarh Muslim University Madarasa Board.

== Achievements ==
- Campaigned to eliminate social evils like female foeticide.
- Worked with the Art for Living Institute.
- Worked with the Bharat Swabhiman Organisation
