= Sheeshram Singh Ravi =

Indian politician

Member of 13th Lok Sabha
- In office 1999–2004
- Preceded by: Omvati Devi
- Succeeded by: Munshiram Singh
- Constituency: Bijnor Lok Sabha constituency

Personal details
- Born: 19 January 1953 (age 73) Bijnor district, Uttar Pradesh
- Spouse: Krishna Ravi
- Parent(s): Bhikha Singh (father) and Durgiya Devi (mother)

Sheeshram Singh Ravi is an Indian politician who served as Member of 13th Lok Sabha from Bijnor Lok Sabha constituency from 1999 to 2004. He is from Bharatiya Janata Party.

== Personal life ==
He was born on 19 January 1953 to Bhikka Singh and Durgiya Devi in Bijnor district. He married Krishna Ravi on 4 May 1971.
