= Baghdad Ansar =

Village in Uttar Pradesh, India

Baghdad Ansar is a village around 3.5 km from Dhampur of District Bijnor in Uttar Pradesh State.
