= Ruchi Veera =

Indian politician

Member of Parliament, Lok Sabha
- Incumbent
- Assumed office 4 June 2024
- Preceded by: S. T. Hasan
- Constituency: Moradabad
- Majority: 1,05,762

Member of Uttar Pradesh Legislative Assembly
- In office Sep 2014 – Mar 2017
- Preceded by: Kunwar Bhartendra Singh
- Succeeded by: Suchi Chaudhary
- Constituency: Bijnor

Personal details
- Born: 2 September 1961 (age 65) Hasanpur, Uttar Pradesh, India
- Party: Samajwadi Party
- Other political affiliations: Bahujan Samaj Party
- Relations: Kunwar Satya Vir Father in law
- Education: Hindu College, Moradabad, Mahatama Jyotiba Phule Rohilkhand University

Ruchi Veera (Hindi pronunciation: [ɾʊt͡ʃɪ ʋiːɾaː]) is an Indian politician and current Member of Parliament of Lok Sabha from Moradabad. She is former member of the 16th Legislative Assembly of Uttar Pradesh of India. She represented the Bijnor constituency of Uttar Pradesh and is a member of the Samajwadi Party.

== Early life and education ==
Ruchi Vira was born in Hasanpur, Distt.-JP Nagar, Uttar Pradesh. She holds Bachelor of Arts degree from Mahatama Jyotiba Phule Rohilkhand University. She is from Vaishya community.

== Political career ==
Ruchi Vira won the 2024 General Election from 06- Moradabad Constituency of Uttar Pradesh on Samajwadi Party's Symbol. Ruchi Veera defeated BJP candidate Sarvesh Singh by about 1.05 lakh votes. She is considered close to SP leader Azam Khan lobby. (Samajwadi Party fielded Ruchi Vira by cutting the ticket of Dr S. T. Hasan lobby and the result was that Ruchi Vira won the election by 1.05 lakh votes.)

Ruchi Vira was Zila Panchayat Adhyaksh from 2005 to 2007. Ruchi Vira has been a MLA from Bijnor Sadar for one term in 2014-2017 . She represents the Bijnor constituency and is a member of the Samajwadi Party. Vira was elected as MLA during the by-election after the sitting MLA Kunwar Bhartendra Singh got elected to 16th Lok Sabha.

She lost her seat in the 2017 Uttar Pradesh Assembly election to Suchi Chaudhary of the Bharatiya Janata Party. Veera joined Bahujan Samaj Party.

- Candidate MP Aonla, Bareilly, Vira was loser

In 2022 Uttar Pradesh Legislative Assembly election she lost the fight and Suchi from BJP won as candidate MLA Bijnor (Assembly constituency).

In 2024 Lok Sabha Election Vira won as MP Moradabad Lok Sabha constituency.

== Posts Held ==
#	From	To	Position	Party
01	2005	2007	Zila Panchayat Adhyaksh	Samajwadi Party
02	2014	Mar-2017	Member, 16th Legislative Assembly	Samajwadi Party
03	2024	2029	Member, 18th Loksabha	Samajwadi Party

== See also ==
- Bijnor
- Moradabad
- Government of India
- Politics of India
- Samajwadi Party
- Uttar Pradesh Legislative Assembly
