= Bharatendra Singh =

Indian politician

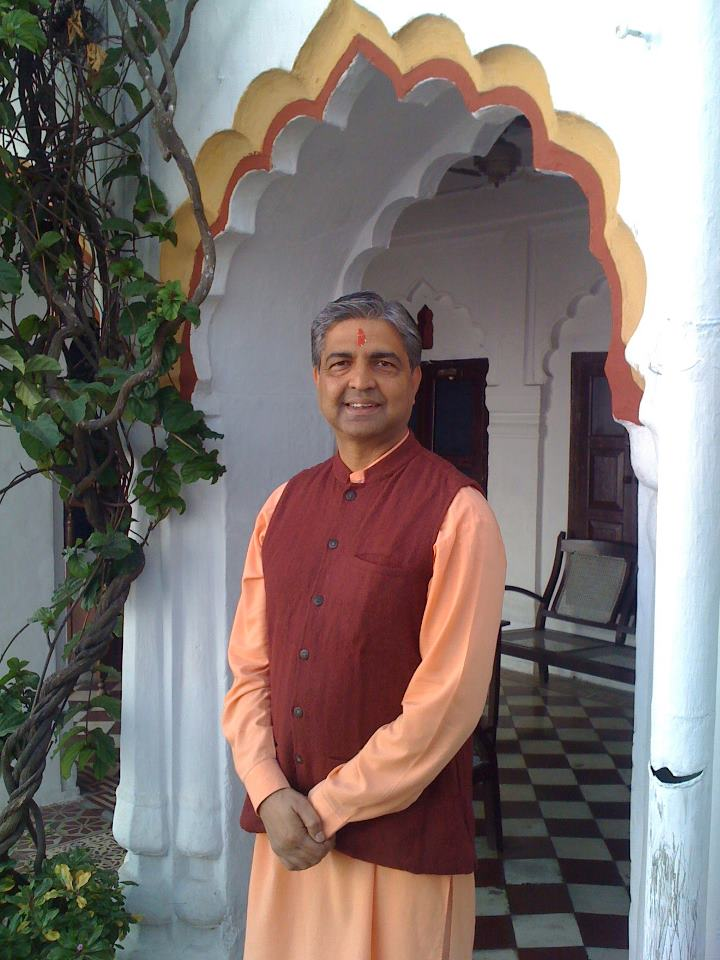

Member of Parliament, Lok Sabha
- In office 16 May 2014 – 23 May 2019
- Preceded by: Sanjay Singh Chauhan
- Succeeded by: Malook Nagar
- Constituency: Bijnor

Member of Uttar Pradesh Legislative Assembly
- In office 2012–2014
- Preceded by: Shahnawaz Rana
- Succeeded by: Ruchi Veera
- Constituency: Bijnor
- In office 2002–2007
- Preceded by: Raja Gazaffar
- Succeeded by: Shahnawaz
- Constituency: Bijnor

Personal details
- Born: Kunwar Bharatendra Singh; 14 January 1964 (age 62) Dehradun, Uttarakhand
- Party: Bharatiya Janata Party
- Spouse: Saloni Randhawa (div)
- Children: 3
- Education: The Doon School, St. Stephen's College, Delhi
- As of 6 March, 2022

Kunwar Bharatendra Singh is an Indian politician. He was a member of Uttar Pradesh Legislative Assembly elected from Bijnor as a candidate of the Bharatiya Janata Party. He was also a member of the 16th Lok Sabha, representing the Bijnor Lok Sabha constituency after being elected in 2014. Singh lost in the 2019 Lok Sabha election.

== Early life and education ==
Kunwar Bharatendra Singh was born on 14 January 1964 to Devendra Singh and Anjali D. Singh in Dehradun, Uttar Pradesh (now in Uttarakhand). Singh is a member of the former royal family of Sahanpur. He was educated at Doon School, Dehradun and received his B.A. (Hons.) in History from St. Stephen's College, Delhi.

== Political career ==
Singh is a member of the Bharatiya Janata Party (BJP). He was a member of Uttar Pradesh Legislative Assembly for two terms- from 2002 to 2007 and 2012 to 2014. Singh was the Minister of State, Irrigation, Government of Uttar Pradesh from 2002 to 2003 and from 2012 to 2014, he acted as the whip for BJP in the state assembly.

In May 2014, he was elected to the 16th Lok Sabha representing Bijnor Lok Sabha constituency seat for BJP. He lost in the 2019 Lok Sabha election.

Singh was covered in the news and linked to controversies as an accused in the Muzaffarnagar riots. He was also issued a notice by the Allahabad High Court on an election petition filed by Rajendra Kumar. In January 2015, Singh was elected to the Court of Aligarh Muslim University.

On 3 October 2015, Singh and residents of Vidurkuti village raided an illegal sand mining site along the Ganga river, forcing the miners to flee. In March 2019, an effigy of Singh was burnt in Mawana Khurd and people held black flags and protested while alleging no visit from the Member of Parliament in the region and no development of the area in the past five years.

== Personal life ==
Singh was married to Saloni Randhawa, with whom he has a two daughters and a son. He is an agriculturalist by profession.
