= 1990 Bijnor riot =

Religious riot in Bijnor, India

In October 1990, a major communal riot took place in Bijnor, a town in the state of Uttar Pradesh, India. Stemming from a celebratory procession by local Hindu groups, it was the most destructive riot in the wake of concurrent Hindu nationalist campaigns, which eventually led to the demolition of Babri Masjid. The riots were also characterized by phases of passive and active complicity of the state machinery.

Official estimates put the death toll at 87; unofficially, the count varies from around 200 to 300 with most of the dead being Muslims.

== Background ==
Amrita Basu et al. notes that there was a near-total absence of any communal riots at Bijnor before 1988. A few distinct events manifested across the politico-religious sphere in the following years, that led to the gradual build-up of animosity and served as a precursor to the riots.

=== Municipal elections ===
In the 1988 municipal elections, a Muslim lawyer - Zafar Khan, from BSP was elected as the chair, having defeated Sandip Lal, a fellow Hindu contender from BSP, who was also backed by BJP. Effectively, it was more of a religious fight than a political once. Notwithstanding the demographic skew against Hindus, Lal was poorly educated and corrupt (contra Khan) and his history of switching political allegiances drastically hampered his chances; the election also saw a lower voter turnout among Hindus.

Soon enough, the elected Hindus in the council (most of whom were prominent faces of communal outfits) accused Khan of being partisan in the distribution of funds and appointments at key posts including Vice Chairman, which was traditionally allotted to the opposition. The claims of fund misuse and partisan appointments have since been located to be entirely unfounded; a Muslim was illegally installed as the Vice Chairman, in absence of Khan, via a conspiracy hatched by the Hindu councilors.

Along while, there were multiple attempts to bring a no-confidence motion against Khan especially by weaponizing the nominated members, but none managed to succeed especially that he was close to Mulayam Yadav, the then-chief minister from BSP (who changed nominated members at will). The last such attempt was in June 1990.

=== Property dispute ===
In around July 1990, there was a huge fracas about the fate of vacant land adjoining a mosque.

The Hindu councilors along with local members of RSS claimed that the property belonged to a Hindu, who was settled elsewhere but failed to pay taxes. On notification by the municipality of pending usurpation, he did pay the dues but yet Khan had evicted him to unilaterally allot the property to a Muslim, who was supposedly planning to inaugurate a beef shop. A local daily, The Bijnor Times, (which was promised with favors by Lal, shall he were elected) heavily aided in the amplification, so as to discredit Khan. The allegations were unfounded in that the municipality owned the land, since long back and there was only a single request for renting out the property, which the entire council had approved of.

On 25 August, a group of Hindus, led by Bajrang Dal, occupied the property and were soon reinforced in large numbers, as rumors spread of an impending attack by Muslims. After a bout of stone-pelting between the communities, local police vacated the property by force and arrested the agitating Hindus. An old Muslim woman was killed by a ricocheting bullet and another Muslim died in the hospital, later. In light of the volatile situation, the municipality temporally stalled the scheduled land-allocation, in what was conceived as a victory by the Hindus.

=== Ram-jyotis ===
In the wake to the Babri Masjid demolition, VHP organised a cross-state tour, wherein karsevaks went about in a procession with flame-torches and sought to rekindle the Hindu spirit. The then BSP government chose to prohibit them from entering the town by installing a barricade over the lone entry-bridge, fearing communal disturbances.

In response, thousands of Hindu women formed into a flash mob, stormed the bridge in active defiance of state orders, and enabled the Ram-jyotis into the town. This proved to be a major turning point as to the inclusion of women in physical manifestations of Hindu nationalism, and for the female-inflicted violence, that would form a major part of the Bijnor riot.

=== Communal harmony rally ===
The relations further deteriorated when the-then chief minister Mulayam Singh Yadav held one of the many 'communal-harmony rally' at Bijnor on 9 October 1990. Poised as an antidote to RSS-BJP processions in the wake of Ayodhya, it was widely attended by Muslims from across nearby districts. Incidentally, Lal was the chief organiser, whilst Khan chose to boycott it, fearing a flare-up of tensions.

In the speech, Mulayam vowed to protect the Babri Masjid and spoke about unity between Muslim and Backward Classes against Savarna Hindus. The speech was perceived to be inflammatory by Hindus and widespread violence followed soon afterward. Muslims were heckled to prevent attending the rally and their vehicles were attacked, whilst returning during night; effigies of Mulayam were burnt by a combine of BJP and ShivSena, as well. The district president of VHP was attacked, in what has been since alluded to an internal conspiracy for the sake of rumor-mongering, by local intelligence agencies.

Three people (two Hindus and one Muslim) died and thirty shops were subject to loot and arson, in the aftermaths; bomb blasts were frequently heard around the town and the local marketplace was closed for four days. Ninety-five people (sixty-five Hindus and thirty Muslims) were arrested but soon released due to continuous protests by the Hindu populace, who accused the authorities of minority appeasement.

== Riot ==
=== Course ===
==== Build up ====
The initial destruction of Babri Masjid was planned on 30 October 1990. The karsevaks started to arrive by 25th and pursuant to instructions of Mulayam Yadav, were subject to mass-incarcerations; by 26th, 637 were already arrested and that local prisons were filled up, a girls' intermediate college was transformed to a temporary prison. Securities at the latter facility were minimal and they wandered out to the town, with ease.

Schools and colleges chose to announce indefinite closure, in light of the communally polarized environment. Public assemblies were banned soon afterwards.

==== Immediate trigger ====
On 30 October, the detained karsevaks assembled at an Arya Samaj temple, in the town square with local VHP members, in anticipation of the demolition. At around 11 a.m., a police officer reached the temple and spread misleading news, supposedly referenced from BBC, about the procession having reached Ayodhya and started with the planned destruction. Within an hour, a several-hundred strong victory procession made its way through a Muslim locality of the town and engaged in provocative sloganeering; the slogans were strikingly similar to those used in previous communal riots. Local Hindus however, rejected the claims and asserted of singing devotional songs, only. The administration did not choose to not pay any heed to multiple calls for action on the initial congregation, which was a violation of the imposed prohibition on public assembly or on preventing its passage through the Muslim quarters.

Amidst this volatile atmosphere, a local Muslim doctor – Mushir Ahmed – chose to keep open his dispensary. After the Muslims started pelting stones at the Hindu rally; Ahmed chose to shelter a few Hindu women at the forefront of the rally, who were caught in the cross-fire. The Hindus in the rally however suspected Ahmed of abducting those women, and he was murdered.

This served as the immediate basis for the riot that was to follow. As his dead body was taken back to home, the local Muslims attacked a Hindu neighborhood of Joggis, a lower caste among Hindus, and retaliation followed soon. By evening, 48 were killed.

==== Curfew and state-complicity ====
The state responded by declaring a town-wide curfew at around 1:30 AM on 31 October and deploying Provincial Armed Constabulary (PAC).

However, they were heavily partisan and effectively allowed the Hindus, to go on a rampage looting and burning down Muslim shops whilst restricting the Muslims to their houses; PAC later claimed of being accompanied Hindu nationalists, only as to their inability to maneuver in an alien territory. Basu notes that post the installation of a curfew, it was no longer a symmetric warfare but state-assisted and perpetrated mass-violence against Muslims, which continued unabated till 3 October. The-then editor of Dainik Jagran argues that the relatively one-sided violence perpetrated by Muslims in Bartwaan had de-professionalized the state-forces in entirety and raked in a communal mobocracy.

There were numerous instances of the PAC torturing, physically violating and executing Muslims, whilst accompanied by local Hindu residents. Looting and arsons of Muslim houses were extensively facilitated, as well. 5 mosques were destroyed, per local reports.

===== Spread =====
The riots were mostly restricted to urban Bijnor but sporadic bursts of violence were reported from some adjoining villages esp. in Rampur Bakli. Agricultural equipment et al. were destroyed, in addition to torture, rape and summary executions.

==== Closure ====
The entire city was handed over to the Army on 3 November, who finally reined in the riot. Curfew timings were gradually relaxed, before being withdrawn all-together after 10 days. During the span, outsiders, even the local legislator were not allowed in. By mid-November, normalcy was restored. Official estimates put the death-toll at 87; unofficially, the count varied from around 200 to 300.

=== Local media coverage ===
The local media (esp. Bijnor Times) were actively complicit in contributing to the proliferation of rumors and sustaining the riot, via mis-reporting and partisan editorializing. There was extensive pro-Hindu bias and the reporting during riots, were essentially Islamophobic.

Bijnor Times initially blamed the Muslims for stone-pelting on a peaceful procession by Hindus, and deemed the riots to be pre-planned by the local Muslim populace. It soon changed its narrative and alleged that outsiders had instigated the riots; this was also readily accepted by the local administration. The paper also inflated the death toll, on the side of Hindus and alleged police appeasement towards the Muslims.

== Aftermath ==
The entire administration was subject to a complete overhaul, soon. Pro-active policing was relied upon along with peace-building measures, to prevent any recurrence. The town has not been witness to any riot, since.

The next elections for state as well as national legislature were won by BJP with percentage-totals of 53 and 47 respectively.

== Analysis ==
The riot has been deemed to be the most destructive riot in the wake of concurrent Hindu nationalist campaigns.

Jeffery argues that the riots primarily arose from pre-existing negative stereotyping of Muslims by the Hindu populace which reached a tipping point around November 1990, guided by the broader political sentiments of militant Hindu mobilization under BJP and aggressive responses by the BSP government in state; once the riots started there was a cycle of retaliation, further confirmation of prejudices and further retaliation, effectively leading to an unchecked cycle of positive feedback. Jeffery failed to locate any standing in the economic sphere, though.

He noted that local explanations varied from claiming of the riot being organised and perpetuated in entirety by outsiders to blaming the local Muslims and Khan. All the sides commonly blamed the state machinery for adding to the riots, though. Some gave justifications based on intersection of caste and religion, as well. Jeffery did note that a combination of all these factors, contributed to the riots, as well.

Basu, however, argues that the causes ought be located in the intersection of social, political as well economic planes.

Almost all the Hindus interviewed by Basu, in the aftermath of the riots, squarely blamed Khan, for communalizing the regional politics and even instigating the riots, contrary to all available evidence. The political need of the Hindus to exert themselves in the local municipal council and thus, gain greater control over economy, aided in the manifestation of the riot. Khan's success in forging a Muslim+Lower-caste electoral base under BSP's aegis and transgression of rigid social boundaries, also hampered the social goal of BJP to subsume all Hindus under the fold of Hindutva, thus hampering larger political prospects in the region. This was since reflected in BJP playing integral roles in building up the volatile atmosphere up till the riots.
