= Nagina Assembly constituency =

Constituency of the Uttar Pradesh legislative assembly in India

Nagina
- Constituency No. 18 for the Uttar Pradesh Legislative Assembly

Constituency details
- Country: India
- Region: North India
- State: Uttar Pradesh
- District: Bijnor
- Total electors: 299,391 (2012)
- Reservation: SC

Member of Legislative Assembly
- 18th Uttar Pradesh Legislative Assembly
- Incumbent Manoj Kumar Paras
- Party: Samajwadi Party
- Elected year: 2022

Nagina Assembly constituency is one of the 403 constituencies of the Uttar Pradesh Legislative Assembly, India. It is a part of the Bijnor district and one of the five assembly constituencies in the Nagina Lok Sabha constituency. First election in this assembly constituency was held in 1957 after the delimitation order (DPACO - 1956) was passed in 1956. The constituency was assigned identification number 18 after "Delimitation of Parliamentary and Assembly Constituencies Order, 2008" was passed in the year 2008.

== Wards / Areas ==
Extent of Nagina Assembly constituency is KCs Akbarabad, Kiratpur & Kiratpur MB of Najibabad Tehsil; KC Nagina & Nagina MB of Nagina Tehsil.

== Members of the Legislative Assembly ==
Year	Member	Party
1957	Govind Sahai	Indian National Congress
1962	Govind Sahai	Indian National Congress
1967	Atiqur Rehman	Indian National Congress
1969	Atiqur Rehman	Indian National Congress
1974	Ganga Devi	Indian National Congress
1977	Mangal Ram Premi	Janata Party
1980	Bishan Lal	Indian National Congress
1985	Omwati Devi	Indian National Congress
1989	Rameshwari	Bahujan Samaj Party
1991	Om Prakash	Bharatiya Janata Party
1993	Satish Kumar	Janata Dal
1996	Omwati Devi	Samajwadi Party
2002	Omwati Devi	Samajwadi Party
2007	Omwati Devi	Bahujan Samaj Party
2012	Manoj Kumar Paras	Samajwadi Party
2017	Manoj Kumar Paras	Samajwadi Party
2022	Manoj Kumar Paras	Samajwadi Party

== Election results ==
=== 2027 ===
2027 Uttar Pradesh Legislative Assembly election: Nagina
Party	Candidate	Votes	%	±%
INDIA				
NDA				
BSP				
NOTA	None of the above			
Majority				
Turnout				
gain from		Swing		

=== 2022 ===
2022 Uttar Pradesh Legislative Assembly election: Nagina
Party	Candidate	Votes	%	±%
SP	Manoj Kumar Paras	97,155	43.51	+6.76
BJP	Yashwant Singh	70,704	31.67	−1.29
BSP	Brajpal Singh	40,164	17.99	−5.68
AIMIM	Lalita Kumari	9,515	4.26	+2.17
NOTA	None of the above	1,183	0.53	−0.16
Majority		26,451	11.84	+8.05
Turnout		223,282	64.36	+0.48
SP hold		Swing		

=== 2017 ===
2017 Uttar Pradesh Legislative Assembly election: Nagina
Party	Candidate	Votes	%	±%
SP	Manoj Kumar Paras	77,145	36.75	
BJP	Omvati Devi	69,178	32.96	
BSP	Virendra Pal	49,693	23.67	
AIMIM	Neelam Kumari	4,385	2.09	
PECP	Dr Phool Chaudhary	2,541	1.21	
RLD	Yadram Singh Chandel	2,113	1.01	
NOTA	None of the above	1,431	0.69	
Majority		7,967	3.79	
Turnout		209,903	63.88	
SP hold		Swing		

=== 2012 ===
2012 Uttar Pradesh Legislative Assembly election: Nagina
Party	Candidate	Votes	%	±%
SP	Manoj Kumar Paras	83,997	46.04	−
BSP	Omvati Devi	57,451	31.49	−
BJP	Luvkush Kumar	23,008	12.61	−
	Remainder 9 candidates	17,987	9.88	−
Majority		26,546	14.55	−
Turnout		182,443	60.94	−
SP gain from BSP		Swing		

== See also ==
- List of Vidhan Sabha constituencies of Uttar Pradesh
- Bijnor district
