= Jamil Ahmad Qasmi =

Jamil Ahmad Qasmi जमील अहमद क़ासमी

MLA, 16th Legislative Assembly
- In office March 2012 – March 2017
- Preceded by: Mithlesh Pal
- Succeeded by: Avtar Singh Bhadana
- Constituency: Meerapur

Personal details
- Born: 19 June 1961 (age 64) Muzaffarnagar district, Uttar Pradesh
- Citizenship: India
- Party: Bahujan Samaj Party
- Spouse: Mrs. Miskeena
- Children: 5 sons & 4 daughters.
- Parent: Mr. Sharif (father)
- Profession: Agriculturist & Politician
- Website: up.gov.in

Jamil Ahmad Qasmi (Hindi: जमील अहमद क़ासमी) is an Indian politician and a member of the 16th Legislative Assembly of Uttar Pradesh of India. He represents the Meerapur constituency of Uttar Pradesh and is a member of the Bahujan Samaj Party political party.

== Early life and education ==
Jamil Ahmad Qasmi was born in the district of Muzaffarnagar, Uttar Pradesh. Qasmi has received education till twelfth grade. Before being elected as MLA, he used to work as an agriculturist.

== Political career ==
Jamil Ahmad Qasmi has been a MLA for one term. He represents the Meerapur constituency.

== Posts Held ==
#	From	To	Position	Comments
01	March 2012	March 2017	Member, 16th Legislative Assembly	

== See also ==
- Meerapur
- Uttar Pradesh Legislative Assembly
- Government of India
- Politics of India
- Bahujan Samaj Party
