= Peda Urf Murtajapur Bulaki =

Peda
- village
- Location within Uttar Pradesh Location within India
- Coordinates: 29°24′28″N 78°09′50″E
- Country: India
- District: Bijnor
- Established: 1920; 106 years ago
- Founder: shiya

Government
  - Type: Gram Panchayat Pradhan
  - Body: Gram panchayat

Area
  - Total: 19,500.12 ha (48,185.8 acres)

Population (2011)
  - Total: 1,837
  - Density: 9.420/km^{2} (24.40/sq mi)

Languages
  - Officials: Hindi, Urdu
- Time zone: UTC+5:30 (IST)
- Vehicle registration: UP 20

Peda Urf Murtajapur Bulaki is a village in Bijnor tehsil, Bijnor district, Uttar Pradesh, India. Its post office is Naya Gaon, and in 2011 its population was 1,837.

== Riots in 2016 ==
In September 2016, there were communal riots in the village. BJP leader Aishwarya Chowdhary, husband of BJP MLA Suchi Chowdhary was the main accused in the case. When there were riots in Pada village, Muslim force leader Asaduddin Owaisi, Maulana Mahmood Madani and people came here but Owaisi was stopped from coming

== Religion ==
Religions in Peda (2011)
Religion	Percent
Hindus	48%
Muslims	52%
