= Prabhu Dayal Balmiki =

Indian politician (born 1963)

Prabhu Dayal Balmiki प्रभु दयाल बाल्मीकि

MLA, 16th Legislative Assembly
- In office Mar 2012 – Mar 2017
- Preceded by: Yogesh Verma
- Succeeded by: Dinesh Khatik
- Constituency: Hastinapur

MLA, 14th Legislative Assembly
- In office Feb-2002 – May-2007
- Preceded by: Atul Kumar
- Succeeded by: Yogesh Verma
- Constituency: Hastinapur

Personal details
- Born: 15 July 1963 (age 63) Meerut district, Uttar Pradesh
- Party: Samajwadi Party
- Spouse: Kamla Devi (wife)
- Children: 2 sons
- Parent: Omprakash (father)
- Education: Navjivan Kisan Inter College
- Profession: Shopkeeper & Politician

Prabhu Dayal Balmiki (Hindi: प्रभु दयाल बाल्मीकि; born 15 July 1963) is an Indian politician and a member of the 16th Legislative Assembly of Uttar Pradesh of India. He represented the Hastinapur constituency of Uttar Pradesh and was a member of the Samajwadi Party political party.

== Early life and education ==
Prabhu Dayal Balmiki was born in Meerut district, Uttar Pradesh. He attended the Navjivan Kisan Inter College and received education till tenth grade. Balmiki belongs to Scheduled Caste community.

== Political career ==
Prabhu Dayal Balmiki has been a MLA for two terms. He represented the Hastinapur constituency and is a member of the Samajwadi Party political party.

== Posts held ==
#	From	To	Position	Comments
02	2002	2007	Member, 14th Legislative Assembly	
01	2012	Mar-2017	Member, 16th Legislative Assembly	

== See also ==
- Hastinapur
- Sixteenth Legislative Assembly of Uttar Pradesh
- Uttar Pradesh Legislative Assembly
