= Meerapur Assembly constituency =

Constituency of the Uttar Pradesh legislative assembly in India

Meerapur
- Constituency No. 16 for the Uttar Pradesh Legislative Assembly

Constituency details
- Country: India
- Region: North India
- State: Uttar Pradesh
- District: Muzaffarnagar
- Lok Sabha constituency: Bijnor
- Reservation: None

Member of Legislative Assembly
- 18th Uttar Pradesh Legislative Assembly
- Incumbent Mithlesh Pal
- Party: RLD
- Alliance: NDA
- Elected year: 2024

Meerapur Assembly constituency is one of the 403 constituencies of the Uttar Pradesh Legislative Assembly, India. It is a part of the Muzaffarnagar district and one of the five assembly constituencies in the Bijnor Lok Sabha constituency. First election in this assembly constituency was held in 2012 after the "Delimitation of Parliamentary and Assembly Constituencies Order, 2008" was passed and the constituency came into existence in the year 2008.

== Wards / areas ==
Extent of Meerapur Assembly constituency is KCs Meerapur, Bhopa, PCs Salarpur, Jatwara, Kawal, Dhansari, Jolly, Kheri Ferozabad, Roorkali Talabali, Nagla Bujurg, Kamheda, Tissa, Kakrauli, Tewda of Jansath KC, Meerapur NP & Bhokerheri NP of Jansath Tehsil.

== Members of the Legislative Assembly ==
Year	Member	Party
Till 2012 : Constituency did not exist
2012	Jamil Ahmad Qasmi	Bahujan Samaj Party
2017	Avtar Singh Bhadana	Bharatiya Janata Party
2022	Chandan Chauhan	Rashtriya Lok Dal
2024^	Mithlesh Pal	Rashtriya Lok Dal

^ denotes bypoll

== Election results ==
=== 2027 ===
2027 Uttar Pradesh Legislative Assembly election: Meerapur
Party	Candidate	Votes	%	±%
AIMIM				
BJP				
INDIA				
BSP				
Majority				
Turnout				
gain from		Swing		

=== 2024 bypoll ===
Uttar Pradesh Legislative Assembly by-election, 2024: Meerapur
Party	Candidate	Votes	%	±%
RLD	Mithlesh Pal	84,304	45.43	
SP	Sumbul Rana	53,508	28.84	
ASP(KR)	Zahid Hussain	22,661	12.21	
AIMIM	Arshad Rana	18,869	10.17	
NOTA	None of the above	501	0.27	
Majority		30,796	16.59	
Turnout		1,85,550	57.10	
RLD hold		Swing		

=== 2022 ===
2022 Uttar Pradesh Legislative Assembly election: Meerapur
Party	Candidate	Votes	%	±%
RLD	Chandan Chauhan	107,421	49.57	▲38.44
BJP	Prashant Chaudhary	80,041	36.94	▲3.17
BSP	Salim Qureshi	23,797	10.98	▼8.44
NOTA	None of the above	888	0.41	▼0.13
Majority		27,380	12.63	▲12.54
Turnout		216,692	68.88	▼0.61
RLD gain from BJP		Swing		

=== 2017 ===
2017 General Elections: Meerapur
Party	Candidate	Votes	%	±%
BJP	Avtar Singh Bhadana	69,035	33.77	
SP	Liyakat Ali	68,842	33.68	
BSP	Nawazish Alam Khan	39,689	19.42	
RLD	Mithlesh Pal	22,751	11.13	
NOTA	None of the above	1,090	0.54	
Majority		193	0.09	
Turnout		204,405	69.49	
BJP gain from BSP		Swing	5.66	

=== 2012 ===
2012 General Elections: Meerapur
Party	Candidate	Votes	%	±%
BSP	Jamil Ahmad Qasmi	56,802	33.66	−
RLD	Mithlesh Pal	44,069	26.12	−
BJP	Veerpal Nirwal	25,689	15.22	−
SP	Mehrajuddin Tewra	21,083	12.49	−
Majority		12,733	7.55	−
Turnout		168742	61.76	−
BSP hold		Swing		

== See also ==
- Government of Uttar Pradesh
- Bijnor Lok Sabha constituency
- List of Vidhan Sabha constituencies of Uttar Pradesh
- Muzaffarnagar district
- Sixteenth Legislative Assembly of Uttar Pradesh
- Uttar Pradesh Legislative Assembly
- Uttar Pradesh
