= Mangal Ram Premi =

Indian politician

Member of Parliament, Lok Sabha
- In office 1991-1998
- Preceded by: Mahi Lal
- Succeeded by: Chowdhry Girdhari Lal
- In office 1980-1984
- Preceded by: Mayawati
- Succeeded by: Omvati Devi
- Constituency: Bijnor

Personal details
- Born: 25 August 1925 Prithvipur, Bijnor, United Provinces, British India
- Died: 11 December 2001 (aged 76) New Delhi
- Party: Bharatiya Janata Party

Mangal Ram Premi (1925 – 2001) was an Indian politician. He was elected to the Lok Sabha, the lower house of the Parliament of India from the Bijnor constituency in Uttar Pradesh in 1980, 1991 and 1996. From Bijnor seat, he won in 1980 and lost in 1984 and 1989, while in Charan Singh's party. He joined Bharatiya Janata Party and was elected in 1991 and 1996, but lost in 1998.

When BJP denied him ticket from Bijnor in 1999, he joined Ajit Singh's Lok Dal and contested again, but lost.
