= Manoj Kumar Paras =

Indian politician

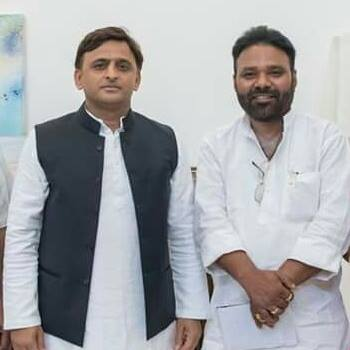
- Paras with Akhilesh Yadav

State Minister Uttar Pradesh Stamp & Civil Defence
- In office 2012–2014

Member of Uttar Pradesh Legislative Assembly
- Incumbent
- Assumed office March 2012
- Preceded by: Omwati Devi
- Constituency: Nagina

Personal details
- Born: 14 June 1967 (age 59) Binzhahed, Uttar Pradesh, India
- Citizenship: Indian
- Party: Samajwadi Party
- Spouse: Neelam Singh Paras (m. 1994)
- Children: 1
- Profession: Agriculturist, politician

Manoj Kumar Paras is an Indian politician and a member of the Uttar Pradesh Legislative Assembly of India. He represents the Nagina constituency of Uttar Pradesh and is a member of the Samajwadi Party political party.

== Personal life ==
Paras was born on 14 June 1967 to Amar Singh 'Ravi' in Binzhahed, Bijnor district, Uttar Pradesh. After completing intermediate education, Paras enrolled in the Bachelor of Arts degree in Garhwal University, Uttarakhand, but dropped out completing the first year. Paras married Neelam Singh Paras on 17 April 1994, with whom he has a son. He is an agriculturist by profession.

== Political career ==
Manoj Kumar Paras has been a MLA for two terms. He represents the Nagina constituency and is a member of the Samajwadi Party political party. Paras was also a minister in the Government of Uttar Pradesh. On 9 March 2014, Paras was sacked (as minister) by Akhilesh Yadav on grounds of "anti-party activities".

In 2017 elections he defeated Bhartiya Janata Party candidate Omwati Devi by a margin of 7,967 votes.

== Posts held ==
#	From	To	Position	Comments
01	March 2012	March 2017	Member, 16th Legislative Assembly	
02	March 2012	9 March 2014	Minister, Stamp and civil defence	Sacked by Akhilesh Yadav in March 2014.
03	March 2017	March 2022	Member, 17th Legislative Assembly	
04	March 2022	Incumbent	Member, 18th Legislative Assembly	

== See also ==
- Nagina
- Uttar Pradesh Legislative Assembly
- Government of India
- Politics of India
- Samajwadi Party
