= Sanjay Singh Chauhan =

Indian politician (1961-2014)

Member 15th Lok Sabha
- In office 2009–2014
- Preceded by: Munshiram Singh
- Succeeded by: Kunwar Bhartendra Singh
- Constituency: Bijnor

Member of Uttar Pradesh Legislative Assembly
- In office 1996–2002
- Preceded by: Rampal Singh Saini
- Succeeded by: Rajpal Singh Saini

Personal details
- Born: 10 October 1961 Muzaffarnagar, Uttar Pradesh, India
- Died: 2 October 2014 (aged 52)
- Party: Rashtriya Lok Dal (2009-2014)
- Other political affiliations: Samajwadi Party (1996-2009)
- Spouse: Anuradha Chauhan
- Children: Chandan Chauhan
- Parent: Chaudhary Narain Singh (father)
- Education: Chaudhary Charan Singh University
- Occupation: Politician
- Committees: Member, Committee on Food, Consumer Affairs and Public Distribution 31 August 2009
- Website: Lok Sabha bio

Sanjay Singh Chauhan (10 October 1961 – 2 October 2014) was an Indian politician. He was the active member of the Rashtriya Lok Dal (RLD) and was a member of Parliament representing Bijnor in Uttar Pradesh state in the 15th Lok Sabha. He was also a Member of State Legislative Assembly, Uttar Pradesh from 1996 to 2001.

== Biography ==
He was the son of Narayan Singh ex Deputy CM of Uttar Pradesh. He graduated with B.A., LL.B., was educated at S.D. Degree College and D.A.V. Degree College, Muzaffar Nagar and Chaudhary Charan Singh University, Meerut. He was a notable Gurjar leader from Uttar Pradesh.
