= Hastinapur Assembly constituency =

Constituency of the Uttar Pradesh legislative assembly in India

Coordinates: 29.1700°N 78.0200°E

Hastinapur हस्तिनापुर
- Constituency No. 45 for the Uttar Pradesh Legislative Assembly

Constituency details
- Country: India
- Region: North India
- State: Uttar Pradesh
- District: Meerut
- Established: 1956
- Total electors: 326,707 (2017)
- Reservation: SC

Member of Legislative Assembly
- 18th Uttar Pradesh Legislative Assembly
- Incumbent Dinesh Khatik
- Party: Bharatiya Janta Party
- Alliance: NDA
- Elected year: 2022

Hastinapur is one of the 403 constituencies of the Uttar Pradesh Legislative Assembly, India. It is a part of the Meerut district and one of the five assembly constituencies in the Bijnor Lok Sabha constituency. First election in this assembly constituency was held in 1957 after the "DPACO (1956)" order was passed and the constituency was constituted in 1956. The constituency was assigned identification number 45 after the "Delimitation of Parliamentary and Assembly Constituencies Order, 2008" was passed. In 1991 and 1993, elections were not held in this constituency. Since 1967, Hastinapur Assembly constituency is a reserved seat for SC candidates. Hastinapur assembly constituency is considered as Hindu dominant. The numbers of Hindu voters in this seat is around 2.25 lakhs

== Wards / Areas ==
Extent of Hastinapur Assembly constituency is KCs Hastinapur, Parikshatgarh, PCs Tatina, Niloha, Bana, Bhainsa, Mawana Kalan-I, Mawana Khurd, Mubarikpur, Sandhan, Dhikoli of Mawana KC, Mawana MB, Bahsooma NP, Hastinapur NP & Parikshatgarh NP of Mawana Tehsil.

== Members of the Legislative Assembly ==
Year	Member	Party
1957	Bishember Singh	Indian National Congress
1962	Pitam Singh	Indian National Congress
1967	R. L. Sahayak	Indian National Congress
1969	Asha Ram Indu	Bharatiya Kranti Dal
1974	Reoti Sharan Maurya	Indian National Congress
1977	Reoti Sharan Maurya	Janata Party
1980	Jhaggar Singh	Indian National Congress (I)
1985	Harsharan Singh Jatav	Indian National Congress
1989	Jhaggad Singh	Janata Dal
1991	Elections not held	
1993	Elections not held	
1996	Atul Kumar	Independent
2002	Prabhu Dayal Balmiki	Samajwadi Party
2007	Yogesh Verma	Bahujan Samaj Party
2012	Prabhu Dayal Balmiki	Samajwadi Party
2017	Dinesh Khatik	Bharatiya Janata Party
2022	Dinesh Khatik	Bharatiya Janata Party

== Election results ==
=== 2027 ===
2027 Uttar Pradesh Legislative Assembly election: Hastinapur
Party	Candidate	Votes	%	±%
INDIA				
NDA				
BSP				
NOTA	None of the above			
Majority				
Turnout				
gain from		Swing		

=== 2022 ===
2022 Uttar Pradesh Legislative Assembly election: Hastinapur
Party	Candidate	Votes	%	±%
BJP	Dinesh Khatik	107,587	46.72	▲1.8
SP	Yogesh Verma	100,275	43.55	▲21.42
BSP	Sanjeev Kumar Jatav	14,240	6.18	▼22.45
AIMIM	Vinod Jatav	4,290	1.86	
NOTA	None of the above	671	0.29	▼0.17
Majority		7,312	3.17	▼13.12
Turnout		230,276	66.84	▼0.92
BJP hold		Swing		

=== 2017 ===
2017 Uttar Pradesh Legislative Assembly election: Hastinapur
Party	Candidate	Votes	%	±%
BJP	Dinesh Khatik	99,436	44.92	
BSP	Yogesh Verma	63,374	28.63	
SP	Prabhu Dayal Balmiki	48,979	22.13	
RLD	Kusum Siddharth	6,538	2.95	
NOTA	None of the above	1,013	0.46	
Majority		36,062	16.29	
Turnout		221,371	67.76	
BJP gain from SP		Swing		

=== 2012 ===
2012 Uttar Pradesh Legislative Assembly election: Hastinapur
Party	Candidate	Votes	%	±%
SP	Prabhu Dayal Balmiki	46,742	25.31	−
PECP	Yogesh Verma	40,101	21.71	−
INC	Gopal Kali	39,009	21.12	−
BSP	Prashant Kumar Gautam	30,692	16.62	
BJP	Bijendra Lohare	23,514	12.73	
Majority		6,641	3.60	−
Turnout		1,84,686	61.53	−
SP gain from BSP		Swing		

== See also ==
- Bijnor Lok Sabha constituency
- Meerut district
- Sixteenth Legislative Assembly of Uttar Pradesh
- Uttar Pradesh Legislative Assembly
