= Chandan Chauhan =

Indian politician

Chandan Singh Chauhan

Member of Parliament, Lok Sabha
- Incumbent
- Assumed office 4 June 2024
- Preceded by: Malook Nagar
- Constituency: Bijnor

Member of the Uttar Pradesh Legislative Assembly
- In office 10 March 2022 – June 2024
- Preceded by: Avtar Singh Bhadana
- Succeeded by: Mithlesh Pal
- Constituency: Meerapur

Personal details
- Born: 23 August 1988 (age 38) Muzaffarnagar
- Party: Rashtriya Lok Dal (2022-present)
- Other political affiliations: Samajwadi Party (2011-2022)
- Spouse: Yashika Chauhan
- Relations: Chaudhary Narain Singh (grandfather)
- Children: 2
- Parent: Sanjay Singh Chauhan (father)
- Education: Chaudhary Charan Singh University

Chandan Singh Chauhan (Hindi pronunciation: [t͡ʃən̪d̪ən̪ sɪŋgʱ t͡ʃɔːɦaːn̪]) is an Indian politician from Uttar Pradesh. He is currently serving Member of Parliament, Lok Sabha from Bijnor. He was former member in 18th Uttar Pradesh Assembly from Meerapur representing Rashtriya Lok Dal. He is son of RLD politician Sanjay Singh Chauhan and Grandson of Chaudhary Narain Singh.

Chandan Chauhan, who hails from the gurjar community, is a first-time MLA from Meerapur in Muzaffarnagar. He was a member of the Samajwadi Party but contested on the RLD symbol as per the alliance pact. He defeated BJP’s Prashant Chaudhary in 2022 by a margin of over 27,380 votes. Chauhan’s political lineage adds weight to his candidacy, as his grandfather, Chaudhary Narayan Singh, was the first deputy chief minister of UP, and his father, Sanjay Singh Chauhan represented Bijnor in the 15th Lok Sabha.
