= Swami Ramanand Shastri =

Indian politician

Member of Parliament, Lok Sabha
- In office 1952, 1967, 1971 - 1974
- Constituency: Bijnor, Uttar Pradesh

Personal details
- Born: 7 February 1908 Dhaulaba, Ahmedabad District, Bombay Presidency, British India (now Gujarat, India)
- Died: 1974
- Party: Indian National Congress

Swami Ramanand Shastri (1908 - 1974) was an Indian politician. He was elected from the Bijnor in Uttar Pradesh to the lower House of the Indian Parliament the Lok Sabha as a member of the Indian National Congress in 1952, 1967 and 1971.

Swami Ramanand Shastri died in 1974. The bye-poll necessitated by his death was won unopposed by Ram Dayal of Congress when his Jana Sangh rival withdrew from the contest.
