= Bijnor Assembly constituency =

Constituency of the Uttar Pradesh legislative assembly in India

Bijnor
- Constituency No. 22 for the Uttar Pradesh Legislative Assembly

Constituency details
- Country: India
- Region: North India
- State: Uttar Pradesh
- District: Bijnor
- Total electors: 317,824 (2012)
- Reservation: None

Member of Legislative Assembly
- 18th Uttar Pradesh Legislative Assembly
- Incumbent Suchi Chaudhary
- Party: Bharatiya Janata Party
- Elected year: 2017

Bijnor Assembly constituency is one of the 403 constituencies of the Uttar Pradesh Legislative Assembly, India. It is a part of the Bijnor district and one of the five assembly constituencies in the Bijnor Lok Sabha constituency. First election in this assembly constituency was held in 1951 after the delimitation order (DPACO - 1951) was passed in 1951. The constituency was assigned identification number 22 after "Delimitation of Parliamentary and Assembly Constituencies Order, 2008" was passed in the year 2008.

== Wards / Areas ==
Extent of Bijnor Assembly constituency is KC Mandawar, Bijnor, Dara Nagar, Mandawar NP, Jhalu NP & Bijnor MB of Bijnor Tehsil.

== Members of the Legislative Assembly ==
Year	Member	Party
1952	Chandrawati	Indian National Congress
1957	Chandrawati	Indian National Congress
1962	Kunwar Satya Vir	Indian National Congress
1967	Kunwar Satya Vir	Indian National Congress
1969	Ram Pal Singh	Bharatiya Kranti Dal
1974	Azizur Rahman	Indian National Congress
1977	Kunwar Satya Vir	Janata Party
1980	Azizur Rahman	Indian National Congress (I)
1985	Azizur Rahman	Indian National Congress
1989	Sukhveer Singh	Janata Dal
1991	Mahendra Pal Singh	Bharatiya Janata Party
1993	Mahendra Pal Singh	Bharatiya Janata Party
1996	Raja Gazaffar	Bahujan Samaj Party
2002	Bharatendra Singh	Bharatiya Janata Party
2007	Shahnawaz Rana	Bahujan Samaj Party
2012	Bharatendra Singh	Bharatiya Janata Party
2014^	Ruchi Veera	Samajwadi Party
2017	Suchi Chaudhary	Bharatiya Janata Party
2022	Suchi Chaudhary	Bharatiya Janata Party

== Election results ==
=== 2027 ===
2027 Uttar Pradesh Legislative Assembly election: Bijnor
Party	Candidate	Votes	%	±%
INDIA				
NDA				
BSP				
NOTA	None of the above			
Majority				
Turnout				
gain from		Swing		

=== 2022 ===
2022 Uttar Pradesh Legislative Assembly election: Bijnor
Party	Candidate	Votes	%	±%
BJP	Suchi Chaudhary	97,165	38.54	▼4.41
RLD	Neeraj Chaudhary	95,720	37.96	▲34.79
BSP	Ruchi Veera	52,035	20.64	▲0.38
AIMIM	Adv Muneer Ahmed	2,290	0.91	
NOTA	None of the above	1,114	0.44	▼0.07
Majority		1,445	0.58	▼10.52
Turnout		252,142	64.56	▼3.11
BJP hold		Swing		

=== 2017 ===
2017 Uttar Pradesh Legislative Assembly election: Bijnor
Party	Candidate	Votes	%	±%
BJP	Suchi Chaudhary	105,548	42.95	
SP	Ruchi Veera	78,267	31.85	
BSP	Rashid Ahmed	49,788	20.26	
RLD	Rahul Singh	7,799	3.17	
NOTA	None of the above	1,241	0.51	
Majority		27,281	11.1	
Turnout		245,771	67.67	
BJP gain from SP		Swing		

=== 2014 ===
2014 Uttar Pradesh Legislative Assembly By election: Bijnor
Party	Candidate	Votes	%	±%
SP	Ruchi Veera	101,748	49.40	
BJP	Hemendra Pal Singh	90,181	43.78	
PECP	Jameel Ahmed	3,242	1.57	
INC	Humayun Baig	2,585	1.25	
RARS	Dharmendra Singh	2,487	1.21	
NOTA	None of the Above	1,479	0.72	
Majority		11,567	5.62	
Turnout		2,05,966	58.13	
SP gain from BJP		Swing		

=== 2012 ===
2012 Uttar Pradesh Legislative Assembly election: Bijnor
Party	Candidate	Votes	%	±%
BJP	Bharatendra Singh	68,600	32.04	▼4.79
BSP	Mohammad Mahboob	51,133	24.42	
RLD	Shahnawaz Rana	47,402	22.67	▼14.5
SP	Ruchi Veera	25,173	12.02	
MD	Bala Kumar	4,673	2.23	
Independent	Virendra Kumar	1,620	0.78	▲0.49
Independent	Kamal	1,425	0.68	
Independent	Shehzad Ali	1,178	0.56	
Independent	Krishan Kumar	969	0.46	
IJP	Surendra Singh	842	0.40	
AITC	Anwar Babu	825	0.39	
Independent	Dharmendra Singh	682	0.33	
Independent	Chatenram	678	0.32	
Independent	Hukam Singh	555	0.27	
Rashtriya Lokmanch	Mehfooz	493	0.24	
PHSP	Totaram	363	0.17	
RLNP	Nasir	362	0.17	
Independent	Mehendra	352	0.17	
VAJP	Anil	323	0.15	
Jan Kranti Party	Ghanshyam	313	0.15	
SSD	Fakhruddin	290	0.14	
Independent	Zakir Ali Rana	260	0.12	
ARVP	Kamar Haidar	240	0.12	
BSKP	Netram	188	0.09	
Majority		17,467	8.15	▲7.81
Turnout		209,385	65.88	▲8.3
BJP gain from BSP		Swing		

=== 2007 ===
2007 Uttar Pradesh Legislative Assembly election: Bijnor
Party	Candidate	Votes	%	±%
BSP	Shahnawaz Rana	61,588	37.17	
BJP	Bharatendra Singh	61,031	36.83	▲1.66
SP	Shahid Ali	21,826	13.17	
RLD	Sukhvir Singh	5,890	3.55	
INC	Sudhir Parashar	3,811	2.30	
Independent	Nishchal Kumar	1,415	0.85	
Independent	Dheer Singh	1,250	0.75	
PHSP	Kirpal Singh Saini	947	0.57	
Independent	Rampal	943	0.57	
Independent	Naiver Malik	927	0.56	
NCP	Narpal	910	0.55	
Independent	Ram Kumar	847	0.51	
Independent	Harveer Devi	656	0.40	
RPI(A)	Zishan Malik	546	0.33	▼0.37
Independent	Virendra Kumar	485	0.29	
Independent	Tasleem	470	0.28	
LKD	Prakash	375	0.23	
Independent	Shahnawaz	353	0.21	
LJP	Dr. Sukh Pal Singh	339	0.20	
Independent	Samullah	286	0.17	
Independent	Purshottam	271	0.16	
NLHP	Irshad	265	0.16	
Independent	Chandra Pal Singh	259	0.16	
Majority		557	0.34	▼10.67
Turnout		165,691	57.58	▼0.29
BSP gain from BJP		Swing		

=== 2002 ===
2002 Uttar Pradesh Legislative Assembly election: Bijnor
Party	Candidate	Votes	%	±%
BJP	Bharatendra Singh	52,195	35.17	
SP	Tasleem Ahmed	35,856	24.16	
BSP	Tariq Ali	34,723	23.39	
Independent	Udayan Vira	4,947	3.33	
INLD	Tejpal Verma	4,308	2.90	
LJP	Raja Gazaffar	3,612	2.43	▼42.39
INC	Neeraj Chaudhary	3,223	2.17	
MUL	Javaid Aftab Siddiqui	2,779	1.87	
NCP	Zishan Malik	1,035	0.70	
Independent	Mohd. Kasim	955	0.64	
RTKP	Ram Kishan	702	0.47	
Independent	Rekha Hojra	640	0.43	
NINM	Azeezurrehman	626	0.42	
SS	Sharvan Kumar	538	0.36	
Independent	Umrav Singh	532	0.36	
Independent	Qazi Ziaurrehman	429	0.29	▼0.04
Independent	Meena Khan	416	0.28	▼0.22
RPD	Shamim Khan	333	0.22	
Independent	Gajraj Singh	316	0.21	
JP	Vinay Singh	259	0.17	
Majority		16,339	11.01	▼4.6
Turnout		148,424	57.87	▼8.49
BJP gain from BSP		Swing		

== See also ==
- Bijnor Lok Sabha constituency
- Bijnor district
- Government of Uttar Pradesh
- List of Vidhan Sabha constituencies of Uttar Pradesh
- Sixteenth Legislative Assembly of Uttar Pradesh
- Uttar Pradesh Legislative Assembly
- Uttar Pradesh
