= Pramod Utwal =

Indian politician

MLA in 17th Legislative Assembly of Uttar Pradesh
- In office March 2017 – March 2022
- Preceded by: Anil Kumar
- Succeeded by: Anil Kumar
- Constituency: Purqazi assembly constituency

Personal details
- Born: Patel Nagar, Muzaffarnagar, Uttar Pradesh, India
- Party: Bharatiya Janata Party
- Education: 8th, Gandhi Vidhya Kendra Junior High School New Mandi Muzaffarnagar
- Occupation: MLA
- Profession: Politician

Pramod Utwal is an Indian politician. He belongs to the Bharatiya Janata Party. He is a member of Seventeenth Legislative Assembly of Uttar Pradesh representing the Purqazi assembly constituency. He is 49 years old (2017) and a high-school dropout.

== Political career ==
Pramod Utwal has been a member of the 17th Legislative Assembly of Uttar Pradesh. Since 2017, he has represented the Purqazi (Assembly constituency) and is a member of the Bhartiya Janata Party. He defeated Indian National Congress candidate Deepak Kumar by a margin of 11,253 votes.

== Posts held ==
#	From	To	Position	Comments
01	2017	Incumbent	Member, 17th Legislative Assembly	
