= Mahi Lal =

Indian politician from Bijnor

Member of Parliament, Lok Sabha
- In office 1977-1980
- Preceded by: Ram Dayal
- Succeeded by: Mangal Ram Premi
- Constituency: Bijnor, Uttar Pradesh

Personal details
- Born: 7 March 1920 Milak Village, Moradabad district, United Provinces, British India (present-day Uttar Pradesh, India)
- Died: 5 February 1990 (aged 69)
- Party: Janata Party
- Spouse: Yasoda Devi

Mahi Lal was an Indian politician. He was elected to the Lok Sabha, the lower house of the Parliament of India from Bijnor, Uttar Pradesh as a member of the Janata Party.
