= Omvati Devi =

Indian politician (born 1949)

Member of Parliament, Lok Sabha
- In office 10 March 1998 – 26 April 1999
- Preceded by: Mangal Ram Premi
- Succeeded by: Sheeshram Singh Ravi
- Constituency: Bijnor

Personal details
- Born: 1949 (age 76–77)
- Party: Indian National Congress
- Other political affiliations: Samajwadi Party; Bahujan Samaj Party
- Spouse: R.K. Singh
- Education: R.S.M. Degree College, Dhampur
- Profession: Politician, Social Worker

Omvati Devi (born 1949) is a politician and a member of parliament elected from the Bijnor constituency in the Indian state of Uttar Pradesh being a Samajwadi Party candidate, who was a member of the 12th Lok Sabha.

She joined Indian National Congress in 2019 and unsuccessfully contested in 2019 Loksabha Elections from Nagina.

== Early life ==
Omvati was born in the year 1949 in Takhawali village in Bijnor,(Uttar Pradesh). She married R. K. Singh in June 1959 and they have a son and four daughters.

== Education and career ==
Omvati completed her schooling from R.S.M. Degree College, Dhampur. She first joined the Uttar Pradesh Legislative Assembly in 1985. In 1998, she was elected to the 12th Lok Sabha. From 1998 to 1999, she served as:

- Member, Committee on Labour and Welfare
- Member, Users' Committee, Northern Railway
- Member, Consultative Committee, Ministry of Chemicals and Fertilizers
