= Indira Park, Bijnor =

Urban park in Bijnor, Uttar Pradesh, India

Coordinates: 29.3871°N 78.1287°E

Indira Park is an urban park in Bijnor, Uttar Pradesh, India.

== Background ==
Indira Park was once the biggest problem of the city. For about 10 years, a large part of Indira Park turned into a dirty pond. No attention was paid to it. After 25 years, its beauty started to be restored. Paddle boats will once again run in the park, and water has started coming in the fountains again. Along with this, pedestrians will be able to see the birds in the nests being installed there.
