= Sukhveer Singh =

Indian politician

Member of the Uttar Pradesh Legislative Assembly
- In office December 1989 – April 1991
- Succeeded by: Mahendra Pal Singh
- Constituency: Bijnor

Personal details
- Born: Uttar Pradesh, India
- Citizenship: Indian
- Party: Janata Dal
- Occupation: Politician

Sukhveeer Singh was a Janata Dal member of the Legislative Assembly of Uttar Pradesh from December 1989 to April 1991.

== See also ==
- Uttar Pradesh Legislative Assembly
- Janata Dal
