= Malook Nagar =

Indian politician and businessman

Member of Parliament, Lok Sabha
- In office 23 May 2019 – 4 June 2024
- Preceded by: Bharatendra Singh
- Succeeded by: Chandan Chauhan
- Constituency: Bijnor

Personal details
- Born: 3 July 1964 (age 62) Shakarpur, Uttar Pradesh, India
- Party: Rashtriya Lok Dal
- Other political affiliations: BSP
- Spouse: Sudha Nagar (m. 1989)
- Children: 2
- Education: B.Sc. (Biology) Educated at S.S.V. Degree College, Hapur, Uttar Pradesh
- Alma mater: S.S.V P.G. College, Hapur
- Occupation: Politician
- Profession: Business

Malook Nagar (born 3 July 1964) is an Indian politician and businessman. He was former Member of Parliament in the 17th Lok Sabha from Bijnor. He unsuccessfully contested Meerut and Bijnor Lok Sabha constituencies of Uttar Pradesh in 2009 and 2014 respectively as a candidate of the Bahujan Samaj Party.

== Personal life ==
Nagar was born on 3 July 1964 to Rameshwar Dayal Nagar and Shanti Nagar in gurjar family Shakarpur village of Hapur district of Uttar Pradesh. He completed his high school in 1980 from HNS College Upera and Intermediate from A S Inter College Mawana, Meerut in 1983. He graduated with a Bachelor of Science degree (in 1985) from SSV Degree College in Hapur. He married Sudha Nagar on 6 July 1989, with whom he has two sons.

== Income Tax Raids ==
Nagar is a businessman. Malook Nagar, according to his nomination filings has 249 crore rupees in cash and has 7 criminal cases against him.
