= Abdul Lateef Gandhi =

Indian politician

Abdul Lateef Gandhi is an Indian politician and Member of Parliament, Lok Sabha who was elected during the 1957 Indian general election, representing the constituency of Bijnor. He is affiliated with the Indian National Congress party.
