= Bijnor railway station =

Railway station in Uttar Pradesh, India

General information
- Location: National Highway 119, Bijnor, Uttar Pradesh; India
- Coordinates: 29.3857°N 78.1472°E
- Elevation: 108 metres (354 ft)
- System: Indian Railways station
- Owner: Indian Railways
- Operator: Northern Railway
- Platforms: 3
- Tracks: 4 (single diesel broad gauge)
- Connections: Auto stand

Construction
- Structure type: Standard (on-ground station)
- Parking: Yes
- Cycle facilities: Yes
- Accessible: Yes

Other information
- Status: Functioning
- Station code: BJO
- Zone(s): Northern Railway
- Division(s): Moradabad

History
- Rebuilt: 2025
Location
- Location within India Location within Uttar Pradesh

Bijnor railway station is a railway station in India where Mussoori express, Garhwal express, and Chandigarh Lucknow express trains are stopped. The only railway station is the Najibabad Junction Railway Station in Bijnor district where maximum trains stop, start and terminate. Its code is BJO and serves Bijnor city. The station consists of three platforms. The platforms are not well sheltered and lacks many facilities including water and sanitation.

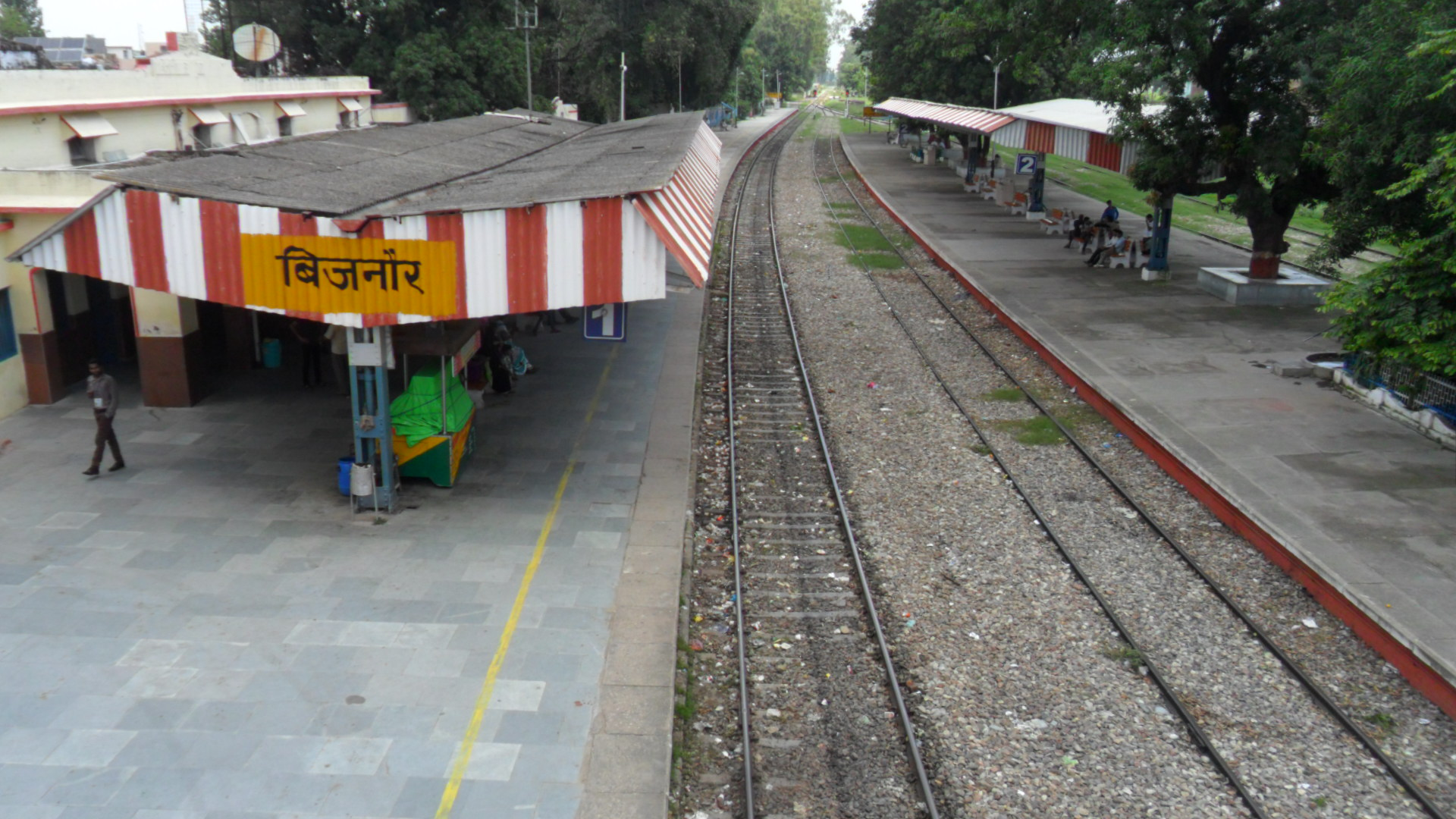
Bijnor Railway Station

== Trains ==
Some of the trains that run from Bijnor are:

- Mussoorie Express
- Najibabad–Moradabad Passenger (via Gajraula)
- Lucknow–Chandigarh Express (via Gajraula)
- Sidhbali Jan Shatabdi Express (previously Garhwal Express)
