= Purqazi Assembly constituency =

Constituency of the Uttar Pradesh legislative assembly in India

Purqazi
- Constituency No. 13 for the Uttar Pradesh Legislative Assembly

Constituency details
- Country: India
- Region: North India
- State: Uttar Pradesh
- District: Muzaffarnagar
- Lok Sabha constituency: Bijnor
- Total electors: 3,29,110
- Reservation: SC

Member of Legislative Assembly
- 18th Uttar Pradesh Legislative Assembly
- Incumbent Anil Kumar
- Party: RLD
- Alliance: NDA
- Elected year: 2022

Purqazi Assembly constituency is one of the 403 constituencies of the Uttar Pradesh Legislative Assembly, India. It is a part of the Muzaffarnagar district and one of the five assembly constituencies in the Bijnor Lok Sabha constituency. The first election in this assembly constituency was held in 2012 after the "Delimitation of Parliamentary and Assembly Constituencies Order, 2008" was passed and the constituency came into existence in 2008.

== Wards / Areas ==
Extent of Purqazi Assembly constituency is KCs Muzaffarnagar, Sherpur, Chhapar, Bagowali, Sisona, Badhedi, Bijopra, Khudda, Khampur, Barla & Purqazi Nagar Panchayat of Muzaffarnagar Tehsil.

== Members of the Legislative Assembly ==
Election	Member	Party
Till 2012 : Constituency did not exist
2012	Anil Kumar	Bahujan Samaj Party
2017	Pramod Utwal	Bharatiya Janata Party
2022	Anil Kumar	Rashtriya Lok Dal

== Election results ==
=== 2027 ===
2027 Uttar Pradesh Legislative Assembly election: Purqazi
Party	Candidate	Votes	%	±%
INDIA				
RLD	Anil Kumar			
BSP	Kavita Devi			
NOTA	None of the above			
Majority				
Turnout				
gain from		Swing		

=== 2022 ===
2022 Uttar Pradesh Legislative Assembly election: Purqazi
Party	Candidate	Votes	%	±%
RLD	Anil Kumar	92,672	43.09	▲39.06
BJP	Pramod Utwal	86,140	40.05	▲2.12
BSP	Surendra Pal Singh	27,778	12.91	▼9.8
ASP(KR)	Uma Kiran	2,321	1.08	
NOTA	None of the above	921	0.43	▼0.13
Majority		6,532	3.04	▼2.47
Turnout		215,085	65.35	▲0.27
RLD gain from BJP		Swing		

=== 2017 ===
2017 Uttar Pradesh Legislative Assembly election: Purqazi
Party	Candidate	Votes	%	±%
BJP	Pramod Utwal	77,491	37.93	
INC	Deepak Kumar	66,238	32.42	
BSP	Anil Kumar	46,401	22.71	
RLD	Choti Begum	8,227	4.03	
SP	Uma Kiran	2,570	1.26	
NOTA	None of the above	1,139	0.56	
Majority		11,253	5.51	
Turnout		204,319	65.08	

=== 2012 ===
2012 Uttar Pradesh Legislative Assembly election: Purqazi
Party	Candidate	Votes	%	±%
BSP	Anil Kumar	53,491	31.94	
INC	Deepak Kumar	44,583	26.62	
SP	Uma Kiran	40,578	24.23	
BJP	Prachi Arya	22,987	13.73	
Majority		8908	5.32	
Turnout		1,67,467	59.53	

== See also ==
- Bijnor Lok Sabha constituency
- List of constituencies of the Uttar Pradesh Legislative Assembly
- Muzaffarnagar district
