= Abdur Rahman Bijnori =

Indian Urdu poet and scholar

- Born: June 10, 1885; Bijnor, North-Western Provinces, British India
- Died: November 7, 1918 (aged 33); Central Provinces and Berar, British India
- Education: Aligarh Muslim University; Lincoln's Inn; University of Freiburg
- Occupations: Poet, scholar
- Writing career
- Language: Urdu

Abdur Rahman Bijnori (10 June 1885 – 7 November 1918) was an Indian Urdu poet and scholar. He wrote essays and Urdu poetry, including an introductory book to the Diwan-e-Ghalib, titled Mahasin-i-Kalam-i-Ghalib which became one of his prominent writings, and Maqalat-i-Bijnori – a magnum opus book consisting of essays, poems and letters written by him to his parents when he was studying in Europe. Some of his writings include predictions about Turkey's decline and its impact on the Muslim world. He also predicted 20th century's rise of Europe and its influence.

== Early life and education ==
He was born in Seohara, a town in the present-day District Bijnor on 10 June 1885 in an aristocratic family. His father was given the title of Khan Bahadur by the government and his family traced its lineage to Hasan Zinjani, a scholar-official originally from Zinjan who accompanied Babur as he conquered the areas in doab region. A learned family having towering religious scholars like Maulana Hifzur Rahman Seoharvi who served as the member of the constituent assembly, literary critics, poets, authors and high ranking officials, his family members held high posts in Bijnor and Delhi. Bijnori received his early schooling in Balochistan and later went to Quetta, where he did his matriculation. He later obtained BA and LLB degrees from Aligarh Muslim University. He then went to London and obtained a law degree from Lincoln's Inn and then to Germany, where he obtained a doctorate from the University of Freiburg.

He was posted at Bijnor and then at Moradabad magistrate before he moved to Quetta, where he died.

== Work ==
He spoke various foreign languages such as German, Arabic, Persian, English and Urdu, leading his writings to earn recognition in the Indian subcontinent. His publication Maqalat-i-Bijnori was published when he was studying at Aligarh Muslim University.

Professor Rasheed Ahmad Siddiqui wrote a book titled Baqiyat-i-Bijnori which is a detailed biography of Bijnori. It was published in Delhi in 1940. His contribution to literature is covered in the book Yadgar-i-Bijnori by Abdul Haq, published in Rawalpindi in 1951.

== Death ==
He died on November 7, 1918, in Central Provinces and Berar, British India (in modern-day Madhya Pradesh, India). He died at young age.

== Bibliography ==
- Mahasin-i-Kalam-i-Ghalib
- Maqalat-i-Bijnori
