= Azizur Rahman (Indian politician) =

Indian politician

Member of 06th Legislative Assembly of Uttar Pradesh
- In office March 1974 – November 1989

Member of 08th Legislative Assembly of Uttar Pradesh

Member of 09th Legislative Assembly of Uttar Pradesh

Azizur Rahman is an Indian Politician and member of Indian National Congress. He represented Bijnor (Assembly constituency) 06th Legislative Assembly of Uttar Pradesh 08th Legislative Assembly of Uttar Pradesh and 09th Legislative Assembly of Uttar Pradesh, in office from March 1974 to November 1989.
