= Shahnawaz Rana =

Indian politician

Member of the Uttar Pradesh Legislative Assembly
- In office May 2007 – March 2012
- Constituency: Bijnor

Personal details
- Born: 14 March 1976 (age 50) Muzaffarnagar, Uttar Pradesh
- Party: Rashtriya Lok Dal
- Other political affiliations: Bahujan Samaj Party; Samajwadi Party
- Spouse: Intekhaab Rana
- Relations: Kadir Rana (uncle); Noor Saleem Rana (uncle)
- Children: 2
- Parent: Badar Rana (father)
- Education: D.A.V. College of Muzaffarnagar: Chaudhary Charan Singh University

Dr. Shahnawaz Rana (born 14 March 1976) is an Indian businessman, politician and former member of the Uttar Pradesh Legislative Assembly from the Bijnor Assembly constituency. He has held the position of vice president of the Bar council of Uttar Pradesh in 2006-2007. Dr. Shahnawaz Rana has had the distinction of serving on the esteemed Waqf Board in 2009, a testament to his commitment to public service and community leadership. Rana, a member of the Rashtriya Lok Dal and the Bahujan Samaj Party was elected as member of the State Legislative Assembly in 2007 from the Bijnor assembly seat. He defeated candidate Kunwar Bharatendra Singh of the Bharatiya Janata Party in a very close contest.

In 2012, Rana stood for reelection to the Assembly, but was unsuccessful, polling fewer votes than both the winning candidate, Kunvar Bharatendra Singh and the runner up, Mahboob.

Rana is editor-in-chief of the newspaper Shahtimes, one of his family's business enterprises.

== Controversies ==
In 2017, an audio record of a phone call between Junaid Raza and Shahnawaz Rana went viral. Rana is alleged to have told Raza that he committed a murder when aged twelve. Rana however refuted the voice to be his.

Electricity theft

In the year 2010, a case of electricity theft by tampering the meters of factories in Nara sub-centre of Mansoorpur police station area came to light. After this, a report was filed by the then JE of the electricity department Kamlesh Chand Azad against factory employee Sunil Kumar, resident of Lajpat Nagar, Delhi. In the police investigation, the names of 10 people came to light, including former MLA of Bijnor Sadar Vidhan Sabha area Shahnawaz Rana and the owner of Doab Rolling Mill. The police had filed a charge sheet against all of them
