= Anil Kumar (Uttar Pradesh politician) =

Indian politician (born 1975)

Minister of Science & Technology Government of Uttar Pradesh
- Incumbent
- Assumed office 5 March 2024
- Governor: Anandiben Patel
- Chief Minister: Yogi Adityanath
- Preceded by: Yogendra Upadhyaya

Member of the Uttar Pradesh Legislative Assembly
- Incumbent
- Assumed office March 2022
- Preceded by: Pramod Utwal
- Constituency: Purqazi
- In office March 2012 – March 2017
- Succeeded by: Pramod Utwal
- Constituency: Purqazi
- In office May 2007 – March 2012
- Preceded by: Uma Kiran
- Succeeded by: Noor Saleem Rana
- Constituency: Charthawal

Personal details
- Born: 25 November 1975 (age 50) Taharpur, Saharanpur district, Uttar Pradesh
- Party: Rashtriya Lok Dal (2022-present)
- Other political affiliations: Samajwadi Party (2017-2022) BSP (2002-2019)
- Spouse: Beermati
- Children: Two daughters
- Profession: Agriculturist & politician

Anil Kumar is an Indian politician from Uttar Pradesh and current Cabinet Minister in Government of Uttar Pradesh. He is a Member of the Uttar Pradesh Legislative Assembly. Kumar represented the Purqazi constituency of Uttar Pradesh and is a member of the Rashtriya Lok Dal.

== Early life and education ==
Anil Kumar was born in Village Taharpur, Saharanpur district, Uttar Pradesh, on 25 November 1975. Kumar belongs to Chamar Dalit (SC category). His education is intermediate. Before joining politics, he was an agriculturist.

== Political career ==
Anil Kumar has been a MLA for three terms. He currently represents Purqazi (Assembly constituency) and is a member of Rashtriya Lok Dal.

== Posts held ==
#	From	To	Position	Comments
01	2007	2012	Member, 15th Legislative Assembly	Charthawal
02	2012	Mar-2017	Member, 16th Legislative Assembly	Purqazi
03	2017	Incumbent	Member, 18th Uttar Pradesh Assembly	Purqazi

== See also ==
- Bahujan Samaj Party
- Politics of India
- Purqazi (Assembly constituency)
- Fifteenth Legislative Assembly of Uttar Pradesh
- Sixteenth Legislative Assembly of Uttar Pradesh
- Uttar Pradesh Legislative Assembly
