= Amrita Basu =

American academic

Amrita Basu is an American academic and political scientist. She currently is a professor at Amherst College where she holds affiliations in the departments of Political Science, Sexuality, Women's, & Gender Studies, Asian Languages & Civilizations, and Black Studies.

== Early life ==
Amrita Basu was born in December 1953 in New York. Her parents worked for the United Nations. Her mother worked on various issues relating to women, and her father worked on issues pertaining to economics.

== Education and career ==
Basu obtained her bachelor's degree in government with a minor in Asian studies from Cornell University in 1975. In 1977, Basu obtained her master's degree in political science from Columbia University with a certificate from the South Asian Institute. Basu graduated from Columbia University with a Ph.D. in political science in 1984.

Starting in 1981, Basu has taught in the political science department at Amherst College, first as an assistant professor. In addition, she served as a visiting scholar at Columbia University during the 1986-1987 academic year. In 1988, she was promoted to associate professor at Amherst College. In 1994 she was promoted to professor at Amherst College, where she continues to serve. In 2003 her position was endowed as the Domenic J. Paino 1955 Professor of Political Science and Sexuality, Women's, & Gender Studies.

From 2001-2005 she served as the Director of the Five Colleges Women's Studies Research Center. From 2007 to 2010 she served as the Associate Dean of Faculty at Amherst College.

== Academic honours and fellowships ==
In 1975, Amrita Basu was awarded with the Columbia University Fellowship and in 1979, she was awarded the Pre-Doctoral Junior Fellowship by the American Institute of Indian Studies. In 1980, she was bestowed with the Dissertation Fellowship by the Woodrow Wilson Foundation. From 1981 to 1983, she undertook the Faculty Development Project, Black Studies/Women Studies and in 1984, she was felicitated with Karl Loewenstein Fellowship, Amherst College. In 1990, Basu was awarded the Fulbright Commission Senior Fellowship which she declined. In the same year, was endowed with American Institute of Indian Studies Senior Fellowship. In 1991 she received the Senior Fellowship from Social Science Research Council and was also awarded with the Amherst College Research Award for the academic years 1991-1992, 1993-1994 and 1997-1998. In 1992 and 1993, she was awarded the Five College Asian-American Studies Curriculum Development Grant and Peace and the World Security Studies Curriculum Development Grant respectively. In 1993, she was rewarded with John D & Catherine T. MacArthur Foundation, Research and Writing Award. In 1994, she was felicitated with Peace and World Security Studies Program Curriculum Development Grant and in 1995 she was granted the right to convene a conference on Political Violence in India at The United States Institute for Peace. In 1998, she was awarded with the Ford Foundation Curriculum Development Grant. She was awarded the Distinguished Teaching Award at Amherst College in 2008, and she was conferred as the Commencement Speaker, Senior Assembly, Amherst College. She also served on the Social Sciences jury for the Infosys Prize in 2012.

== Publications ==
=== Books ===
- Basu, Amrita. "Violent Conjunctures in Democratic India" (Cambridge University Press, Contentious Politics

Series, 2015)

- Basu, Amrita. Two Faces of Protest: Contrasting Modes of Women’s Activism in India. University of California Press and Oxford University Press: New Delhi, 1992
- Basu, Amrita, ed, The Challenge of Local Feminisms: Women’s Movements in Global Perspective. Boulder: Westview Press, 1995 and New Delhi: Kali for Women, 1998
- Basu, Amrita, co-ed. Community Conflicts and the State in India. Delhi: Oxford University Press, 1997
- Basu, Amrita, co-ed. Appropriating Gender: Women’s Activism and Politicized Religion in South Asia. New York: Routledge and New Delhi: Kali for Women, 1998
- Basu, Amrita, co-ed. Localizing Knowledge in a Globalizing World. Syracuse University Press, 2002
- Basu, Amrita, co-ed, Beyond Exceptionalism: Violence, Religion and Democracy in India. Seagull Press: New Delhi and London, 2006
- Basu, Amrita, ed, Women's Movements in the Global Era: The Power of Local Feminisms. Westview Press: Boulder, CO, 2010.

== See also ==
- Feminist economics
- List of feminist economists
