= Kunwar Satya Vir =

Indian politician

03rd Legislative Assembly of Uttar Pradesh
- In office Mar 1962 – Mar 1967

07th Legislative Assembly of Uttar Pradesh
- In office Feb 1977 – Jun 1980

04th Legislative Assembly of Uttar Pradesh
- In office Mar 1967 – Apr 1968

Personal details
- Party: Indian National Congress

Kunwar Satya Vir is an Indian politician who was a member of the 3rd 4th and 7th Legislative Assembly of Uttar Pradesh as a member of the Indian National Congress representing Bijnor Assembly constituency.
