= Dehra, Uttar Pradesh =

Coordinates: 28.5936850290°N 78.054923338°E

Dehra
- village
- Interactive map of Dehra
- Country: India
- State: Uttar Pradesh

Government
  - Body: Gram panchayat

Population
  - Total: 8,000

Languages
  - Official: Hindi
- Time zone: UTC+5:30 (IST)
- Vehicle registration: UP 37

Dehra is a village in near Dhaulana, Uttar Pradesh, India. It is located in the Hapur district, about 60 km east of Delhi via the NH-24 highway.
