= Raja Gazaffar =

Indian politician

Raja Gazanffar Ali Khan

Member of the Uttar Pradesh Legislative Assembly
- In office 1996–2002

Cabinet Minister of UttarPradesh

4th Raja Kiratpur Bijnor state

Personal details
- Party: Bahujan Samaj Party

Raja Gazanffar Ali Khan is an Indian politician and a member of the 1996 Uttar Pradesh Legislative Assembly election who represents the Bijnor (Assembly constituency) constituency Uttar Pradesh party Bahujan Samaj Party in office October 1996 and May 2002.

== Death ==
He died in 2014 due to prolonged illness, after hearing the news of which Akhilesh Yadav Mayawati expressed his condolences by tweeting

== Achievements ==
Tribute was paid to former State Minister Raja Ghazanfar Ali Khan, former President of Muslim Fund Kiratpur and founder of Maulana Mohammad Ali Johar Higher Education Institute, on his sixth death anniversary.

Apart from Muslim Fund office, branches Bhojpur, Chandpur, Jalalabad, Mandawar, Bijnor etc., Isale Sawab was conveyed by reciting Quran in educational institutions like Maulana Mohammad Ali Higher Education Institute Kiratpur, Maryam Girls College, Maryam Higher Secondary School, Maryam Convent Primary School, Madrasa Maryam Islamic School etc. and his contribution was remembered
