= Dinesh Khatik =

Indian politician

Minister of state for Jal Shakti Government of Uttar Pradesh
- Incumbent
- Assumed office 26 September 2021
- Chief Minister: Yogi Adityanath
- Minister: Mahendra Kumar Singh; Swatantra Dev Singh

Member of the Uttar Pradesh Legislative Assembly
- Incumbent
- Assumed office 2017
- Preceded by: Prabhu Dayal Balmiki
- Constituency: Hastinapur

Personal details
- Born: 11 August 1977 (age 48) Ambedkar (Phalavada), Meerut
- Party: Bharatiya Janata Party
- Spouse: Aarti (m. 2006)
- Children: 1 son, 1 daughter
- Parent: Shri Devendra Kumar (father)
- Profession: Politician, Businessman

Dinesh Khatik is an Indian politician and a member of the 17th Legislative Assembly of Uttar Pradesh representing the Hastinapur constituency and was a member of the Bhartiya Janata Party.

== Early life and education ==
Dinesh Khatik married Aarti in 2006 and was educated till 9th class.

== Political career ==
Dinesh Khatik is an Indian politician and a member of the Legislative Assembly of Uttar Pradesh representing the Hastinapur constituency and was a member of the Bhartiya Janata Party. He is currently a state minister in Uttar Pradesh government.
