= Atiqur Rehman =

Indian politician

Atiqur

MLA, 04th Legislative Assembly
- In office 1967–1974
- Constituency: Nagina

MLA, 05th Legislative Assembly

Personal details
- Citizenship: Indian
- Party: Indian National Congress
- Occupation: MLA

Atiqur Rehman is an Uttar Pradesh politician and member of Indian National Congress. He represented Nagina (Assembly constituency) 4th and 5th Legislative Assembly of Uttar Pradesh, serving from March 1967 to March 1974.
