= Munshiram Singh =

Indian politician

Member of Parliament, Lok Sabha
- In office 2004–2009
- Preceded by: Sheesh Ram Singh Ravi
- Succeeded by: Sanjay Singh Chauhan
- Constituency: Bijnor

Personal details
- Born: 16 February 1959 (age 67) Nagina, Bijnor district, Uttar Pradesh
- Party: Samajwadi party
- Other political affiliations: Rashtriya Lok Dal; Bahujan Samaj Party
- Spouse: Saroj Bala
- As of 18 August, 2008

Munshiram Singh is an Indian politician from the Samajwadi Party and member of the 15th Lok Sabha from Bijnor as member of Rashtriya Lok Dal.
