= Mithlesh Pal =

Indian politician

MLA 18th Legislative Assembly
- Incumbent
- Assumed office 23 November 2024
- Preceded by: Chandan Chauhan
- Constituency: Meerapur

MLA 15th Legislative Assembly
- In office 2009–2012
- Preceded by: Kadir Rana
- Constituency: Morna

Personal details
- Born: 19 June 1961 (age 64) Muzaffarnagar district, Uttar Pradesh
- Citizenship: India
- Party: Rashtriya Lok Dal
- Spouse: Amarnath Pal
- Children: Supriya Pal (Daughter)
- Profession: Agriculturist & Politician
- Website: up.gov.in

Mithlesh Pal is an Indian politician and a member of the 18th Legislative Assembly of Uttar Pradesh of India. She represents the Meerapur constituency of Uttar Pradesh and is a member of the Rashtriya Lok Dal political party.
