= Bijnor =

- City
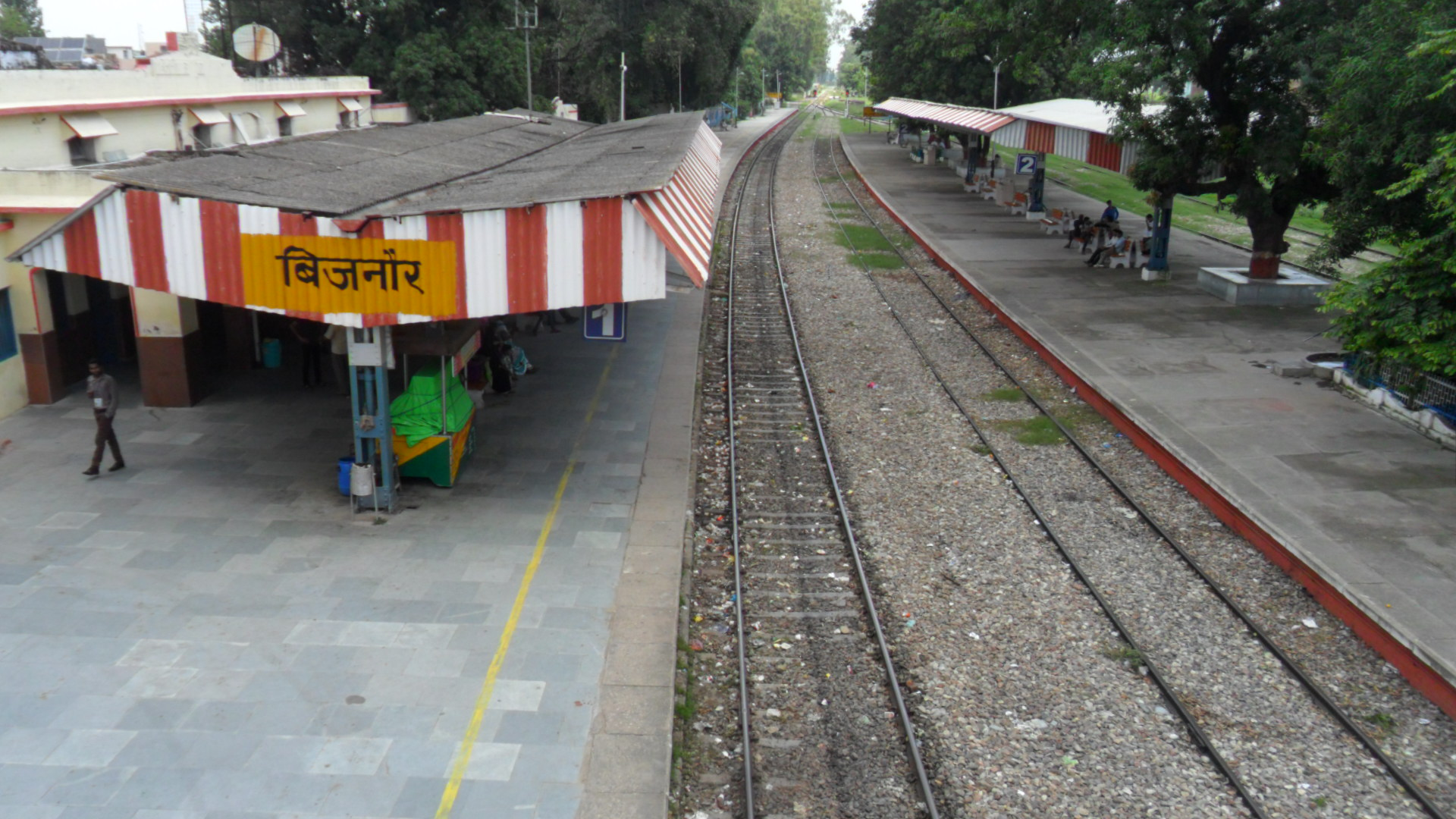
- View of Bijnor railway station in Bijnor, UP

- Location in Uttar Pradesh Bijnor (India) Bijnor (Asia)
- Coordinates: 29.37°N 78.13°E
- Country: India
- State: Uttar Pradesh
- District: Bijnor

Government
  - MLA: Suchi (BJP)
- Elevation: 225 m (738 ft)

Population (2011)
  - Total: 115,381

Language
  - Official: Hindi
  - Additional official: Urdu
  - Native: Khariboli
- Time zone: UTC+5:30 (IST)
- Vehicle registration: UP-20
- Website: www.bijnor.nic.in

Bijnor (Hindi pronunciation: [bɪd͡ʒ.n̪ɔːɾ]) is a city and a municipal board in Bijnor district in the state of Uttar Pradesh, India.

== History ==
=== Indus Valley Civilization ===
Alamgirpur, also called "Parasaram Ka Khera", is an archaeological site of the Indus Valley Civilization that thrived along Yamuna River (c. 3300–1300 BC) from the Harappan-Bara period, located in Meerut district, Uttar Pradesh. It is the easternmost site of the civilisation. It was partially excavated in 1958 and 1959 by Archaeological Survey of India, that found four cultural periods with intervening breaks; the earliest of them represented by a thickness of 6 feet, belonged to Harappan Culture. Although kiln burnt bricks were in evidence, no structure of this period was found, probably due to the limited nature of the excavations. Brick sizes were, 11.25 to 11.75 in. in length,5.25 to 6.25 in. in breadth and 2.5 to 2.75 in. in thickness; larger bricks averaged 14 in. x 8 in.x 4 in. which were used in furnace only. Typical Harappan pottery was found and the complex itself appeared to be a pottery workshop. Ceramic items found included roof tiles, dishes, cups, vases, cubical dice, beads, terracotta cakes, carts and figurines of a humped bull and a snake. There were also beads and possibly ear studs made of steatite paste, faience, glass, carnelian, quartz, agate and black jasper. Little metal was in evidence. However, a broken blade made of copper was found.

=== Medieval history ===
King Bijli Pasi is credited as the founder of the city of Bijnor in Uttar Pradesh. Pasi consolidated his position when northern India was divided into several small states, before the fall of the mighty empires of the past.

During the reign of Emperor Akbar, Bijnor was part of his Mughal Empire. During the early 18th century, the Rohilla Pashtuns established their independent fiefdom in the area called by the Rohilkhand. Around 1748, the Rohilla chief Ali Mohammed Khan made his first annexations in Bijnor, the rest of which soon fell under the Rohilla domination. The northern districts were granted by Ali Mohammed Khan to Khurshid Ahmed Baig, who gradually extended his influence west of the Ganges and at Delhi, receiving the title of Najib-ud-daula with the position of the paymaster of the Mughal forces. Marathas invaded Bijnor who was also instigated by enemies of Rohillas, leading to several battles. Rohilla chief, Najib, who sided with Ahmad Shah Abdali in Panipat, was made vizier of the empire.

== Geography ==
=== Climate ===
Climate data for Bijnor, Uttar Pradesh
| Month | Jan | Feb | Mar | Apr | May | Jun | Jul | Aug | Sep | Oct | Nov | Dec | Year |
|---|---|---|---|---|---|---|---|---|---|---|---|---|---|
| Mean daily maximum °C (°F) | 20.8 (69.4) | 23.7 (74.7) | 29.6 (85.3) | 35.9 (96.6) | 39.5 (103.1) | 38.7 (101.7) | 34.4 (93.9) | 33.4 (92.1) | 33.6 (92.5) | 32.6 (90.7) | 27.9 (82.2) | 22.5 (72.5) | 31.1 (88.0) |
| Daily mean °C (°F) | 13.7 (56.7) | 16.5 (61.7) | 21.9 (71.4) | 28.0 (82.4) | 31.9 (89.4) | 32.8 (91.0) | 30.2 (86.4) | 29.5 (85.1) | 28.8 (83.8) | 25.6 (78.1) | 20.0 (68.0) | 15.1 (59.2) | 24.5 (76.1) |
| Mean daily minimum °C (°F) | 6.7 (44.1) | 9.3 (48.7) | 14.2 (57.6) | 20.1 (68.2) | 24.4 (75.9) | 26.9 (80.4) | 26.1 (79.0) | 25.5 (77.9) | 24 (75) | 18.7 (65.7) | 12.2 (54.0) | 7.6 (45.7) | 18.0 (64.4) |
| Average precipitation mm (inches) | 21.9 (0.86) | 18.6 (0.73) | 14.0 (0.55) | 9.3 (0.37) | 17.2 (0.68) | 81.8 (3.22) | 243.0 (9.57) | 267.4 (10.53) | 136.3 (5.37) | 18.9 (0.74) | 5.1 (0.20) | 7.9 (0.31) | 841.3 (33.12) |
| Average precipitation days | 1.8 | 1.5 | 1.4 | 1.1 | 1.4 | 3.3 | 8.8 | 9.4 | 4.1 | 1.2 | 0.6 | 0.9 | 35.5 |
Source: Weatherbase

== Demographics ==
Historical population
| Year | Pop. | ±% |
|---|---|---|
| 1901 | 17,583 | — |
| 1911 | 17,439 | −0.8% |
| 1921 | 18,095 | +3.8% |
| 1931 | 23,520 | +30.0% |
| 1941 | 27,900 | +18.6% |
| 1951 | 30,646 | +9.8% |
| 1961 | 33,821 | +10.4% |
| 1971 | 43,290 | +28.0% |
| 1981 | 56,713 | +31.0% |
| 1991 | 66,486 | +17.2% |
| 2001 | 79,346 | +19.3% |
| 2011 | 93,297 | +17.6% |

As per the 2011 census, Bijnor urban agglomeration had a population of 115,381, including 60,656 males and 54,725 females. The effective literacy rate (7+ population) was 77.90 per cent.

== Government and politics ==
Nagar Palika Parishad Bijnor is the local governing body of Bijnor city.

Bijnor district administration is headed by the district magistrate and collector (DM) of Bijnor, an IAS officer, who reports to the divisional commissioner of Moradabad. The DM is in charge of property records and revenue collection for the central government and oversees the elections held in the city. The DM is also responsible for maintaining law and order in the city, and is assisted by two additional district magistrates and several other officers.

Bijnor district comes under the Bareilly Police Zone and Moradabad Police Range. The district police is headed by a superintendent of police (SP), who is an IPS officer, and is assisted by two additional superintendents of police for city and east from the Provincial Police Service. Each of the several police circles is headed by a circle officer in the rank of deputy superintendent of police.

Bijnor has a District Court under the High Court of Judicature of Allahabad. The court is headed by the district judge of Bijnor, who is assisted by numerous additional district judges, civil judges and additional civil judges.

== In popular culture ==
- The Hindi drama series Yahan Ke Hum Sikandar was set in Bijnor.
- IPTA Bijnor is active in nukkad natak on civic issues.

== Notable people ==
- Asaf Ali, freedom fighter and first ambassador to United States of America
- Abdur Rahman Bijnori, Indian Urdu poet and scholar
- Marghubur Rahman, vice-chancellor of Darul Uloom Deoband
- Dushyant Kumar - Indian poet of modern Hindi literature

== See also ==
- List of cities in Uttar Pradesh
- Dehra, Uttar Pradesh
- Bijnor railway station
- Bijnor (Assembly constituency)
- Bijnor (Lok Sabha constituency)
- 1990 Bijnor riot
- Indira Park, Bijnor
