= Suchi (politician) =

Indian politician

Suchi Chaudhary

Member of the Uttar Pradesh Legislative Assembly
- Incumbent
- Assumed office 2017
- Preceded by: Ruchi Vira
- Constituency: Bijnor, Uttar Pradesh

Personal details
- Party: Bharatiya Janata Party
- Occupation: MLA
- Profession: Politician

Suchi Chaudhary is an Indian politician and is a member of the 18th Legislative Assembly and has earlier been part of the 17th Legislative Assembly of Uttar Pradesh of India. She represents the Bijnor constituency in Bijnor district of Uttar Pradesh.

== Political career ==
Suchi contested Uttar Pradesh Assembly Election as Bharatiya Janata Party candidate and defeated her close contestant Ruchi Veera from Samajwadi Party with a margin of 27,281 votes.

== Posts held ==
#	From	To	Position	Comments
01	2017	2022	Member, 17th Legislative Assembly	
01	2022	Incumbent	Member, 18th Legislative Assembly of Uttar Pradesh	
