= Pant (surname) =

- Language: Garhwali, Hindi, Kumaoni, Marathi, Nepali

Origin
- Region of origin: Uttarakhand, Maharashtra, Nepal

Other names
- Alternative spelling: Panta

Pant (Sanskrit: पंत) or Panta (Nepali: पन्त) is a last name, commonly found in Nepal and in the Indian states of Uttarakhand and Maharashtra. It is a traditional surname used by Brahmins, a priestly community. Foremostly involved in the activities of the state, they were generally found involved in activities such as academics, religion, management, politics and warfare.

== In India ==
Pant was used as a last name, suffix or title commonly by priests, as well as the officers, commanders, ministers and leaders of high influence in the affairs of the state. In Uttarakhand, many Brahmin communities use this as surname. In Maharashtra, Brahmin groups who have used the term as part of their names usually belong to either of the 3 Brahminical groups such as Deshastha, Chitpavan and Karhade.

== In Nepal ==
Pant people are also found in good numbers in Nepal. They are ethnically same as the Pant people of Uttarakhand. Usually being amongst the chief-office bearers in the kings courts along with the majority Pande rank holders, they were foremostly involved in affairs that concerned with education (also medicine), administration and warfare.

== Notable people ==
- Aditi Pant (born 1943), Indian oceanographer
- Aditya Bhushan Pant, Indian toxicologist and neurobiologist
- Anju Panta, Nepali singer
- Apa Pant (1912–1992), Indian diplomat, Prince of Aundh, Gandhian, writer and freedom fighter
- Bhimdatta Panta (1926–1953), Nepalese revolutionary leader and martyr
- Buddhi Prasad Pant, Nepalese politician
- Chandra Pant (born 1968), Indian politician and former teacher
- Devidutt Pant (1907–1982), Indian freedom fighter
- Dilli Raj Pant, Nepalese politician
- Garima Panta, Nepalese actress
- Govind Ballabh Pant (1887–1961), Indian politician and independence activist
- Hargovind Pant (1885–1957), Indian politician
- Hari Pant, General of the Maratha Empire
- Ila Pant (born 1938), Indian politician
- K. C. Pant (1931–2012), Indian politician
- Kailash Chandra Pant (born 1936), Indian writer and journalist
- Kamala Panta, Nepali politician
- Kamla Pant (born 1956), Indian feminist, politician, and activist
- Lokeshwar Singh Panta (born 1944), Indian judge
- M. C. Pant (1956–2015), Indian radiation oncologist
- Maheshwar Panta (18th century), Nepalese Army chief
- Manoj Pant, Indian economist
- Maya Panta, Nepalese politician
- Meghna Pant, Indian author, journalist and speaker
- Muktesh Pant (born 1954), Indian businessman
- Naresh Dev Pant (born 1974), Graphic designer and artist
- Naya Raj Pant (1913–2002), Nepalese polymath
- Nilamber Pant (born 1931), Indian scientist
- Pitambar Pant (died 1973), Indian independence activist
- Prafulla Chandra Pant (born 1952), Indian judge
- Prakash Pant (1960–2019), Indian politician and pharmacist
- Pushpesh Pant (born 1947), Indian food critic and historian
- Raghuji Pant, Nepalese politician
- Rajiv Pant (born 1974), Executive, product designer, and engineer
- Ram Raj Pant (1920–1993), Nepalese linguist
- Ranjan Pant (born 1959), Indian advisor
- Rishabh Pant (born 1997), Indian cricketer
- Santosh Panta, Nepalese actor, comedian, screenwriter, and director
- Sharmila Kumari Panta, Nepalese politician
- Sorabh Pant (born 1981), Indian stand-up comedian and writer
- Sudhansh Pant, Former Chief Secretary of Rajasthan
- Sumitranandan Pant (1900–1977), Indian writer
- Sunil Babu Pant (born 1972), Nepali human rights activist, monk and politician
- Surakshya Panta, Nepalese actress
- Urbadutta Pant, Nepalese politician
- Yadav Pant (1928–2007), Nepali politician

== See also ==
- Pant (disambiguation)
