= Pant =

Pant may refer to:

== Clothing ==
- Pants or trousers, an article of outer clothing worn on the lower half of the body, it comes in a variety of shapes like narrow, slim fit, baggy pants and many others.
- Underpants, an item of underwear

== Places ==
- Pant, Denbighshire, Wales; a township of Llysfaen
- Pant, Merthyr Tydfil, Wales
- Pant, Shropshire, England
- Pant, Wrexham, Wales; an electoral ward in Wrexham County Borough
- River Pant, upper part of the River Blackwater, Essex, England

== Other uses ==
- Pant (surname), a North Indian and Nepalese surname
- Pant, a horror character created by Indian writer Narayan Dharap
- Annette Island Airport (ICAO: PANT)

== See also ==
- Pant railway station (disambiguation)
- Panting (disambiguation)
