= Ranjan Pant =

Indian advisor

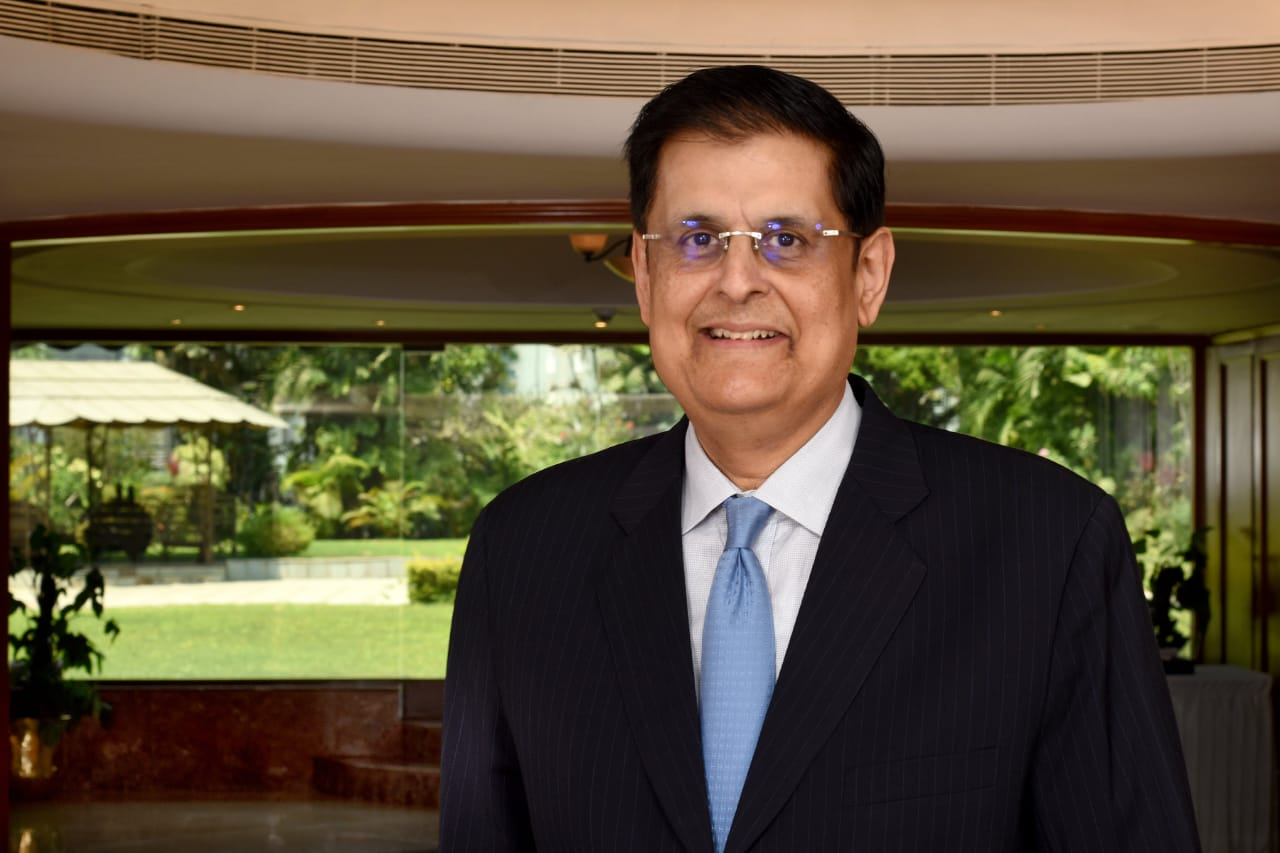
- Ranjan Pant
- Born: 29 June 1959 (age 67); Delhi, India
- Education: BITS Pilani, Wharton School
- Occupation: CEO Advisor at Ranjan Pant Consulting
- Spouse: Asha Pant
- Father: K. C. Pant

Ranjan Pant is an Indian strategy management consultant, advisor to CEOs and a change management expert. Pant is an Investment Committee member of a leading Corporate Private Equity House and an independent director on the Boards of several major companies

He is the son of K. C. Pant, who was an Indian politician and cabinet minister in the federal Government of India holding the portfolios such as Minister of Defence, Finance, Steel and Heavy Engineering, Home Affairs, Electronics, Atomic Energy and Science and Technology.

Pant is the grandson of legendary Indian freedom fighter Pandit Govind Ballabh Pant, who along with Mahatma Gandhi and Jawaharlal Nehru was a key figure in the fight for Independence from the British crown.

== Early life and education ==
Ranjan Pant was born in Delhi, India, on 29 June 1959, to K. C. Pant and Ila Pant. He earned a Bachelor in Mechanical Engineering Honors degree from BITS Pilani and an MBA from The Wharton School, University of Pennsylvania.

== Professional career ==
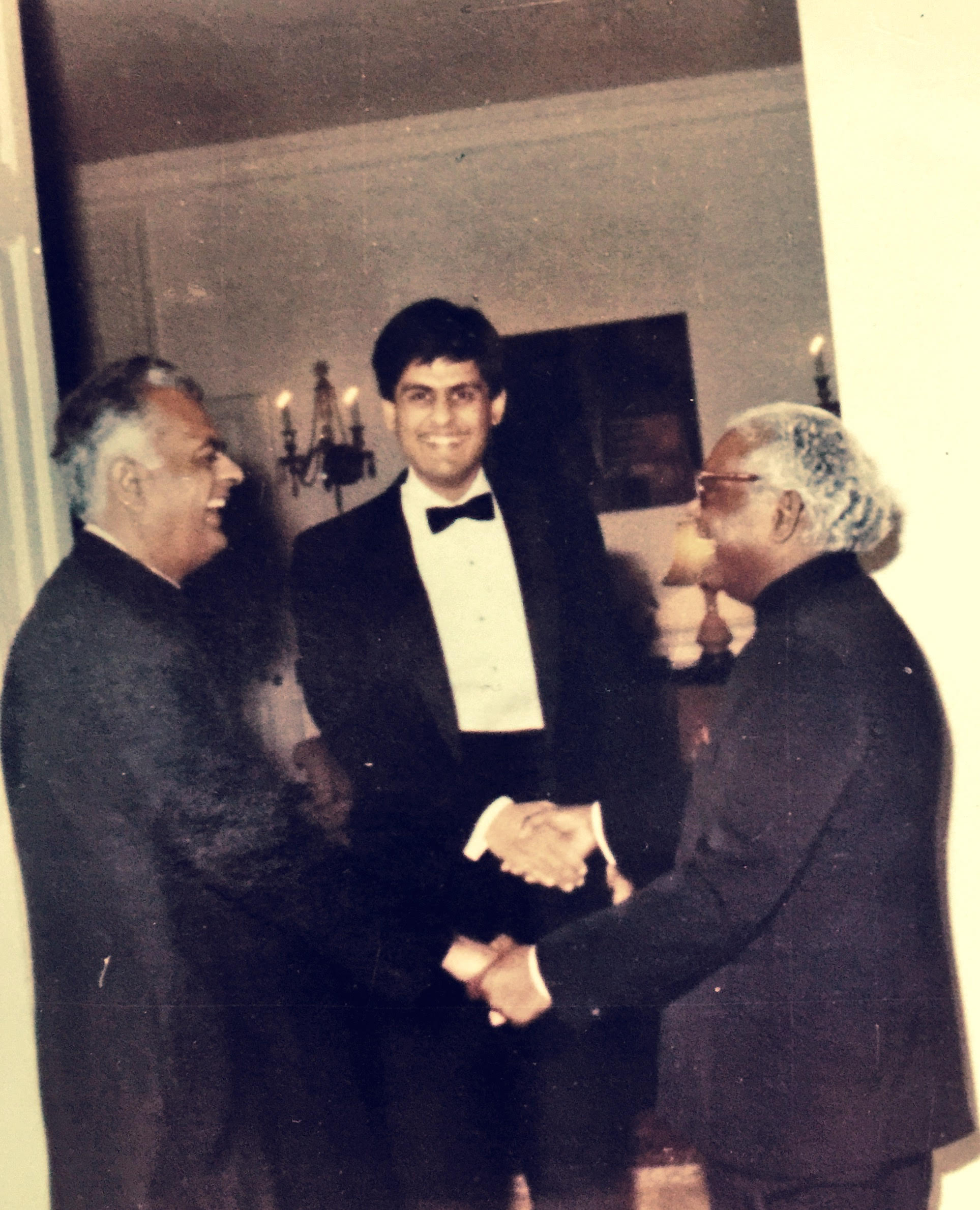
Ranjan Pant (center), with the former President of India – K R Narayanan (right) & K C Pant (left)

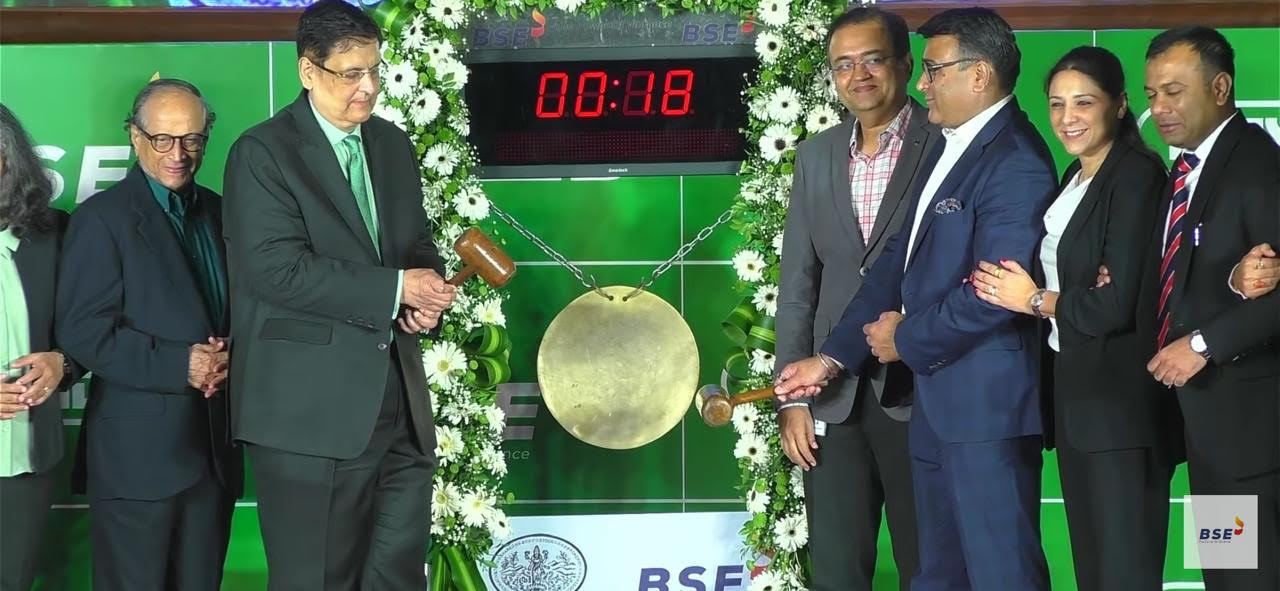
Ranjan Pant, Chairman - Schneider Electric President Systems, ringing BSE bell at company IPO

In early professional life, Pant joined Bain & Co as a Management Consultant and later moved as Director of Corporate Business Development at the General Electric headquarters in Fairfield. After that, he rejoined Bain as a Partner leading the global energy and utilities practice.

Pant is currently an Independent Board Director in leading companies in the energy, mutual funds, textile, information technology and manufacturing sectors. He also served as an Independent Board Director of a Life Insurance company, Retail company, and an Indian Navratna.

In 2024, Pant was appointed as an additional director on the board of Mahindra and Mahindra Ltd.

Pant has also served as an Executive in Residence at Babson College and is a charter member of TiE. He has also long been member of the jury panel for K C Mahindra Education Trust scholarships for post graduate studies for Indian students.

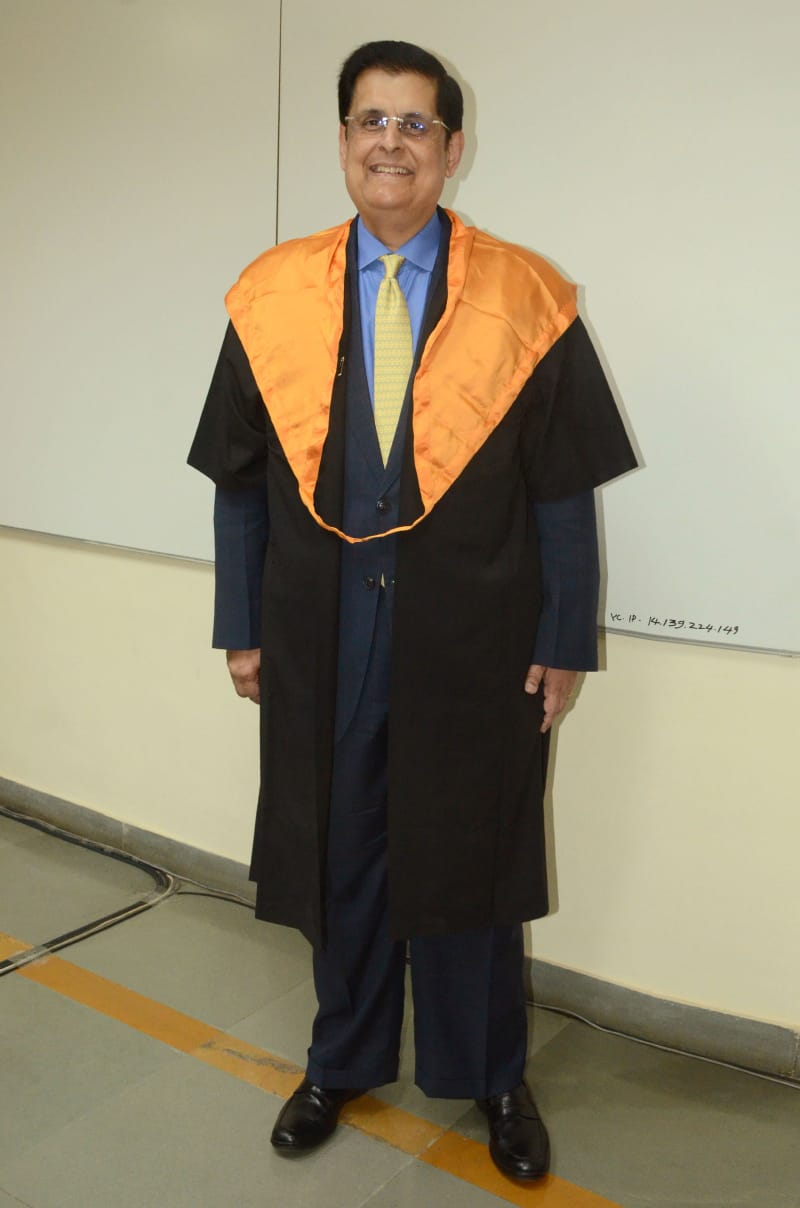
Ranjan Pant, at IIM Indore Convocation, 2019

In year 2019, Ranjan was appointed to the Board of Governors of the Indian Institute of Management Indore (IIM-Indore).

In year 2022, he was appointed on the governing body ofMahindra University

== Talks and Insights ==
Ranjan has delivered multiple keynote presentations at India Inc. Some of the notable insights were:

1. "Respect ego in public, but don't in private" – FICCI Innovation Summit, Delhi, 2019
2. "Learn satisficing instead of satisfying everyone" – Mahindra, Mumbai, 2018
3. "Fostering High performance through creativity" – School of Inspired Leadership, January 2022, Zoom
