= Deputy Chairman of the Planning Commission =

Government role in Indian commission

Deputy Chairman of Planning Commission
- Emblem of India

- Flag of India

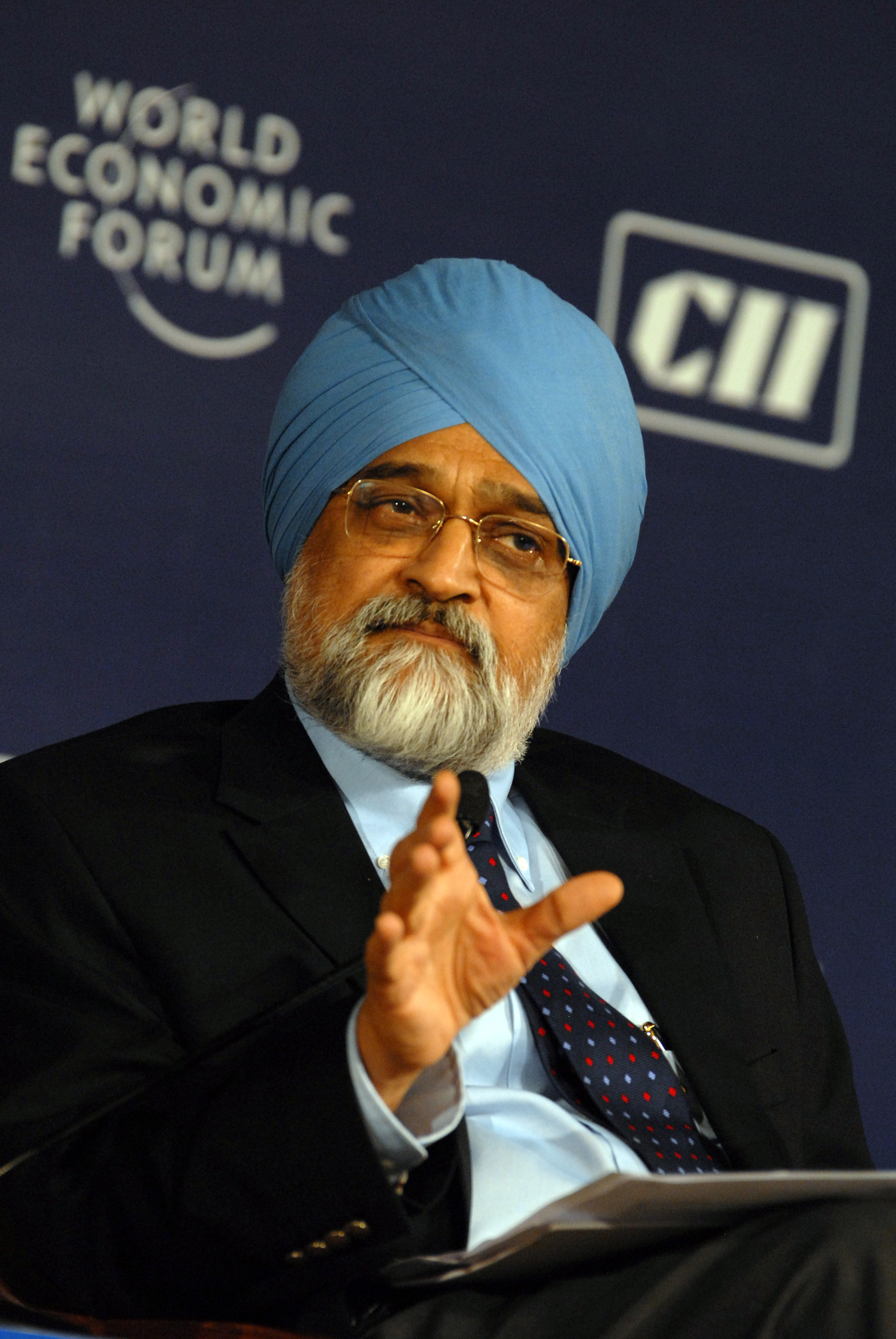
- Last in office Montek Singh Ahluwalia; 6 July 2004 – 26 May 2014
- Status: Abolished
- Appointer: Prime Minister of India
- Term length: Five years
- Inaugural holder: Gulzarilal Nanda
- Formation: 17 February 1957 (69 years ago)
- Final holder: Montek Singh Ahluwalia
- Abolished: 25 May 2014 (12 years ago)

Since the Prime Minister of India happened to be the ex-officio chairperson of Planning Commission of India, the position of the deputy chairperson had great significance.

From 1957 until 2014 23 persons have served as the deputy chairmen, but any woman not served in this post. The deputy chairmen Gulzarilal Nanda, P. V. Narasimha Rao and Manmohan Singh who served as Prime Minister of India. (Note: Nanda was the Acting prime minister) And Pranab Mukherjee who served this post in from 1991 to 1996, after served as the President of India. Two future chief ministers, former central ministers served in this post.

== List of Deputy Chairpersons of the Planning Commission ==
#	Portrait	Name	Term of office	
1		Gulzarilal Nanda	17 February 1953	21 September 1963
2		V. T. Krishnamachari	17 February 1953	21 June 1960
3		Chandulal Madhavlal Trivedi	22 September 1963	2 December 1963
4		Ashok Mehta	3 December 1963	1 September 1967
5		Dhananjay Ramchandra Gadgil	2 September 1967	1 May 1971
6		C. Subramaniam	2 May 1971	22 July 1972
7		D. P. Dhar	23 July 1972	31 December 1974
8		P. N. Haksar	4 January 1975	31 May 1977
9		D. T. Lakdawala	1 June 1977	15 February 1980
10		N. D. Tiwari	9 June 1980	8 August 1981
11		Shankarrao Chavan	9 August 1981	19 July 1984
12		Prakash Chandra Sethi	20 July 1984	31 October 1984
13		P. V. Narasimha Rao	1 November 1984	14 January 1985
14		Manmohan Singh	15 January 1985	31 August 1987
15		P. Shiv Shankar	25 July 1987	29 June 1988
16		Madhav Singh Solanki	30 June 1988	16 August 1989
17		Ramakrishna Hegde	5 December 1989	6 July 1990
18		Madhu Dandavate	7 July 1990	10 December 1990
19		Mohan Dharia	11 December 1990	24 June 1991
20		Pranab Mukherjee	24 June 1991	15 May 1996
21		Madhu Dandavate	1 August 1996	21 March 1998
22		Jaswant Singh	25 March 1998	4 February 1999
23		K. C. Pant	5 February 1999	17 June 2004
24		Montek Singh Ahluwalia	6 July 2004	26 May 2014

== See also ==
- NITI Aayog
