= Kashipur, Uttarakhand Assembly constituency =

Constituency of the Uttarakhand legislative assembly in India

Coordinates: 29.21°N 78.96°E

Kashipur
- Constituency No. 63 for the Uttarakhand Legislative Assembly

Constituency details
- Country: India
- Region: North India
- State: Uttarakhand
- District: Udham Singh Nagar
- Lok Sabha constituency: Nainital–Udhamsingh Nagar
- Total electors: 176,740
- Reservation: None

Member of Legislative Assembly
- 5th Uttarakhand Legislative Assembly
- Incumbent Trilok Singh Cheema
- Party: Bharatiya Janata Party
- Elected year: 2022

Kashipur Legislative Assembly constituency is one of the seventy electoral Uttarakhand Legislative Assembly constituencies of Uttarakhand state in India. It includes Kashipur area of Udhamsingh Nagar District.

Kashipur Legislative Assembly constituency is a part of Nainital-Udhamsingh Nagar (Lok Sabha constituency).

== Members of the Legislative Assembly ==
Election	Member	Party
1957	Lakshman Datt	Indian National Congress
1962	Devi Datt	Indian National Congress
1967	R. Datt	Praja Socialist Party
1969	N. D. Tiwari	Indian National Congress
1974	N. D. Tiwari	Indian National Congress
1977	N. D. Tiwari	Indian National Congress
1980	Satyendra Chandra Guria	Indian National Congress
1985	N. D. Tiwari	Indian National Congress
1987	Akbar Ahmad Dumpy	Independent politician
1989	K. C. Singh Baba	Independent politician
1991	Rajiv Kumar	Bharatiya Janata Party
1993	Rajiv Kumar	Bharatiya Janata Party
1996	K. C. Singh Baba	All India Indira Congress
Major boundary changes
2002	Harbhajan Singh Cheema	Bharatiya Janata Party
2007	Harbhajan Singh Cheema	Bharatiya Janata Party
Major boundary changes
2012	Harbhajan Singh Cheema	Bharatiya Janata Party
2017	Harbhajan Singh Cheema	Bharatiya Janata Party
2022	Trilok Singh Cheema	Bharatiya Janata Party

== Election results ==
=== 2027 Assembly election ===
2027 Uttarakhand Legislative Assembly election: Kashipur
Party	Candidate	Votes	%	±%
INC				
BJP				
AAP				
BSP				
NOTA	None of the above			
Majority				
Turnout				
gain from		Swing		

=== Assembly Election 2022 ===
2022 Uttarakhand Legislative Assembly election: Kashipur
Party	Candidate	Votes	%	±%
BJP	Trilok Singh Cheema	48,508	42.79	▼4.97
INC	Narendra Chand Singh	32,173	28.38	▼0.23
AAP	Deepak Bali	16,074	14.18	New
BSP	Gagan Singh Kamboj	14,332	12.64	▼2.05
UKD	Manoj Kumar Dobariyal	855	0.75	New
NOTA	None of the above	726	0.64	▲0.02
Margin of victory		16,335	14.41	▼4.74
Turnout		1,13,360	63.95	▼5.56
Registered electors		1,77,270		▲17.34
BJP hold		Swing	▼4.97	

=== Assembly Election 2017 ===
2017 Uttarakhand Legislative Assembly election: Kashipur
Party	Candidate	Votes	%	±%
BJP	Harbhajan Singh Cheema	50,156	47.76	▲9.05
INC	Manoj Joshi	30,042	28.61	▼7.20
BSP	Mohd Ashraf Siddiqui	15,426	14.69	▼1.43
Independent	Rajeev Kumar Agarwal	7,106	6.77	New
NOTA	None of the above	655	0.62	New
Margin of victory		20,114	19.15	▲16.25
Turnout		1,05,012	69.51	▲0.05
Registered electors		1,51,069		▲28.03
BJP hold		Swing	▲9.05	

=== Assembly Election 2012 ===
2012 Uttarakhand Legislative Assembly election: Kashipur
Party	Candidate	Votes	%	±%
BJP	Harbhajan Singh Cheema	31,734	38.72	▲5.05
INC	Manoj Joshi	29,352	35.81	▲19.14
BSP	Haseen Khan	13,211	16.12	▼0.29
URM	Mohd. Yamin Siddiqui	3,667	4.47	New
SP	Abdul Aziz Qureshi	1,216	1.48	▼15.79
Independent	Ram Vilas	1,074	1.31	New
RLD	Mohd. Anas Ansari	439	0.54	New
Margin of victory		2,382	2.91	▼13.48
Turnout		81,965	69.46	▲0.25
Registered electors		1,17,999		
BJP hold		Swing	▲5.05	

=== Assembly Election 2007 ===
2007 Uttarakhand Legislative Assembly election: Kashipur
Party	Candidate	Votes	%	±%
BJP	Harbhajan Singh Cheema	31,756	33.66	▲2.97
SP	Mohd. Zubair	16,295	17.27	▼0.86
INC	Satyendra Chandra Gudiya	15,722	16.67	▼13.70
BSP	Avatar Singh	15,474	16.40	▲2.14
Independent	Mukesh Mehrotra	11,520	12.21	New
Independent	Sanjeev Kumar	1,013	1.07	New
UKD	Rekha Chowdhary	619	0.66	New
Margin of victory		15,461	16.39	▲16.06
Turnout		94,334	69.21	▲14.45
Registered electors		1,36,302		
BJP hold		Swing	▲2.97	

=== Assembly Election 2002 ===
2002 Uttaranchal Legislative Assembly election: Kashipur
Party	Candidate	Votes	%	±%
BJP	Harbhajan Singh Cheema	18,396	30.69	
INC	K. C. Singh Baba	18,201	30.37	
SP	Avtar Singh	10,868	18.13	
BSP	Harish Negi	8,549	14.26	
LJP	Musharraf Husain	1,189	1.98	
Independent	Suresh Kumar	517	0.86	
Independent	Prem Kumar	361	0.60	
SJP(R)	Amarjeet Singh	303	0.51	
Margin of victory		195	0.33	
Turnout		59,933	54.76	
Registered electors		1,09,454		
