= Balraj Pasi =

Indian politician (born 1960)

Member of Parliament, Lok Sabha
- In office 1991-1996
- Preceded by: Mahendra Singh Pal
- Succeeded by: Narayan Dutt Tiwari
- Constituency: Nainital, Uttar Pradesh

Personal details
- Born: 4 January 1960 (age 66) Bholath, Kapurthala District, Punjab, India
- Party: Bharatiya Janata Party

Balraj Pasi is an Indian politician. He was elected to the Lok Sabha, the lower house of the Parliament of India from the Nainital constituency of Uttar Pradesh (now Uttarakhand) as a member of the Bharatiya Janata Party.
