= Pauri =

- Town
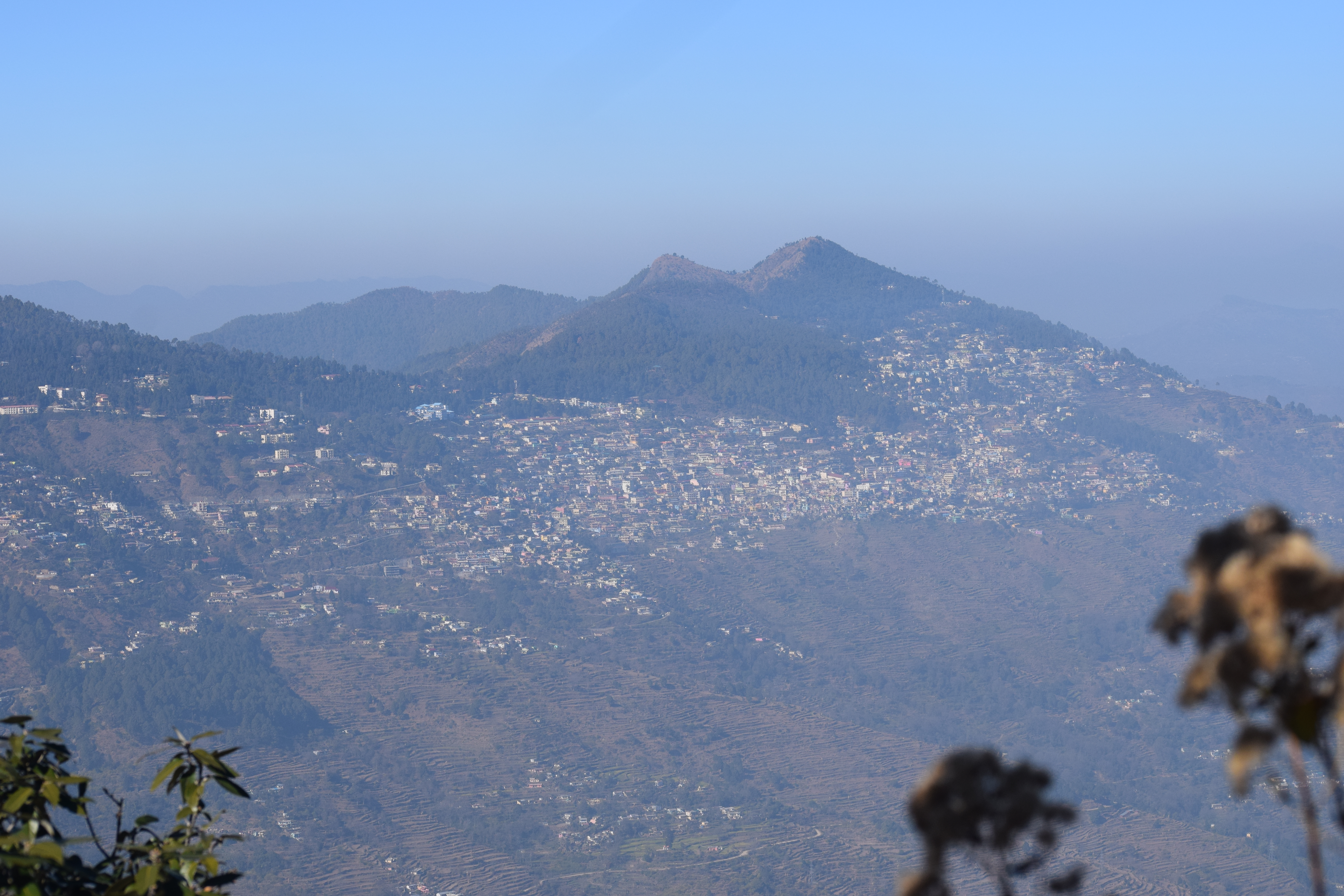
- Nickname: Garhwal
- Location in Uttarakhand, India Pauri (India)
- Coordinates: 30.15°N 78.78°E
- Country: India
- State: Uttarakhand
- District: Pauri Garhwal

Government
  - Body: NPP
  - DM: Smt.Swati S. Bhadauria, IAS
- Elevation: 1,765 m (5,791 ft)

Population (2011)
  - Total: 25,440
- Demonym: Garhwali

Languages
  - Official: Hindi
  - Native: Garhwali
- Time zone: UTC+5:30 (IST)
- PIN Code: 246001
- Telephone code: +91-1368
- Vehicle registration: UK-12
- Website: pauri.nic.in

Pauri is a town and a municipal board in Pauri Garhwal district in the Indian state of Uttarakhand. Pauri serves as the headquarters of the Garhwal Division and seat of the Divisional Commissioner.

== Geography ==
Pauri is located at 30.15°N 78.78°E. It is located 1,765 meters above sea level. Pauri provides a panoramic view of the snow-covered Himalayan peaks of Nanda Devi and Trisul, Gangotri Group, Thalaiya-Sagar, Nilkantha, Bandar Poonch, Swargarohini, Kedarnath, Kharcha Kund, Satopanth, Chaukhamba, Ghoriparvat, Haathi Parvat, and Sumeru.

== Climate ==
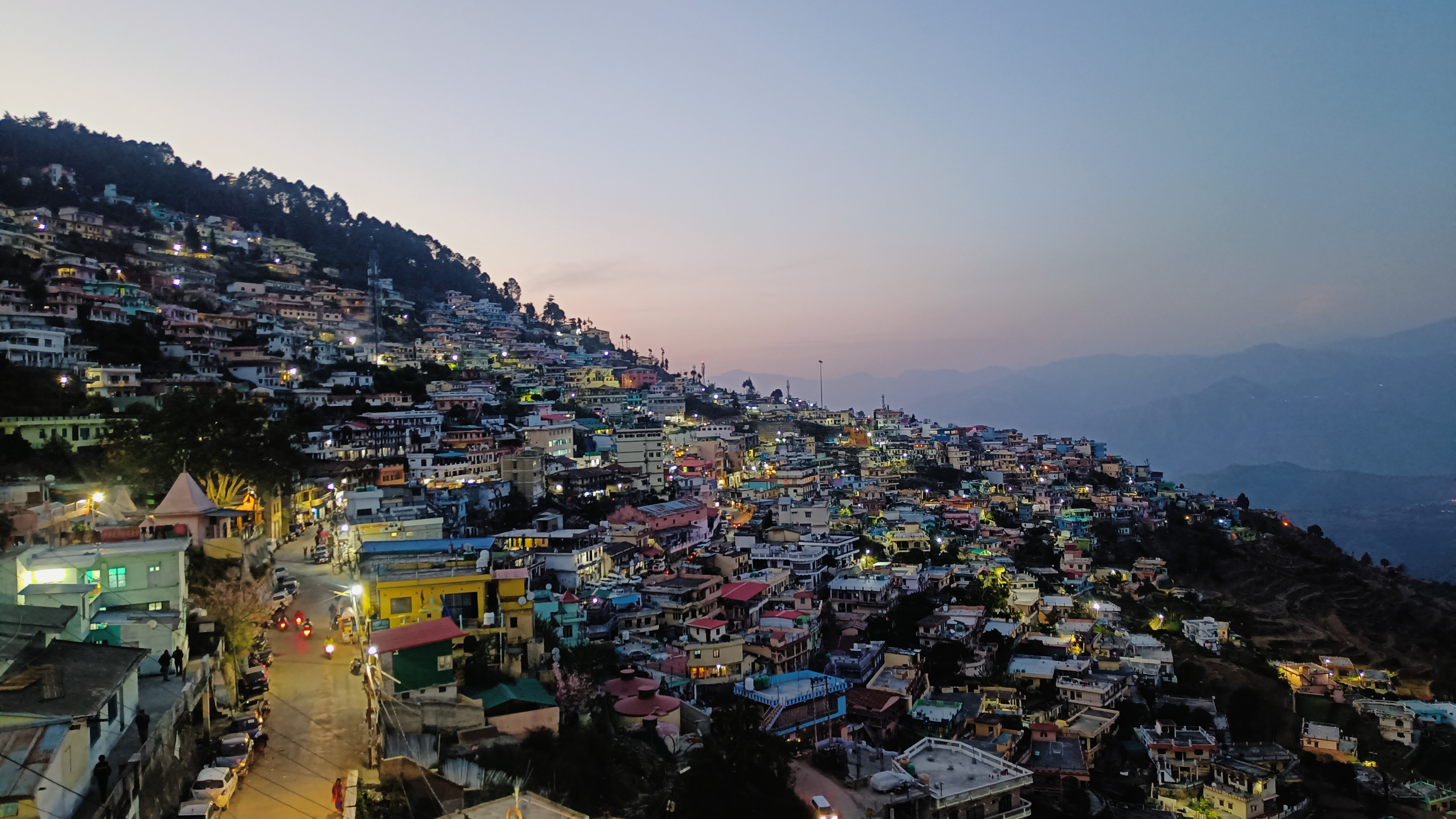
An evening view of Pauri town from the Garhwal Mandal Vikas Nigam (GMVN) guest house.

The region has a sub-temperate to temperate climate, which remains pleasant throughout the year. The climate of Pauri is very cold in winters and the region experiences low to moderate snowfall in the months of January or February.

== Demographics ==
As of 2001 India census, Pauri had a population of 24,742. Males constitute 53% of the population and females 47%. In Pauri, 12% of the population is under 6 years of age.

According to the Census India 2011, the Pauri Nagar Palika Parishad has a population of 25,440 of which 13,090 are males and 12,350 are females. The population of children ages 0-6 is 2766, which is 10.87% of the total population. The literacy rate of Pauri city is 92.18%, higher than state average of 78.82%. In Pauri, male literacy is around 95.74% while female literacy rate is 88.44%. Pauri Nagar Palika Parishad contains 6,127 houses.

The language most commonly used in Pauri Garhwal is Garhwali.

== Education ==
=== Govind Ballabh Pant Engineering College ===
Govind Ballabh Pant Engineering College (GBPEC), now known as Govind Ballabh Pant Institute of Engineering and Technology (GBPIET), is an autonomous State Government Higher Technical Institution. It was created in 1989 to honour the Indian Freedom Fighter, Bharat Ratna, Govind Ballabh Pant. The institute is located at a height of 1800m (approx 5905 ft.) above Sea Level and overlooks the Great Himalayan Range on its East flank. The college offers courses such as Bachelor of Technology, Master of Technology and Master of Computer Applications, Mechanical Engineering and Civil Engineering.

=== Hemwati Nandan Bahuguna Central University ===
Dr. B. G. R Campus, referred to as the Pauri campus of Hemwati Nandan Bahuguna Garhwal University is a full-fledged educational campus established in 1971. Pauri College is one of the three campuses of Hemwati Nandan Bahuguna Garhwal University, located in Srinagar, Garhwal. The campus offers arts, science and law courses at graduation, post graduation and research fellowships levels.

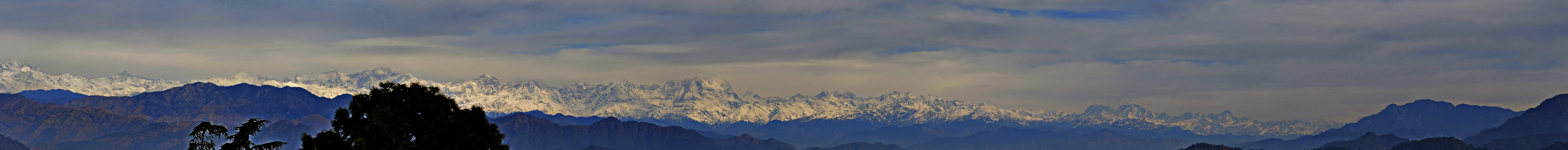
Himalaya Panorama from Pauri.

== Media and communications ==
All India Radio has a local station in Pauri which transmits various programs of mass interest.

== Notable people ==
- General Bipin Rawat (1958–2021), India's 1st Chief of Defense Staff, last Chairman of the Chiefs of Staff Committee, 26th Chief of the Army Staff and 37th Vice Chief of the Army Staff
- Lieutenant General Laxman Singh Rawat – Former Deputy Chief of the Army Staff and father of General Bipin Rawat
- General Anil Chauhan, India's 2nd Chief of Defense Staff and former General Officer Commanding-in-Chief Eastern Command of the Indian Army

== See also ==
- Poudel, a Bahun surname which originates from the town
