= Nainital Lok Sabha constituency =

Lok Sabha constituency in Uttarakhand

Coordinates: 29.4°N 79.5°E

Nainital
- Former Lok Sabha constituency

Constituency details
- Country: India
- Region: North India
- State: Uttarakhand
- Established: 1952
- Abolished: 2009

Nainital was a Lok Sabha constituency in Uttarakhand, India. This constituency came into existence in 1952 and existed until 2009, following the delimitation of Lok Sabha constituencies.

== Assembly segments ==
Before the formation of Uttarakhand

Nainital Lok Sabha constituency comprised the following five Vidhan Sabha (legislative assembly) constituency segments of Uttar Pradesh:

District	Assembly constituency segments	
District	Name	SC/ST
Bareilly	Baheri	
Nainital
Nainital	Haldwani	
Nainital	Nainital	
Udham Singh Nagar
Udham Singh Nagar	Kashipur	
Udham Singh Nagar	Khatima	SC

After the formation of Uttarakhand

Nainital Lok Sabha constituency comprised the following twelve Vidhan Sabha (legislative assembly) constituency segments of Uttarakhand:

District	Assembly constituency segments		
District	Number	Name	SC/ST
Nainital
Nainital	53	Dhari	
Nainital	54	Haldwani	
Nainital	52	Mukteshwar	SC
Nainital	55	Nainital	
Nainital	56	Ramnagar	
Udham Singh Nagar
Udham Singh Nagar	59	Bajpur	
Udham Singh Nagar	57	Jaspur	
Udham Singh Nagar	58	Kashipur	
Udham Singh Nagar	63	Khatima	ST
Udham Singh Nagar	60	Pantnagar–Gadarpur	
Udham Singh Nagar	61	Rudrapur–Kichha	
Udham Singh Nagar	62	Sitarganj	SC

== Members of Parliament ==
Keys:

AIIC(T)
BJP
INC/INC(I)/INC(R)
JD
JP

Election	Member	Party
1951–52	Chandra Dutt Pande	Indian National Congress
1957	Chandra Dutt Pande	Indian National Congress
1962	Krishna Chandra Pant	Indian National Congress
1967	Krishna Chandra Pant	Indian National Congress
1971	Krishna Chandra Pant	Indian National Congress (R)
1977	Bharat Bhushan	Janata Party
1980	Narayan Datt Tiwari	Indian National Congress (I)
1984	Satyendra Chandra Guria	Indian National Congress (I)
1989	Mahendra Singh Pal	Janata Dal
1991	Balraj Pasi	Bharatiya Janata Party
1996	Narayan Datt Tiwari	All India Indira Congress (Tiwari)
1998	Ila Pant	Bharatiya Janata Party
1999	Narayan Datt Tiwari	Indian National Congress
2002 (By-election)	Mahendra Singh Pal	Indian National Congress
2004	Karan Chand Singh Baba	Indian National Congress

== See also ==
- Nainital–Udhamsingh Nagar (Lok Sabha constituency)
- List of former constituencies of the Lok Sabha
