= N. D. Tiwari =

Indian politician (1925–2018)

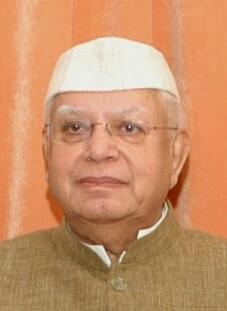

19th Governor of Andhra Pradesh
- In office 22 August 2007 – 27 December 2009
- Preceded by: Rameshwar Thakur
- Succeeded by: E. S. L. Narasimhan

3rd Chief Minister of Uttaranchal
- In office 2 March 2002 – 7 March 2007
- Preceded by: Bhagat Singh Koshyari
- Succeeded by: B. C. Khanduri

18th Minister of Finance
- In office 25 July 1987 – 25 June 1988
- Prime Minister: Rajiv Gandhi
- Preceded by: Rajiv Gandhi
- Succeeded by: Shankarrao Chavan

15th Minister of External Affairs
- In office 22 October 1986 – 25 July 1987
- Prime Minister: Rajiv Gandhi
- Preceded by: P. Shiv Shankar
- Succeeded by: Rajiv Gandhi

9th Chief Minister of Uttar Pradesh
- In office 25 June 1988 – 5 December 1989
- Preceded by: Vir Bahadur Singh
- Succeeded by: Mulayam Singh Yadav
- In office 3 August 1984 – 24 September 1985
- Preceded by: Sripati Mishra
- Succeeded by: Vir Bahadur Singh
- In office 21 January 1976 – 30 April 1977
- Preceded by: Hemwati Nandan Bahuguna
- Succeeded by: Ram Naresh Singh

Personal details
- Born: Narayan Datt Tiwari; 18 October 1925 Baluti, United Provinces, British India
- Died: 18 October 2018 (aged 93) New Delhi, India
- Party: Bhartiya Janata Party (2017-2018)
- Other political affiliations: Indian National Congress (1963-1996 and 1998-2017) Praja Socialist Party (till 1963); All India Indira Congress (Tiwari) (1996–1998)
- Spouses: Sushila Tiwari (m. 1953; died 1991) Ujjwala Tiwari (m. 2013)
- Children: 1
- Education: Allahabad University (M. A. in Political Science, LLB)

Narayan Datt Tiwari (18 October 1925 – 18 October 2018) was an Indian politician who served as the 9th Chief Minister of Uttar Pradesh and 3rd Chief Minister of Uttaranchal (later Uttarakhand) from 2002 to 2007. He was the first Indian Chief Minister who served for two states. He was a member of the Bharatiya Janata Party, a former member of the Praja Socialist Party and the Indian National Congress. He joined the Bhartiya Janata Party in 2017.

He was a three-time Chief Minister of Uttar Pradesh (1976–77, 1984–85, 1988–89) and to date remains the last Congress CM of Uttar Pradesh. He also served once as Chief Minister of Uttarakhand (2002–2007). Between 1986 and 1988, he served in Prime Minister Rajiv Gandhi's cabinet, first as Minister for External Affairs and then as Minister of Finance. He served as Governor of Andhra Pradesh from 2007 until 2009, when he resigned due to health and personal reasons.

== Early life and education ==
Narayan Datt Tiwari was born to a Kumaoni Brahmin family in 1925, in the village of Baluti located in Nainital district of Uttarakhand state. His father Poornanand Tiwari was an officer in the forest department, and who later resigned and joined the Non-cooperation movement. Tiwari received his education at various schools including, M.B. School, Haldwani, E.M. High School, Bareilly and C.R.S.T. High School, Nainital.

His initiation into politics came early, when during the Indian Independence movement, he was arrested on 14 December 1942 for writing Anti-British leaflets opposing imperialist policies, and sent to Nainital jail, where his father was already lodged. Upon his release after 15 months in 1944, he enrolled at Allahabad University, where he topped the university in M.A. (Political Science); he continued his education with an LLB from the same university, and was elected as the President of the Students' Union of the Allahabad University in 1947. Meanwhile, he remained Secretary of the All India Student Congress from 1947 to 1949.

== Career ==
=== Early career ===
In the first election in Uttar Pradesh after the independence for the Uttar Pradesh Legislative Assembly held in 1952, he was elected from Nanital constituency and became an MLA for the first time on Praja Socialist Party ticket. In 1957, he was elected from the Nainital legislative constituency, and became the leader of Opposition in the Assembly.

In 1963, he joined the Indian National Congress, and was elected Member of the Legislative Assembly (MLA) from the Kashipur constituency in 1965 and was subsequently appointed a minister in the Government of Uttar Pradesh. After that he also remained Minister for Finance and Parliamentary Affairs in the Chaudhary Charan Singh Government (1979–1980). In 1968, he established Jawaharlal Nehru National Youth Centre (JNNYC), a voluntary organisation. He remained the first President of Indian Youth Congress from 1969 to 1971.

=== Later positions ===
Tiwari was the chief minister of Uttar Pradesh thrice: from January 1976 to April 1977, from August 1984 to September 1985 and from June 1988 to December 1988. He was elected to the 7th Lok Sabha in 1980, and served as a union minister in several portfolios in the 1980s: starting with Planning, and also remained Deputy Chairman of Planning Commission. Thereafter he became a member of Rajya Sabha 1985–1988, during this period he also remained the Minister of Industries in September 1985 and in addition to that portfolio, became minister of Petroleum in 1986. He then served as India's External Affairs Minister from October 1986 until July 1987, at which point he became Minister of Finance and Commerce. He served in that position until June 1988, when he became chief minister of Uttar Pradesh for the third time.

He was an unsuccessful contender to be Prime Minister of India in the early 1990s but was pipped to the post by P. V. Narasimha Rao. In 1994, he resigned from Congress and formed his own All India Indira Congress (Tiwari) along with senior Congress leader, Arjun Singh in 1995. He joined back when Sonia Gandhi came at the helm of affairs of the party two years later, and after a devastating defeat of the party under Narasimha Rao during the general elections in 1996. Tiwari was elected to the 11th Lok Sabha in 1996, and again to the 13th Lok Sabha in 1999.

He later served as the Chief Minister of Uttarakhand, which was carved out of Uttar Pradesh, from 2002 through 2007. He resigned on 5 March 2006, citing his age and left office in March 2007 following setbacks from his party in the state elections.

Narayan Datt Tiwari was appointed as the Governor of Andhra Pradesh on 19 August 2007 and was sworn in on 22 August 2007. Following a controversy over his involvement in a sex scandal, he resigned as the governor on 27 December 2009, citing "health grounds"; subsequently he relocated to Dehradun, Uttarakhand.

=== Support to the BJP ===
A lifelong Congressman, Tiwari along with his son Rohit Shekhar (advocate and former advisor, Government of Uttar Pradesh) and his wife Ujjwala, joined the BJP and gave his support to Narendra Modi and the BJP for the assembly elections held in the states of Uttarakhand and Uttar Pradesh in presence of BJP President Amit Shah in the name of development.

== Personal life ==
In 1953, he married Sushila (née Sanwal), who died in 1991.

On 14 May 2013, he married Ujjwala Tiwari (née Singh), his longtime girlfriend and mother of his biological son Rohit Shekhar, at the age of 88.

Tiwari died on his 93rd birthday on 18 October 2018 in New Delhi from multiple organ failure. He was hospitalised for a long time.

His son Rohit Shekhar died at the age of 40 after being strangled by his wife in April 2019.

== Controversies ==
=== Sex scandal ===
Tiwari was involved in a sex scandal which depicted Tiwari in bed with three women at his official residence in the Raj Bhavan. A police complaint was filed against Tiwari for "sexually abusing girls, blackmail and misuse of office" and the Raj Bhavan staff were interrogated by police about details related to the scandal, alleged to be the result of the fallout of a mining deal. Tiwari publicly apologised, but claimed that he was being "framed" by "a political conspiracy". On 27 December 2009, E. S. L. Narasimhan was appointed to discharge the duties of governor for the region until regular arrangements for the office were made.

=== Paternity suit ===
In 2008, Rohit Shekhar filed a paternity suit claiming that Tiwari was his biological father. After long legal processes, the court ordered that DNA mapping of Tiwari be done. After further legal filibustering from his side, the court finally compelled compliance on 29 May 2011. On 27 July 2011, the Delhi High Court, citing a need to end the controversy, rejected a request from Tiwari's lawyers to keep his paternity test result a secret.

The DNA test results, released by the court on 27 July 2011, established that Tiwari was indeed the biological father of Rohit Shekhar Tiwari, and also that Ujjwala Singh Sharma was his biological mother. Tiwari urged the media to respect his privacy, saying "I have every right to live my life my way. No one has the right to look into my private life. Please respect my privacy." On 3 March 2013, he said "I have accepted that Rohit Shekhar is my son. The DNA test also proved he is my biological son," he told NDTV.

=== Second marriage ===
On 14 May 2013, ten months after a positive paternity test, Tiwari married Rohit Shekhar's mother, Ujjwala Singh Sharma, in a ceremony in Lucknow which had some religious elements, but was mainly a registered marriage.

Born in 1953 into a family belonging to Haryana, Ujjwala was thirty years younger than Tiwari. Her father, Prof. Sher Singh, a prominent politician, served as India's Union Minister for Education and for Defense Production from 1967 to 1980, serving successively under Indira Gandhi and Morarji Desai. Ujjwala's mother, Prabhat Shobha Pandit, was a homemaker. The family lived in a large government bungalow (No.3, Krishna Menon Marg), where N.D. Tiwari was a frequent visitor. In 1970, at the age of 17, Ujjwala was married to Bipin Sharma and they became the parents of a son, Siddharth Sharma. According to reports, Ujjwala and her husband separated shortly after Siddharth's birth, but they did not obtain a divorce until 2006. Ujjwala and Tiwari had met for the first time in 1968, before her wedding, but their affair took off around 1977, and Rohit Shekhar was born in the late 1970s. Tiwari's marriage had remained childless and his wife, Sushila Tiwari, died of cancer in 1991 after over 40 years of marriage. After her death, Ujjwala reportedly tried to claim her place, but was rebuffed by Tiwari; an incident happened in 1995 when Ujjwala and Rohit tried to enter Tiwari's official residence to meet him, but were stopped and pushed back by his security guards, after which they sat in protest outside his house, to no avail. Tiwari had totally distanced himself from Ujjwala by this time; the scandal of marrying the divorced mother of two would ruin his career, which was at its zenith in the period 1991–96, under P.V. Narasimha Rao. Tiwari had had little or no contact with either Ujjwala or Rohit for more than a decade before Rohit Shekhar began his campaign to establish his paternity. He began this campaign in 2007–08, very shortly after the divorce of Ujjwala and Bipin Sharma in 2006. It culminated in the wedding of 88-year-old widower Tiwari and 60-year-old divorcee Ujjwala in May 2013.

On 12 May 2018, in the presence of N.D. Tiwari and Ujjwala Tiwari, their son Rohit Shekhar Tiwari was married to Apoorva Shukla, a lawyer. Rohit and Apoorva had met through a matrimonial website, and had lived together for a few months before getting married. Nevertheless, the marriage proved stormy from the beginning. On 16 April 2019, only 11 months after the wedding, and six months after the death of N.D. Tiwari, Rohit Shekhar was found strangled to death in his bed. He had allegedly been smothered to death by his wife Apoorva, at a time when he was drunk and unable to resist the attack. According to Delhi Police Statement, the murder was not pre-planned but happened in the heat of the moment. According to his wife's testimony, their relationship was sour from the beginning of their marriage. According to the testimony of Ujjwala and others, Apoorva had married Rohit with an eye on his family property and with the idea that he would become a powerful politician under his father's tutelage. She had found that her dreams were far from reality and she found that Rohit Shekhar has affair and a child with his distant relative’s wife. The trial is ongoing in court, and meanwhile, Apoorva is in jail, having been denied bail several times.

Lok Sabha
Preceded by Bharat Bhushan	Member of Parliament for Nainital; 1980 – 1984	Succeeded by Satyendra Chandra Guria
Preceded by Balraj Pasi	Member of Parliament for Nainital; 1996 – 1998	Succeeded by Ila Pant
Preceded by Ila Pant	Member of Parliament for Nainital; 1999 – 2002	Succeeded by Mahendra Singh Pal
Rajya Sabha
Preceded by N/A	Member of Parliament for Uttar Pradesh; 2 December 1985 – 23 October 1988	Succeeded by Syed Sibtey Razi
Political offices
Preceded by President's Rule	Chief Minister of Uttar Pradesh; 21 January 1976 – 30 April 1977	Succeeded by President's Rule
Preceded by D. T. Lakdawala	Deputy Chairman; Planning Commission (India); 9 June 1980 – 8 August 1981	Succeeded by Shankarrao Chavan
Preceded by Sripati Mishra	Chief Minister of Uttar Pradesh; 3 August 1984 – 24 September 1985	Succeeded by Vir Bahadur Singh
Preceded by Veerendra Patil	Union Minister of Industry; 25 September 1985 – 22 October 1986	Succeeded by Jalagam Vengala Rao
Preceded by P. Shiv Shankar	Union Minister of External Affairs; 22 October 1986 – 25 July 1987	Succeeded by Rajiv Gandhi
Preceded by Rajiv Gandhi	Union Minister of Finance; 25 July 1987 – 25 June 1988	Succeeded by Shankarrao Chavan
Preceded by P. Shiv Shankar	Union Minister of Commerce; 25 July 1987 – 25 June 1988	Succeeded by Dinesh Singh
Preceded by Vir Bahadur Singh	Chief Minister of Uttar Pradesh; 25 June 1988 – 5 December 1989	Succeeded by Mulayam Singh Yadav
Preceded by Bhagat Singh Koshyari	Chief Minister of Uttaranchal; 2 March 2002 – 7 March 2007	Succeeded by B. C. Khanduri
Government offices
Preceded by Rameshwar Thakur	Governor of Andhra Pradesh; 22 August 2007 – 27 December 2009	Succeeded by E.S.L. Narasimhan
