= Vir Bahadur Singh =

Indian politician (1935–1989)

Veer Bahadur Singh

Minister of Communications
- In office 25 June 1988 – 30 May 1989
- Prime Minister: Rajiv Gandhi
- Preceded by: Vasant Sathe
- Succeeded by: Giridhar Gamang

14th Chief Minister of Uttar Pradesh
- In office 24 September 1985 – 24 June 1988
- Preceded by: N. D. Tiwari
- Succeeded by: N. D. Tiwari

Personal details
- Born: 18 February 1935 Gorakhpur, United Provinces, British India
- Died: 30 May 1989 (aged 54) Paris, France
- Party: Indian National Congress

Veer Bahadur Singh (18 February 1935 – 30 May 1989) was an Indian politician belonging to the Indian National Congress. He was Chief Minister of Uttar Pradesh from 1985 to 1988 and Minister of Communications in Central government from 1988 to 1989. He was also an author.

== Personal life ==
=== Childhood and early life ===
Veer Bahadur Singh was born in Gorakhpur. He was born in a Rajput family.

=== Family ===
His son, Fateh Bahadur Singh who studied in Colonel Brown Cambridge School, Dehradun has been the minister several times in Uttar Pradesh cabinet (Forest Minister of U.P.).

== Political career ==
Vir Bahadur Singh remained Chief Minister of Uttar Pradesh from 24 September 1985 till 25 June 1988.

He was appointed Union Minister of Communication in 1988, by Rajiv Gandhi.

Late Om Prakash Pandey and Mr. Brij Bhushan Singh were his close aides. Vir Bahadur Singh has delegated his political activities in Eastern Uttar Pradesh to them. They were very active budding leaders in the belt of Allahabad University, Banaras Hindu University and Purvanchal University. The political activities at the grass root i.e. "student leadership at university level" touched its zenith under the leadership of Om Prakash Pandey. The root cause of their political success was Om Prakash's populist measures towards people atrocities and swift decision making. The sudden death of Om Prakash Pandey due to unknown reason in early 1988 broke the reign of burgeoning student political water in the region. All student associations dispersed after his death as Mr. Brij Bhushan Singh who was too young to accept the responsibility therefore withdrew from political career.

The same proved the major setback for Vir Bahadur Singh and his political career hence losing majority in state assembly in June 1988.

== Offices ==
=== Chief Minister of Uttar Pradesh ===
Singh was appointed the 13th Chief Minister of Uttar Pradesh on 24 September 1985 and remained for a period of 2 years and 274 days, till 2 August 1988. At that time he was Member of Uttar Pradesh Legislative Assembly from Paniyara. He succeeded N. D. Tiwari who was also Chief Minister before him. He was the first Chief Minister of Uttar Pradesh from Gorakhpur. He lost the Chief Ministership in a party reshuffle when he resigned as CM to join the Union Cabinet as Minister for Communications.

=== Minister of Communications ===
After resignation from the position of Chief Minister of Uttar Pradesh, he was assigned the position of Minister of Communications of India on the 25 June 1988 and remained till 30 May 1989, under the Rajiv Gandhi ministry.

== Death ==
Veer Bahadur Singh died on 30 May 1989 in Paris, France at the age of 54 during his visit.

== Books ==
- From Naoroji to Nehru: Six essays in Indian economic thought
  - ISBN: ISBN 978-0-333-90052-9
  - Country : India
  - Language : English
  - Edition : Unknown (174 pages)
  - Publisher : Macmillan Company of India (1975)
- Essays in Indian political economy, by V. B. Singh
  - ASIN : ASIN B0017YGGLA
  - Country : India
  - Language : English
  - Edition : Unknown (302 pages)
  - Publisher : (1967)
- An evaluation of fair price shops
  - ASIN : ASIN B0017YK7FG
  - Country : India
  - Language : English
  - Edition : Unknown
  - Publisher : (1973)
- Indian economy yesterday and today.
  - ASIN : ASIN B0017YK7LA
  - Country : India
  - Language : English
  - Edition : Unknown
  - Publisher : (1970)
- An introduction to the study of Indian labour problems
  - ASIN : ASIN B0017YGGOW
  - Country : India
  - Language : English
  - Edition : Unknown
  - Publisher : (1967)
- Labour research in India
  - ASIN : ASIN B0014MJYPA
  - Country : India
  - Language : English
  - Edition : Unknown
  - Publisher : (1970)
- Multinational corporations and India
  - ASIN : ASIN B0000D5PLP
  - Country : India
  - Language : English
  - Edition : Unknown (161 pages)
  - Publisher : Sterling (1979)
- Patterns of economic development. A study of the economic development of the UK, the US, Japan, the USSR, and China.
  - ASIN : ASIN B0017YLW96
  - Country : India
  - Language : English
  - Edition : Unknown
  - Publisher : (1970)
- Studies in African economic development
  - ASIN : ASIN B0017YGGUQ
  - Country : India
  - Language : English
  - Edition : Unknown
  - Publisher : (1972)
- Role of labour in economic development
  - ASIN : ASIN B0014MLLB0
  - Country : India
  - Language : English
  - Edition : Unknown
  - Publisher : (1970)
- Social and economic change. Essays in honour of Prof. D. P. Mukerji
  - ASIN : ASIN B0017YGMGO
  - Country : India
  - Language : English
  - Edition : Unknown
  - Publisher : (1970)
- Theories of economic development
  - ASIN : ASIN B0017YK7TC
  - Country : India
  - Language : English
  - Edition : Unknown
  - Publisher : (1971)
- Wage patterns, mobility, and savings of workers in India: A study of Kanpur textile industry
  - ASIN : ASIN B0014MMY20
  - Country : India
  - Language : English
  - Edition : Unknown
  - Publisher : (1973)

== Bibliography ==
1. Bose, Sumantra (2018). Secular States, Religious Politics. Cambridge University. pp. 135–136. ISBN 978-1108454865.
2. Singh, Ujjwal Kumar (2007). The State, Democracy and Anti-terror law in India. New Delhi, India: The Sage Publication. pp. 435–438. ISBN 978-81-7829-955-6.

Political offices
Preceded by Narayan Dutt Tiwari	Chief Minister of Uttar Pradesh; 24 Sep 1985 – 25 Jun 1988	Succeeded by Narayan Dutt Tiwari
