= Harbhajan Singh Cheema =

Indian politician

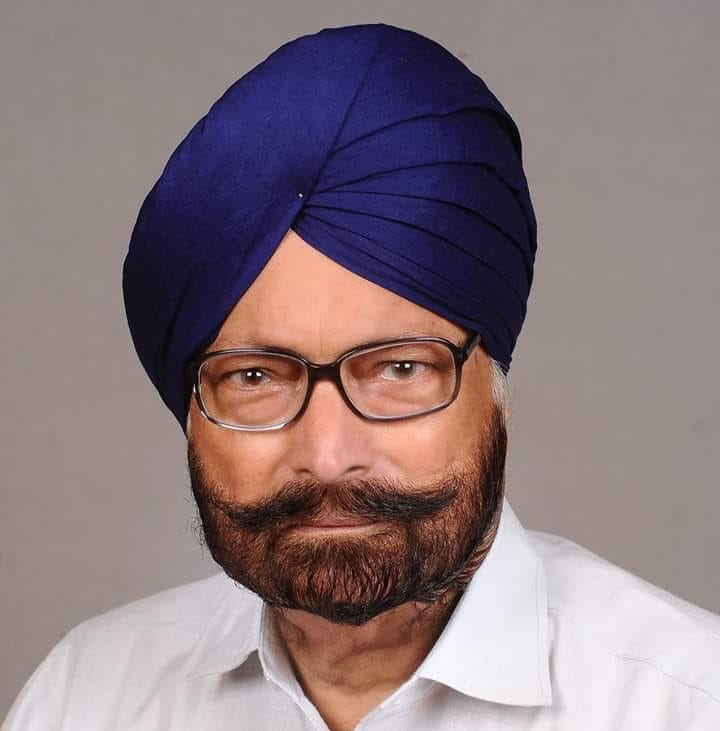
- Harbhajan Singh Cheema

Member of the Uttarakhand Legislative Assembly

Personal details
- Born: Kashipur, Uttarakhand, India
- Party: Bharatiya Janata Party

Harbhajan Singh Cheema is an Indian politician and member of the Bharatiya Janata Party. Cheema was a four term member of the Uttarakhand Legislative Assembly from the Kashipur constituency in Udham Singh Nagar district.

== Electoral performance ==
2017 Uttarakhand Legislative Assembly election: Kashipur
Party	Candidate	Votes	%	±%
BJP	Harbhajan Singh Cheema	50,156	47.76	▲9.05
INC	Manoj Joshi	30,042	28.61	▼7.20
BSP	Mohd Ashraf Siddiqui	15,426	14.69	▼1.43
Independent	Rajeev Kumar Agarwal	7,106	6.77	New
NOTA	None of the above	655	0.62	New
Margin of victory		20,114	19.15	▲16.25
Turnout		1,05,012	69.51	▲0.05
Registered electors		1,51,069		▲28.03
BJP hold		Swing	▲9.05	

2012 Uttarakhand Legislative Assembly election: Kashipur
Party	Candidate	Votes	%	±%
BJP	Harbhajan Singh Cheema	31,734	38.72	▲5.05
INC	Manoj Joshi	29,352	35.81	▲19.14
BSP	Haseen Khan	13,211	16.12	▼0.29
URM	Mohd. Yamin Siddiqui	3,667	4.47	New
SP	Abdul Aziz Qureshi	1,216	1.48	▼15.79
Independent	Ram Vilas	1,074	1.31	New
RLD	Mohd. Anas Ansari	439	0.54	New
Margin of victory		2,382	2.91	▼13.48
Turnout		81,965	69.46	▲0.25
Registered electors		1,17,999		
BJP hold		Swing	▲5.05	

2007 Uttarakhand Legislative Assembly election: Kashipur
Party	Candidate	Votes	%	±%
BJP	Harbhajan Singh Cheema	31,756	33.66	▲2.97
SP	Mohd. Zubair	16,295	17.27	▼0.86
INC	Satyendra Chandra Gudiya	15,722	16.67	▼13.70
BSP	Avatar Singh	15,474	16.40	▲2.14
Independent	Mukesh Mehrotra	11,520	12.21	New
Independent	Sanjeev Kumar	1,013	1.07	New
UKD	Rekha Chowdhary	619	0.66	New
Margin of victory		15,461	16.39	▲16.06
Turnout		94,334	69.21	▲14.45
Registered electors		1,36,302		
BJP hold		Swing	▲2.97	

2002 Uttaranchal Legislative Assembly election: Kashipur
Party	Candidate	Votes	%	±%
BJP	Harbhajan Singh Cheema	18,396	30.69	
INC	K. C. Singh Baba	18,201	30.37	
SP	Avtar Singh	10,868	18.13	
BSP	Harish Negi	8,549	14.26	
LJP	Musharraf Husain	1,189	1.98	
Independent	Suresh Kumar	517	0.86	
Independent	Prem Kumar	361	0.60	
SJP(R)	Amarjeet Singh	303	0.51	
Margin of victory		195	0.33	
Turnout		59,933	54.76	
Registered electors		1,09,454		
