= Govind Ballabh Pant Engineering College =

Coordinates: 30.1838151°N 78.6929065°E

Govind Ballabh Pant Institute of Engineering and Technology
- Type: Government Autonomous College
- Established: 1989
- Affiliations: AICTE, Uttarakhand Technical University, DEHRADUN
- Director: Prof. Vijay Kumar Banga
- Undergraduates: 1391
- Postgraduates: 175
- Doctoral students: 76
- Location: Ghurdauri, Pauri Garhwal, Uttarakhand, India
- Campus: Rural
- Nickname: GBPIET Formerly GBPEC
- Website: {https://gbpiet.ac.in/}

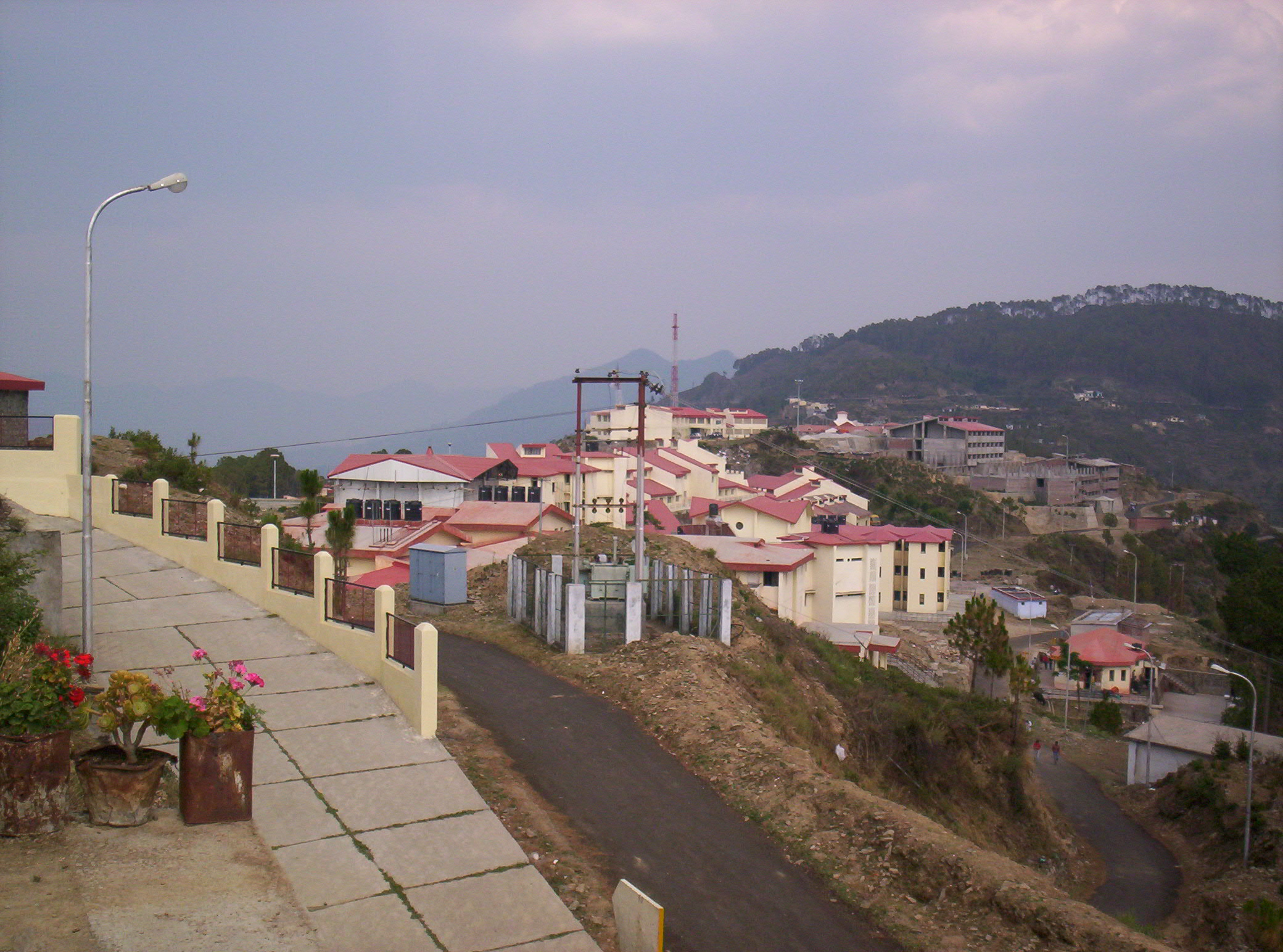
Overlooking the Himalayas from near the Principal's residence

Govind Ballabh Pant Institute of Engineering and Technology (GBPIET) (known as Govind Ballabh Pant Engineering College before August 2017) is an autonomous institution for higher technical education located in Ghurdauri of Pauri Garhwal district, in the north Indian state of Uttarakhand. College run by the government of Uttarakhand, India. It was created in 1989 and named after the memory of the first Chief Minister of Uttar Pradesh, statesman and Bharat Ratna recipient Pandit Govind Ballabh Pant.

== History ==
Gobind Ballabh Pant Institute of Engineering and Technology was established by the Government of Uttar Pradesh in 1989. It started its first academic session in 1991. The institute is affiliated with Uttarakhand Technical University, Dehradun. since 2006.

It is located about 11 km from Pauri, the District headquarters, and is about 33 km from Dev Prayag, a historical and pilgrimage place. When the weather is clear a panoramic view of Himalayas as well as a short view of Srinagar can be seen from GBPIET. The college is financed by the Government of Uttarakhand and managed by the Board of Governors with the Minister of Technical Education, Government of Uttarakhand, as the chairman.

== Courses ==
The institute offers courses in MCA, M. Tech, and B. Tech. The college provides seven undergraduate, five postgraduate, and six doctoral courses.

== Departments ==
- Applied Sciences and Humanities
- Biotechnology
- Civil Engineering
- Computer Science and Applications
- Computer Science and Engineering
- Electrical Engineering
- Electronics and Communication Engineering
- Mechanical Engineering

The college offers undergraduate B. Tech. degrees in:

- Biotechnology Engineering (60 seats)
- Civil Engineering (60 seats)
- Computer Science and Engineering (60 seats)
- Electrical Engineering (60 seats)
- Artificial Intelligence& Machine Learning(60 seats)
- Electronics and Communication Engineering (60 seats)
- Mechanical Engineering (60 seats)
- Production Engineering (15 seats)

The college offers postgraduate programmes M.C.A. (Master of Computer Applications), M.Tech programmes in biotechnology, digital signal processing, computer science and engineering, and production engineering.

The institute offers doctorate degrees Ph.D. in Biotechnology, Electronics and Communication Engineering, Computer Science and Applications, Computer Science and Engineering, and Electrical Engineering and Production Engineering
