= Nath Pai =

Indian politician

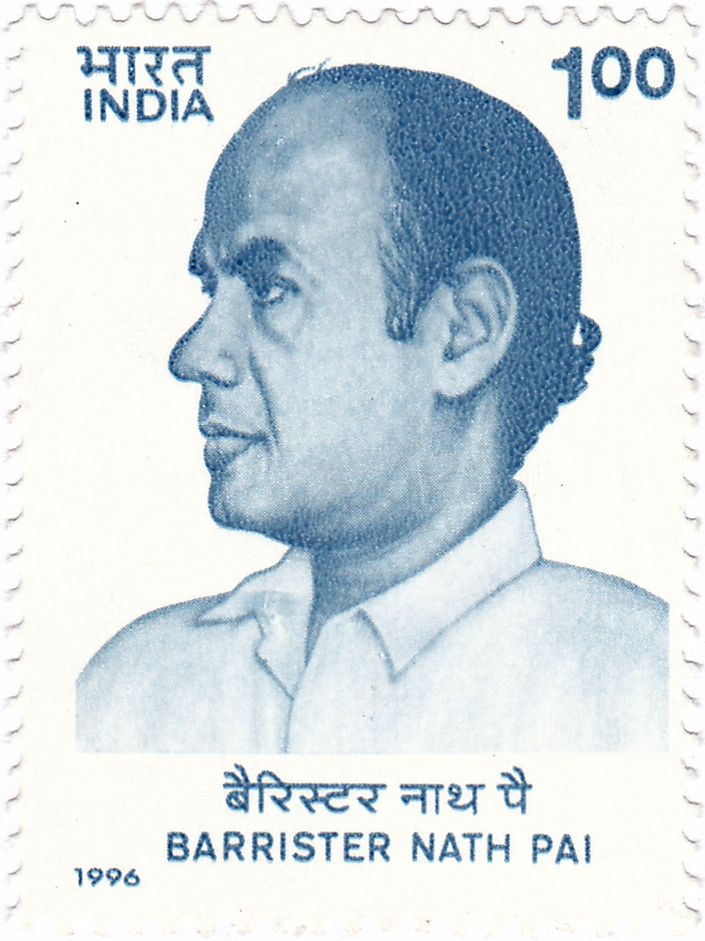

Member of Parliament, Lok Sabha
- In office 1957–1971
- Constituency: Rajapur

Personal details
- Born: Nath Bapu Pai; 25 September 1922 Vengurla, India
- Died: 18 January 1971 (aged 48)
- Party: Praja Socialist Party

Nath Bapu Pai (25 September 1922 – 18 January 1971) was an Indian freedom fighter, Barrister and Member of Parliament being a prominent leader of Praja Socialist Party.

== Life ==
He was married to Crystle, a fellow socialist from Austria, and he spoke French and German fluently. He was known for excellent oratory in Marathi and English. Of his debates in the Lok Sabha, veteran journalist D. B. Karnik, wrote “Once he had the floor to himself, he would not miss a single opportunity to put his opponents, particularly the ruling party, in the wrong box. Then quotations would flow, in English, Marathi and Sanskrit. There would be stories and anecdotes. There would be legal arguments and a flourish of emotional outbursts. Above all there would be the beauty of the language coming out with such superb power of expression”.

== Achievements ==
- He fought elections, unsuccessfully, for Mumbai State's assembly in 1952 from Belgaum region.
- He was elected Member of Parliament for 3 consecutive terms from Rajapur (Lok Sabha constituency) in 1957 Indian general election, 1962 Indian general election & 1967 Indian general election.
- He died in January 1971, just before that year's general election. His socialist friend Madhu Dandavate succeeded him as Lok Sabha member from the Rajapur seat.
- The Konkan Railway was his brainchild. Demands for an Indian West Coast railway line were continuously raised by Nath Pai as he actively voiced the concerns of the region.
- In 1954, Barrister Nath Pai was elected the first non-European president of International Union of Socialist Youth, headquartered at Austria.

== See also ==
- Praja Socialist Party
- Rajapur (Lok Sabha constituency)
