= Satyendra Chandra Guria =

Indian politician and journalist, MP for Nainital (1984–1989)

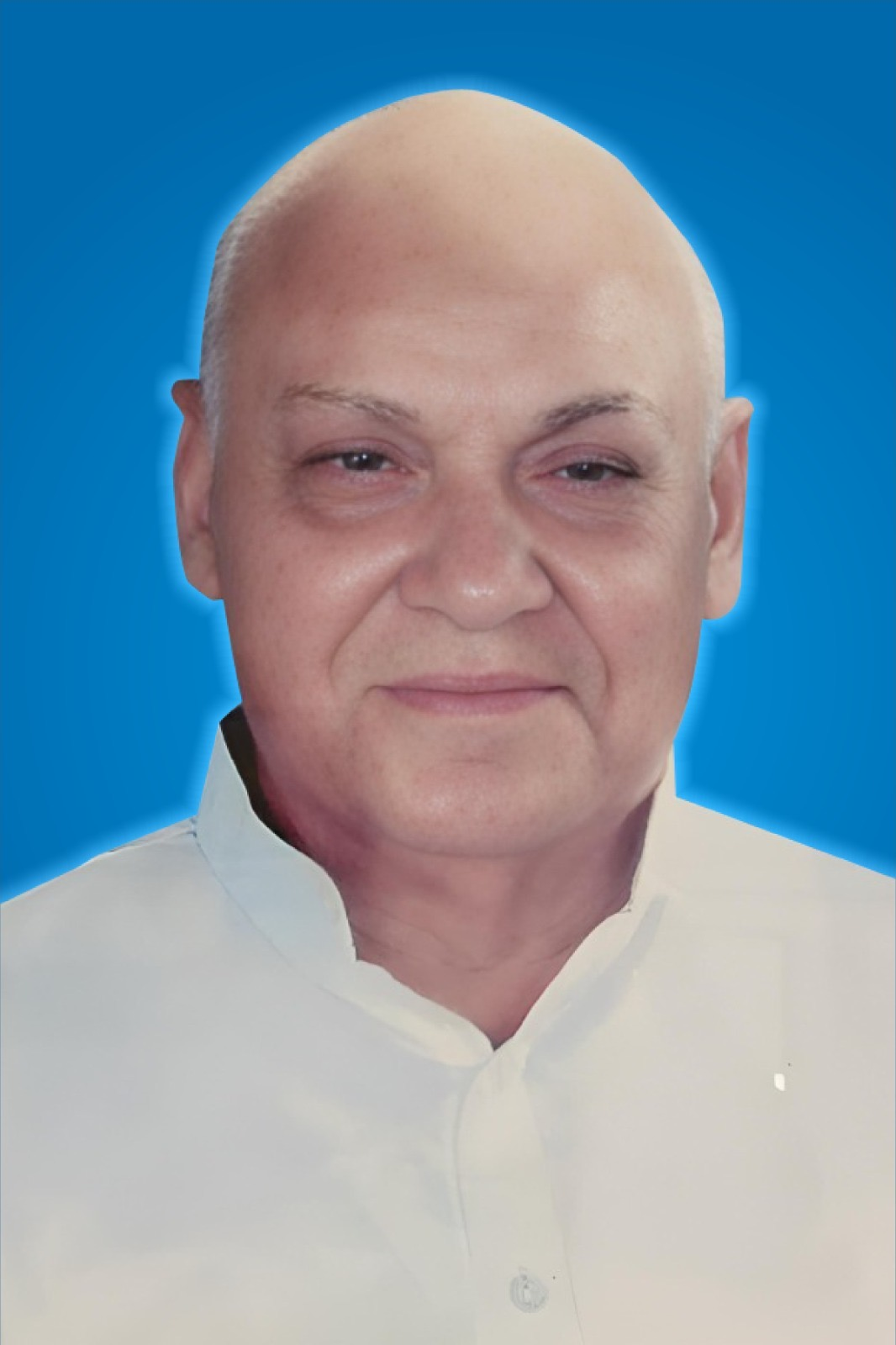

Member of Parliament, Lok Sabha
- In office 1984–1989
- Constituency: Nainital

Member of the Uttar Pradesh Legislative Assembly
- In office 1980–1984
- Constituency: Kashipur

Personal details
- Born: 13 December 1933 Kashipur, United Provinces, British India
- Died: 24 April 2010 (aged 76) AIIMS, New Delhi, India
- Party: Indian National Congress

Satyendra Chandra Guria (also referred to as S.C. Guria; 13 December 1933 – 24 April 2010) was an Indian politician, journalist, and administrator associated with the Indian National Congress. He served as a member of the Uttar Pradesh Legislative Assembly from 1980 to 1984 and later represented the Nainital constituency in the Eighth Lok Sabha from 1984 to 1989. Before entering politics, he had established himself as a journalist and editor, spending over three decades in Hindi-language journalism.

== Early life and education ==
Guria was born on 13 December 1933 in Kashipur, then part of the United Provinces of British India. He completed his schooling at Udayraj Hindu Inter College in Kashipur, an institution whose Managing Committee he would later serve as a member.

== Journalism career ==
Guria spent several decades in Hindi-language journalism before entering electoral politics. He edited the Hindi weekly newspaper Loktantra, based in Kashipur, for more than thirty years. He also served as President of the District Journalists Association, Kashipur, for four years, and was a member of the Shri Hindi Prem Sabha, Kashipur.

== Political career ==
=== Uttar Pradesh Legislative Assembly (1980–1984) ===
Guria entered electoral politics in 1980, winning a seat in the Uttar Pradesh Legislative Assembly from the Kashipur constituency. During this period, he served as Deputy Minister for Sugarcane, Irrigation, and Industry in the Uttar Pradesh government, under Chief Minister Narayan Dutt Tiwari.

=== Member of Parliament (1984–1989) ===
In the 1984 general election, Guria was elected to the Eighth Lok Sabha from the Nainital constituency on an Indian National Congress ticket. During his tenure as MP, he worked on development projects in his constituency. He was instrumental in establishing an Electronic Telephone Exchange in Kashipur, supported the opening of a regional office of Punjab National Bank, and facilitated welfare facilities for government employees across Kashipur, Jaspur, Bajpur, and Ramnagar. He also represented his constituency at national events, including the inauguration of the "Uttar Pradesh Mein Nehru" photographic exhibition in Kashipur during the Nehru Birth Centenary Year of 1989.

=== Later political career in Uttarakhand ===
After Uttarakhand was carved out as a separate state from Uttar Pradesh in 2000, Guria remained active in regional politics. He held a Cabinet-rank ministerial position in the Uttarakhand state government from 2004 to 2007.

== Administrative roles ==
Alongside his political career, Guria held several administrative positions. He served as Director of the Kumaon Vikas Nigam, Nainital, and as a member of the Administrative Board of Govind Ballabh Pant University of Agriculture and Technology, Pantnagar, the management board of Kumaon University, Nainital, and the Uttar Pradesh Hindi Sansthan.

== Death and legacy ==
Guria died on 24 April 2010 in New Delhi at the age of 77. His death was formally acknowledged in the Lok Sabha, where Speaker Meira Kumar read an obituary reference on the floor of the House on 28 April 2010, describing him as "a journalist by profession" and "a man of letters". The obituary was also published in the Journal of Parliamentary Information in September 2010.

Several educational institutions in Kashipur bear his name, including Satyendra Chandra Guria Law College and Satyendra Chandra Guria Institute of Management and Technology (SCG IMT). Annual events marking his birth and death anniversaries continue to be held in Kashipur.

== Sources ==
- Lok Sabha Secretariat (2010). Obituary Reference: Satyendra Chandra Guria, Member of the Eighth Lok Sabha (PDF) (Report). Parliament of India.
- Lok Sabha Secretariat (2010). "Lok Sabha Debates: Fifteenth Series, Vol. IX, Fourth Session, 2010 — No. 25, Wednesday, April 28, 2010" (PDF). Parliament of India.
- "Congress former MP Guria dead". The Tribune. 26 April 2010.
- Lok Sabha Secretariat (September 2010). "Obituary References" (PDF). Journal of Parliamentary Information.

Preceded by Narayan Dutt Tiwari	Member of Parliament for Nainital; 1984–1989	Succeeded by Mahendra Singh Pal
