= Sudhir Sawant =

Indian politician

Member of Parliament, Lok Sabha
- In office 20 June 1991 — 10 May 1996
- Preceded by: Madhu Dandavate
- Succeeded by: Suresh Prabhu
- Constituency: Rajapur, Maharashtra

Personal details
- Born: 9 February 1955 (age 71) Belgaum, Bombay State, India
- Party: Aam Aadmi Party
- Other political affiliations: Indian National Congress
- Spouse: Shubhangi
- Children: One son and one daughter

Brigadier Sudhir Sawant is an Indian politician. He is Honorary Brigadier (Retd.) from Territorial Army. He was actively involved in Party Politics till Late 2019, currently heading Sainik Federation and actively involved with grassroot level social activities for promotion of natural farming & implementation of concept of Abudant Village for overall growth in rural Maharashtra.

== Early life ==
Sudhir Sawant is the son of CS Sawant who was a three term MLA in Maharashtra Legislative Assembly as a Member of Peasants and Workers Party. Graduate from Defence Services Staff College, he served in the Indian army as Commando Instructor, 1982 to 84, served in J&K & Siachen & then Military Intelligence, 1988 to 91. He participated in Kargil War (Operation Parakram)

== Political career ==
Former Indian prime minister Rajiv Gandhi brought Sawant into electoral politics and gave him Loksabha ticket for Indian National Congress from the Rajapur Loksabha Constituency from the Konkan region of Maharashtra for the 1991 election. In the election Sawant defeated the long serving incumbent and former Union Railway Minister, Madhu Dandavate.

Indian National Congress President Sonia Gandhi appointed Sudhir Sawant as a national secretary of the party. Sawant joined Aam Aadmi Party Maharashtra unit on 12 January 2018 in presence of Arvind Kejriwal and on 6 June 2018 under presence of AAP National Secretary Pankaj Gupta he has been appointed as Aam Aadmi Party Maharashtra Unit Head Convenor. He resigned from the post of state convenor citing differences with Arvind Kejriwal.

== Career and Business interests outside politics ==
He is chairman of Forum for Strategic Studies, New Delhi and Tourism Co-Operative. He is the founder Of Sindhudurg sainik school Amboli located in Amboli, Sawantwadi of Sindhudurg district of maharashtra. This is the only one school in Maharashtra which is run by Ex-servicemen. He is also the president of sainik patpedhi (bank for ex servicemen of Sindhudurg). He also established Agriculture college in Oros, Sindhudurg.
