= Rajapur Lok Sabha constituency =

Former constituency of the Indian parliament in Maharashtra

Coordinates: 16.7°N 73.5°E

Rajapur
- Former Lok Sabha constituency

Constituency details
- Country: India
- Region: Western India
- State: Maharashtra
- Established: 1952
- Abolished: 2009
- Reservation: None

Rajapur was a Lok Sabha parliamentary constituency of Maharashtra. It was abolished in 2008 and merged with some other Vidhan Sabha constituency, to form a new Lok Sabha seat territorially, called Ratnagiri-Sindhudurg.

== Members of Parliament ==
Year	Member	Party
1952 : See Ratnagiri Lok Sabha constituency
1957	Nath Pai	Praja Socialist Party
1962	Nath Pai	Praja Socialist Party
1967	Nath Pai	Praja Socialist Party
1971	Madhu Dandavate	Praja Socialist Party
1977	Madhu Dandavate	Janata Party
1980	Madhu Dandavate	Janata Party
1984	Madhu Dandavate	Janata Party
1989	Madhu Dandavate	Janata Dal
1991	Sudhir Sawant	Indian National Congress
1996	Suresh Prabhu	Shiv Sena
1998	Suresh Prabhu	Shiv Sena
1999	Suresh Prabhu	Shiv Sena
2004	Suresh Prabhu	Shiv Sena
2008 onwards : See Ratnagiri–Sindhudurg Lok Sabha constituency

== Election results ==
=== 1991 Lok Sabha ===
- Sudhir Sawant (Congress) : 157,135
- Vamanrao Mahadik (Shiv Sena) : 114,089
- Madhu Dandavate (Janata Dal) : Came third.

=== 1996 Lok Sabha ===
- Suresh Prabhu (Shiv Sena) : 193,566
- Sudhir Sawant (Congress) : 127,430

=== 2004 ===
2004 Indian general elections: Rajapur
Party	Candidate	Votes	%	±%
SS	Suresh Prabhu	264,001	54.94	+3.87
INC	Sudhir Sawant	183,102	38.10	+14.23
BSP	Mohan Parab	12,616	2.62	
Independent	Mahendra Natekar	9,303	1.94	
Majority		80,899	16.84	
Turnout		480,610	57.51	−0.2
SS hold		Swing	+3.87	

== See also ==
- Rajapur
- Ratnagiri-Sindhudurg Lok Sabha constituency
