= Suresh Prabhu =

Indian politician (born 1953)

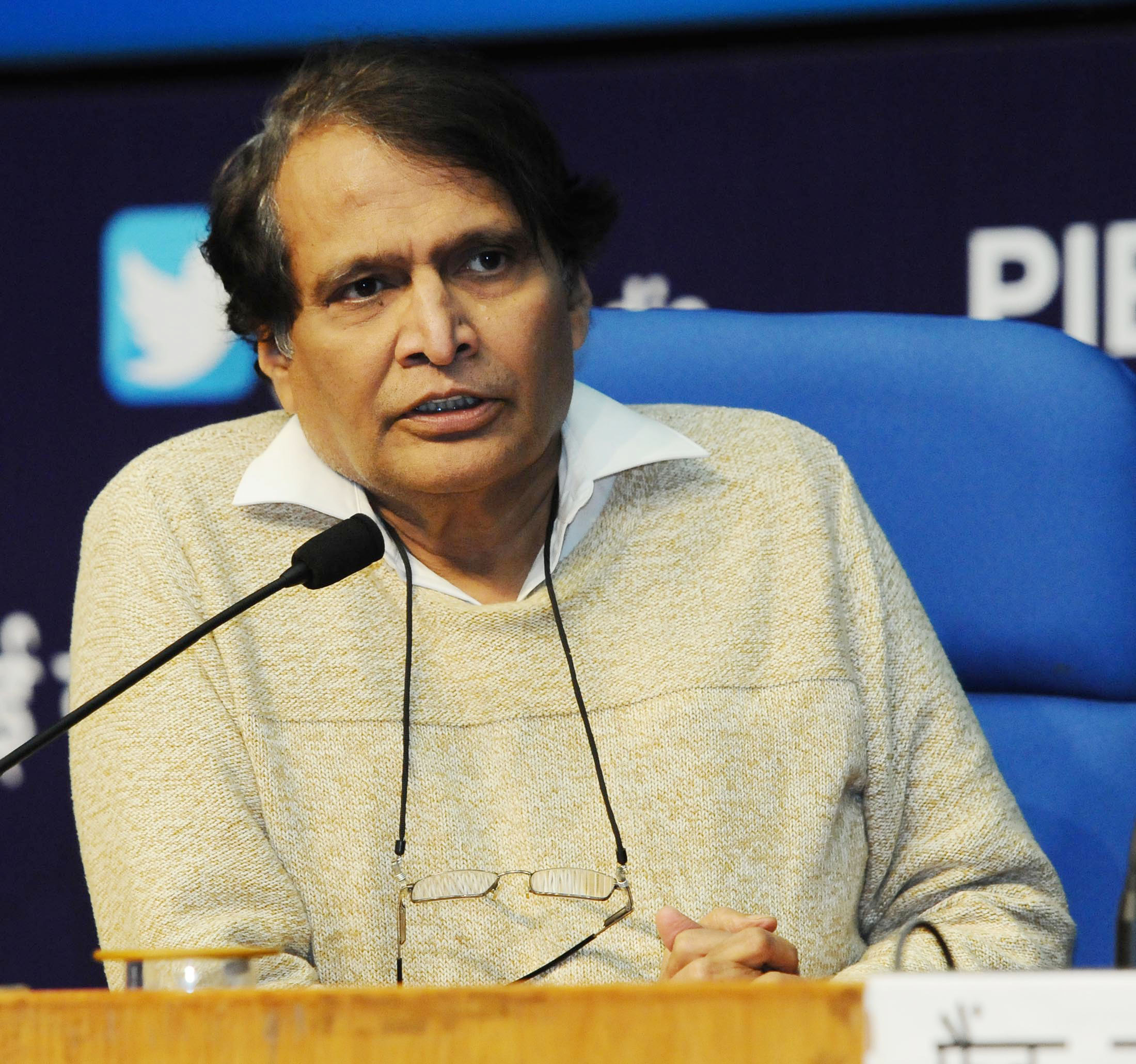
- Prabhu in January 2018

Indian emissary to the G20 & G7
- In office 24 June 2019 – 7 September 2021
- Prime Minister: Narendra Modi
- Preceded by: Shaktikanta Das
- Succeeded by: Piyush Goyal

Union Minister of Civil Aviation
- In office 12 March 2018 – 30 May 2019
- Prime Minister: Narendra Modi
- Preceded by: Ashok Gajapathi Raju
- Succeeded by: Hardeep Singh Puri (as MoS I/C)

Union Minister of Commerce and Industry
- In office 3 September 2017 – 30 May 2019
- Prime Minister: Narendra Modi
- Preceded by: Nirmala Sitharaman
- Succeeded by: Piyush Goyal

Union Minister of Railways
- In office 9 November 2014 – 3 September 2017
- Prime Minister: Narendra Modi
- Preceded by: D. V. Sadananda Gowda
- Succeeded by: Piyush Goyal

Union Minister of Power
- In office 30 September 2000 – 25 August 2002
- Prime Minister: Atal Bihari Vajpayee
- Preceded by: Rangarajan Kumaramangalam (BJP)
- Succeeded by: Anant Geete (SHS)

Union Minister of Chemicals & Fertilisers
- In office 13 October 1999 – 29 September 2000
- Prime Minister: Atal Bihari Vajpayee
- Preceded by: Office raised to Cabinet rank
- Succeeded by: Sunder Lal Patwa (BJP)

Union Minister of Environment and Forests
- In office 19 March 1998 – 13 October 1999
- Prime Minister: Atal Bihari Vajpayee
- Preceded by: Saifuddin Soz
- Succeeded by: T.R. Baalu (DMK)

Union Minister of Industry
- In office 16 May 1996 – 1 June 1996
- Prime Minister: Atal Bihari Vajpayee
- Preceded by: K. Karunakaran
- Succeeded by: Murasoli Maran

Member of Parliament, Lok Sabha
- In office 15 May 1996 – 18 May 2009
- Preceded by: Sudhir Sawant
- Succeeded by: Constituency abolished
- Constituency: Rajapur, Maharashtra

Member of Parliament, Rajya Sabha
- In office 22 June 2016 – 21 June 2022
- Preceded by: Nirmala Sitharaman
- Succeeded by: R. Krishnaiah
- Constituency: Andhra Pradesh
- In office 29 November 2014 – 21 June 2016
- Preceded by: Ranbir Singh Parjapati
- Succeeded by: Dr. Subhash Chandra
- Constituency: Haryana

Chairperson of the Task Force for Interlinking of Rivers
- In office 2002–2004
- Prime Minister: Atal Bihari Vajpayee

Personal details
- Born: Suresh Prabhakar Prabhu; 11 July 1953 (age 73) Bombay, Bombay State, India (present day Maharashtra)
- Party: Bharatiya Janata Party (since 2014)
- Other political affiliations: Shiv Sena (before 2014)
- Spouse: Uma Prabhu (m. 1984)
- Children: 1
- Education: University of Mumbai; Institute of Chartered Accountants of India
- Profession: Chartered Accountant; Chancellor, Rishihood University; Professor, London School of Economics
- Website: www.sureshprabhu.in

Suresh Prabhakar Prabhu (born 11 July 1953) is an Indian politician. He served as a Member of Parliament (MP) from 1996 to 2009, representing Rajapur in the Lok Sabha. He was also a member of the Rajya Sabha, representing Andhra Pradesh and Haryana from 2014 to 2022. Prabhu was PM Narendra Modi's Sherpa for the Group of 20 annual summit 2014-2015.

He held several ministerial portfolios in the cabinet of the Union Government, including the Minister of Civil Aviation, the Minister of Commerce and Industry, the Minister of Railways, the Minister of Fertilizers & Chemicals, and the Minister of Environment and Forests. He is the current chancellor of Rishihood University and chairman of the Indian Chamber of Food and Agriculture (ICFA).

Prabhu was appointed to the Bloomberg New Economy Advisory Board as the only representative from India. He has also worked in the Global Advisory Council of the World Economic Forum.

== Education and career ==
Suresh Prabhu is a chartered accountant by profession, becoming qualified in 1977. He attended Sharad Ashram Vidyamandir, Dadar, Mumbai, for schooling. He earned a Bachelor of Commerce degree with Honours from M. L. Dahanukar College, Vile Parle, Mumbai, and a Bachelor of Law degree from the New Law College (Ruparel College campus), Mumbai.

== Political career ==
Suresh Prabhu has been elected from Rajapur constituency, Maharashtra, from 1996 to 2004 under Shiv Sena.

Prabhu held ministerial positions during the Atal Bihari Vajpayee government (1998–2004) as Minister of Industry in 1996 and Minister of Heavy Industry and Public Enterprises in 2001-2004.

Prabhu also served as Minister of Environment and Forests from 9 March 1998 to 13 October 1999 under the Vajpayee government. During this period, initiatives he took included developing bamboo resources, drafting the Biological Diversity Act, preparing the National Environment Action Plan, and finalizing various waste management rules.

He held the Ministry of Chemicals and Fertilizers from 1999 to 2000. He worked on policies for the fertilizer, pharmaceutical, petrochemical, and chemical sectors.

He served as Minister of Power from 2000 to 2004. The Electricity Act of 2003 was enacted during his tenure. Reforms made under his ministry encouraged people to set up their businesses without being dependent on captive power generation.

Prabhu was appointed Chairperson of the Task Force for Interlinking of Rivers under the Vajpayee government.

In the first term of the Narendra Modi government, Suresh Prabhu was appointed Minister of Railways but resigned in 2017 following train accidents. In January 2016, the World Bank invited Prabhu to speak on the role of transport and cities in achieving climate goals.

He served as Minister of Commerce and Industry from 2017 to 2019. Prabhu also visited Russia to participate in "Timber in the Far East-Increasing Industry's Economic Return" and talked about India-Russia ties with Russian Minister Dmitry Kobylkin.

In the final period of the first term of the Narendra Modi government, he served as Minister of Civil Aviation. During this time, Prabhu helped construct seven airports across the country.

== Awards and recognition ==
On 18 August 2016, Prabhu received the Goud Saraswat Brahmin Samaj Maharatha Award. Media surveys between 2014 and 2017 ranked him among the top-performing ministers. He was appointed Visiting Professor in Practice by the Grantham Research Institute on Climate Change and the Environment. In 2024, he received the Lifetime Achievement Award from the Economic Policy Group (EPG).

== Social work and interests ==
- Founder and trustee of Manav Sadhan Vikas Sansthan, which is a non-profit organisation.
- Formed the CoOperative Development Forum (CDF) to promote the cooperative movement in the country.

Lok Sabha
Preceded by Sudhir Sawant	Member of Parliament for Rajapur; 1996–2009	Succeeded by Constituency merged into Ratnagiri–Sindhudurg constituency Nilesh Narayan Rane
Political offices
Preceded by P R Kumaramangalam	Minister of Power; 30 September 2000 – 24 August 2002	Succeeded by Anant Geete
Preceded by Manohar Joshi	Minister of Heavy Industries and Public Enterprises; 26 August 2002 – 24 May 2004	Succeeded by Santosh Mohan Dev
Preceded by D. V. Sadananda Gowda	Minister of Railways; 9 November 2014 – 3 September 2017	Succeeded by Piyush Goyal
Preceded by Nirmala Sitharaman; As Minister of State (Independent Charge)	Minister of Commerce and Industry; 3 September 2017 – 30 May 2019	Succeeded by Piyush Goyal
Preceded by Ashok Gajapathi Raju	Ministry of Civil Aviation; 2018 – Present; Additional Charge	Incumbent
