= Chandra Dutt Pande =

Indian politician

Member of Parliament, Rajya Sabha
- In office 1962-1974
- Constituency: Uttar Pradesh

Member of Parliament, Lok Sabha
- In office 1952-1962
- Succeeded by: Krishna Chandra Pant
- Constituency: Nainital, Uttar Pradesh

Personal details
- Born: 1906 Almora, United Provinces, British India
- Died: 1988 (aged 81–82)
- Party: Indian National Congress

Chandra Dutt Pande was an Indian politician. He was a Member of Parliament, representing Uttar Pradesh in the Rajya Sabha the upper house of India's Parliament representing the Indian National Congress.
