= Madhu Dandavate =

Indian physicist and politician

Prof. Madhu Dandavate
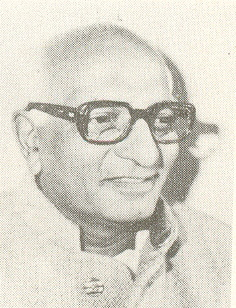

Deputy Chairman of the Planning Commission
- In office 1 August 1996 – 21 March 1998
- Preceded by: Pranab Mukherjee
- Succeeded by: Jaswant Singh
- In office 7 July 1990 – 10 December 1990
- Preceded by: Ramakrishna Hegde
- Succeeded by: Mohan Dharia

Minister of Finance
- In office 2 December 1989 – 10 November 1990
- Prime Minister: V. P. Singh
- Preceded by: Shankarrao Chavan
- Succeeded by: Yashwant Sinha

Minister of Railways
- In office 1977–1979
- Prime Minister: Morarji Desai
- Preceded by: Kamalapati Tripathi
- Succeeded by: Kamalapati Tripathi

Member of Parliament, Lok Sabha
- In office 1971–1991
- Preceded by: Nath Pai
- Succeeded by: Sudhir Sawant
- Constituency: Rajapur, Maharashtra

Member of Maharashtra Legislative Council
- In office 1970–1971

Personal details
- Born: 21 January 1924 Ahmednagar, Bombay Presidency, British India (now in Maharashtra, India)
- Died: 12 November 2005 (aged 81) Mumbai, Maharashtra, India
- Party: Janata Dal
- Other political affiliations: • Janata Party • Praja Socialist Party
- Spouse: Pramila Dandavate (m. 1953; died 2001)
- Children: Uday Dandavate (Son)

Madhu Dandavate (21 January 1924 – 12 November 2005) was an Indian physicist and socialist politician, who served as Minister of Railways in the Morarji Desai ministry, and as Minister of Finance in the V P Singh ministry.

Born in Ahmednagar, Bombay Presidency, Dandavate studied and was employed as a physicist in Bombay, before participating in the Quit India Movement in 1942. After independence, he served as a Member of Parliament from Rajapur in Maharashtra from 1971 to 1991. As an opposition politician, Dandavate was jailed during the Emergency. Serving as Railway Minister from 1977 to 1979, he initiated a number of improvements, most notably providing more comfortable cushioned seats to second-class passengers, a measure that "helped hundreds of millions of people". Later in the late 1980s, he served as Finance Minister.

A prominent socialist politician and opposition leader, Dandavate was respected for his integrity, knowledge, simplicity and pragmatism, with historian Ramachandra Guha placing him among the few ministers who "shall be remembered for having carried out programmes that radically reshaped the lives of their people".

== Early life and career ==
Madhu Dandavate was born in a Marathi Deshastha Brahmin family in Ahmednagar on 21 January 1924, the son of Ramachandra Dandavate. After completing his M.Sc. in Physics from Royal Institute of Science, Bombay, he headed the Physics department at Siddhartha College of Arts and Sciences, Bombay.

== Political career ==
Dandavate entered politics as an independence activist, participating in the Quit India Movement in 1942. He was the leader of a Satyagraha campaign in Goa in 1955 against Portuguese imperialism.

During 1970–71, Dandavate was a member of the Maharashtra Legislative Council. From 1971 to 1990, he was a Member of Parliament, elected to the Lok Sabha for five consecutive terms from Rajapur in Konkan, Maharashtra. He was one of the prominent opposition leaders during Indira Gandhi and Rajiv Gandhi's tenures as Prime Ministers.

Dandavate was arrested during the Emergency in 1975, spending time in Bangalore Central Jail.

After the end of the Emergency and the 1977 elections, Dandavate served as the Minister of Railways in the Morarji Desai ministry. He initiated a number of improvements in the country's rail infrastructure. These included the computerization of railway reservations, which reduced corruption among booking clerks and uncertainty among passengers; sanctioning the first phase of the Konkan Railway in 1978–79, with a line from Apta to Roha; and the repair or replacement of 5000 kilometres of worn-out tracks. Most notably, he introduced cushioned berths for passengers of second-class sleeper coaches, replacing the existing wooden berths, to provide for a more comfortable journey. While initially implemented in the major trunk lines, all trains had these padded berths in their second-class compartments by the end of the 1980s.

As a parliamentarian, one of his major interventions during the enactment of the Anti-Defection Law in 1985 was the incorporation of a safety clause to allow dissent.

Dandavate later served as the Finance Minister in the cabinet of V. P. Singh. His parliamentary career ended after his loss to Major Sudhir Sawant of the Congress in 1991, and he slowly receded from national politics.

He was also the Deputy Chairman of the Planning Commission in 1990, and again from 1996 to 1998.

== Death ==
After a protracted period of suffering from cancer, Dandavate died at the Jaslok Hospital in Mumbai on 12 November 2005, at the age of 81. As per his wishes, his body was donated to the city's J. J. Hospital.

== Personal life ==
Madhu Dandavate was married to Pramila Dandavate, who was also prominently involved in the socialist movement in India, in 1953. She was a member of the 7th Lok Sabha after being elected in the 1980 general election from the Mumbai North Central constituency. During their 18-month detention during the Emergency, with Madhu lodged in Bangalore Central Jail and Pramila in Yerawada Jail in Pune, the couple wrote each other 200 letters, discussing issues like music, books, philosophy and love.

Pramila died on 31 December 2001 after a heart attack. The couple had one son, Uday, who studied at the National Institute of Design, and owns a design research consulting company in San Francisco, US. In 2014, Uday Dandavate joined the Aam Aadmi Party.

== Legacy ==
A prominent socialist politician and opposition leader, Dandavate was known for his incisive speeches laced with wit and humour, often raising issues of public importance during Zero Hour in Parliament. He was also hailed for his integrity and humility.

In India After Gandhi, historian Ramachandra Guha highlights Dandavate's pragmatism, stating that "his socialism eschewed rhetoric against the rich in favour of policies for the poor. As he [Dandavate] put it, 'what I want to do is not degrade the first class but elevate the second class'." Noting his role in the introduction of cushioned seats in trains, Guha writes that "those two inches of foam" have probably "brought more succour to more people than any other initiative by an Indian politician". Guha thus places him among the few ministers who "shall be remembered for having carried out programmes that radically reshaped the lives of their people".

== Bibliography ==
Dandavate authored a number of books. His speeches and lectures have also been published.

- Future of Parliamentary Democracy in India, Harold Laski Institute of Political Science, 1974
- Marx and Gandhi, Popular Prakashan, 1977
- Jayaprakash Narayan, the Man and His Ideas, Popular Prakashan, Bombay 1981
- Evolution of Socialist Policies and Perspective, 1934-1984, Popular Prakashan, 1986
- As the Mind Unfolds: Issues and Personalities, Shipra Publications, 1993, ISBN 8185402191
- Echoes in Parliament: Madhu Dandavate's speeches in Parliament, 1971-1990, Allied Publishers, 1995, ISBN 8170234204
- Quest of Conscience, Shipra Publications, 1998, ISBN 8175410043
- Yusuf Meherally: Quest For New Horizons, National Book Trust, India, 1998 ISBN 8123705530
- Parivartanāce Pāīka: Mahātmā Jotibā Phule Aani Nyāyamūrtī Rānaḍe, Sadhana Prakashan, 2001 (Comparative study in Marathi of social reformers Jyotirao Phule and Mahadev Govind Ranade)
- Jayaprakash Narayan: Struggle with Values: A Centenary Tribute, Allied Publishers, 2002, ISBN 9788177643411
- Dialogue with Life, Allied Publishers, 2005 ISBN 9788177648560
- Social Roots of Gender Injustice, Theosophical Publishing House, 2005 (Lecture delivered at the Theosophical Society, Chennai on 27 December 2001)

Preceded by Kamalapati Tripathi	Minister of Railways; 1977–1979	Succeeded by Kamalapati Tripathi
Preceded by S. B. Chavan	Finance Minister of India; 1989–1990	Succeeded by Yashwant Sinha
