= D. B. Karnik =

- Born: January 14, 1908
- Died: October 14, 2005 (aged 97)
- Occupation: News Editor
- Years active: 1962 – 2005

Dvārakānātha Bhagavanta Karṇika (14 January 1908 - 14 October 2005) was an Indian journalist and author. He was the first editor of Maharashtra Times and held office for five years (June 1962 to September 1967).

== Career ==
Before starting Maharashtra Times, he worked in Kesari and Prabhat newspaper.

He is credited with starting four publications in Maharashtra. He was instrumental, as founder editor, of turning the Maharashtra Times into a dynamic, people oriented newspaper. He held office for a year and a half.

He was very close to Yashwantrao Chavan. He inspired many writers to contribute in the supplements of Maharashtra Times in the initial days. These include P. B. Bhave, and N. S. Phadke.

== Books written ==
- Y.B. Chavan: A Political Biography, about Y. B. Chavan
- This Was a Man (1978), about Nath Pai
- Mānavendranātha Rôya (1967)
- Elana Rôya (एलन रॉय)
- संपादकाचे जीवनस्वप्न
- व्ही. बी. कर्णिक
- राजधानीतील बारा वर्षे
- चित्ती असो द्यावे समाधान

== Awards ==
He was awarded the Ratna Darpan (excellence in media) in 2002.

== Death ==
He died at the age of 97 on at his residence in Worli, Mumbai. He was left with wife and son and two daughters.
