= Panting =

Panting is a form of thermoregulation.

Panting may also refer to:

== People ==
- Elizabeth Panting (née Crook) (1828–1891), British-American Mormon pioneer depicted in the 2011 American historical drama 17 Miracles
- Gerry Panting (1927–1998), Canadian politician and history professor
- James Harwood Panting (1854–1924), British writer
- John Panting (1940–1974), New Zealand-born British sculptor
- Jonquil Panting (born 1966), British radio director
- Matthew Panting (1682–1738), English clergyman and Master of Pembroke College, Oxford
- Sean Panting (born 1970), Canadian musician, actor, and politician

== Other uses ==
- Panting (ship construction)
