= Pant railway station =

Pant railway station may refer to:

- Pant railway station (Brecon Mountain Railway), an operational heritage railway station in Wales.
- Pant railway station (Brecon and Merthyr Tydfil Junction Railway), a disused railway station in Wales.
- Pant railway station (England), a disused railway station in Shropshire, England.
