= Kailash Chandra Pant =

Indian writer and journalist (1936–2026)

- Born: 26 April 1936; Mhow, Indore district, Central Provinces and Berar, British India
- Died: 31 July 2026 (aged 90)
- Occupations: Writer, journalist
- Known for: Promotion of the Hindi language
- Awards: Padma Shri (2026)

Kailash Chandra Pant (26 April 1936 – 31 July 2026) was an Indian writer and journalist. He is an advocate for the Hindi language. In 2026, he was awarded the Padma Shri, the fourth-highest civilian award in India, for his contributions to literature and education.

== Career ==
Pant worked towards the development of the Hindi Bhavan Trust and Krishi Bhavan.

He was the editor of a Hindi literature magazine.

Pant was a member of the Rashtriya Swayamsevak Sangh.

== Personal life and death ==
Pant was born on 26 April 1936 in Mhow, Indore district, Central Provinces and Berar. His father was Leeladhar Pant and his mother was Haripriya Pant.

Pant died from a cardiac arrest on 31 July 2026, at the age of 90.

== Awards and recognition ==
- Padma Shri (2025): Awarded for his contribution to Hindi language and literature. Pant dedicated the honour to those working for the promotion of Hindi.
