= K. C. Pant =

Indian politician (1931–2012)

Krishna Chandra Pant
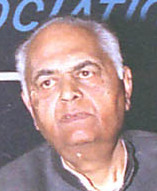

Union Minister of Defence
- In office 12 April 1987 – 2 December 1989
- Prime Minister: Rajiv Gandhi
- Preceded by: V. P. Singh
- Succeeded by: V. P. Singh

Union Minister of Education
- In office 31 December 1984 – 25 September 1985
- Prime Minister: Rajiv Gandhi
- Preceded by: Sheila Kaul
- Succeeded by: P. V. Narasimha Rao

Deputy Chairman of the Planning Commission
- In office 5 February 1999 – 17 June 2004
- Chairman: Atal Bihari Vajpayee
- Preceded by: Jaswant Singh
- Succeeded by: Montek Singh Ahluwalia

Union Minister of State for Home Affairs
- In office 27 June 1970 – 9 November 1973
- Prime Minister: Indira Gandhi
- Preceded by: Ram Niwas Mirdha
- Succeeded by: Om Mehta

Member of Parliament, Lok Sabha
- In office 31 December 1984 – 27 November 1989
- Preceded by: Atal Bihari Vajpayee
- Succeeded by: Lal Krishna Advani
- Constituency: New Delhi
- In office 16 April 1962 – 18 January 1977
- Preceded by: Chandra Dutt Pande
- Succeeded by: Bharat Bhushan
- Constituency: Nainital

Personal details
- Born: 10 August 1931 Bhowali, United Provinces, British India
- Died: 15 November 2012 (aged 81) Delhi, India
- Party: Bharatiya Janata Party
- Other political affiliations: Indian National Congress
- Spouse: Ila Pant
- Children: 2, including Ranjan Pant
- Parent: Govind Ballabh Pant
- Education: University of Lucknow

Krishna Chandra Pant (10 August 1931 – 15 November 2012) was a Member of Parliament for 26 years and was the prime minister's interlocutor on Kashmir. He was a cabinet minister in the Government of India and held several constitutional positions over a period of 37 years. Pant had held the positions of Minister for Defence, Minister of state for Home Affairs, Minister of Steel and Heavy Engineering, Finance, Atomic Energy and Science and Technology. He was the first chairman of the Advisory Board on Energy, chairman of the 10th Finance Commission and the deputy chairman of the Planning Commission of India, the economic planning body of India; his Vision 2020 document was published as India's Development Scenario, Next Decade and Beyond.

== Early life and family ==
Krishna Chandra Pant (K.C. Pant), informally known as "Raja," was born to the freedom fighter Govind Ballabh Pant and Smt. Kalawati Pant on 10 August 1931 in Bhowali, in the Kumaon region of the Himalayas, United Provinces (now Uttarakhand). He spent his early years in Nainital and completed his schooling at St. Joseph's College, Nainital. After independence, he moved to Lucknow when his father was appointed Chief Minister of Uttar Pradesh. He completed his post-graduation from Lucknow University and later went to Germany for further studies. In 1957, he married Ila Pant in Nainital.

== Executive positions held ==
=== Minister of the State for Home Affairs (1971–1973) ===
In the early 1970s, after winning the Lok-Sabha parliamentary election from Nainital, he took over his first ministerial posting as the minister of state for Home Affairs, and resolved two very critical issues of the time. First, he negotiated to maintain Andhra-Telangana as a single state. Secondly he helped the North Eastern states where there was a churning due to Meghalaya being granted full statehood.

=== Minister of education ===
Pant was appointed as the minister for education in 1985. During his tenure he came up with some major campaigns like Education for the Blind, Mass Literacy Campaign, Delinking jobs from degrees, Education for all initiative, Model School for all the districts and some major job-oriented programmes. He also presented and passed the proposal for setting up an open university that would provide higher education to everyone. It was named Indira Gandhi National Open University – IGNOU.

=== Minister of defence (1987–1989) ===
Pant was Union Minister for Defence for the years 1987–89. The major initiatives taken by him were Modernisation of Defence equipment and services upgrading and making it self–sufficient, improving the foreign ties with Russia, US and other countries. He also played a major role in the Agni and Prithvi missile programmes.

== Executive bodies positions held ==
=== Chairman of the 10th Finance Commission (1992–95) ===
Pant was appointed as the Chairman of the 10th Finance Commission by the then Prime Minister Narsimha Rao. He was responsible for giving recommendations for the distributions of the net proceeds of taxes between the Union and the States and also on the norms related to the grants-in-aid allotted to the states to raise their income in addition to other activities like suggesting changes with respect to the net proceeds in terms of additional excise duties etc.

=== Deputy chairman Task Force for establishing the National Security Council (1998) ===
Pant was responsible for heading the long-term strategic planning and formulation of strategy of national security, for the coordination of current decision making and followup of policy implementation and for coordinated intelligence assessment for national security planning and management as the Deputy Chairman of the National Security Council.

=== Deputy chairman of the National Commission on Population (1999) ===
Under Pant's tenure, the National Population Policy with the objective of Population Control, was constituted on 11 April 2000.

=== Deputy chairman, planning commission (1999–2004) ===
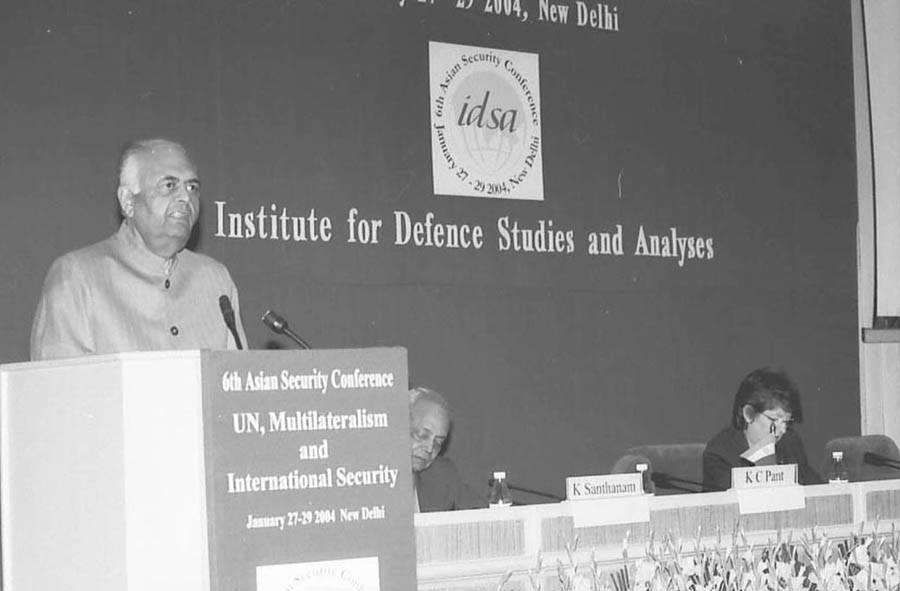
Pant, speaking at the inauguration of the 6 Asian Security Conference organized by the Institute for Defence Studies and Analyses in New Delhi on 27 January 2004

The planning commission was headed by the then prime minister, A.B Vajpayee, and K.C Pant was appointed as the deputy chairman. He, along with his committee members, focused on agricultural development to achieve the goal of Hunger Free India. To ensure food security, he implemented strategies to double the food production, increase the employment and income in the agricultural sector, improved the rural infrastructure through poverty alleviation schemes and started distributing free food grains to the people below the poverty line. During his tenure, he concentrated on the other sectors too. In the education sector, investment was made in the PM's Special Action Plan for the expansion and improvement of social infrastructure in education. Then, measures were adopted to increase the employment in the country. Measures were taken to improve the health of the industrial, railway and telecommunication sectors. On 1 January 2004 Pant as a deputy chairman, planning commission in his official statement confirmed that India's GDP growth was at 8%.

He was chairman of the 10th Finance Commission. Chairman, Centre for Research and Information Systems for the Non-Aligned and Other Developing Countries (RIS), New Delhi; chairman, G.B. Pant Social Science Institute, Allahabad; and, co-chairman, Indo-UK Round Table. K.C. Pant has represented India in several international forums from 1965 onwards. He has widely travelled in India and abroad.

== Death ==
K C Pant died on 15 November 2012 at the age of 81. He left behind his wife Ila Pant and two sons.

== See also ==
- Govind Ballabh Pant
- Ila Pant

Political offices
Preceded by V. P. Singh	Minister of Defence; 1987–1989	Succeeded by Chandra Shekhar Singh
