= D. T. Lakdawala =

D. T. Lakdawala was a noted Indian economist. His contributions in the area of poverty measurement continue to be relevant today. He spent most of his life as an academic at Mumbai University. He also served as Deputy Chairman of the Planning Commission and Director of the Centre for Monitoring Indian Economy.
