= Ila Pant =

Indian politician

Member of the Lok Sabha
- In office 10 March 1998 – 26 April 1999
- Preceded by: Narayan Datt Tiwari
- Succeeded by: Narayan Datt Tiwari
- Constituency: Nainital

Personal details
- Born: 10 March 1938 (age 88) Nainital, United Provinces, British India
- Party: Bhartiya Janata Party
- Spouse: Krishna Chandra Pant
- Children: 2
- Education: Bachelor of Arts
- Alma mater: Allahabad University
- Occupation: Politician and Social worker

Ila Pant (born 10 March 1938) is an Indian politician who was a Member of Parliament in 12th Lok Sabha from Nainital constituency of Uttar Pradesh (now part of Uttarakhand). She was married to former minister K. C. Pant.

== Personal life and family ==
Ila Pant was born in Nainital district (Uttarakhand) on 10 March 1938. She is the daughter of Shobha and Govind Ballabh Pande. She graduated from the University of Allahabad with a Bachelor of Arts degree. On 20 June 1957, she married the politician Krishna Chandra Pant from Uttarakhand Brahmin family. The couple has two sons.

== Politics ==
Ila Pant's father-in-law Govind Ballabh Pant was one of the major architect of modern India and a senior Indian National Congress leader, and her husband went on to become a minister as well. She won the 1998 general election as a Bharatiya Janata Party (BJP) candidate, winning 38.52% of the votes in the Nainital constituency. She defeated the former Chief Minister and Congress leader Narayan Dutt Tiwari by a margin of 15,557 votes.

During 1998-99, she served as a member of the Committee on External Affairs and of the Consultative Committee, Ministry of External Affairs.

She has also served on the Board of Governors of the Pant Nagar University, and as a Secretary of the G.B. Pant Memorial Society in New Delhi.
