= Mahendra Singh Pal =

Indian politician

MP
- In office 1989 - 1991; 2002 - 2004
- Constituency: Nainital

Personal details
- Born: 1 January 1957 (age 69) Allahabad, Uttar Pradesh
- Party: INC previously JD
- Spouse: Lt. Col. Meena Singh Pal

Dr. Mahendra Singh Pal is an Indian politician. He represented the Nainital Lok Sabha constituency from 1989 to 1991, and again from 2002 to 2004. Pal is a member of the Indian National Congress (INC) party and served on the Committee on Urban and Rural Development in 2003. He was designated a Senior Advocate in 2004. He is a leading advocate and practices mainly in the Uttarakhand High Court at Nainital . He was ex Additional Advocate General of Uttarakhand High Court in Supreme Court.

He was also President of the Bar Council of Uttarakhand and High Court Bar Association of Uttarakhand several times and a legal advisor to the Soldier Board in Haldwani.

== Personal life ==
Dr. Mahendra Singh Pal married Lt. Col. Meena Singh Pal (née Shah) on 9 May 1987. He belongs to erstwhile royal family of Askot in Pithoragarh district. He is the second eldest among four brothers and a sister born to second world war veteran Subedar Dev Shamsher Singh Pal and Sona Devi.

== Positions held ==
| Year | Description |
|---|---|
| 1989 - 1991 | Elected to 9th Lok Sabha from Nainital |
| 2002 - 2004 | Elected to 13th Lok Sabha from Nainital in Bye-election (2nd term): Member, Committee on Urban and Rural Development |

== Sources ==
- Lok Sabha
