= Govind Ballabh Pant =

Indian politician and independence activist (1887–1961)

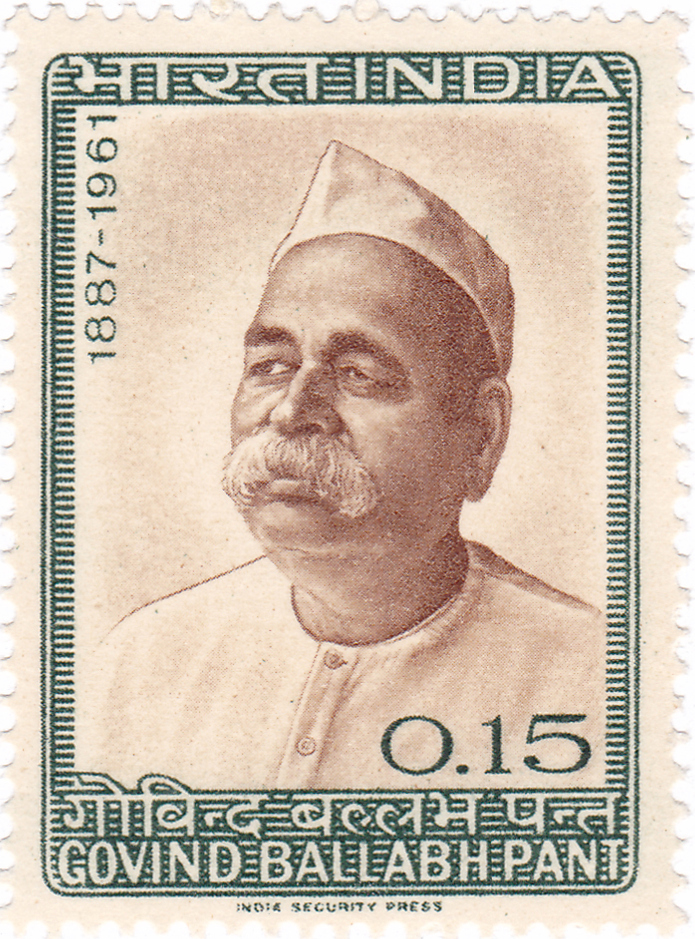
- Postage stamp, 1965

5th Minister of Home Affairs
- In office 10 January 1955 – 7 March 1961
- Prime Minister: Jawaharlal Nehru
- Preceded by: Kailash Nath Katju
- Succeeded by: Lal Bahadur Shastri

1st Chief Minister of Uttar Pradesh
- In office 26 January 1950 – 27 December 1954
- Preceded by: Office established
- Succeeded by: Sampurnanand

2nd Premier of the United Provinces
- In office 1 April 1946 – 25 January 1950
- Preceded by: Vacant
- Succeeded by: Position abolished
- In office 17 July 1937 – 2 November 1939
- Preceded by: Muhammad Ahmad Said Khan Chhatari
- Succeeded by: Vacant

Personal details
- Born: 10 September 1887 Khoont, North-Western Provinces, British India
- Died: 7 March 1961 (aged 73) New Delhi, India
- Party: Indian National Congress
- Children: 3, including Krishna Chandra Pant
- Relatives: Ila Pant (daughter-in-law)
- Education: Allahabad University
- Awards: Bharat Ratna (1957)

Govind Ballabh Pant (10 September 1887 – 7 March 1961) was an Indian independence activist and politician who was the first Chief Minister of Uttar Pradesh. Alongside Mahatma Gandhi, Jawaharlal Nehru and Vallabhbhai Patel, Pant was a key figure in the Indian independence movement and later a pivotal figure in the Indian government. He was one of the foremost political leaders of Uttar Pradesh (then known as United Provinces) and a key player in the successful movement to establish Hindi as the official language of Indian Union..

Today, several Indian hospitals, educational institutions and foundations bear his name. Pant received India's highest civilian honour, the Bharat Ratna, in 1957.

== Early life ==
Govind Ballabh Pant was born on 10 September 1887 in Khoont village near Almora. He was born in a Marathi Karhade Brahmin family that had migrated from the present day northern Karnataka to Kumaon region. The name of his mother was Govindi Bai. His maternal grandfather, Badri Dutt Joshi, an important local government official who played a significant role in shaping his personality and political views, raised Govind because his father, Manorath Pant, was a government official who was constantly on the move.

Pant studied at Allahabad University and subsequently worked as a lawyer in Kashipur. Here, he began active work against the British Raj in 1914, when he helped a local parishad, or village council, in their successful challenge of coolie begar, a law requiring locals to provide free transportation of the luggage of travelling British officials.

== In the freedom struggle ==
In 1921, Pant entered politics and was elected to the Legislative Council of the United Provinces of Agra and Oudh. He was re-elected to the Council in 1924 as an independent and then joined the Swaraj Party and was re-elected in 1926 as a Swaraj Party candidate.

Known as an extremely capable lawyer, Pant was appointed by the Congress party to initially represent Ramprasad Bismill, Ashfaqulla Khan and other revolutionaries involved in the Kakori case in the mid 1920s. He participated in the protests against Simon Commission in 1928. Jawaharlal Nehru, in his autobiography, mentions how Pant stood by him during the protests and his large figure made him an easy target for the police. In those protests he sustained severe injuries which prevented him from straightening his back for the rest of his life.

In 1930, he was arrested and imprisoned for several weeks for organising a Salt March inspired by Gandhi's earlier actions. In 1933, he was arrested along with Harsh Dev Bahuguna (Gandhi of Choukot) and imprisoned for seven months for attending a session of the then-banned provincial Congress. In 1935, the ban was rescinded, and Pant joined the new Legislative Council. During the Second World War, Pant acted as the tiebreaker between Gandhi's faction, which advocated supporting the British Crown in their war effort, and Subhas Chandra Bose's faction, which advocated taking advantage of the situation to expel the British Raj by all means necessary. He increased his support base and influence in Lucknow and surrounding areas of Oudh by seeking help and guidance from Chaubey Mukta Prasad, a civil engineer and public figure. In 1934, the Congress ended its boycott of the legislatures and put up candidates, and Pant was elected to the Central Legislative Assembly. He became deputy leader of the Congress party in the Assembly.

In 1940, Pant was arrested and imprisoned for helping organise the Satyagraha movement. In 1942 he was arrested again, this time for signing the Quit India resolution, and spent three years in Ahmednagar Fort along with other members of the Congress working committee until March 1945, at which point Jawaharlal Nehru pleaded successfully for Pant's release, on grounds of failing health.

== Premier of United Provinces ==
Pant was sworn in as the Premier of the United Provinces on 17 July 1937. He also took the portfolios of Home, Finance, and General Administration and Forests. This ministry lasted till 1939 when all Congress ministries in British Indian provinces resigned and the provinces were placed under the Governor's rule.

In 1945, the British Labour government ordered new elections to the Provincial legislatures. The Congress won a majority in the 1946 elections in the United Provinces and Pant was again the Premier.

Pant continued as the head of the government of United Provinces even after India's independence in 1947 till 24 January 1950 when the province was renamed as Uttar Pradesh.

== Chief Minister of Uttar Pradesh ==
After the Constitution of India came into force, Pant became the Chief Minister of Uttar Pradesh, a position he held till 1954. His judicious reforms and stable governance in the Uttar Pradesh stabilised the economic condition of the most populous State of India.

The Ram Janmabhoomi issue emerged during his rule. The idols of Rama and Sita were installed inside the Babri Masjid on the night of 22–23 December 1949 and the devotees began to gather from the next day. Home Minister Vallabhbhai Patel and Prime Minister Jawaharlal Nehru directed Pant to remove the idols, however Pant was not willing to remove the idols and added that "there is a reasonable chance of success, but things are still in a fluid state and it will be hazardous to say more at this stage". By 1950, the state took control of the structure under section 145 CrPC and allowed Hindus, not Muslims, to perform their worship at the site.

He played a significant role in developing panchayat system in the state. He also urged farmers to become self-reliant and educate their children and strive on a co-operative basis to enhance their life and ways of cultivation.

== Union Home Minister of India ==
Pant served as Union Home Minister from 1955 to 1961. Pant was appointed Minister of Home Affairs in the Union Cabinet on 10 January 1955 in New Delhi by Jawaharlal Nehru. As Home Minister, his chief achievement was the re-organisation of States along linguistic lines. He was also responsible for the establishment of Hindi as an official language of the central government and a few states.

During his tenure as the Home Minister, Pant was awarded the Bharat Ratna on 26 January 1957.

== Death ==
In 1960, he suffered a heart attack. He was treated by top doctors in India, including his friend Dr Bidhan Chandra Roy, the then Chief Minister of West Bengal. His health started deteriorating and he died on 7 March 1961 at the age of 73, from a cerebral stroke. At that time he was still in office as the Home Minister of India.

Mourning him, Dr Rajendra Prasad, the then President of India was quoted as saying, "I had known Pandit Govind Ballabh Pant since 1922 and in this long period of association it had been my privilege to receive from him not only consideration but also affection. This is no time to assess his labour and his achievements. The grief is too intense for words. I can only pray for peace to his soul and strength to those who loved and admired him."

== Institutions and monuments ==
- Govind Ballabh Pant Social Science Institute, Allahabad
- Govind Ballabh Pant University of Agriculture and Technology, Pantnagar
- G. B. Pant National Institute of Himalayan Environment
- Govind Ballabh Pant Engineering College, Pauri Garhwal, Uttarakhand
- Govind Ballabh Pant Engineering College, Delhi
- Govind Ballabh Pant Sagar is an Artificial lake at Sonebhadra, Uttar Pradesh
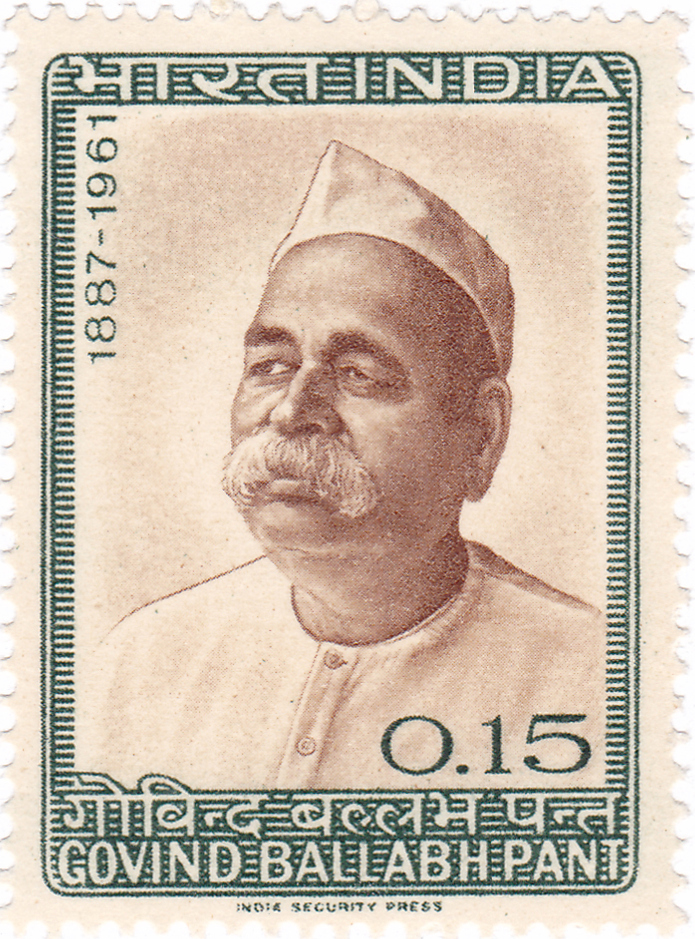
Pant on a 1965 stamp of India

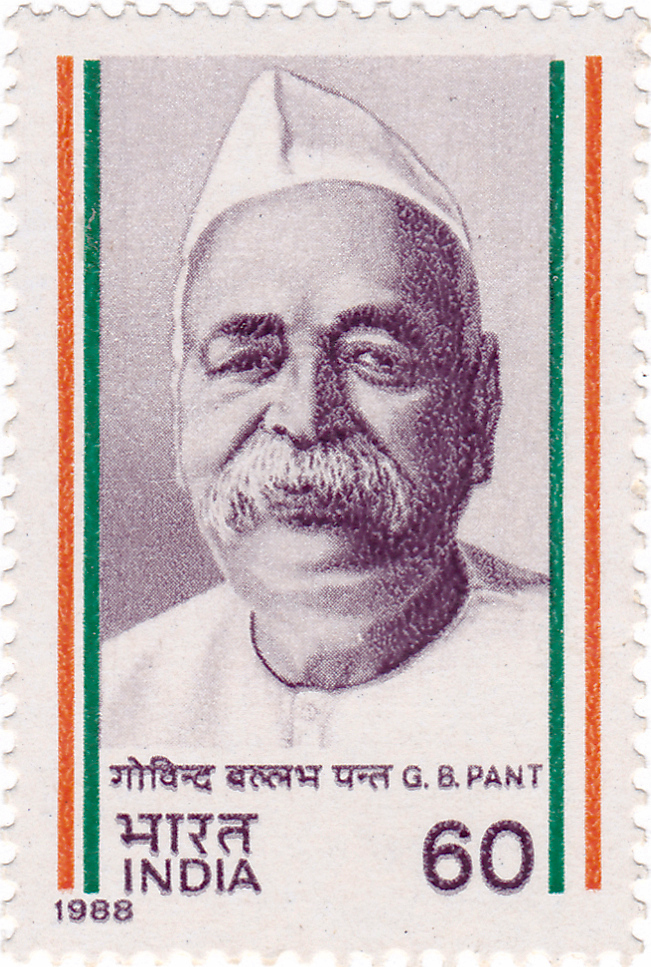
Pant on a 1988 stamp of India

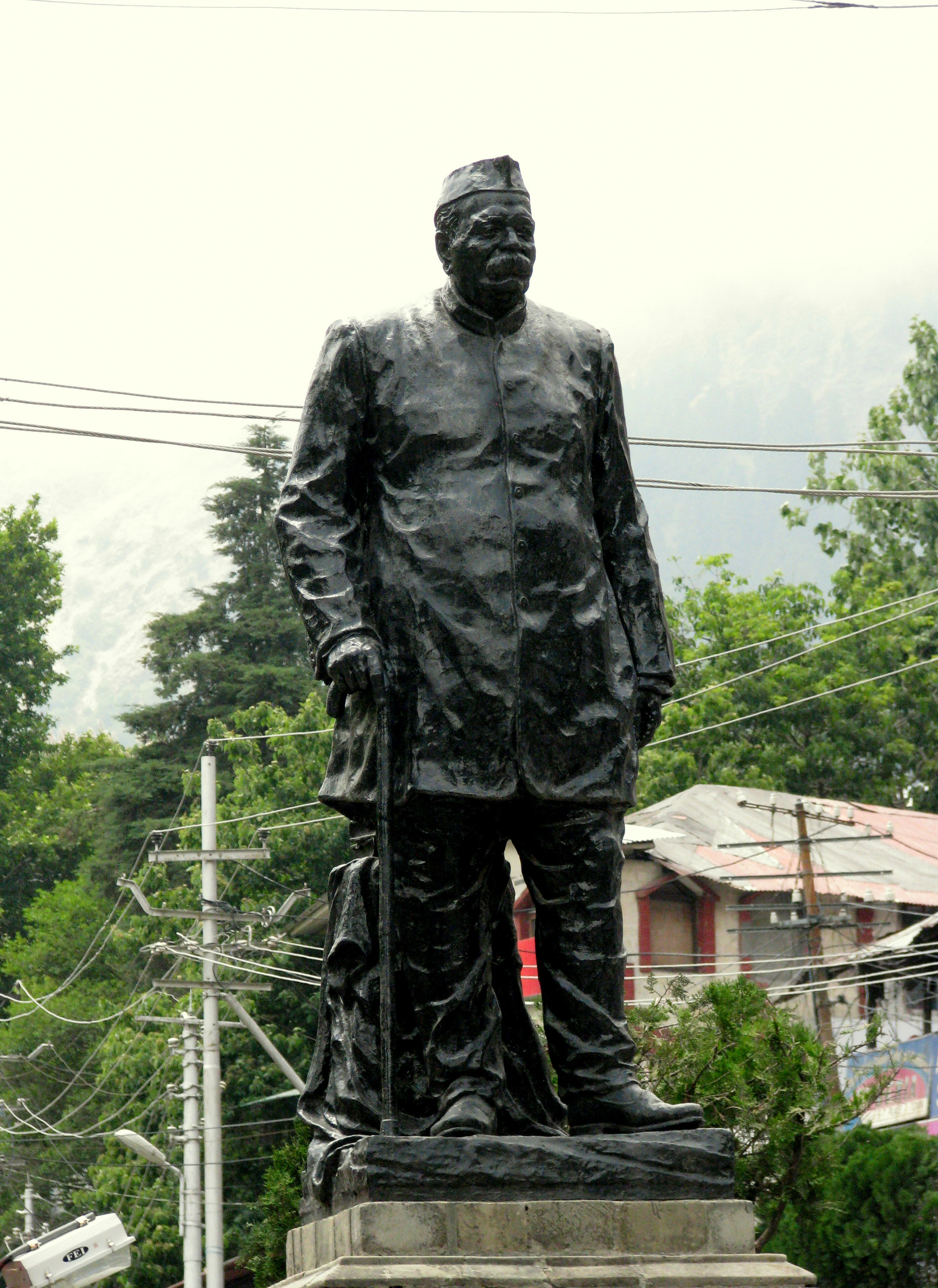
Statue of Pant at Mall Road, Nainital

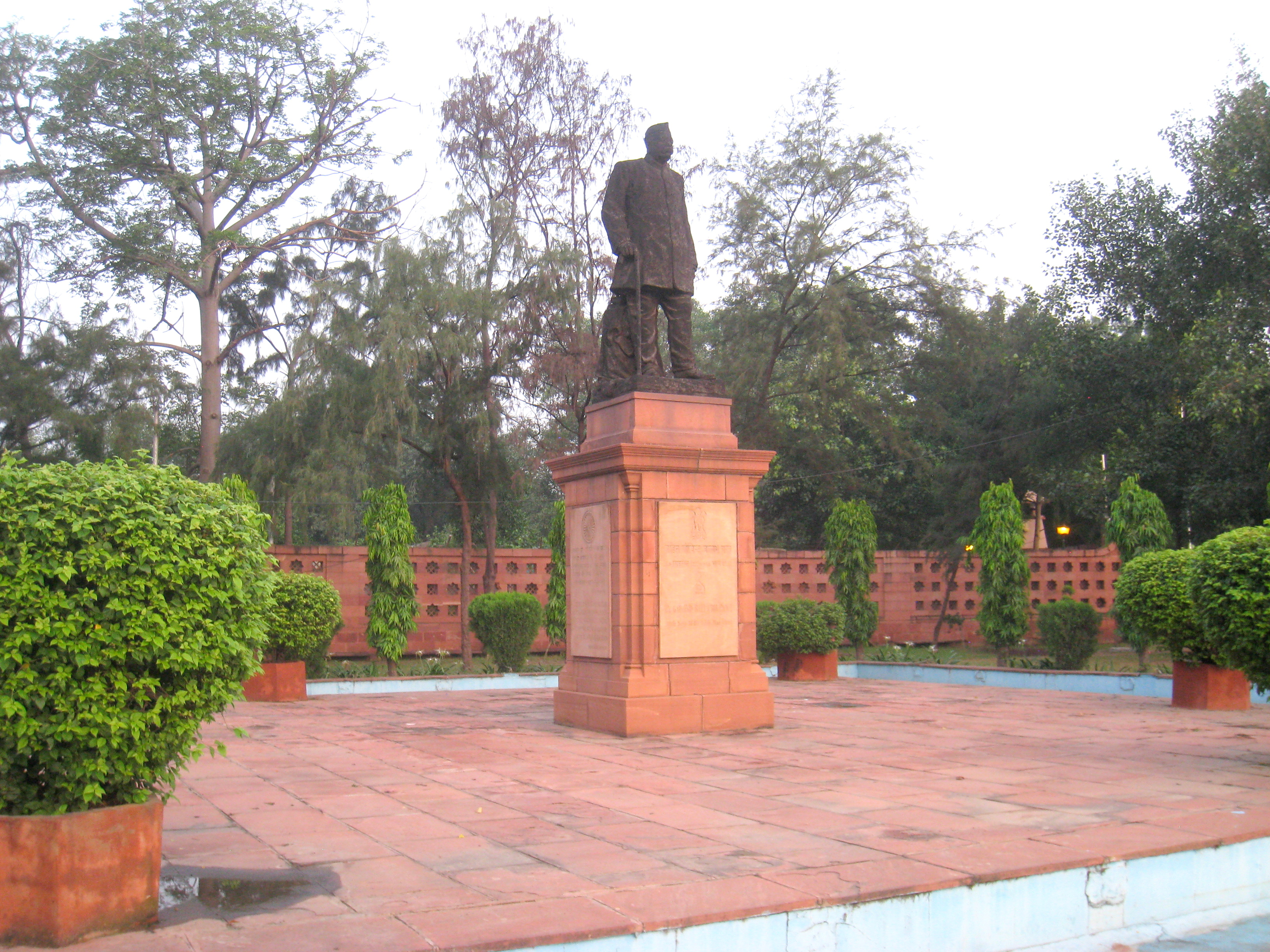
Statue of Pant near Sansad Bhavan, New Delhi

== Family ==
Govind Ballabh Pant's son, Krishna Chandra Pant, was also a politician.

== See also ==
- K. C. Pant
- Ila Pant

Political offices
Preceded by Nawab Sir Muhammad Ahmad Said Khan Chhatari	Chief Minister of United Provinces; 17 July 1937 – 2 November 1939	Succeeded by Vacant
Preceded by Vacant	Chief Minister of United Provinces; 1 April 1946 – 25 January 1950	Succeeded by Post abolished United Provinces renamed to Uttar Pradesh
Preceded by New Creation	Chief Minister of Uttar Pradesh; 26 January 1950 – 27 December 1954	Succeeded by Sampurnanand
Preceded by Kailash Nath Katju	Union Home Minister; 10 January 1955 – 7 March 1961	Succeeded by Lal Bahadur Sastri
