= 11th Lok Sabha =

Lower House members elected in 1996

←	10th	12th	→
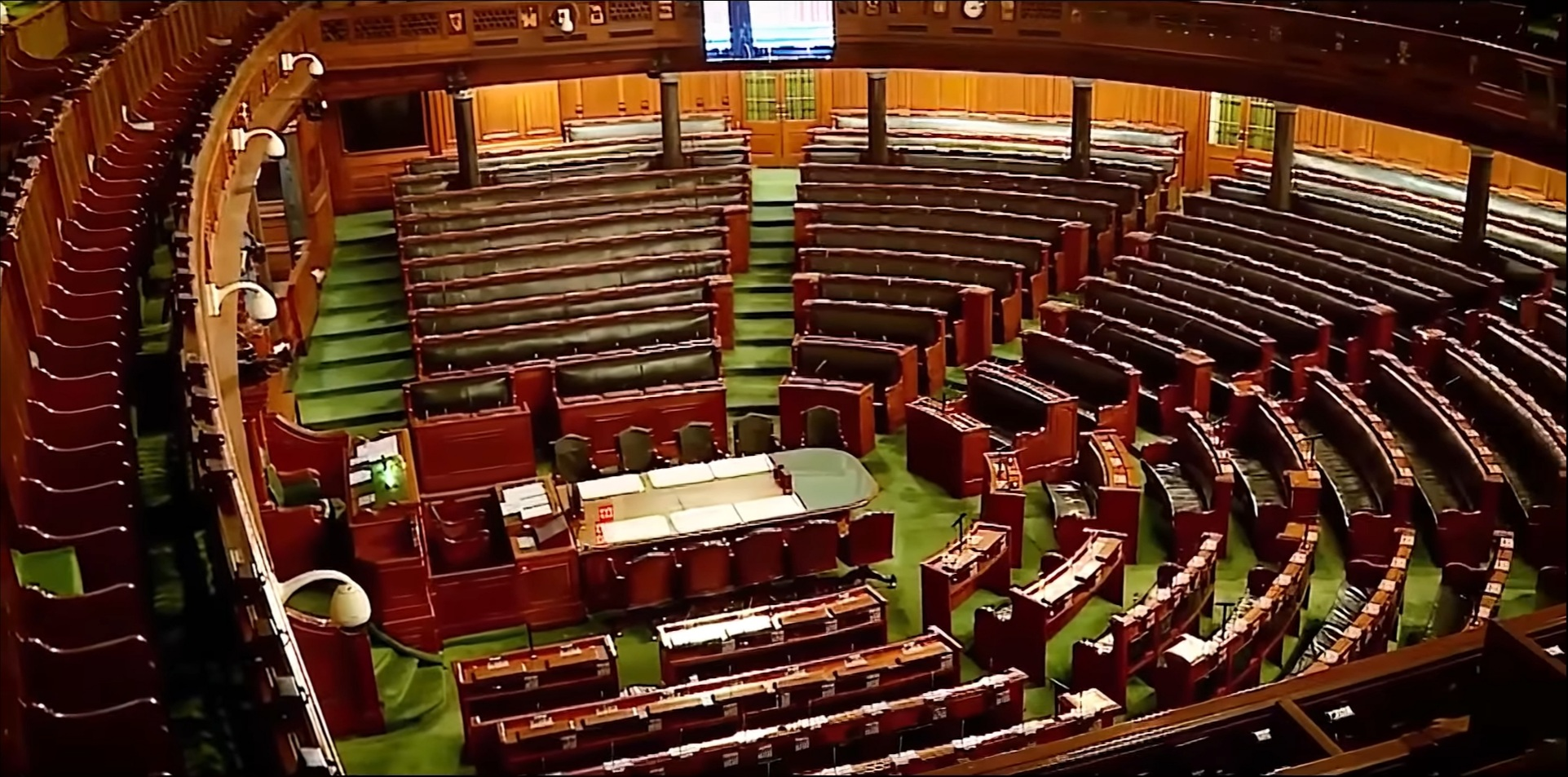
- View of Lok Sabha chamber in the Old Parliament House, New Delhi

Overview
- Legislative body: Indian Parliament

The 11th Lok Sabha was constituted after April–May 1996 general elections. The result of the election was a hung parliament, which would see three Prime Ministers in two years and force the country back to the polls in 1998. Atal Bihari Vajpayee of Bharatiya Janata Party, the single largest party to win this election, winning 67 more seats than previous 10th Lok Sabha, formed the government which lasted for only 13 days.

United Front: 192 seats Bharatiya Janata Party Alliance: 187 seats Congress Alliance: 140 seats Others: 26 seats

The United Front was created and got support from 332 members out of the 545 seats in the Lok Sabha, resulting in H. D. Deve Gowda from the Janata Dal being the 11th Prime Minister of India. Later I. K. Gujral, took the command of the country but when Lalu Prasad Yadav left Janta Dal and formed his own party, 11th Lok Sabha was dissolved to get a fresh mandate from the voters for next 12th Lok Sabha in the 1998 Indian general election.

The Lok Sabha (House of the People) is the lower house in the Parliament of India. 4 sitting members from Rajya Sabha, the Upper House of Indian Parliament, were elected to 11th Lok Sabha after the 1996 Indian general election.

List of Members of the 11th Lok Sabha (15 May 1996 – 4 December 1997) elected:

== Members ==
- Speaker
  - P. A. Sangma from 23 May 1996 to 23 March 1998
- Deputy Speaker:
  - Suraj Bhan from 12 July 1996 to 4 December 1997
- Secretary General:
  - Surendra Mishra from 1 January 1996 to 15 July 1996
  - S. Gopalan from 15 July 1996 to 14 July 1999

== Prime Ministers ==
- Atal Bihari Vajpayee from 16 May 1996 to 1 June 1996 from Bharatiya Janata Party
- H. D. Deve Gowda from 1 June 1996 to 21 April 1997 from Janata Dal United Front
- I. K. Gujral from 21 April 1997 to 19 March 1998 from Janata Dal United Front

== List of members by state ==
The list of members as published by the Election Commission of India:

=== Andhra Pradesh ===
No.	Constituency	Type	Name of Elected M.P.	Party affiliation
1	Srikakulam	GEN	Yerrannaidu Kinjarapu	Telugu Desam Party
2	Parvathipuram	ST	Pradeep Kumar Dev Vyricherla	Indian National Congress
3	Bobbili	GEN	Kondapalli Pydithalli Naidu	Telugu Desam Party
4	Visakhapatnam	GEN	T. Subbarami Reddy	Indian National Congress
5	Bhadrachalam	ST	Sode Ramaiah	Communist Party of India
6	Anakapalli	GEN	Chintakayala Ayyanna Patrudu	Telugu Desam Party
7	Kakinada	GEN	Gopal Krishna Thota	Telugu Desam Party
8	Rajahmundry	GEN	Ravindra Chitturi	Indian National Congress
9	Amalapuram	SC	K. S. R. Murthy	Indian National Congress
10	Narasapur	GEN	Kothapalli Subbarayudu	Telugu Desam Party
11	Eluru	GEN	Bolla Bulli Ramaiah	Telugu Desam Party
12	Machilipatnam	GEN	Kaikala Satyanarayana	Telugu Desam Party
13	Vijayawada	GEN	Upendra Parvathaneni	Indian National Congress
14	Tenali	GEN	Sarada Tadiparthi	Telugu Desam Party
15	Guntur	GEN	Rayapati Sambasiva Rao	Indian National Congress
16	Bapatla	GEN	Ummareddy Venkateswarlu	Telugu Desam Party
17	Narasaraopet	GEN	Sydaiah Kota	Telugu Desam Party
18	Ongole	GEN	Magunta Sreenivasulu Reddy	Indian National Congress
19	Nellore	SC	Panabaka Lakshmi	Indian National Congress
20	Tirupathi	SC	Nelavala Subrahmanyam	Indian National Congress
21	Chittoor	GEN	Nuthanakalva Ramakrishna Reddy	Telugu Desam Party
22	Rajampet	GEN	Sai Prathap Annayyagari	Indian National Congress
23	Cuddapah	GEN	Y. S. Rajasekhara Reddy	Indian National Congress
24	Hindupur	GEN	S. Ramachandra Reddy	Telugu Desam Party
25	Anantapur	GEN	Anantha Venkatarami Reddy	Indian National Congress
26	Kurnool	GEN	Kotla Vijaya Bhaskara Reddy	Indian National Congress
27	Nandyal	GEN	Bhuma Nagi Reddy	Telugu Desam Party
28	Nagarkurnool	SC	Manda Jagannath	Telugu Desam Party
29	Mahabubnagar	GEN	Mallikarjun Goud	Indian National Congress
30	Hyderabad	GEN	Sultan Salahuddin Owaisi	All India Majlis-e-Ittehadul Muslimeen
31	Secunderabad	GEN	P. V. Rajeshwar Rao	Indian National Congress
32	Siddipet	SC	Nandi Yellaiah	Indian National Congress
33	Medak	GEN	M. Baga Reddy	Indian National Congress
34	Nizamabad	GEN	Atmacharan Reddy	Indian National Congress
35	Adilabad	GEN	Samudrala Venugopal Chary	Telugu Desam Party
36	Peddapalli	SC	G. Venkat Swamy	Indian National Congress
37	Karimnagar	GEN	L. Gandula Ramana	Telugu Desam Party
38	Hanamkonda	GEN	Kamaluddin Ahmed	Indian National Congress
39	Warangal	GEN	Azmeera Chandulal	Telugu Desam Party
40	Khammam	GEN	Veerabhadram Tammineni	Communist Party of India
41	Nalgonda	GEN	Bommagani Dharma Bhiksham	Communist Party of India
42	Miryalguda	GEN	Baddam Narsimha Reddy	Indian National Congress

=== Arunachal Pradesh ===
No.	Constituency	Type	Name of Elected M.P.	Party affiliation
1	Arunachal West	GEN	Tomo Riba	Independent
2	Arunachal East	GEN	Wangcha Rajkumar	Independent

=== Assam ===
No.	Constituency	Type	Name of Elected M.P.	Party affiliation
1	Karimganj	SC	Dwaraka Nath Das	Bharatiya Janta Party
2	Silchar	GEN	Santosh Mohan Dev	Indian National Congress
3	Autonomous District	ST	Jayanta Rongpi	Autonomous State Demand Committee
4	Dhubri	GEN	Nurul Islam	Indian National Congress
5	Kokrajhar	ST	Louis Islary	Independent
6	Barpeta	GEN	Uddabh Barman	Communist Party of India
7	Gauhati	GEN	Prabin Chandra Sarma	Asom Gana Parishad
8	Mangaldoi	GEN	Birendra Prasad Baishya	Asom Gana Parishad
9	Tezpur	GEN	Iswar Prasanna Hazarika	Indian National Congress
10	Nowgong	GEN	Muhi Ram Saikia	Asom Gana Parishad
11	Kaliabor	GEN	Keshab Mahanta	Asom Gana Parishad
12	Jorhat	GEN	Bijoy Krishna Handique	Indian National Congress
13	Dibrugarh	GEN	Paban Singh Ghatowar	Indian National Congress
14	Lakhimpur	GEN	Arun Kumar Sarma	Asom Gana Parishad

=== Bihar ===
No.	Constituency	Type	Name of Elected M.P.	Party affiliation
1	Bagaha	SC	Mahendra Baitha	Samata Party
2	Bettiah	GEN	Madan Prasad Jaiswal	Bharatiya Janata Party
3	Motihari	GEN	Radha Mohan Singh	Bharatiya Janata Party
4	Gopalganj	GEN	Lal Babu Prasad Yadav	Rashtriya Janata Dal
5	Siwan	GEN	Mohammad Shahabuddin	Rashtriya Janata Dal
6	Maharajganj	GEN	Ram Bahadur Singh	Samajwadi Janata Party
7	Chapra	GEN	Rajiv Pratap Rudy	Bharatiya Janata Party
8	Hajipur	SC	Ram Vilas Paswan	Janata Dal
9	Vaishali	GEN	Raghuvansh Prasad Singh	Rashtriya Janata Dal
10	Muzaffarpur	GEN	Jai Narain Prasad Nishad	Janata Dal
11	Sitamarhi	GEN	Nawal Kishore Rai	Janata Dal
12	Sheohar	GEN	Anand Mohan	Samata Party
13	Madhubani	GEN	Chaturanan Mishra	Communist Party of India
14	Jhanjharpur	GEN	Devendra Prasad Yadav	Janata Dal
15	Darbhanga	GEN	Mohammad Ali Ashraf Fatmi	Rashtriya Janata Dal
16	Rosera	SC	Pitambar Paswan	Rashtriya Janata Dal
17	Samastipur	GEN	Ajit Kumar Mehta	Rashtriya Janata Dal
18	Barh	GEN	Nitish Kumar	Samata Party
19	Balia	GEN	Shatrughan Prasad Singh	Communist Party of India
20	Saharsa	GEN	Dinesh Chandra Yadav	Janata Dal
21	Madhepura	GEN	Sharad Yadav	Janata Dal
22	Araria	SC	Sukdeo Paswan	Janata Dal
23	Kishanganj	GEN	Taslimuddin	Rashtriya Janata Dal
24	Purnea	GEN	Pappu Yadav	Samajwadi Party
25	Katihar	GEN	Tariq Anwar	Indian National Congress
26	Rajmahal	ST	Thomas Hansda	Indian National Congress
27	Dumka	ST	Shibu Soren	Jharkhand Mukti Morcha
28	Godda	GEN	Jagadambi Prasad Yadav	Bharatiya Janata Party
29	Banka	GEN	Giridhari Yadav	Janata Dal
30	Bhagalpur	GEN	Chunchun Prasad Yadav	Rashtriya Janata Dal
31	Khagaria	GEN	Anil Kumar Yadav	Rashtriya Janata Dal
32	Monghyr	GEN	Brahmanand Mandal	Samata Party
33	Begusarai	GEN	Ramendra Kumar	Independent
34	Nalanda	GEN	George Fernandes	Samata Party
35	Patna	GEN	Ram Kripal Yadav	Rashtriya Janata Dal
36	Arrah	GEN	Chandradeo Prasad Verma	Rashtriya Janata Dal
37	Buxar	GEN	Lalmuni Chaubey	Bharatiya Janata Party
38	Sasaram	SC	Muni Lall	Bharatiya Janata Party
39	Bikramganj	GEN	Kanti Singh	Rashtriya Janata Dal
40	Aurangabad	GEN	Virendra Kumar Singh	Rashtriya Janata Dal
41	Jahanabad	GEN	Ramashray Prasad Singh	Communist Party of India
42	Nawada	SC	Kameshwar Paswan	Bharatiya Janata Party
43	Gaya	SC	Bhagwati Devi	Rashtriya Janata Dal
44	Chatra	GEN	Dhirendra Agarwal	Bharatiya Janata Party
45	Kodarma	GEN	R.L.P. Verma	Bharatiya Janata Party
46	Giridih	GEN	Ravindra Kumar Pandey	Bharatiya Janata Party
47	Dhanbad	GEN	Rita Verma	Bharatiya Janata Party
48	Hazaribagh	GEN	M. L. Vishwakarma	Bharatiya Janata Party
49	Ranchi	GEN	Ram Tahal Choudhary	Bharatiya Janata Party
50	Jamshedpur	GEN	Nitish Bharadwaj	Bharatiya Janata Party
51	Singhbhum	ST	Chitrasen Sinku	Bharatiya Janata Party
52	Khunti	ST	Kariya Munda	Bharatiya Janata Party
53	Lohardaga	ST	Lalit Oraon	Bharatiya Janata Party
54	Palamau	SC	Braj Mohan Ram	Bharatiya Janata Party

=== Goa ===
No.	Constituency	Type	Name of Elected M.P.	Party affiliation
1	Panaji	GEN	Ramakant Khalap	Maharashtrawadi Gomantak Party
2	Mormugao	GEN	Churchill Alemao	United Goans Democratic Party

=== Gujarat ===
No.	Constituency	Type	Name of Elected M.P.	Party affiliation
1	Kutch	GEN	Pushpdan Shambhudan Gadhavi	Bharatiya Janata Party
2	Surendranagar	GEN	Sanat Mehta	Indian National Congress
3	Jamnagar	GEN	Chandresh Patel Kordia	Bharatiya Janata Party
4	Rajkot	GEN	Vallabhbhai Kathiria	Bharatiya Janata Party
5	Porbandar	GEN	Gordhanbhai Javia	Bharatiya Janata Party
6	Junagadh	GEN	Bhavna Chikhalia	Bharatiya Janata Party
7	Amreli	GEN	Dileep Sanghani	Bharatiya Janata Party
8	Bhavnagar	GEN	Rajendrasinh Rana	Bharatiya Janata Party
9	Dhandhuka	SC	Ratilal Kalidas Varma	Bharatiya Janata Party
10	Ahmedabad	GEN	Harin Pathak	Bharatiya Janata Party
11	Gandhinagar	GEN	Atal Bihari Vajpayee	Bharatiya Janata Party
11	Gandhinagar	GEN	Vijaybhai Patel (By Poll)	Bharatiya Janata Party
12	Mehsana	GEN	A.K. Patel	Bharatiya Janata Party
13	Patan	SC	Mahesh Kanodia	Bharatiya Janata Party
14	Banaskantha	GEN	B.K. Gadhvi	Indian National Congress
15	Sabarkantha	GEN	Nisha Chaudhary	Indian National Congress
16	Kapadvanj	GEN	Jaysinhji Chauhan	Bharatiya Janata Party
17	Dohad	ST	Damor Somjibhai Punjabhai	Indian National Congress
18	Godhra	GEN	Shantilal Patel	Indian National Congress
19	Kaira	GEN	Dinsha Patel	Indian National Congress
20	Anand	GEN	Ishwarbhai Chavda	Indian National Congress
21	Chhota Udaipur	ST	Naranbhai Rathwa	Indian National Congress
22	Baroda	GEN	Satyajitsinh Gaekwad	Indian National Congress
23	Broach	GEN	Chandubhai Deshmukh	Bharatiya Janata Party
24	Surat	GEN	Kashiram Rana	Bharatiya Janata Party
25	Mandvi	ST	Chhitubhai Gamit	Indian National Congress
26	Bulsar	ST	Manibhai Chaudhary	Bharatiya Janata Party

=== Haryana ===
No.	Constituency	Type	Name of Elected M.P.	Party affiliation
1	Ambala	SC	Suraj Bhan	Bharatiya Janata Party
2	Kurukshetra	GEN	O.P. Jindal	Haryana Vikas Party
3	Karnal	GEN	Ishwar Dayal Swami	Bharatiya Janata Party
4	Sonepat	GEN	Arvind Kumar Sharma	Independent
5	Rohtak	GEN	Bhupinder Singh Hooda	Indian National Congress
6	Faridabad	GEN	Chaudhary Ramchandra Baindra	Bharatiya Janata Party
7	Mahendragarh	GEN	Rao Ram Singh	Bharatiya Janata Party
8	Bhiwani	GEN	Surender Singh	Haryana Vikas Party
9	Hissar	GEN	Jai Prakash	Haryana Vikas Party
10	Sirsa	SC	Selja Kumari	Indian National Congress

=== Himachal Pradesh ===
No.	Constituency	Type	Name of Elected M.P.	Party affiliation
1	Simla	SC	Krishan Dutt Sultanpuri	Indian National Congress
2	Mandi	GEN	Sukh Ram	Indian National Congress
3	Kangra	GEN	Sat Mahajan	Indian National Congress
4	Hamirpur	GEN	Bikram Singh	Indian National Congress

=== Jammu & Kashmir ===
No.	Constituency	Type	Name of Elected M.P.	Party affiliation
1	Baramulla	GEN	Ghulam Rasool Kar	Indian National Congress
2	Srinagar	GEN	Ghulam Mohammad Mir	Indian National Congress
3	Anantnag	GEN	Mohammad Maqbool Dar	Janata Dal
4	Ladakh	GEN	Phuntsog Namgyal	Indian National Congress
5	Udhampur	GEN	Chaman Lal Gupta	Bharatiya Janata Party
6	Jammu	GEN	Mangat Ram Sharma	Indian National Congress

=== Karnataka ===
Out 28 Seats - JDS 15, BJP 07 and 06 INC.

No.	Constituency	Type	Name of Elected M.P.	Party affiliation
1	Bidar	SC	Ramchandra Veerappa	Bharatiya Janata Party
2	Gulbarga	GEN	Qamar ul Islam	Janata Dal
3	Raichur	GEN	Raja Rangappa Naik	Janata Dal
4	Koppal	GEN	Basavaraj Rayareddy	Janata Dal
5	Bellary	GEN	K.C. Kondaiah	Indian National Congress
6	Davangere	GEN	G. M. Siddeshwara	Bharatiya Janata Party
7	Chitradurga	GEN	Puli Kodandaramaiah	Janata Dal
8	Tumkur	GEN	C. N. Bhaskarappa	Janata Dal
9	Chikballapur	GEN	R.L. Jalappa	Janata Dal
10	Kolar	SC	K.H. Muniyappa	Indian National Congress
11	Kanakapura	GEN	H. D. Kumaraswamy	Janata Dal
12	Bangalore North	GEN	C. Narayanaswamy	Janata Dal
13	Bangalore South	GEN	Ananth Kumar	Bharatiya Janata Party
14	Mandya	GEN	Ambareesh	Janata Dal
15	Chamarajanagar	SC	Siddaraju A.	Janata Dal
16	Mysore	GEN	Srikanta Datta Narsimharaja Wodeyar	Indian National Congress
17	Mangalore	GEN	Dhananjay Kumar	Bharatiya Janata Party
18	Udupi	GEN	Oscar Fernandes	Indian National Congress
19	Hassan	GEN	Rudresh Gowda	Janata Dal
20	Chikmagalur	GEN	B. L. Shankar	Janata Dal
21	Shimoga	GEN	S. Bangarappa	Indian National Congress
22	Kanara	GEN	Ananth Kumar Hegde	Bharatiya Janata Party
23	Dharwad South	GEN	Imam Sanadi	Indian National Congress
24	Dharwad North	GEN	Vijay Sankeshwar	Bharatiya Janata Party
25	Belgaum	GEN	Shivanand Hemappa Koujalgi	Janata Dal
26	Chikkodi	SC	Ratnamala D. Savanoor	Janata Dal
27	Bagalkot	GEN	H. Y. Meti	Janata Dal
28	Bijapur	GEN	Basangouda Patil Yatnal	Bharatiya Janata Party

=== Kerala ===
No.	Constituency	Type	Name of Elected M.P.	Party affiliation
1	Kasaragod	GEN	T. Govindan	Communist Party of India
2	Cannanore	GEN	Mullappally Ramachandran	Indian National Congress
3	Vatakara	GEN	O. Bharathan	Communist Party of India
4	Calicut	GEN	M.P. Veerendra Kumar	Janata Dal
5	Manjeri	GEN	E. Ahamed	Muslim League Kerala State Committee
6	Ponnani	GEN	G. M. Banatwalla	Muslim League Kerala State Committee
7	Palghat	GEN	N. N. Krishnadas	Communist Party of India
8	Ottapalam	SC	S. Ajaya Kumar	Communist Party of India
9	Trichur	GEN	V.V. Raghavan	Communist Party of India
10	Mukundapuram	GEN	P. C. Chacko	Indian National Congress
11	Ernakulam	GEN	Xavier Arakkal	Independent
12	Muvattupuzha	GEN	P. C. Thomas	Kerala Congress
13	Kottayam	GEN	P. J. Kurien	Indian National Congress
14	Idukki	GEN	A.C. Jose	Indian National Congress
15	Alleppey	GEN	V. M. Sudheeran	Indian National Congress
16	Mavelikara	GEN	Ramesh Chennithala	Indian National Congress
17	Adoor	SC	Kodikunnil Suresh	Indian National Congress
18	Quilon	GEN	N. K. Premachandran	Revolutionary Socialist Party
19	Chirayinkil	GEN	A. Sampath	Communist Party of India
20	Trivandrum	GEN	K.V. Surendra Nath	Communist Party of India

=== Madhya Pradesh ===
BJP: 28 seats out of 40; Congress: 9 seats.

No.	Constituency	Type	Name of Elected M.P.	Party affiliation
1	Morena	SC	Ashok Chhabiram	Bharatiya Janata Party
2	Bhind	GEN	Dr. Ramlakhan Singh	Bharatiya Janata Party
3	Gwalior	GEN	Madhavrao Scindia	Madhya Pradesh Vikas Congress
4	Guna	GEN	Rajmata Vijayraje Scindia	Bharatiya Janata Party
5	Sagar	SC	Virendra Kumar	Bharatiya Janata Party
6	Khajuraho	GEN	Uma Bharti	Bharatiya Janata Party
7	Damoh	GEN	Dr. Ramakrishna Kusmaria	Bharatiya Janata Party
8	Satna	GEN	Sukhlal Kushwaha	Bahujan Samaj Party
9	Rewa	GEN	Budhsen Patel	Bahujan Samaj Party
10	Sidhi	ST	Tilak Raj Singh	All India Indira Congress
11	Shahdol	ST	Gyan Singh	Bharatiya Janata Party
12	Surguja	ST	Khelsai Singh	Indian National Congress
13	Raigarh	ST	Nand Kumar Sai	Bharatiya Janata Party
14	Janjgir	GEN	Manharan Lal Pandey	Bharatiya Janata Party
15	Bilaspur	SC	Punnulal Mohle	Bharatiya Janata Party
16	Sarangarh	SC	Paras Ram Bhardwaj	Indian National Congress
17	Raipur	GEN	Ramesh Bais	Bharatiya Janata Party
18	Mahasamund	GEN	Pawan Diwan	Indian National Congress
19	Kanker	ST	Chhabila Netam	Indian National Congress
20	Bastar	ST	Mahendra Karma	Independent politician
21	Durg	GEN	Tarachand Sahu	Bharatiya Janata Party
22	Rajnandgaon	GEN	Ashok Sharma	Bharatiya Janata Party
23	Balaghat	GEN	Vishweshar Bhagat	Indian National Congress
24	Mandla	ST	Faggan Singh Kulaste	Bharatiya Janata Party
25	Jabalpur	GEN	Baburao Paranjpe	Bharatiya Janata Party
26	Seoni	GEN	Prahlad Singh Patel	Bharatiya Janata Party
27	Chhindwara	GEN	Alka Nath	Indian National Congress
28	Betul	GEN	Vijay Kumar Khandelwal	Bharatiya Janata Party
29	Hoshangabad	GEN	Sartaj Singh	Bharatiya Janata Party
30	Bhopal	GEN	Sushil Chandra Verma	Bharatiya Janata Party
31	Vidisha	GEN	Shivraj Singh Chouhan	Bharatiya Janata Party
32	Rajgarh	GEN	Lakshman Singh	Indian National Congress
33	Shajapur	SC	Thawar Chand Gehlot	Bharatiya Janata Party
34	Khandwa	GEN	Nand Kumar Singh Chauhan	Bharatiya Janata Party
35	Khargone	GEN	Rameshwar Patidar	Bharatiya Janata Party
36	Dhar	ST	Chhatar Singh Darbar	Bharatiya Janata Party
37	Indore	GEN	Sumitra Mahajan	Bharatiya Janata Party
38	Ujjain	SC	Satyanarayan Jatiya	Bharatiya Janata Party
39	Jhabua	ST	Dileep Singh Bhuria	Indian National Congress
40	Mandsaur	GEN	Dr. Laxminarayan Pandey	Bharatiya Janata Party

=== Maharashtra ===
No.	Constituency	Type	Name of Elected M.P.	Party affiliation
1	Rajapur	GEN	Suresh Prabhakar Prabhu	Shiv Sena
2	Ratnagiri	GEN	Anant Geete	Shiv Sena
3	Kolaba	GEN	A. R. Antulay	Indian National Congress
4	Mumbai South	GEN	Jayawantiben Mehta	Bharatiya Janata Party
5	Mumbai South Central	GEN	Mohan Rawale	Shiv Sena
6	Mumbai North Central	GEN	Narayan Athawalay	Shiv Sena
7	Mumbai North East	GEN	Pramod Mahajan	Bharatiya Janata Party
8	Mumbai North West	GEN	Madhukar Sarpotdar	Shiv Sena
9	Mumbai North	GEN	Ram Naik	Bharatiya Janata Party
10	Thane	GEN	Paranjape Prakash Vishvanath	Shiv Sena
11	Dahanu	ST	Chintaman Navsha Wanaga	Bharatiya Janata Party
12	Nashik	GEN	Rajaram Godse	Shiv Sena
13	Malegaon	ST	Kachru Raut	Bharatiya Janata Party
14	Dhule	ST	Sahebrao Bagul	Bharatiya Janata Party
15	Nandurbar	ST	Manikrao Hodlya Gavit	Indian National Congress
16	Erandol	GEN	Annasaheb M. K. Patil	Bharatiya Janata Party
17	Jalgaon	GEN	Gunawant Sarode	Bharatiya Janata Party
18	Buldhana	SC	Anandrao Vithoba Adsul	Shiv Sena
19	Akola	GEN	Bhausaheb Phundkar	Bharatiya Janata Party
20	Washim	GEN	Pundalikrao Ramji Gawali	Shiv Sena
21	Amravati	GEN	Anant Gudhe	Shiv Sena
22	Ramtek	GEN	Datta Meghe	Indian National Congress
23	Nagpur	GEN	Banwarilal Purohit	Bharatiya Janata Party
24	Bhandara	GEN	Praful Patel	Indian National Congress
25	Chimur	GEN	Namdeo Harbaji Diwathe	Bharatiya Janata Party
26	Chandrapur	GEN	Hansraj Gangaram Ahir	Bharatiya Janata Party
27	Wardha	GEN	Vijay Mude	Bharatiya Janata Party
28	Yavatmal	GEN	Rajabhau Thakre	Bharatiya Janata Party
29	Hingoli	GEN	Shivaji Mane	Shiv Sena
30	Nanded	GEN	Gangadhar Kunturkar	Indian National Congress
31	Parbhani	GEN	Suresh Jadhav	Shiv Sena
32	Jalna	GEN	Uttamsingh Pawar	Bharatiya Janata Party
33	Aurangabad	GEN	Pradeep Jaiswal	Shiv Sena
34	Beed	GEN	Rajani Patil	Bharatiya Janata Party
35	Latur	GEN	Shivraj Patil	Indian National Congress
36	Osmanabad	SC	Shivaji Kamble	Shiv Sena
37	Solapur	GEN	Lingraj Valyal	Bharatiya Janata Party
38	Pandharpur	SC	Sandipan Thorat	Indian National Congress
39	Ahmednagar	GEN	Maruti Shelke	Indian National Congress
40	Kopargaon	GEN	Bhimrao Badade	Bharatiya Janata Party
41	Khed	GEN	Nivrutti Sherkar	Indian National Congress
42	Pune	GEN	Suresh Kalmadi	Indian National Congress
43	Baramati	GEN	Sharad Pawar	Indian National Congress
44	Satara	GEN	Hindurao Naik-Nimbalkar	Shiv Sena
45	Karad	GEN	Prithviraj Chavan	Indian National Congress
46	Sangli	GEN	Madan Patil	Indian National Congress
47	Ichalkaranji	GEN	Kallappa Awade	Indian National Congress
48	Kolhapur	GEN	Udaysingrao Gaikwad	Indian National Congress

=== Manipur ===
No.	Constituency	Type	Name of Elected M.P.	Party affiliation
1	Inner Manipur	GEN	Th. Chaoba Singh	Indian National Congress
2	Outer Manipur	ST	Meijinlung Kamson	Indian National Congress

=== Meghalaya ===
No.	Constituency	Type	Name of Elected M.P.	Party affiliation
1	Shillong	GEN	G.G. Swell	Independent
2	Tura	GEN	Purno Agitok Sangma	Indian National Congress

=== Mizoram ===
No.	Constituency	Type	Name of Elected M.P.	Party affiliation
1	Mizoram	ST	C. Silvera	Independent

=== Nagaland ===
No.	Constituency	Type	Name of Elected M.P.	Party affiliation
1	Nagaland	GEN	Imchalemba	Indian National Congress

=== Odisha ===
No.	Constituency	Type	Name of Elected M.P.	Party affiliation
1	Mayurbhanj	ST	Sushila Tiriya	Indian National Congress
2	Balasore	GEN	Kartik Mohapatra	Indian National Congress
3	Bhadrak	SC	Muralidhar Jena	Indian National Congress
4	Jajpur	SC	Anchal Das	Janata Dal
5	Kendrapara	GEN	Srikanta Kumar Jena	Janata Dal
6	Cuttack	GEN	Anadi Charan Sahu	Indian National Congress
7	Jagatsinghpur	GEN	Ranjib Biswal	Indian National Congress
8	Puri	GEN	Pinaki Misra	Indian National Congress
9	Bhubaneswar	GEN	Soumya Ranjan Patnaik	Indian National Congress
10	Aska	GEN	Biju Patnaik	Janata Dal
11	Berhampur	GEN	P. V. Narasimha Rao	Indian National Congress
12	Koraput	ST	Giridhar Gamang	Indian National Congress
13	Nowrangpur	ST	Khagapati Pradhani	Indian National Congress
14	Kalahandi	GEN	Bhakta Charan Das	Samajwadi Janata Party
15	Phulbani	SC	Mrutyunjaya Nayak	Indian National Congress
16	Bolangir	GEN	Sarat Pattanayak	Indian National Congress
17	Sambalpur	GEN	Krupasindhu Bhoi	Indian National Congress
18	Deogarh	GEN	Sriballav Panigrahi	Indian National Congress
19	Dhenkanal	GEN	Kamakhya Prasad Singh Deo	Indian National Congress
20	Sundargarh	ST	Frida Topno	Indian National Congress
21	Keonjhar	ST	Madhaba Sardar	Indian National Congress

=== Punjab ===
No.	Constituency	Type	Name of Elected M.P.	Party affiliation
1	Gurdaspur	GEN	Sukhbuns Kaur	Indian National Congress
2	Amritsar	GEN	Raghunandan Lal Bhatia	Indian National Congress
3	Tarn Taran	GEN	Major Singh Uboke	Shiromani Akali Dal
4	Jullundur	GEN	Darbara Singh	Shiromani Akali Dal
5	Phillaur	SC	Harbhajan Lakha	Bahujan Samaj Party
6	Hoshiarpur	GEN	Kanshi Ram	Bahujan Samaj Party
7	Ropar	SC	Basant Singh Khalsa	Shiromani Akali Dal
8	Patiala	GEN	Prem Singh Chandumajra	Shiromani Akali Dal
9	Ludhiana	GEN	Amrik Singh Aliwal	Shiromani Akali Dal
10	Sangrur	GEN	Surjit Singh Barnala	Shiromani Akali Dal
11	Bhatinda	SC	Harinder Singh Khalsa	Shiromani Akali Dal
12	Faridkot	GEN	Sukhbir Singh Badal	Shiromani Akali Dal
13	Ferozepur	GEN	Mohan Singh Phalianwala	Bahujan Samaj Party

=== Rajasthan ===
No.	Constituency	Type	Name of Elected M.P.	Party affiliation
1	Ganganagar	SC	Nihalchand Chauhan	Bharatiya Janata Party
2	Bikaner	GEN	Mahendra Singh Bhati	Bharatiya Janata Party
3	Churu	GEN	Narendra Budania	Indian National Congress
4	Jhunjhunu	GEN	Sis Ram Ola	All India Indira Congress
5	Sikar	GEN	Hari Singh	Indian National Congress
6	Jaipur	GEN	Girdhari Lal Bhargava	Bharatiya Janata Party
7	Dausa	GEN	Rajesh Pilot	Indian National Congress
8	Alwar	GEN	Nawal Kishore Sharma	Indian National Congress
9	Bharatpur	GEN	Maharani Divya Singh	Bharatiya Janata Party
10	Bayana	SC	Ganga Ram Koli	Bharatiya Janata Party
11	Sawai Madhopur	ST	Usha Meena	Indian National Congress
12	Ajmer	GEN	Rasa Singh Rawat	Bharatiya Janata Party
13	Tonk	SC	Shyam Lal Bansiwal	Bharatiya Janata Party
14	Kota	GEN	Dau Dayal Joshi	Bharatiya Janata Party
15	Jhalawar	GEN	Vasundhara Raje	Bharatiya Janata Party
16	Banswara	ST	Tarachand Bhagora	Indian National Congress
17	Salumber	ST	Bheru Lal Meena	Indian National Congress
18	Udaipur	GEN	Girija Vyas	Indian National Congress
19	Chittorgarh	GEN	Jaswant Singh	Bharatiya Janata Party
20	Bhilwara	GEN	Subhash Chandra Baheria	Bharatiya Janata Party
21	Pali	GEN	Guman Mal Lodha	Bharatiya Janata Party
22	Jalore	SC	Parsaram Meghwal	Indian National Congress
23	Barmer	GEN	Sona Ram	Indian National Congress
24	Jodhpur	GEN	Ashok Gehlot	Indian National Congress
25	Nagaur	GEN	Nathuram Mirdha	Indian National Congress

=== Sikkim ===
No.	Constituency	Type	Name of Elected M.P.	Party affiliation
1	Sikkim	GEN	Bhim Prasad Dahal	Sikkim Democratic Front

=== Tamil Nadu ===
No.	Constituency	Type	Name of Elected M.P.	Party affiliation
1	Madras North	GEN	N.V.N. Somu	Dravida Munnetra Kazhagam
2	Madras Central	GEN	Murasoli Maran	Dravida Munnetra Kazhagam
3	Madras South	GEN	T. R. Baalu	Dravida Munnetra Kazhagam
4	Sriperumbudur	SC	T. Nagaratnam	Dravida Munnetra Kazhagam
5	Chengalpattu	GEN	Kulasekara Parasuraman	Dravida Munnetra Kazhagam
6	Arakkonam	GEN	A.m. Velu	Tamil Maanila Congress
7	Vellore	GEN	Agaramcheri P. Shanmugam	Dravida Munnetra Kazhagam
8	Tiruppattur	GEN	D. Venugopal	Dravida Munnetra Kazhagam
9	Vandavasi	GEN	L. Balaraman	Tamil Maanila Congress
10	Tindivanam	GEN	Tindivanam G. Venkatraman	Dravida Munnetra Kazhagam
11	Cuddalore	GEN	P.R.S. Venkatesan	Tamil Maanila Congress
12	Chidambaram	SC	V. Ganesan	Dravida Munnetra Kazhagam
13	Dharmapuri	GEN	P. Theertharaman	Tamil Maanila Congress
14	Krishnagiri	GEN	C. Narasimhan	Tamil Maanila Congress
15	Rasipuram	SC	K. Kandasamy	Tamil Maanila Congress
16	Salem	GEN	R. Devadass	Tamil Maanila Congress
17	Tiruchengode	GEN	K.P. Ramalingam	Dravida Munnetra Kazhagam
18	Nilgiris	GEN	S. R. Balasubramaniam	Tamil Maanila Congress
19	Gobichettipalayam	GEN	V.P. Shanmugasundaram	Dravida Munnetra Kazhagam
20	Coimbatore	GEN	M. Ramanathan	Dravida Munnetra Kazhagam
21	Pollachi	SC	V. Kandasamy	Tamil Maanila Congress
22	Palani	GEN	Salarapatty Kuppusamy Kaarvendhan	Tamil Maanila Congress
23	Dindigul	GEN	N.S.V. Chitthan	Tamil Maanila Congress
24	Madurai	GEN	A.G.S. Ram Babu	Tamil Maanila Congress
25	Periyakulam	GEN	R. Gnanagurusamy	Dravida Munnetra Kazhagam
26	Karur	GEN	K. Natrayan	Tamil Maanila Congress
27	Tiruchirappalli	GEN	L. Adaikalaraj	Tamil Maanila Congress
28	Perambalur	SC	A. Raja	Dravida Munnetra Kazhagam
29	Mayiladuthurai	GEN	P.V. Rajendran	Tamil Maanila Congress
30	Nagapattinam	SC	M. Selvarasu	Communist Party of India
31	Thanjavur	GEN	S. S. Palanimanickam	Dravida Munnetra Kazhagam
32	Pudukkottai	GEN	Tiruchi Siva	Dravida Munnetra Kazhagam
33	Sivaganga	GEN	P. Chidambaram	Tamil Maanila Congress
34	Ramanathapuram	GEN	Subramanian Udayappan	Tamil Maanila Congress
35	Sivakasi	GEN	V. Alagirisamy	Communist Party of India
36	Tirunelveli	GEN	D.S.A. Sivaprakasam	Dravida Munnetra Kazhagam
37	Tenkasi	SC	M. Arunachalam	Tamil Maanila Congress
38	Tiruchendur	GEN	R. Dhanuskodi Athithan	Tamil Maanila Congress
39	Nagercoil	GEN	N. Dennis	Tamil Maanila Congress

=== Tripura ===
No.	Constituency	Type	Name of Elected M.P.	Party affiliation
1	Tripura West	GEN	Badal Choudhury	Communist Party of India
2	Tripura East	ST	Baju Ban Riyan	Communist Party of India

=== Uttar Pradesh ===
No.	Constituency	Type	Name of Elected M.P.	Party affiliation
1	Tehri Garhwal	GEN	Manabendra Shah	Bharatiya Janata Party
2	Garhwal	GEN	Satpal Maharaj	All India Indira Congress
3	Almora	GEN	Bachi Singh Rawat	Bharatiya Janata Party
4	Nainital	GEN	Narayan Dutt Tiwari	All India Indira Congress
5	Bijnor	SC	Mangal Ram Premi	Bharatiya Janata Party
6	Amroha	GEN	Pratap Singh Saini	Samajwadi Party
7	Moradabad	GEN	Shafiqur Rahman Barq	Samajwadi Party
8	Rampur	GEN	Begum Noor Bano	Indian National Congress
9	Sambhal	GEN	Dharampal Yadav	Bahujan Samaj Party
10	Budaun	GEN	Saleem Iqbal Shervani	Samajwadi Party
11	Aonla	GEN	Sarvraj Singh	Samajwadi Party
12	Bareilly	GEN	Santosh Gangwar	Bharatiya Janata Party
13	Pilibhit	GEN	Maneka Gandhi	Janata Dal
14	Shahjahanpur	GEN	Ram Murti Singh Verma	Indian National Congress
15	Kheri	GEN	Gendan Lal Kanaujia	Bharatiya Janata Party
16	Shahabad	GEN	Iliyas Azmi	Bahujan Samaj Party
17	Sitapur	GEN	Mukhtar Anis	Samajwadi Party
18	Misrikh	SC	Paragi Lal	Bharatiya Janata Party
19	Hardoi	SC	Jai Prakash	Bharatiya Janata Party
20	Lucknow	GEN	Atal Behari Vajpayee	Bharatiya Janata Party
21	Mohanlalganj	SC	Purnima Verma	Bharatiya Janata Party
22	Unnao	GEN	Devi Bux Singh	Bharatiya Janata Party
23	Rae Bareli	GEN	Ashok Singh	Bharatiya Janata Party
24	Pratapgarh	GEN	Rajkumari Ratna Singh	Indian National Congress
25	Amethi	GEN	Satish Sharma	Indian National Congress
26	Sultanpur	GEN	Devendra Bahadur Roy	Bharatiya Janata Party
27	Akbarpur	SC	Ghanshyam Chandra Kharvar	Bahujan Samaj Party
28	Faizabad	GEN	Vinay Katiyar	Bharatiya Janata Party
29	Bara Banki	SC	Ram Sagar	Samajwadi Party
30	Kaiserganj	GEN	Beni Prasad Verma	Samajwadi Party
31	Bahraich	GEN	Padamsen Chaudhary	Bharatiya Janata Party
32	Balrampur	GEN	Satya Deo Singh	Bharatiya Janata Party
33	Gonda	GEN	Ketki Devi Singh	Bharatiya Janata Party
34	Basti	SC	Shriram Chauhan	Bharatiya Janata Party
35	Domariaganj	GEN	Brij Bhushan Tiwari	Samajwadi Party
36	Khalilabad	GEN	Surendra Yadav	Janata Dal
37	Bansgaon	SC	Subhawati Devi	Samajwadi Party
38	Gorakhpur	GEN	Mahant Avedyanath	Bharatiya Janata Party
39	Maharajganj	GEN	Pankaj Choudhary	Bharatiya Janata Party
40	Padrauna	GEN	Ram Nagina Mishra	Bharatiya Janata Party
41	Deoria	GEN	Prakash Mani Tripathi	Bharatiya Janata Party
42	Salempur	GEN	Harivansh Sahai	Samajwadi Party
43	Ballia	GEN	Chandra Shekhar	Samajwadi Janata Party
44	Ghosi	GEN	Kalpnath Rai	Independent
45	Azamgarh	GEN	Ramakant Yadav	Samajwadi Party
46	Lalganj	SC	Bali Ram	Bahujan Samaj Party
47	Machhlishahr	GEN	Ram Vilas Vedanti	Bharatiya Janata Party
48	Jaunpur	GEN	Rajkeshar Singh	Bharatiya Janata Party
49	Saidpur	SC	Vidyasagar Sonkar	Bharatiya Janata Party
50	Ghazipur	GEN	Manoj Sinha	Bharatiya Janata Party
51	Chandauli	GEN	Ananda Ratna Maurya	Bharatiya Janata Party
52	Varanasi	GEN	Shankar Prasad Jaiswal	Bharatiya Janata Party
53	Robertsganj	SC	Ram Shakal	Bharatiya Janata Party
54	Mirzapur	GEN	Phoolan Devi	Samajwadi Party
55	Phulpur	GEN	Jang Bahadur Singh Patel	Samajwadi Party
56	Allahabad	GEN	Murli Manohar Joshi	Bharatiya Janata Party
57	Chail	SC	Amrit Lal Bharti	Bharatiya Janata Party
58	Fatehpur	GEN	Vishambhar Prasad Nishad	Bahujan Samaj Party
59	Banda	GEN	Ram Sajeevan	Bahujan Samaj Party
60	Hamirpur	GEN	Ganga Charan Rajput	Bharatiya Janata Party
61	Jhansi	GEN	Rajendra Agnihotri	Bharatiya Janata Party
62	Jalaun	SC	Bhanu Pratap Singh Verma	Bharatiya Janata Party
63	Ghatampur	SC	Kamal Rani	Bharatiya Janata Party
64	Bilhaur	GEN	Shyam Bihari Misra	Bharatiya Janata Party
65	Kanpur	GEN	Jagatvir Singh Drona	Bharatiya Janata Party
66	Etawah	GEN	Ram Singh Shakya	Samajwadi Party
67	Kannauj	GEN	Chandra Bhushan Singh	Samajwadi Party
68	Farrukhabad	GEN	Swami Sachidanand Hari Sakshi	Bharatiya Janata Party
69	Mainpuri	GEN	Mulayam Singh Yadav	Samajwadi Party
70	Jalesar	GEN	Ompal Singh Nidar	Bharatiya Janata Party
71	Etah	GEN	Mahadeepak Singh Shakya	Bharatiya Janata Party
72	Firozabad	SC	Prabhu Dayal Katheria	Bharatiya Janata Party
73	Agra	GEN	Bhagwan Shankar Rawat	Bharatiya Janata Party
74	Mathura	GEN	Chaudhary Tejveer Singh	Bharatiya Janata Party
75	Hathras	SC	Kishan Lal Diler	Bharatiya Janata Party
76	Aligarh	GEN	Sheela Gautam	Bharatiya Janata Party
77	Khurja	SC	Ashok Kumar Pradhan	Bharatiya Janata Party
78	Bulandshahr	GEN	Chhatrapal Singh Lodha	Bharatiya Janata Party
79	Hapur	GEN	Ramesh Chand Tomar	Bharatiya Janata Party
80	Meerut	GEN	Amar Pal Singh	Bharatiya Janata Party
81	Baghpat	GEN	Chaudhary Ajit Singh	Rashtriya Lok Dal
82	Muzaffarnagar	GEN	Sohan Veer Singh	Bharatiya Janata Party
83	Kairana	GEN	Chaudhary Munawwar Hasan	Samajwadi Party
84	Saharanpur	GEN	Nakli Singh	Bharatiya Janata Party
85	Hardwar	SC	Harpal Singh Sathi	Bharatiya Janata Party

=== West Bengal ===
No.	Constituency	Type	Name of Elected M.P.	Party affiliation
1	Cooch Behar	SC	Amar Roy Pradhan	All India Forward Bloc
2	Alipurduars	ST	Joachim Baxla	Revolutionary Socialist Party
3	Jalpaiguri	GEN	Jitendra Nath Das	Communist Party of India
4	Darjeeling	GEN	Ratna Bahadur Rai	Communist Party of India
5	Raiganj	GEN	Subrata Mukherjee	Communist Party of India
6	Balurghat	SC	Ranen Barman	Revolutionary Socialist Party
7	Malda	GEN	A. B. A. Ghani Khan Choudhury	Indian National Congress
8	Jangipur	GEN	Mohammad Idris Ali	Indian National Congress
9	Murshidabad	GEN	Syed Masudal Hossain	Communist Party of India
10	Berhampore	GEN	Promothes Mukherjee	Revolutionary Socialist Party
11	Krishnagar	GEN	Ajoy Mukhopadhyay	Communist Party of India
12	Nabadwip	SC	Asim Bala	Communist Party of India
13	Barasat	GEN	Chitta Basu	All India Forward Bloc
14	Basirhat	GEN	Ajay Chakraborty	Communist Party of India
15	Jaynagar	SC	Sanat Kumar Mandal	Revolutionary Socialist Party
16	Mathurapur	SC	Radhika Ranjan Pramanik	Communist Party of India
17	Diamond Harbour	GEN	Samik Lahiri	Communist Party of India
18	Jadavpur	GEN	Krishna Bose	Indian National Congress
19	Barrackpore	GEN	Tarit Baran Topdar	Communist Party of India
20	Dum Dum	GEN	Nirmal Kanti Chatterjee	Communist Party of India
21	Calcutta North West	GEN	Debi Prasad Pal	Indian National Congress
22	Calcutta North East	GEN	Ajit Kumar Panja	Indian National Congress
23	Calcutta South	GEN	Mamata Banerjee	Indian National Congress
24	Howrah	GEN	Priya Ranjan Dasmunsi	Indian National Congress
25	Uluberia	GEN	Hannan Mollah	Communist Party of India
26	Serampore	GEN	Pradip Bhattacharya	Indian National Congress
27	Hooghly	GEN	Rupchand Pal	Communist Party of India
28	Arambagh	GEN	Anil Basu	Communist Party of India
29	Panskura	GEN	Geeta Mukherjee	Communist Party of India
30	Tamluk	GEN	Jayanta Bhattacharya	Indian National Congress
31	Contai	GEN	Sudhir Kumar Giri	Communist Party of India
32	Midnapore	GEN	Indrajit Gupta	Communist Party of India
33	Jhargram	ST	Rupchand Murmu	Communist Party of India
34	Purulia	GEN	Bir Singh Mahato	All India Forward Bloc
35	Bankura	GEN	Basudeb Acharia	Communist Party of India
36	Vishnupur	SC	Sandhya Bauri	Communist Party of India
37	Durgapur	SC	Sunil Khan	Communist Party of India
38	Asansol	GEN	Haradhan Roy	Communist Party of India
39	Burdwan	GEN	Balai Ray	Communist Party of India
40	Katwa	GEN	Mahboob Zahedi	Communist Party of India
41	Bolpur	GEN	Somnath Chatterjee	Communist Party of India
42	Birbhum	SC	Ram Chandra Dome	Communist Party of India

=== Andaman & Nicobar Islands ===
No.	Constituency	Type	Name of Elected M.P.	Party affiliation
1	Andaman and Nicobar Islands	GEN	Manoranjan Bhakta	Indian National Congress

=== Chandigarh ===
No.	Constituency	Type	Name of Elected M.P.	Party affiliation
1	Chandigarh	GEN	Satya Pal Jain	Bharatiya Janata Party

=== Dadra & Nagar Haveli ===
No.	Constituency	Type	Name of Elected M.P.	Party affiliation
1	Dadra & Nagar Haveli	ST	Delkar Mohanbhai Sanjibhai	Bharatiya Janata Party

=== Daman & Diu ===
No.	Constituency	Type	Name of Elected M.P.	Party affiliation
1	Daman and Diu	GEN	Tandel Gopal Kalan	Indian National Congress

=== National Capital Territory of Delhi ===
No.	Constituency	Type	Name of Elected M.P.	Party affiliation
1	New Delhi	GEN	Jagmohan	Bharatiya Janata Party
2	South Delhi	GEN	Sushma Swaraj	Bharatiya Janata Party
3	Outer Delhi	GEN	Krishan Lal Sharma	Bharatiya Janata Party
4	East Delhi	GEN	Lal Bihari Tiwari	Bharatiya Janata Party
5	Chandni Chowk	GEN	Jai Prakash Agarwal	Indian National Congress
6	Delhi Sadar	GEN	Vijay Goel	Bharatiya Janata Party
7	Karol Bagh	SC	Meira Kumar	Indian National Congress

=== Lakshadweep ===
No.	Constituency	Type	Name of Elected M.P.	Party affiliation
1	Lakshadweep	ST	P. M. Sayeed	Indian National Congress

=== Pondicherry ===
No.	Constituency	Type	Name of Elected M.P.	Party affiliation
1	Pondicherry	GEN	M. O. H. Farook	Indian National Congress
