= Nidar (disambiguation) =

Nidar is a Norwegian confectionary company.

Nidar may also refer to:

- Nidar (revolver), Indian-made revolver
- Nidar Singh Nihang, British scholar and martial artist
- Ompal Singh Nidar, Indian politician
