= Krishnapal Singh =

Indian politician

Member of Parliament, Lok Sabha
- In office 1962–1967
- Preceded by: Krishna Chandra
- Succeeded by: Choudhary Multan Singh
- Constituency: Jalesar, Uttar Pradesh

Personal details
- Born: 27 August 1899 Awagarh, Etah district
- Party: Swatantra Party
- Other political affiliations: Hindu Mahasabha; Ram Rajya Parishad; Bhartiya Jana Sangh
- Spouse: Darshan Kumari
- Children: 2 Daughters

Krishnapal Singh was an Indian politician. He was elected to the Lok Sabha, the lower house of the Parliament of India from the Jalesar, Uttar Pradesh as a member of the Swatantra Party.
