= Choudhary Multan Singh =

Indian politician

Member of Parliament, Lok Sabha
- In office 1977-1984
- Succeeded by: Kailash Yadav
- In office 1989-1990
- Preceded by: Kailash Yadav
- Succeeded by: Swami Sureshanand
- Constituency: Jalesar, Uttar Pradesh

Personal details
- Born: 16 June 1915 Januala, Gurgaon District, Punjab, British India
- Died: 23 September 1990 (aged 75)
- Party: Janata Dal
- Other political affiliations: Janata Party
- Spouse: Jai Devi

Choudhary Multan Singh was an Indian politician. He was elected to the Lok Sabha, the lower house of the Parliament of India from the Jalesar, Uttar Pradesh as a member of the Janata Dal.
