= S. Gopalan =

Indian civil Servant

Shri S. Gopalan was former Secretary General of 11th Lok Sabha and 12th Lok Sabha and Lok Sabha Secretariat. He was an Indian civil servant. He started his career as I.A.S (Kerala Cadre) and hold various positions in Government of India.
