= Surendra Mishra =

Indian politician

Shri S.N. Mishra was former Secretary-General of 11th Lok Sabha and Lok Sabha Secretariat, from 15 May 1996 to 15 July 1996 for a short period. Lok Sabha is a Lower House of the Parliament of India.
