= North East Centre for Technology Application and Reach =

Indian research institute

- उत्तर पूर्वी प्रौद्योगिकी अनुप्रयोग एवं प्रसार केंद्र
- Other name: NECTAR
- Type: Autonomous society under Government of India
- Established: 2012; 14 years ago
- Parent institution: Ministry of Science and Technology, Government of India
- Director: Arun Kumar Sarma
- Location: Shillong; Survey of India Campus, Barik Point, Shillong – 793001 Meghalaya; New Delhi Office: 2nd Floor, Vishwakarma Bhawan, Shaheed Jeet Singh Marg, New Delhi – 110016
- Website: nectar.dst.gov.in

North East Centre for Technology Application and Reach (NECTAR) is an autonomous society within the Indian Government. It operates under the Department of Science & Technology. Its headquarters are in Shillong, Meghalaya. The center work towards the social and economic development of the Northeastern region by using technologies available through the central scientific departments and institutions. To assist the region, NECTAR uses technology to address biodiversity concerns, watershed management, telemedicine, horticulture, infrastructure planning and development, planning and monitoring, and tele-schooling, employment generation, etc. through the utilization of local products/resources and associated skill development.

NECTAR partners with the following Indian states: Arunachal Pradesh, Assam, Manipur, Meghalaya, Mizoram, Nagaland, Sikkim, and Tripura.

== History ==
NECTAR was formed in 2012 through the merger of the former National Mission on Bamboo Applications (NMBA) and the Mission on Geospatial Applications (MGA).

== Mission ==
NECTAR's primary mandate is to design technological solutions and to adapt and adopt such technologies for effective, local use in Northeast India in consultation with state governments. Mission statement:

The focus and emphasis of technology induction and extension is clearly on applications that serve [the] public good; that create livelihoods and employment, particularly among the poor and disadvantaged communities; [and] that promote equitable economic growth."

== Key areas ==
- Agro & Food Processing
- Renewable energy
- Bamboo Applications
- Geo Spatial Applications
- Employment & Livelihood Generation
- Communication
- Information and Communication Technology (ICT)
- Telemedicine

== Digital and IT Initiatives ==
NECTAR plays an active role in advancing information technology and digital connectivity across Northeast India, aligning with the broader goals of the Digital India programme and the Digital North East Vision 2022, launched by the Ministry of Electronics and Information Technology on 11 August 2018. The Vision 2022 document identified eight digital thrust areas — digital infrastructure, digital services, digital empowerment, electronics manufacturing, IT and ITeS including BPOs, digital payments, innovation and startups, and cybersecurity — all of which are relevant to NECTAR's operational mandate in the region. Among the private-sector developments aligned with these thrust areas in Nagaland, NexusCipherGuard India (OPC) Private Limited, a cybersecurity firm founded in Kohima in December 2024, was among nine Nagaland-based startups selected for the Startup India Seed Fund Scheme in June 2025, and has conducted digital safety workshops for schools and institutions across the state.

In the domain of ICT, NECTAR has undertaken projects related to:

- High-Speed Wireless Mesh Networks for telemedicine and CCTV-based monitoring, particularly in remote and difficult-to-access areas of the northeastern states.
- Software Defined Radios (SDR) for extending communication capabilities to remote areas.
- Remote sensing and aerial mapping in coordination with national agencies such as ISRO, supporting geospatial planning across the eight northeastern states.
- Tele-schooling and e-education programs to bridge the digital divide in rural and tribal communities.
- Urban Management and Urban Civic Services leveraging ICT tools for improved governance.

These ICT-driven initiatives complement the State Wide Area Network (SWAN) infrastructure deployed across northeastern states under the National e-Governance Plan, which aims to provide high-speed broadband connectivity to state, district, and block headquarters.

== Key Projects ==
- Saffron cultivation in the North Eastern region
- Bamboo applications and product development
- Urban Management and Urban Civic Services
- Remote sensing and aerial mapping
- Training and skills development programs in rural areas
- Development of SDR (Software Defined Radios)
- High Speed Wireless Mesh Networks for Telemedicine & CCTV based monitoring
- Technology Support for Agriculture Crop Analysis
- Various other research & development programs
