= Kailash Yadav =

Indian politician

Member of Parliament, Lok Sabha
- In office 31 December 1984 – 27 November 1989
- Preceded by: Choudhary Multan Singh
- Succeeded by: Choudhary Multan Singh
- Constituency: Jalesar, Uttar Pradesh

Member of Uttar Pradesh Legislative Assembly
- In office 9 June 1980 – 10 March 1985
- Preceded by: Ganga Prasad Verma
- Succeeded by: Atar Singh

Personal details
- Born: Kailash Chandra Yadav; 21 February 1944 Etah, United Provinces, British India (now in Uttar Pradesh, India)
- Party: Indian National Congress
- Education: Lucknow University (B.A., LL.B)

Kailash Yadav was an Indian politician. He was elected to the Lok Sabha, the lower house of the Parliament of India from the Jalesar, Uttar Pradesh constituency of Uttar Pradesh as a member of the Indian National Congress.
