= Krishna Chandra =

Indian politician

Member of Parliament, Lok Sabha
- In office 1952-1962
- Succeeded by: Krishnapal Singh
- Constituency: Jalesar, Uttar Pradesh

Personal details
- Born: 1895
- Party: Indian National Congress

Krishna Chandra was an Indian politician. He was elected to the Lok Sabha, the lower house of the Parliament of India in 1952 from the Jalesar, Uttar Pradesh constituency of Uttar Pradesh as a member of the Indian National Congress.
