= Ompal Singh Nidar =

Indian Politician

Member of Parliament, Lok Sabha
- In office 1996–1998
- Preceded by: Swami Sureshanand
- Succeeded by: S. P. Singh Baghel
- Constituency: Jalesar

Personal details
- Born: 10 June 1950 (age 75) Khushalgarh, Bulandshahr district, Uttar Pradesh
- Party: Bharatiya Janata Party
- Spouse: Saroj Singh (m. 1966)
- Children: 1 son
- Parent: Durga Singh (father)
- Education: Master of Arts; Doctor of Philosophy
- Alma mater: Meerut University; Agra University
- Profession: Teacher, Poet, Politician

Ompal Singh Nidar is an Indian politician from Uttar Pradesh who had represented Jalesar in the Lok Sabha from 1996 to 1998.

== Election result ==
1996 Indian general election: Jalesar
Party	Candidate	Votes	%	±%
BJP	Ompal Singh Nidar	194,422	36.24%	
BSP	S. P. Singh Baghel	1,55,047	28.90%	
SP	Harveer Singh Baghel	81,005	15.10%	
Margin of victory		39,375	7.34%	
Turnout		5,36,395		
BJP hold		Swing		
