= Meijinlung Kamson =

Indian politician (born 1939)

Union Minister of State, Home Affairs
- In office September 1995 – May 1996

Personal details
- Born: 17 January 1939 (age 87) Manipur, India
- Spouse: P. Gaichui (m. 1967)
- Children: 5

Prof. Meijinlung Kamson (born 17 January 1939) is an Indian politician from Majorkhul in District Imphal (Manipur) and a former Union Minister of State for Home Affairs, who held the portfolio in 1995–96.

He was elected four times to 8th, 9th, 10th and 11th Lok Sabha from Outer Manipur (Lok Sabha constituency) in Manipur, India.

== Personal life ==
Born in a Naga family, Kamson has been married to P. Gaichui since 12 May 1967. They have two sons and three daughters.
