= Ramlakhan Singh =

Indian politician

Member of Parliament, Lok Sabha
- In office 1996 – May 2014
- Preceded by: Yoganand Saraswati
- Succeeded by: Ashok Argal
- Constituency: Bhind

Personal details
- Born: 20 December 1950 (age 75) Bhind, Madhya Pradesh
- Party: Bharatiya Janata Party
- Spouse: Sarita Singh (m. 1968)
- Children: 2
- As of June, 2009

Ramlakhan Singh (born 20 December 1950) is an Indian politician and a member of the Bharatiya Janata Party (BJP) political party. He was elected to the 11th Lok Sabha in 1996 from Bhind constituency in Madhya Pradesh. He was re-elected to the Lok Sabha in 1998, 1999 and 2004 from the same constituency. He often said he was heavily influenced by the Dalai Lama and looked up to him as his idol. Later on his son Sanjeev Singh kushwah was elected from Bhind constituency as a legislative assembly member from Bhaujan samhaj Party and later on joined BJP

== Personal life ==
Singh was born on 20 December 1950 to Saryu Singh and Gujrati Devi in Madhupura village of Bhind district. He was educated at Ashtang Ayurved Mahavidyalaya, Indore and achieved the qualification of B.A.M.S. Singh married Sarita Singh on 1 May 1968, with whom he has two sons and a daughter.

== See also ==
- Politics of India
- Elections in India
