= Raja Rangappa Naik =

Indian politician and former Member of Parliament

Member of the Lok Sabha for Raichur
- In office 1996–1998
- Preceded by: A. Venkatesh Naik
- Succeeded by: A. Venkatesh Naik
- Constituency: Raichur

Personal details
- Born: 1959 Karnataka, India
- Died: May 2020 (aged 61)
- Party: Janata Dal
- Occupation: Politician

Raja Rangappa Naik (1959 – May 2020) was an Indian politician from Karnataka who served as a Member of Parliament in the 11th Lok Sabha. He represented the Raichur constituency as a member of the Janata Dal party. Prior to his parliamentary career, Naik was a prominent local government leader in the Gulbarga and Shorapur regions.

== Early political career ==
Naik began his political career at the grassroots local governance level in northern Karnataka. He served as the Pradhan of the Mandal Panchayat for Rukmapur in the Shorapur taluk. His influence in local administration grew when he was elected as a member of the Zilla Panchayat in Gulbarga. During his time on the Zilla Panchayat, Naik served as the Chairman of the Standing Committee for Health and Education, overseeing local public welfare initiatives.

== Lok Sabha (1996–1998) ==
Building on his local government experience, Naik entered national politics during the 1996 Indian general election. He was selected by the Janata Dal to contest the Raichur Lok Sabha constituency, a seat previously held by the Indian National Congress (INC).

In a highly competitive election, Naik secured a significant victory by garnering 214,920 votes. He defeated the incumbent MP, A. Venkatesh Naik of the Indian National Congress, by a margin of over 36,000 votes, and was elected to the 11th Lok Sabha.

His tenure in the Lok Sabha concluded in 1998 following the early dissolution of the 11th Lok Sabha. In the subsequent 1998 general elections, the seat was reclaimed by his political rival, A. Venkatesh Naik.

== Death ==
Raja Rangappa Naik died in May 2020 at the age of 61. His death was mourned by local political leaders across party lines in the Raichur and Shorapur districts.

== Electoral performance ==
Election Results for Raichur Lok Sabha Constituency
Year	Lok Sabha	Party	Votes Secured	Opponent	Opponent Party	Result
1996	11th Lok Sabha	Janata Dal	214,920	A. Venkatesh Naik	INC	Won

== See also ==
- Raichur Lok Sabha constituency
- List of members of the 11th Lok Sabha
- Elections in Karnataka
