= Mukhtar Anis =

Indian politician (1943-2021)

MP Mukhtar Anis
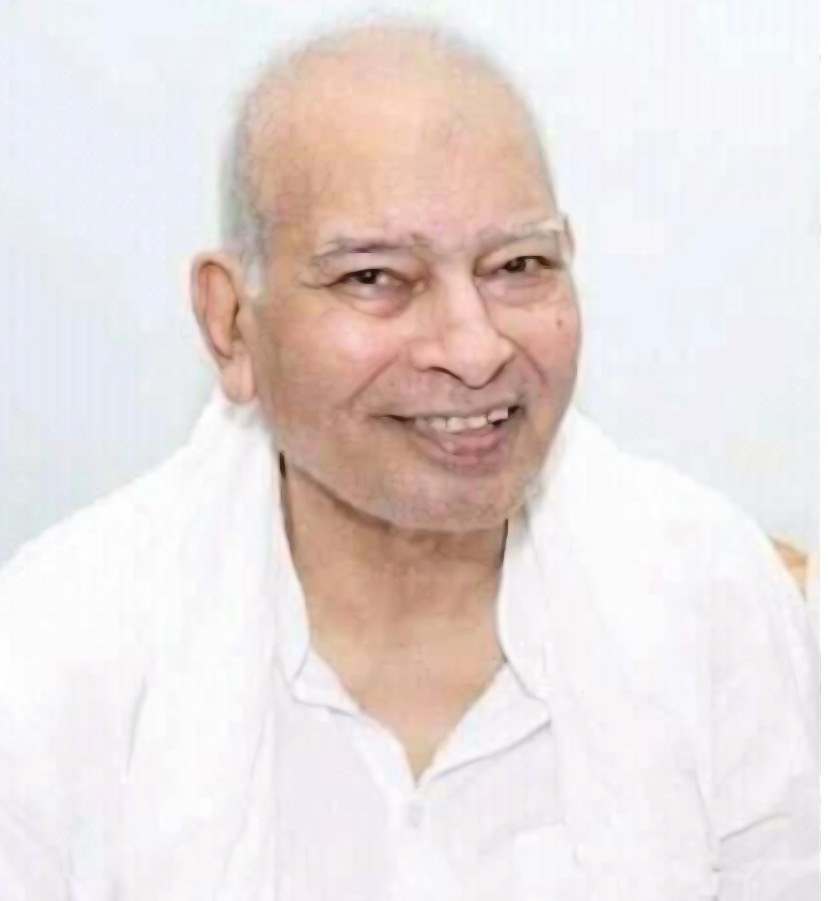

Members of the 11th Lok Sabha
- In office 1996–1998
- Constituency: Sitapur

Member of Uttar Pradesh Legislative Assembly
- In office 1977–1996

Personal details
- Born: 8 June 1943 Tambaur, United Provinces, British India
- Died: 30 March 2021 (aged 77) Lucknow, Uttar Pradesh, India
- Party: Samajwadi Party
- Other political affiliations: Samyukta Socialist Party
- Spouse: Aziz Zahra

Mukhtar Anis (8 June 1943 – 30 March 2021), also spelled Mukhtar Anees, was a former Indian politician and a member of parliament who was elected to 11th Lok Sabha, representing Sitapur parliamentary constituency from 1996 to '98. Prior to participating in general elections, he was a member of Uttar Pradesh Legislative Assembly (1977–96). He was affiliated with Samajwadi Party.

== Biography ==
He was born to Syed Mohd, Anis Rizvi on 8 June 1943 in Sitapur district, Uttar Pradesh.

He started his political career with Samajwadi Yuvjan Sabha, youth wing of Samajwadi Party and was initially nominated as state secretary in 1969. He was later jailed for fourteen months for participating in political movements organised by Samyukta Socialist Party during 1975–77 emergency. He held various positions within the party after he appeared in political or social movements organised by Jayaprakash Narayan.

After releasing from jail, he was elected to Uttar Pradesh Legislative Assembly, and served as deputy minister for Animal Husbandry (1977–78). He was later appointed state minister for Home Guard & Civil Defence (1978–80). He also served as minister for Health & Family Planning and Health Education in 1989. He was last elected to 11th Lok Sabha in 1996. He had disassociated himself from politics a few years before he died.

== Death ==
He was reportedly suffering from neurological disorder. He was admitted to a hospital in Lucknow after his health deteriorated. He died in hospital on 30 March 2021.
