= Sushila Tiriya =

Indian politician and social worker (1956–2026)

Member: Rajya Sabha
- Constituency: Odisha

Personal details
- Born: 6 February 1956 Kaluakhaman, Mayurbhanj district, Orissa, India
- Died: 1 February 2026 (aged 69) Bhubaneswar, Odisha, India
- Party: Congress
- As of 22 November, 2010

Sushila Tiriya (6 February 1956 – 1 February 2026) was an Indian social worker and a politician from the Indian National Congress party, who was a Member of Parliament, representing Odisha in the Rajya Sabha (in 1986, and again in 2006). She was elected to the Lok Sabha, the lower house, in 1994 (10th Lok Sabha) and re-elected in 1996 (11th Lok Sabha).

== Background ==
Tiriya belonged to a family on independence activists. Her father, Shri Rupnarayan Tiriya, opened a school and took keen interest in educating the tribal community.

She graduated from Utkal University with a B.A. degree.

== Political career ==
At the age of 24, Tiriya joined the Youth Congress (I) and became its President and Vice-president in 1983 and 1984 respectively, from Mayurbhanj District, Odisha.

In 1986, she was elected to Rajya Sabha. During her term, she served as Member in the Consultative Committees of Ministry of Science and Technology, Atomic Energy and Ocean Development in 1986–87, Ministry of Civil Aviation in 1987–88, and Ministry of Communications in 1988–89.

From 1987 to 1993, she served as the General Secretary of the Indian Youth Congress. She was a member of the committees on Government Assurances (1988–89) and Welfare of Scheduled Castes and Scheduled Tribes (1989-92).

In 1994, she contested in the tenth Lok Sabha elections for an ST seat and won from Mayurbhanj. During that term, she served as Member of Consultative Committees of Ministry of Science and Technology, Forest and Environment, and Ministry of Food and Civil Supplies, from 1994 to 1996.

From 1995 onwards, she served as the Joint Secretary of All India Congress Committee, along with getting re-elected as a Lok Sabha member in 1996.

== Social work ==
Tiriya had special interests in the upliftment of rural poor tribals as well as the unemployed youth. She was associated with tribal organisations, namely, 'SUGAR'; 'Swayan Vikas Samity' and Rural Youth Tribals Development Association. She also organised two sports events in village Kaluakhaman through tribal association every year to encourage the tribal youth to improve their ability in sports field in Distt. Mayurbhanj.

== Death ==
Tiriya died on 1 February 2026, five days before her 70th birthday.
