= Bhagwan Shankar Rawat =

Indian politician

Member of Parliament, Lok Sabha
- In office 1991–1999
- Preceded by: Ajay Singh
- Succeeded by: Raj Babbar
- Constituency: Agra

Personal details
- Born: 4 December 1940; Rawatpada, Agra (Uttar Pradesh)
- Political party: Bharatiya Janata Party
- Spouse: Shankuntala Rawat (m.1965)
- Children: Three Sons (Brijesh Rawat, Avdesh Rawat, Manoj Rawat) Grandsons= (Anuj Rawat, Aniket Rawat)
- Education: M. A., L. L. B. (Agra University)

Bhagwan Shankar Rawat is an Indian politician who was a member of the Tenth, Eleventh and Twelfth. He began his political career in 1961 when he was elected President of Agra Students Union. In 1968, as a BJS candidate, he was elected as a member of the Agra Municipal Corporation and became the party leader in the house.
