= Harpal Singh Sathi =

Indian politician

Member of parliament
- In office 1996–2004
- Constituency: Haridwar

Personal details
- Party: Bharatiya Janata Party

Harpal Singh Sathi is a leader of Bharatiya Janata Party from Uttarakhand. He served as member of the Lok Sabha representing Haridwar. He was elected to 11th, 12th and 13th Lok Sabha.
