= Swami Sureshanand =

Indian politician (1952–2020)

Member of Parliament, Lok Sabha
- In office 1991–1996
- Preceded by: Choudhary Multan Singh
- Succeeded by: Ompal Singh Nidar
- Constituency: Jalesar, Uttar Pradesh

Personal details
- Born: Suresh Pratap Singh; 20 June 1952 Dehuli, Firozabad district, Uttar Pradesh
- Died: 8 May 2020 (aged 67) New Delhi, Delhi, India
- Party: Bharatiya Janata Party until 2004
- Other political affiliations: Indian National Congress

Swami Sureshanand (1952–2020) was an Indian Member of Parliament. He was elected to the Lok Sabha, the lower house of the Parliament of India from the Jalesar, Uttar Pradesh constituency of Uttar Pradesh as a member of the Bharatiya Janata Party. He died on 8 May 2020.
