= Krishan Lal Sharma =

Indian politician

Krishan Lal Sharma (1 November 1925–1999) was general secretary of Bharatiya Janata Party. He was a member of Lok Sabha from Delhi. He was a member of Rajya Sabha from 1990 to 1996.
