= Rajkeshar Singh =

Indian Politician

Member of Parliament, Lok Sabha
- In office 1996–1998
- Preceded by: Arjun Singh Yadav
- Succeeded by: Parasnath Yadav
- Constituency: Jaunpur
- In office 1977–1980
- Preceded by: Nageshwar Dwivedi
- Succeeded by: Sheo Sharan Verma
- Constituency: Machhlishahr

Personal details
- Born: 29 January 1935 Besahupur, Jaunpur district, United Provinces of Agra and Oudh
- Died: 16 June 2015 (aged 80)
- Party: Bharatiya Janata Party
- Spouse: Prabhawati Devi (m. 1950)
- Children: 3 sons, 2 daughters
- Parent: Dwarika Singh (father)
- Education: Post Graduate
- Alma mater: S.M.S. Vishwavidyalaya, Varanasi; T.N. College, Jaunpur
- Profession: Transporter, Industrialist, Politician

Rajkeshar Singh was an Indian politician from Uttar Pradesh who had represented Jaunpur in the Lok Sabha from 1996 to 1998 and Machhlishahr from 1977 to 1980.
