= Lal Babu Prasad Yadav =

Indian politician

Member of Parliament, Lok Sabha
- In office 1996-1998
- Preceded by: Abdul Ghafoor
- Succeeded by: Abdul Ghafoor
- Constituency: Gopalganj, Bihar

Personal details
- Party: Janata Dal
- Education: Himachal Pradesh University

Lal Babu Prasad Yadav is an Indian politician. He was elected to the Lok Sabha, the lower house of the Parliament of India, from Gopalganj, Bihar, as a member of the Janata Dal.
