= Louis Islary =

Indian politician

Member of Parliament, Lok Sabha
- In office 1996-1998
- Preceded by: Satyendranath Brohmo Choudhury
- Succeeded by: Sansuma Khunggur Bwiswmuthiary
- Constituency: Kokrajhar, Assam

Personal details
- Born: 25 August 1948 (age 78) Bengtal, Kokrajhar district, Assam, India
- Party: Independent
- Spouse: Rabati Islary
- Children: One son and one daughter

Louis Islary is an Indian politician. He was elected to the Lok Sabha, lower house of the Parliament of India from the Kokrajhar constituency of Assam as an independent.
