= Arun Kumar Sarma =

Indian educator

Dr Arun Kumar Sarma
- Education: PhD
- Alma mater: Gauhati University IASST
- Occupation: Director General NECTAR
- Organization: North East Centre for Technology Application and Reach
- Known for: Plasma Physics
- Honours: Indian National Science Academy
- Website: https://nectar.org.in

Arun Kumar Sarma is the Director General at North East Centre for Technology Application and Reach, and a former Professor and Dean at Vellore Institute of Technology.

== Education and career ==
Sarma completed his MSc in Physics from Gauhati University. After completing his undergraduate degree, he received his PhD from the Institute of Advance Study in Science and Technology at Gauhati University. Sarma conducted his post doctoral research at the Institute of Space and Astronautical Science, Japan, and then worked as a scientist at the Centre of Plasma Physics.

He was an assistant professor in the Birla Institute of Technology, Mesra and a professor and dean at Pandit Deendayal Petroleum University. He then became a professor and dean at Vellore Institute of Technology.

== Fellowships ==
He was the recipient of many fellowships, including:

- BOYSCAST DST Government of India
- AAAPT Research Training from Chinese Academy of Sciences
- CoE fellowship from Ministry of Education Culture Sports Science and Technology Japan
- Indian National Science Academy bilateral exchange program
- Indian National Science Academy visiting fellow

== Research ==
Sarma's research interests lie in plasma physics, thin film coating on metal, semiconductors and textiles. He has a few patents and has published many research papers. He has also collaborated with foreign universities from Austria, France, Japan, Nepal, Thailand, and the United Kingdom.
