= Dau Dayal Joshi =

Indian politician (1931–1998)

Dau Dayal Joshi (30 August 1931 – 16 January 1998) was an Indian politician who was member of Lok Sabha from Kota. He was elected to Lok Sabha from Kota in 1989, 1991 and 1996. He was a leader of Bharatiya Janata Party. Joshi was an ayurveda medical practitioner by profession. He was born in Kota in 1931, and studied at Sanskrit Pathshala, Kota and Delhi Vidyapeeth, Delhi. He joined politics and became a member and later Mayor of Kota Municipal Corporation. Ayurveda and Sanskrit language are his special interests. Joshi died in Jaipur, Rajasthan on 16 January 1998, at the age of 66.
