= Jalesar Lok Sabha constituency =

Parliamentary constituency in Uttar Pradesh

Coordinates: 27.47°N 78.30°E

Jalesar
- Former Lok Sabha constituency

Constituency details
- Country: India
- Region: North India
- State: Uttar Pradesh
- Established: 1952
- Abolished: 2008

Jalesar was a Lok Sabha constituency in Uttar Pradesh, India.

== Members of Parliament ==
Election	Name	Party
1952	Krishna Chandra	Indian National Congress
1957	Krishna Chandra	Indian National Congress
1962	Krishnapal Singh	Swatantra Party
1977	Choudhary Multan Singh	Janata Party
1980	Choudhary Multan Singh	Janata Party
1984	Kailash Yadav	Indian National Congress
1989	Choudhary Multan Singh	Janata Dal
1991	Swami Sureshanand	Bharatiya Janata Party
1996	Ompal Singh Nidar	Bharatiya Janata Party
1998	S.P. Singh Baghel	Samajwadi Party
1999	S.P. Singh Baghel	Samajwadi Party
2004	S.P. Singh Baghel	Samajwadi Party
Constituency Demolished in 2008.

== See also ==
- Jalesar
- Awagarh
- List of constituencies of the Lok Sabha
