= List of Union Ministers From Odisha =

List of Ministers from Indian state of Odisha in Union Government

Union Ministers from Odisha have played a significant role in India's national political landscape since independence.This list provides a comprehensive overview of prominent leaders from the state who have held ministerial positions in the Union Government.

== History ==
Nityanand Kanungo, the longest-serving minister from Odisha in the Nehru era, later became the Governor of Gujarat and Bihar. Nandini Satpathy was a rising figure in Indira Gandhi's ministry, becoming a deputy minister at 34 and later the Chief Minister of Odisha during the Emergency. Janaki Ballabh Patnaik rose from deputy to cabinet minister before becoming the Chief Minister of Odisha for nearly 13 years.

A prominent figure in both state and national politics, Biju Patnaik, was a minister in the Morarji Desai and Charan Singh cabinets. He served as the youngest Chief Minister of Odisha in 1961 at age 45 and again in 1990. Other notable national figures include Rabi Ray, who became the Lok Sabha Speaker in 1989, and Srikant Kumar Jena, who held various ministerial roles in different governments. Naveen Patnaik, Biju's son, joined the Vajpayee cabinet before becoming the longest-serving Chief Minister of Odisha for 24 years.

In the Modi govt, Dharmendra Pradhan has become a significant leader, serving as the Union Minister of Education and playing a key role in the BJP's success in Odisha and Haryana. Jual Oram, a six-time MP, has been a Union Minister for Tribal Affairs across multiple governments. Another key figure is Ashwini Vaishnaw, an IAS officer-turned-politician who has held major portfolios like Railways and Information and broadcasting.

== Interim Government of India (02/09/1946 - 15/08/1947) ==
#	Portrait	Name (lifespan) Birthplace	Portfolio	Tenure		Party
Cabinet Minister
1		Sarat Chandra Bose (1889–1950); Cuttack	Works; Mines; Power	2 September 1946	2 September 1946	Indian National Congress

== 1st Ministry of India/ 1st Jawaharlal Nehru Ministry (15/08/1947 - 15/04/1952) ==
#	Portrait	Name (lifespan) Birthplace	Portfolio	Tenure		Party
Cabinet Minister
1		Harekrushna Mahatab (1899–1997); Bhadrak	Industries & Supplies	13 May 1950	26 May 1950	Indian National Congress

== 2nd Ministry of India/ 2nd Jawaharlal Nehru Ministry (15/04/1952 - 17/04/1957) ==
#	Portrait	Name (lifespan) Birthplace	Constituency	Portfolio	Tenure		Party	Lok Sabha (election)
Cabinet Minister
1		V. V. Giri (1894–1980); Berhampur	Lok Sabha MP from Pathapatnam	Labour	15 April 1952	10 September 1954	Indian National Congress	1st (1952)
Minister of State
2		Nityanand Kanungo (1900–1988); Cuttack	Lok Sabha MP from Kendrapara	Consumer Industries in Commerce & Industry	13 June 1956	17 April 1957	Indian National Congress	1st (1952)

== 3rd Ministry of India/ 3rd Jawaharlal Nehru Ministry (17/04/1957 - 02/04/1962) ==
#	Portrait	Name (lifespan) Birthplace	Constituency	Portfolio	Tenure		Party	Lok Sabha (election)
Minister of State
1		Nityanand Kanungo (1900–1988); Cuttack	Lok Sabha MP from Cuttack	Commerce in Commerce & Industry	17 April 1957	2 April 1962	Indian National Congress	2nd (1957)

== 4th Ministry of India/ 4th Jawaharlal Nehru Ministry (02/04/1962 - 27/05/1964) ==
#	Portrait	Name (lifespan) Birthplace	Constituency	Portfolio	Tenure		Party	Lok Sabha (election)
Minister of State
1		Nityanand Kanungo (1900–1988); Cuttack	Lok Sabha MP from Cuttack	Industry in Commerce & Industry	2 April 1962	27 May 1964	Indian National Congress	3rd (1962)

== 1st Gulzarilal Nanda Ministry (27/05/1964 - 09/06/1964) ==
#	Portrait	Name (lifespan) Birthplace	Constituency	Portfolio	Tenure		Party	Lok Sabha (election)
Minister of State
1		Nityanand Kanungo (1900–1988); Cuttack	Lok Sabha MP from Cuttack	Industry in Commerce & Industry	27 May 1964	9 June 1964	Indian National Congress	3rd (1962)

== 5th Ministry of India/ Lal Bahadur Shastri Ministry (09/06/1964 - 11/01/1966) ==
#	Portrait	Name (lifespan) Birthplace	Constituency	Portfolio	Tenure		Party	Lok Sabha (election)
Minister of State
1		Nityanand Kanungo (1900–1988); Cuttack	Lok Sabha MP from Cuttack	Cultural Affairs	9 June 1964	11 January 1966	Indian National Congress	3rd (1962)

== 2nd Gulzarilal Nanda Ministry (11/01/1966 - 24/01/1966) ==
No Ministers from Odisha

== 6th Ministry of India/ 1st Indira Gandhi Ministry (24/01/1966 - 13/03/1967) ==
#	Portrait	Name (lifespan) Birthplace	Constituency	Portfolio	Tenure		Party	Lok Sabha (election)
Minister of State
1		R. Jagannath Rao (1909–1990); Visakhapatnam	Lok Sabha MP from Nowrangpur	Labour, Employment & Rehabilitation	24 January 1966	14 February 1966	Indian National Congress	3rd (1962)
1		R. Jagannath Rao (1909–1990); Visakhapatnam	Lok Sabha MP from Nowrangpur	Parliamentary Affairs; Communications	14 February 1966	13 March 1967	Indian National Congress	3rd (1962)
2		Bibhudhendra Mishra (1928–2012); Puri	Lok Sabha MP from Puri	Industry	24 January 1966	13 March 1967	Indian National Congress	3rd (1962)
Deputy Minister
3		Nandini Satpathy (1931–2006); Cuttack	Rajya Sabha MP from Odisha	Information & Broadcasting	29 January 1966	13 March 1967	Indian National Congress	3rd (1962)

== 7th Ministry of India/ 2nd Indira Gandhi Ministry (13/03/1967 - 18/03/1971) ==
#	Portrait	Name (lifespan) Birthplace	Constituency	Portfolio	Tenure		Party	Lok Sabha (election)
Minister of State
1		R. Jagannath Rao (1909–1990); Visakhapatnam	Lok Sabha MP from Chatrapur	Works, Housing & Urban Development	13 March 1967	14 February 1969	Indian National Congress	4th (1967)
1		R. Jagannath Rao (1909–1990); Visakhapatnam	Lok Sabha MP from Chatrapur	Petroleum; Chemicals; Mines & Metals	14 February 1969	27 June 1970	Indian National Congress	4th (1967)
1		R. Jagannath Rao (1909–1990); Visakhapatnam	Lok Sabha MP from Chatrapur	Law; Social Welfare	27 June 1970	18 March 1971	Indian National Congress	4th (1967)
2		Nandini Satpathy (1931–2006); Cuttack	Rajya Sabha MP from Odisha	Minister without Portfolio	27 June 1970	18 March 1971	Indian National Congress	4th (1967)
Deputy Minister
(2)		Nandini Satpathy (1931–2006); Cuttack	Rajya Sabha MP from Odisha	Information & Broadcasting	13 March 1967	14 February 1969	Indian National Congress	4th (1967)
(2)		Nandini Satpathy (1931–2006); Cuttack	Rajya Sabha MP from Odisha	Minister without Portfolio	14 February 1969	27 June 1970	Indian National Congress	4th (1967)

== 8th Ministry of India/ 3rd Indira Gandhi Ministry (18/03/1971 - 24/03/1977) ==
#	Portrait	Name (lifespan) Birthplace	Constituency	Portfolio	Tenure		Party	Lok Sabha (election)
Minister of State
1		Nandini Satpathy (1931–2006); Cuttack	Rajya Sabha MP from Odisha	Information & Broadcasting	18 March 1971	10 October 1974	Indian National Congress (R)	5th (1971)
2		Janaki Ballabh Patnaik (1927–2015); Puri	Lok Sabha MP from Cuttack	Defence	23 December 1976	24 March 1977	Indian National Congress (R)	5th (1971)
Deputy Minister
3		Chaitanya Prasad Majhi (1929–2019); Bangriposi	Rajya Sabha MP from Odisha	Petroleum and Chemicals	17 October 1974	21 December 1975	Indian National Congress (R)	5th (1971)
3		Chaitanya Prasad Majhi (1929–2019); Bangriposi	Rajya Sabha MP from Odisha	Chemicals and Fertilizers	21 December 1975	24 March 1977	Indian National Congress (R)	5th (1971)
(2)		Janaki Ballabh Patnaik (1927–2015); Puri	Lok Sabha MP from Cuttack	Defence	29 January 1976	23 December 1976	Indian National Congress (R)	5th (1971)

== 9th Ministry of India/ Morarji Desai Ministry (24/03/1977 - 28/07/1979) ==
#	Portrait	Name (lifespan) Birthplace	Constituency	Portfolio	Tenure		Party	Lok Sabha (election)
Cabinet Minister
1		Biju Patnaik (1916–1997); Cuttack	Lok Sabha MP from Kendrapara	Steel; Mines	26 March 1977	15 July 1979	Janata Party	6th (1977)
2		Rabi Ray (1926–2017); Puri	Rajya Sabha MP from Odisha	Education; Social Welfare	24 January 1979	15 July 1979	Janata Party	6th (1977)
Minister of State
3		Samarendra Kundu (1930–1993); Balasore	Lok Sabha MP from Balasore	External Affairs	24 January 1979	28 July 1979	Janata Party	6th (1977)

== 10th Ministry of India/ Chaudhary Charan Singh Ministry (28/07/1979 - 14/01/1980) ==
#	Portrait	Name (lifespan) Birthplace	Constituency	Portfolio	Tenure		Party	Lok Sabha (election)
Cabinet Minister
1		Biju Patnaik (1916–1997); Cuttack	Lok Sabha MP from Kendrapara	Steel; Mines; Coal	26 July 1979	14 January 1980	Janata Party (Secular)	6th (1977)
2		Rabi Ray (1926–2017); Puri	Rajya Sabha MP from Odisha	Health & Family Welfare	26 July 1979	14 January 1980	Janata Party (Secular)	6th (1977)

== 11th Ministry of India/ 4th Indira Gandhi Ministry (14/01/1980 - 31/10/1984) ==
#	Portrait	Name (lifespan) Birthplace	Constituency	Portfolio	Tenure		Party	Lok Sabha (election)
Cabinet Minister
1		Janaki Ballabh Patnaik (1927–2015); Puri	Lok Sabha MP from Cuttack	Tourism; Civil Aviation; Labour	14 January 1980	8 June 1980	Indian National Congress (I)	7th (1980)
Minister of State
2		Ramchandra Rath (born 1945); Aska	Lok Sabha MP from Aska	Chemicals & Fertilizers	2 September 1982	31 October 1984	Indian National Congress (I)	7th (1980)
3		Kamakhya Prasad Singh Deo (born 1941); Calcutta	Lok Sabha MP from Dhenkanal	Defence	29 January 1983	31 October 1984	Indian National Congress (I)	7th (1980)
Deputy Minister
4		Brajamohan Mohanty (1924–1999); Puri	Lok Sabha MP from Puri	Civil Supplies	19 October 1980	15 January 1982	Indian National Congress (I)	7th (1980)
4		Brajamohan Mohanty (1924–1999); Puri	Lok Sabha MP from Puri	Works & Housing	15 January 1982	29 January 1983	Indian National Congress (I)	7th (1980)
(3)		Kamakhya Prasad Singh Deo (born 1941); Calcutta	Lok Sabha MP from Dhenkanal	Defence	15 January 1982	29 January 1983	Indian National Congress (I)	7th (1980)
5		Giridhar Gamang (born 1943); Rayagada	Lok Sabha MP from Koraput	Supply & Rehabilitation	15 January 1982	2 September 1982	Indian National Congress (I)	7th (1980)
5		Giridhar Gamang (born 1943); Rayagada	Lok Sabha MP from Koraput	Labour & Rehabilitation	2 September 1982	29 January 1983	Indian National Congress (I)	7th (1980)

== 12th Ministry of India/ 1st Rajiv Gandhi Ministry (31/10/1984 - 31/12/1984) ==
#	Portrait	Name (lifespan) Birthplace	Constituency	Portfolio	Tenure		Party	Lok Sabha (election)
Minister of State
1		Kamakhya Prasad Singh Deo (born 1941); Calcutta	Lok Sabha MP from Dhenkanal	Defence	31 October 1984	31 December 1984	Indian National Congress (I)	7th (1980)

== 13th Ministry of India/ 2nd Rajiv Gandhi Ministry (31/12/1984 - 02/12/1989) ==
#	Portrait	Name (lifespan) Birthplace	Constituency	Portfolio	Tenure		Party	Lok Sabha (election)
Minister of State (Independent Charges)
1		Giridhar Gamang (born 1943); Rayagada	Lok Sabha MP from Koraput	Communications	4 July 1989	2 December 1989	Indian National Congress	8th (1984)
Minister of State
2		Kamakhya Prasad Singh Deo (born 1941); Calcutta	Lok Sabha MP from Dhenkanal	Culture	31 December 1984	25 September 1985	Indian National Congress	8th (1984)
2		Kamakhya Prasad Singh Deo (born 1941); Calcutta	Lok Sabha MP from Dhenkanal	Personnel & Administrative Reforms in Personnel & Training, Public Grievances & Administrative Reforms	31 December 1984	15 March 1985	Indian National Congress	8th (1984)
2		Kamakhya Prasad Singh Deo (born 1941); Calcutta	Lok Sabha MP from Dhenkanal	Personnel & Training, Public Grievances & Administrative Reforms	15 March 1985	25 September 1985	Indian National Congress	8th (1984)
3		Chintamani Panigrahi (1922–2000); Puri	Lok Sabha MP from Bhubaneswar	Home	22 October 1986	25 June 1988	Indian National Congress	8th (1984)
3		Chintamani Panigrahi (1922–2000); Puri	Lok Sabha MP from Bhubaneswar	Defence Production & Supplies in Defence	25 June 1988	4 July 1989	Indian National Congress	8th (1984)
(1)		Giridhar Gamang (born 1943); Rayagada	Lok Sabha MP from Koraput	Tourism	14 February 1988	25 June 1988	Indian National Congress	8th (1984)
(1)		Giridhar Gamang (born 1943); Rayagada	Lok Sabha MP from Koraput	Communications	25 June 1988	4 July 1989	Indian National Congress	8th (1984)
Deputy Minister
(1)		Giridhar Gamang (born 1943); Rayagada	Lok Sabha MP from Koraput	Welfare	25 September 1985	15 December 1988	Indian National Congress	8th (1984)

== 14th Ministry of India/ V. P. Singh Ministry (02/12/1989 - 10/11/1990) ==
#	Portrait	Name (lifespan) Birthplace	Constituency	Portfolio	Tenure		Party	Alliance	Lok Sabha (election)
Cabinet Minister
1		Nilamani Routray (1920–2004); Balasore	Lok Sabha MP from Puri	Health & Family Welfare	6 December 1989	23 April 1990	Janata Dal	National Front	9th (1989)
1		Nilamani Routray (1920–2004); Balasore	Lok Sabha MP from Puri	Environment & Forests	23 April 1990	10 January 1990	Janata Dal	National Front	9th (1989)
Minister of State (Independent Charges)
2		Srikant Kumar Jena (born 1950); Jajpur	Lok Sabha MP from Cuttack	Small Scale, Argo & Rural Industries of Industry	23 April 1990	10 January 1990	Janata Dal	National Front	9th (1989)
3		Bhajaman Behera (born 1943); Dhenkanal	Lok Sabha MP from Dhenkanal	Petroleum; Chemicals	23 April 1990	10 January 1990	Janata Dal	National Front	9th (1989)
Deputy Minister
4		Bhagey Gobardhan (1934-1993); Jamshedpur	Lok Sabha MP from Mayurbhanj	Programme Implementation	23 April 1990	10 January 1990	Janata Dal	National Front	9th (1989)
5		Bhakta Charan Das (born 1958); Bhawanipatna	Lok Sabha MP from Kalahandi	Women & Child Development in Welfare; Youth Affairs & Sports in Human Resource Development	23 April 1990	10 January 1990	Janata Dal	National Front	9th (1989)

== 15th Ministry of India/ Chandra Shekhar Ministry (10/11/1990 - 21/06/1991) ==
#	Portrait	Name (lifespan) Birthplace	Constituency	Portfolio	Tenure		Party	Alliance	Lok Sabha (election)
Minister of State
1		Bhakta Charan Das (born 1958); Bhawanipatna	Lok Sabha MP from Kalahandi	Railways	21 November 1990	21 June 1990	Samajwadi Janata Party (Rashtriya)	National Front	9th (1989)

== 16th Ministry of India/ P. V. Narasimha Rao Ministry (21/06/1991 - 16/05/1996) ==
#	Portrait	Name (lifespan) Birthplace	Constituency	Portfolio	Tenure		Party	Lok Sabha (election)
Minister of State (Independent Charges)
1		Giridhar Gamang (born 1943); Rayagada	Lok Sabha MP from Koraput	Food Processing Industries	21 June 1991	18 January 1993	Indian National Congress	10th (1991)
1		Giridhar Gamang (born 1943); Rayagada	Lok Sabha MP from Koraput	Planning & Programme Implementation	18 January 1993	15 September 1995	Indian National Congress	10th (1991)
1		Giridhar Gamang (born 1943); Rayagada	Lok Sabha MP from Koraput	Mines	15 September 1995	16 May 1995	Indian National Congress	10th (1991)
2		Kamakhya Prasad Singh Deo (born 1941); Calcutta	Lok Sabha MP from Dhenkanal	Information & Broadcasting	18 January 1993	15 September 1995	Indian National Congress	10th (1991)
2		Kamakhya Prasad Singh Deo (born 1941); Calcutta	Lok Sabha MP from Dhenkanal	Food Processing Industries	15 September 1995	16 May 1995	Indian National Congress	10th (1991)
Minister of State
3		Kahnu Charan Lenka (born 1939); Choudwar, Cuttack	Rajya Sabha MP from Odisha	Agriculture	21 June 1991	18 January 1993	Indian National Congress	10th (1991)
3		Kahnu Charan Lenka (born 1939); Choudwar, Cuttack	Rajya Sabha MP from Odisha	Railways	18 January 1993	2 April 1994	Indian National Congress	10th (1991)
4		Krupasindhu Bhoi (1942–2022); Sambalpur	Lok Sabha MP from Sambalpur	Education in Human Resource Development	15 September 1995	16 May 1996	Indian National Congress	10th (1991)

== 17th Ministry of India/ 1st A. B. Vajpayee Ministry (16/05/1996 - 01/06/1996) ==
No Ministers from Odisha

== 18th Ministry of India/ H. D. Deve Gowda Ministry (01/06/1996 - 21/04/1997) ==
#	Portrait	Name (lifespan) Birthplace	Constituency	Portfolio	Tenure		Party	Alliance	Lok Sabha (election)
Cabinet Minister
1		Srikant Kumar Jena (born 1950); Jajpur	Lok Sabha MP from Kendrapara	Tourism in Civil Aviation & Tourism; Parliamentary Affairs	29 June 1996	21 April 1997	Janata Dal	United Front	11th (1996)
Minister of State (Independent Charges)
2		Dilip Ray (born 1955); Cuttack	Rajya Sabha MP from Odisha	Animal Husbandry and Dairying in Agriculture	29 June 1996	6 July 1996	Janata Dal	United Front	11th (1996)
2		Dilip Ray (born 1955); Cuttack	Rajya Sabha MP from Odisha	Food Processing Industries	6 July 1996	21 April 1997	Janata Dal	United Front	11th (1996)

== 19th Ministry of India/ I. K. Gujral Ministry (21/04/1997 - 19/03/1998) ==
#	Portrait	Name (lifespan) Birthplace	Constituency	Portfolio	Tenure		Party	Alliance	Lok Sabha (election)
Cabinet Minister
1		Srikant Kumar Jena (born 1950); Jajpur	Lok Sabha MP from Kendrapara	Tourism in Civil Aviation & Tourism; Industry	21 April 1997	19 March 1998	Janata Dal	United Front	11th (1996)
Minister of State (Independent Charges)
2		Dilip Ray (born 1955); Cuttack	Rajya Sabha MP from Odisha	Food Processing Industries	21 April 1997	19 March 1998	Janata Dal	United Front	11th (1996)

== 20th Ministry of India/ 2nd A. B. Vajpayee Ministry (19/03/1998 - 13/10/1999) ==
#	Portrait	Name (lifespan) Birthplace	Constituency	Portfolio	Tenure		Party	Alliance	Lok Sabha (election)
Cabinet Minister
1		Naveen Patnaik (born 1946); Cuttack	Lok Sabha MP from Aska	Steel; Mines & Minerals	19 March 1998	13 October 1999	Biju Janata Dal	National Democratic Alliance	12th (1998)
Minister of State (Independent Charges)
2		Dilip Ray (born 1955); Cuttack	Rajya Sabha MP from Odisha	Coal	19 March 1998	13 October 1999	Biju Janata Dal	National Democratic Alliance	12th (1998)
Minister of State
3		Debendra Pradhan (1941–2025); Angul	Lok Sabha MP from Deogarh	Surface Transport	19 March 1998	13 October 1999	Bharatiya Janata Party	National Democratic Alliance	12th (1998)
(2)		Dilip Ray (born 1955); Cuttack	Rajya Sabha MP from Odisha	Parliamentary Affairs	22 May 1998	13 October 1999	Biju Janata Dal	National Democratic Alliance	12th (1998)

== 21st Ministry of India/ 3rd A. B. Vajpayee Ministry (13/10/1999 - 22/05/2004) ==
#	Portrait	Name (lifespan) Birthplace	Constituency	Portfolio	Tenure		Party	Alliance	Lok Sabha (election)
Cabinet Minister
1		Jual Oram (born 1961); Sundargarh	Lok Sabha MP from Sundargarh	Tribal Affairs	13 October 1999	22 May 2004	Bharatiya Janata Party	National Democratic Alliance	13th (1999)
2		Naveen Patnaik (born 1946); Cuttack	Lok Sabha MP from Aska	Mines & Minerals	13 October 1999	4 March 2000	Biju Janata Dal	National Democratic Alliance	13th (1999)
3		Arjun Charan Sethi (1941–2020); Bhadrak	Lok Sabha MP from Bhadrak	Water Resources	27 May 2000	22 May 2004	Biju Janata Dal	National Democratic Alliance	13th (1999)
Minister of State (Independent Charges)
4		Dilip Ray (born 1955); Cuttack	Rajya Sabha MP from Odisha	Steel	13 October 1999	27 May 2000	Biju Janata Dal	National Democratic Alliance	13th (1999)
5		Braja Kishore Tripathy (born 1947); Puri	Lok Sabha MP from Puri	Steel	27 May 2000	22 May 2004	Biju Janata Dal	National Democratic Alliance	13th (1999)
Minister of State
6		Debendra Pradhan (1941–2025); Angul	Lok Sabha MP from Deogarh	Surface Transport	13 October 1999	27 May 2000	Bharatiya Janata Party	National Democratic Alliance	13th (1999)
6		Debendra Pradhan (1941–2025); Angul	Lok Sabha MP from Deogarh	Agriculture	27 May 2000	22 May 2004	Bharatiya Janata Party	National Democratic Alliance	13th (1999)

== 22nd Ministry of India/ 1st Manmohan Singh Ministry (22/05/2004 - 22/05/2009) ==
#	Portrait	Name (lifespan) Birthplace	Constituency	Portfolio	Tenure		Party	Alliance	Lok Sabha (election)
Minister of State
1		Chandra Sekhar Sahu (born 1950); Berhampur	Lok Sabha MP from Berhampur	Labour & Employment	29 January 2006	24 October 2006	Indian National Congress	United Progressive Alliance	14th (2004)
1		Chandra Sekhar Sahu (born 1950); Berhampur	Lok Sabha MP from Berhampur	Rural Development	24 October 2006	22 May 2009	Indian National Congress	United Progressive Alliance	14th (2004)

== 23rd Ministry of India/ 2nd Manmohan Singh Ministry (22/05/2009 - 26/05/2014) ==
#	Portrait	Name (lifespan) Birthplace	Constituency	Portfolio	Tenure		Party	Alliance	Lok Sabha (election)
Minister of State (Independent Charges)
1		Srikant Kumar Jena (born 1950); Jajpur	Lok Sabha MP from Balasore	Statics & Programme Implementation	12 July 2011	26 May 2014	Indian National Congress	United Progressive Alliance	15th (2009)
1		Srikant Kumar Jena (born 1950); Jajpur	Lok Sabha MP from Balasore	Chemicals & Fertilizers	21 March 2013	26 May 2014	Indian National Congress	United Progressive Alliance	15th (2009)
Minister of State
(1)		Srikant Kumar Jena (born 1950); Jajpur	Lok Sabha MP from Balasore	Chemicals & Fertilizers	22 May 2009	21 March 2013	Indian National Congress	United Progressive Alliance	15th (2009)

== 24th Ministry of India/ 1st Narendra Modi Ministry (26/05/2014 - 30/05/2019) ==
#	Portrait	Name (lifespan) Birthplace	Constituency	Portfolio	Tenure		Party	Alliance	Lok Sabha (election)
Cabinet Minister
1		Jual Oram (born 1961); Sundargarh	Lok Sabha MP from Sundargarh	Tribal Affairs	26 May 2014	30 May 2019	Bharatiya Janata Party	National Democratic Alliance	16th (2014)
2		Dharmendra Pradhan (born 1969); Talcher	Rajya Sabha MP from Bihar (until April 2018)	Petroleum & Natural Gas; Skill Development & Entrepreneurship	3 September 2017	30 May 2019	Bharatiya Janata Party	National Democratic Alliance	16th (2014)
2		Dharmendra Pradhan (born 1969); Talcher	Rajya Sabha MP from Madhya Pradesh (from April 2018)	Petroleum & Natural Gas; Skill Development & Entrepreneurship	3 September 2017	30 May 2019	Bharatiya Janata Party	National Democratic Alliance	16th (2014)
Minister of State (Independent Charges)
(2)		Dharmendra Pradhan (born 1969); Talcher	Rajya Sabha MP from Bihar	Petroleum & Natural Gas	26 May 2014	3 September 2017	Bharatiya Janata Party	National Democratic Alliance	16th (2014)

== 25th Ministry of India/ 2nd Narendra Modi Ministry (30/05/2019 - 09/06/2024) ==
#	Portrait	Name (lifespan) Birthplace	Constituency	Portfolio	Tenure		Party	Alliance	Lok Sabha (election)
Cabinet Minister
1		Dharmendra Pradhan (born 1969); Talcher	Rajya Sabha MP from Madhya Pradesh	Petroleum & Natural Gas; Steel	30 May 2019	7 July 2021	Bharatiya Janata Party	National Democratic Alliance	17th (2019)
1		Dharmendra Pradhan (born 1969); Talcher	Rajya Sabha MP from Madhya Pradesh	Education; Skill Development & Entrepreneurship	7 July 2021	9 June 2024	Bharatiya Janata Party	National Democratic Alliance	17th (2019)
2		Ashwini Vaishnav (born 1971); Jodhpur	Rajya Sabha MP from Odisha	Railways; Information & Broadcasting; Communications	7 July 2021	9 June 2024	Bharatiya Janata Party	National Democratic Alliance	17th (2019)
Minister of State
3		Pratap Chandra Sarangi (born 1955); Balasore	Lok Sabha MP from Balasore	Micro, Small & Medium Enterprises; Animal Husbandry, Dairying & Fisheries	30 May 2019	7 July 2021	Bharatiya Janata Party	National Democratic Alliance	17th (2019)
4		Bishweswar Tudu (born 1965); Mayurbhanj	Lok Sabha MP from Mayurbhanj	Tribal Affairs; Jal Shakti	7 July 2021	9 June 2024	Bharatiya Janata Party	National Democratic Alliance	17th (2019)

== 26th Ministry of India/ 3rd Narendra Modi Ministry (09/06/2024 - Incumbent) ==
#	Portrait	Name (lifespan) Birthplace	Constituency	Portfolio	Tenure		Party	Alliance	Lok Sabha (election)
Cabinet Minister
1		Jual Oram (born 1961); Sundargarh	Lok Sabha MP from Sundargarh	Tribal Affairs	9 June 2024	Incumbent	Bharatiya Janata Party	National Democratic Alliance	18th (2024)
2		Dharmendra Pradhan (born 1969); Talcher	Lok Sabha MP from Sambalpur	Education	9 June 2024	August 2026	Bharatiya Janata Party	National Democratic Alliance	18th (2024)
3		Ashwini Vaishnav (born 1971); Jodhpur	Rajya Sabha MP from Odisha	Railways; Information & Broadcasting; Electronics & Information Technology	9 June 2024	Incumbent	Bharatiya Janata Party	National Democratic Alliance	18th (2024)
