= Gokulananda Mohanty =

Indian politician (1899–1974)

Member of Parliament, Lok Sabha
- In office 1962–1967
- Preceded by: Bhagabat Sahu
- Succeeded by: Samarendra Kundu
- Constituency: Balasore, Odisha

Personal details
- Born: Nadbani Village, Basta Tahasil, Balasore district, Odisha, British India; December, 1899
- Died: 4 December 1974 Bhadrak, Odisha
- Party: Indian National Congress
- Spouse: Kanak Devi

Gokulananda Mohanty (1899-1974) was an Indian politician. He was elected to the Lok Sabha, the lower house of the Parliament of India as a member of the Indian National Congress.
