= Kartik Mohapatra =

Indian politician

Member of Parliament, Lok Sabha
- In office 1991–1998
- Preceded by: Samarendra Kundu
- Succeeded by: Kharabela Swain
- Constituency: Balasore, Odisha

Personal details
- Born: Champu, Balasore district, Odisha
- Party: Indian National Congress
- Spouse: Indurani Mohapatra

Kartik Mohapatra (1952-2015) was an Indian politician. He was elected to the Lok Sabha, the lower house of the Parliament of India as a member of the Indian National Congress.
