= List of members of the 5th Lok Sabha =

Members of Lok Sabha (1971-77)

This is a list of members of the 5th Lok Sabha arranged by state or territory represented. These members of the lower house of the Indian Parliament were elected to the 5th Lok Sabha (1971 to 1977) at the 1971 Indian general election.

== Andaman and Nicobar Islands ==
Constituency	Member	Party
Andaman and Nicobar Islands	K. R. Ganesh	Indian National Congress

== Andhra Pradesh ==
Constituency	Member	Party
Adilabad	Poddutoori Ganga Reddy	Indian National Congress
Amalapuram (SC)	Bayya Suryanarayana Murthy	Indian National Congress
Anakapalli	S.R.A.S. Appalanaidu	Indian National Congress (I)
Anantapur (SC)	Ponnapati Antony Reddi	Indian National Congress
Bapatla	P. Ankineedu Prasada Rao	Indian National Congress (I)
Bhadrachalam (ST)	B. Radhabai Ananda Rao	Indian National Congress (I)
Bobbili	K. Narayana Rao	Indian National Congress
Chittoor	P. Narasimha Reddy	Indian National Congress
Cuddapah	Yeddula Eswara Reddy	Communist Party of India
Eluru	Kommareddi Suryanarayana	Indian National Congress
Guntur	Kotha Raghuramaiah	Indian National Congress
Hindupur	Pamudurthi Bayapa Reddy	Indian National Congress (I)
Hyderabad	Dr. Gopal S. Melkote	Telangana Praja Samithi
Kakinada	M.S. Sanjeevi Rao	Indian National Congress (I)
Karimnagar	M. Satyanarayan Rao	Indian National Congress (I)
Khammam	T. Lakshmi Kantamma	Indian National Congress
Kurnool	K. Kodanda Rami Reddy	Indian National Congress
Machilipatnam	Maganti Ankineedu	Indian National Congress (I)
Mahbubnagar (ST)	Janumpally Rameshwar Rao	Indian National Congress
Medak	Indira Gandhi	Indian National Congress (I)
Miryalguda	Bhim Narsinha Reddy	Communist Party of India (Marxist)
Nagarkurnool (SC)	M. Bheeshma Dev	Indian National Congress
Nalgonda	Kancherla Ramkrishna Reddy	Telangana Praja Samiti
Nandyal	Pendekanti Venkatasubbaiah	Indian National Congress (I)
Narasapur (SC)	M.T. Raju	Indian National Congress
Narasaraopet	Maddi Sudarsanam	Indian National Congress
Nellore (SC)	Doddavarapu Kamakshaiah	Indian National Congress (I)
Nizamabad	M. Ram Gopal Reddy	Indian National Congress (I)
Ongole	Puli Venkata Reddy	Indian National Congress (I)
Parvathipuram (ST)	Biddika Satanarayana	Indian National Congress
Peddapalli (SC)	G. Venkatswamy	Indian National Congress
Rajahmundry (ST)	S.B.P. Pattabhi Rama Rao	Indian National Congress (I)
Rajampet	Pothuraju Parthasarthy	Indian National Congress (I)
Secunderabad	M. M. Hashim	Indian National Congress
Srikakulam	Boddepalli Rajagopala Rao	Indian National Congress (I)
Tenali	Meduri Nageswara Rao	Indian National Congress (I)
Tirupathi (SC)	Thamburu Balakrishniah	Indian National Congress
Vijayawada	K. L. Rao	Indian National Congress
Warangal	S.B. Giri	Indian National Congress

== Assam ==
Constituency	Member	Party
Autonomous District (ST)	Biren Sing Engti	Indian National Congress
Barpeta	Fakhruddin Ali Ahmed	Indian National Congress
Cachar (SC)	Jyotsna Chanda	Indian National Congress
Dhubri	Moinul Haque Choudhury	Indian National Congress
Dibrugarh	Robindra Nath Kakoti	Indian National Congress
Gauhati	Dinesh Chandra Goswami	Indian National Congress
Kaliabor	Bedabrata Barua	Indian National Congress
Kaliabor	Tarun Gogoi	Indian National Congress
Karimganj (SC)	Nihar Ranjan Laskar	Indian National Congress (I)
Kokrajhar (ST)	Basumatari, Dharanidhor	Indian National Congress
Lakhimpur	Biswanarayan Shastri	Indian National Congress
Mangaldoi	Dharanidhar Das	Indian National Congress
Nowgong	Liladhar Kotoki	Indian National Congress
Tezpur	Kamala Prasad Agarwala	Indian National Congress

== Bihar ==
Constituency	Member	Party
Araria (SC)	T. Mohan Ram	Indian National Congress
Arrah	Bali Ram Bhagat	Indian National Congress (I)
Aurangabad	Satyendra Narayan Sinha	Indian National Congress (I)
Bagaha (SC)	Bhola Raut	Indian National Congress (I)
Banka	Shiva Chandika Prasad	Indian National Congress
Banka	Madhu Limaye (bypoll)	Socialist Party
Barh	Dharam Bir Sinha	Indian National Congress (Urs)
Begusarai	Shyam Nandan Prasad Mishra	
Bettiah	Kamal Nath Tewari	Indian National Congress
Bhagalpur	Bhagwat Jha Azad	Indian National Congress (I)
Bikramganj	Shiopujan Shastri	Indian National Congress
Buxar	Anant Prasad Sharma	Indian National Congress
Chapra	Ramshekhar Prasad Singh	Indian National Congress
Chatra	Shankar Dyal Singh	Congress
Darbhanga	Binodanand Jha	Indian National Congress
Darbhanga	Lalit Narayan Mishra	Indian National Congress
Dhanbad	Ram Narain Sharma	Indian National Congress
Dhanbad	Shankar Dayal Singh	Indian National Congress (I)
Dumka (ST)	Satya Chandra Besra	Indian National Congress
Gaya (SC)	Ishwar Chaudhary	Jana Sangh
Giridih	Chapalendu Bhattacharyyia	Indian National Congress
Godda	Jagdish Narain Mandal	Indian National Congress
Gopalganj	Dwarka Nath Tiwary	Congress
Hazaribagh	Damodar Pandey	Indian National Congress (I)
Jamshedpur	Sardar Swaran Singh Sokhi	Indian National Congress
Jamui (SC)	Bhola Manjhi	Communist Party of India
Khagaria	Shiva Shankar Prasad Yadava	Samyukta Socialist Party
Khunti (ST)	Niral Enem Horo	
Kishanganj	Jamilur Rahman	Indian National Congress (I)
Lohardaga (ST)	Kartik Oraon	Indian National Congress (I)
Madhepura	Rajendra Prasad Yadav	Indian National Congress
Madhubani	Bhogendra Jha	Communist Party of India
Madhubani	Jagannath Mishra	Indian National Congress
Maharajganj	Sibban Lal Saxena	IND
Monghyr	Deonandan Prasad Yadava	Indian National Congress
Motihari	Bibhuti Mishra	Indian National Congress
Muzaffarpur	Nawal Kishore Sinha	Indian National Congress
Nalanda	Prof. Siddheshwar Prasad	Indian National Congress
Palamau (SC)	Kumari Kamla Kumari	Indian National Congress (I)
Patna	Ramavatar Shastri	Communist Party of India
Purnea	Mohammad Tahir	Indian National Congress
Rajmahal (ST)	Iswar Marandi	Indian National Congress
Rajmahal (ST)	Yogesh Chandra Murmu	Indian National Congress
Ranchi	Prashant Kumar Ghosh	Indian National Congress
Rosera (SC)	Ram Bhagat Paswan	Indian National Congress (I)
Saharsa	Chiranjib Jha	Indian National Congress
Samastipur	Yamuna Prasad Mandal	Indian National Congress
Sasaram (SC)	Jagjivan Ram	
Sheohar	Hari Kishore Singh	
Singhbhum (ST)	Moran Singh Purty	Jharkhand Party
Sitamarhi	Nagendra Prasad Yadav	Indian National Congress
Siwan	Mohammad Yusuf	Indian National Congress

== Chandigarh ==
Constituency	Member	Party
Chandigarh	Amarnath Vidyalankar	Indian National Congress

== Dadra and Nagar Haveli ==
Constituency	Member	Party
Dadra and Nagar Haveli (ST)	Raubhai Ramjibhai Patel	Indian National Congress

== Delhi ==
Constituency	Member	Party
Chandani Chowk	Subhadra Joshi	Indian National Congress
Delhi Sadar	Amar Nath Chawla	Indian National Congress
East Delhi	H. K. L. Bhagat	Indian National Congress (I)
Karol Bagh (SC)	T. Sohan Lal	Indian National Congress
New Delhi	Krishna Chandra Pant	Indian National Congress (I)
New Delhi	Mukul Banerjee	Indian National Congress
Outer Delhi (SC)	Chaudhry Dalip Singh	Indian National Congress
South Delhi	Shashi Bhushan	Indian National Congress

== Goa, Daman and Diu ==
Constituency	Member	Party
Mormugao	Erasmo de Sequeira	United Goans Party
Panjim	Purushottam Shastri Kakodkar	Indian National Congress

== Gujarat ==
Constituency	Member	Party
Ahmedabad	Indulal Kanaiyalal Yagnik	Indian National Congress
Amreli	Dr. Jivraj Narayan Mehta	Indian National Congress
Anand	Pravinsinh Natavarsinh Solanki	Indian National Congress (Organisation)
Banaskantha	Popatlal Mulshanker Bhai Joshi	Indian National Congress
Baroda	Fatesinghrao Pratapsinghrao Gaekwad	Indian National Congress
Bhavnagar	Prasannbhai Mehta	Congress-O
Broach	T.S.Mansinhji Bhasaheb Rana	Indian National Congress
Bulsar (ST)	Nanubhai Nichhabhai Patel	NCO
Dabhoi	Prabhudas Patel	Indian National Congress
Dohad (ST)	Bhaljibhai Ravjibhai Parmar	Indian National Congress (Organisation)
Gandhinagar	Purushottam Ganesh Mavalankar	
Gandhinagar	Somchandbhai Manubhai Solanki	Indian National Congress (Organisation)
Godhra	Piloo Homi Mody	Swatantra Party
Jamnagar	D. P. Jadeja	Indian National Congress (I)
Junagadh	Nanjibhai Ravjibhai Vekaria	Indian National Congress
Kaira	Dharmsinh Dadubhai Desai	Indian National Congress
Kutch	Dr. Mahipatray M. Mehta	Indian National Congress (I)
Mandvi (ST)	Amarsinh Zinabhai Chaudhary	Indian National Congress
Mehsana	Natvarlal Amrutlal Patel	Indian National Congress (Organisation)
Patan (SC)	Khemchandbhai Chavda	
Rajkot	Ghanshyambhai Chhotalal Oza	Indian National Congress
Rajkot	Arvind Mohanlal Patel (1972 bypoll)	Indian National Congress
Sabarkantha	Chandulal Chunnilal Desai	Indian National Congress (Organisation)
Surat	Morarji Desai	Congress-O in 1971, Janata Party only in 1977
Surendranagar	Rasiklal Umedchand Parikh	Indian National Congress

== Haryana ==
Constituency	Member	Party
Ambala (SC)	Ram Prakash Chaudhary	Indian National Congress (I)
Faridabad	Tayyab Hussain Khan	Indian National Congress (I)
Hissar	Mani Ram Godara	Indian National Congress
Kaithal	Gulzarilal Nanda	Indian National Congress
Karnal	Madho Ram Sharma	Indian National Congress
Mahendragarh	Rao Birendra Singh	Vishwa Hindu Parishad
Rohtak	Mukhtiar Singh Malik	Jana Sangh
Sirsa (SC)	Dalbir Singh	Indian National Congress (I)

== Himachal Pradesh ==
Constituency	Member	Party
Hamirpur	Prof. Narain Chand Parashar	Indian National Congress (I)
Kangra	Vikram Chand Mahajan	Indian National Congress (I)
Mandi	Virbhadra Singh	Indian National Congress (I)
Shimla (SC)	Partap Singh	Indian National Congress

== Jammu and Kashmir ==
Constituency	Member	Party
Anantnag	Mohammad Shafi Qureshi	Indian National Congress
Baramullah	Syed Ahmed Aga	Indian National Congress
Jammu	Inder Jit Malhotra	Indian National Congress
Ladakh	Kushok G. Bakula	Indian National Congress
Srinagar	Shamim Ahmed Shamim	Independent
Udhampur	Dr. Karan Singh	Indian National Congress (Urs)

== Karnataka ==
Constituency	Member	Party
Bagalkot	Sanganagouda Basanagouda Patil	Indian National Congress
Kanakapura	C. K. Jaffer Sharief	Indian National Congress
Belgaum	Appaya Kravirappa Kotrashetti	Indian National Congress
Bidar (SC)	Shankar Dev	Indian National Congress
Chikballapur	M. V. Krishnappa	Indian National Congress
Chikkodi (SC)	B. Shankaranand	Indian National Congress (I)
Chitradurga	K. Mallanna	Indian National Congress (I)
Davangere	Kondajji Basappa	Indian National Congress
Dharwad North	Dr. Sarojini Bindurao Mahishi	Indian National Congress
Dharwad South	Fakruddin Husseinsad Mohsin	Indian National Congress (I)
Gulbarga	C. M. Stephen	Indian National Congress (I)
Gulbarga	Sidram Reddy	Indian National Congress
Kolar (SC)	G. Y. Krishnan	Indian National Congress (I)
Koppal	Swami Siddarameshwar Bassayya	Indian National Congress
Mandya	Keragode Chikkalingaiah	Indian National Congress
Mandya	S. M. Krishna	Indian National Congress (I)
Mysore	M.Tulsidas Dasappa	Indian National Congress
Shimoga	T.V. Chandrashekarappa	Indian National Congress (I)
Tumkur	K. Lakkappa	Indian National Congress (I)

== Kerala ==
Constituency	Member	Party
Adoor (SC)	Bhargavi Thankappan	Communist Party of India
Ambalapuzha	K. Balakrishnan	Revolutionary Socialist Party
Badagara	K.P. Unnikrishnan	Indian Congress (Socialist)
Chirayinkil	Vayalar Ravi	Indian National Congress
Ernakulam	Dr. Henry Austin	Indian National Congress
Kasaragod	Kadannappalli Ramachandran	Indian National Congress
Kottayam	Varkey George	Kerala Congress
Kozhikode	Ebrahim Sulaiman Sait	Indian Union Muslim League
Manjeri	M. Muhammad Ismail	Indian Union Muslim League
Mavelikara	R. Balakrishna Pillai	Kerala Congress
Mukundapuram	A.C. George	Indian National Congress
Palghat	A. K. Gopalan	Communist Party of India (Marxist)
Peermade	M.M. Joseph	Kerala Congress
Ponnani	M.K. Krishnan	Communist Party of India (Marxist)
Quilon	N. Sreekantan Nair	Revolutionary Socialist Party
Tellicherry	C.K. Chandrappan	Communist Party of India
Trichur	C. Janardhanan	Communist Party of India
Trivandrum	V.K. Krishna Menon	Independent

== Lakshadweep ==
Constituency	Member	Party
Lakshadweep (ST)	P.M. Sayeed	Indian National Congress

== Madhya Pradesh ==
Constituency	Member	Party
Balaghat	Chintaman Rao Gautam	Indian National Congress
Bastar (ST)	Lambodar Baliar	Independent
Betul	N. K. P. Salve	Indian National Congress
Bhopal	Dr. Shankar Dayal Sharma	Indian National Congress
Damoh	Varah Shanker Giri	Indian National Congress
Dhar (ST)	Bharat Singh Chowhan	Jana Sangh
Durg	Chandulal Chandrakar	Indian National Congress (I)
Guna	Madhavrao Scindia	Bharatiya Jana Sangh
Gwalior	Atal Bihari Vajpayee	Bharatiya Jana Sangh
Hoshangabad	Chaudhary Nitiraj Singh	Indian National Congress
Indore	Prakash Chandra Sethi	Indian National Congress (I)
Indore	Ram Singh Bhai	Indian National Congress
Jabalpur	Seth Govind Das	Indian National Congress
Janjgir	Smt. Minimata Agam Dass Guru	Indian National Congress
Jhabua (ST)	Bhagirath Ramjee Bhanwar	SSP
Kanker (ST)	Arvind Vishram Singh Netam	Indian National Congress (I)
Khandwa	Gangacharan Dixit	Indian National Congress
Khargone	Ram Chandra Bade	Bharatiya Jan Sangh
Mahasamund	Shrikrishna Agrawal	Indian National Congress
Mandla (ST)	Mangru Ganu Uikey	Indian National Congress
Mandsour	Dr. Laxminarayan Pandey	Jana Sangh
Raigarh (ST)	Ummed Singh Rathia	Indian National Congress
Raipur	Vidya Charan Shukla	Indian National Congress
Rajnandgaon	Ramsahai Pandey	Indian National Congress
Rewa	Martand Singh	Indian National Congress (I)
Sagar (SC)	Sahodrabai Murlidhar Rai	Indian National Congress (I)
Seoni	Gargi Shankar Mishra	Indian National Congress (I)
Shahdol (ST)	Dhan Shah Pradhan	Independent
Shajapur (SC)	Jagannath Rao Joshi	Bharatiya Jan Sangh
Sidhi (ST)	Ranabahadur Singh	Independent
Surguja (ST)	Babu Nath Singh	Indian National Congress
Tikamgarh (SC)	Nathu Ram Ahirwar	Indian National Congress
Ujjain (SC)	Phool Chand Verma	Jana Sangh
Vidisha	Ramnath Goenka	Bharatiya Jan Sangh

== Maharashtra ==
Constituency	Member	Party
Ahmednagar	Annasaheb Pandurange Shinde	Indian National Congress
Akola	K.M. Asghar Hussain	Indian National Congress
Amravati	Krishnarao Gulabrao Deshmukh	Indian National Congress
Aurangabad	Manikrao Palodakar	Indian National Congress
Baramati	Raghunath Keshav Khadilkar	Indian National Congress
Bhandara	Vishmbhardas Jwala Prasad Dube	Indian National Congress
Bhir	Sayajirao Trimbakrao Pandit	Indian National Congress
Bhiwandi	Shrikrishna Vaijnath Dhamankar	Indian National Congress
Bombay Central	R. D. Bhandare	Indian National Congress
Bombay Central	Roza Vidyadhar Deshpande	Communist Party of India
Bombay Central South	Abdul Kader Salebhoy	Indian National Congress
Bombay North East	Rajaram Gopal alias Raja Kulkarni	Indian National Congress
Bombay North West	Hari Ramchandra Gokhale	Indian National Congress
Bombay South	Dr. Narain Nirula Kailas	Indian National Congress
Buldhana(SC)	Y S Mahajan	Indian National Congress
Chanda	Abdul Shafee	Indian National Congress
Chimur	Krishnarao Thakur	Indian National Congress
Dahanu (ST)	Laxman Kakadya Dumada	Indian National Congress
Dhulia	Chudaman Ananda Rawandale Patil	Indian National Congress
Hatkanangale	Dattajirao Baburao Kadam	Indian National Congress
Jalgaon	Krishnarao Madhavrao Patil	Indian National Congress
Jalgaon	Yadav Shivram Mahajan	Indian National Congress (I)
Jalna	Baburao Janglu Kale	Indian National Congress
Karad	Premalabai Dajisaheb Chavan	Indian National Congress (I)
Karad	Dajisaheb Chavan	Indian National Congress
Khamgaon (SC)	Arjun Shripat Kasture	Indian National Congress
Khed	Anantrao Patil	Indian National Congress
Kolaba	Shankar Rao B. Savant	Indian National Congress
Kolhapur	Rajaram Dadasaheb Nimbalkar	Indian National Congress
Kopargaon	Balasaheb Vikhe Patil	Indian National Congress
Latur	Tulsiram Dashrath Kamble	Indian National Congress
Malegaon (ST)	Zambru Mangalu Kahandole	Indian National Congress
Nagpur	Jambuwant Bapurao Dhote	Forward Block, with Jana Sangh support
Nanded	Venkatarao Babarao Tarodekar	Indian National Congress
Nandurbar (ST)	Tukaram Huraji Gavit	Indian National Congress
Nashik	Bhanudas Ramchandra Kavade	Indian National Congress
Osmanabad (SC)	Tulsiram Abaji Patil	Indian National Congress
Pandharpur (SC)	Nivruti Satwaji Kamble	Republican Party of India
Parbhani	Shivajirao Shankarrao Deshmukh	Indian National Congress
Pune	Mohan Manikchand Dharia	Indian National Congress
Rajapur	Prof. Madhu Dandavate	Socialist Party
Ramtek	Dr. Amrut Ganpat Sonar	Indian National Congress
Ramtek	Ram Hedaoo	Independent
Ratnagiri	Shantaram Laxman Peje	Indian National Congress
Sangli	Ganpati Tukaram Gotkhinde	Indian National Congress
Satara	Yashwantrao Balwantrao Chavan	Indian National Congress (Urs)
Solapur	Surajratan Fatehchand Damani	Indian National Congress
Wardha	Jagjivanrao Ganpatrao Kadam	Indian National Congress
Yavatmal	Sadashivarao Bapuji Thakre	Indian National Congress

== Manipur ==
Constituency	Member	Party
Inner Manipur	Prof. N. Tombi Singh	Indian National Congress (I)
Outer Manipur (ST)	Paokai Haokip	Indian National Congress

== Meghalaya ==
Constituency	Member	Party
Shillong	Gilbert G. Swell	Independent
Tura	K.R. Marak	All Party Hill Leaders' Conference

== Mizoram ==
Constituency	Member	Party
Mizoram (ST)	Sangliana	Independent

== Mysore State ==
Constituency	Member	Party
Bangalore City	K. Hanumanthaiya	Indian National Congress
Bellary	Dr. V.K.R. Varadaraja Rao	Indian National Congress
Bijapur	Choudari Bhimappa Ellappa	Indian National Congress
Chamarajanagar (SC)	S.M. Siddaiah	Indian National Congress
Gulbarga	Dharamao Sharanappa Afzalpurkar	Indian National Congress
Hassan	Nuggehalli Shivappa	Indian National Congress
Kanara	Balakrishna Venkanna Naik	Indian National Congress
Mangalore	K.K. Shetty	Indian National Congress
Raichur	Pampan Gowda Sakreppa Gowda	Indian National Congress
Udupi	P. Ranganath Shenoy	Indian National Congress

== Nagaland ==
Constituency	Member	Party
Nagaland	Kevichüsa Angami	Independent

== Odisha ==
INC (13) Utkal (3) SWAP (2) CPI (1) IND (1)

Sl. No.	Constituency	Member	Colour	Party
1	Anugul	Badakumar Pratap Gangadeb		Indian National Congress
2	Baleswar	Syama Sundar Mahapatra		Indian National Congress
3	Berhampur	R. Jagannatha Rao		Indian National Congress
4	Bhadrak (SC)	Arjun Charan Sethi		Indian National Congress
5	Bhanjanagar	Duti Krushna Panda		Communist Party of India
6	Bhubaneswar	Chintamani Panigrahi		Indian National Congress
7	Bolangir	Raj Raj Singh Deo		Swatantra Party
8	Cuttack	Janaki Ballabh Patnaik		Indian National Congress
9	Dhenkanal	Devendra Satpathy		Indian National Congress
10	Jajapur (SC)	Anadi Charan Das		Utkal Congress
11	Kalahandi	Pratap Keshari Deo		Independent politician
12	Kendrapara	Surendra Mohanty		Utkal Congress
13	Keonjhar (ST)	Kumar Majhi		Indian National Congress
14	Koraput (ST)	Bhagirathi Gomango		Indian National Congress
14	Koraput (ST)	Giridhari Gamang(1972 bypoll)		Indian National Congress
15	Mayurbhanj (ST)	Man Mohan Tudu		Indian National Congress
15	Mayurbhanj (ST)	Chandra Mohan Sinha		Utkal Congress (1972 bypoll)
16	Nabarangapur (ST)	Khagapati Pradhani		Indian National Congress
17	Phulbani (SC)	Baksi Nayak		Swatantra Party
18	Puri	Banamali Patnaik		Indian National Congress
19	Sambalpur	Banamali Babu		Indian National Congress
20	Sundargarh (ST)	Gajadhar Majhi		Indian National Congress

== Puducherry ==
Constituency	Member	Party
Pondicherry	Aravinda Bala Pajanor	All India Anna Dravida Munnetra Kazhagam
Pondicherry	Mohan Kumaramangalam	Indian National Congress

== Punjab ==
Constituency	Member	Party
Amritsar	Durgadas Bhatia	Indian National Congress
Amritsar	Raghunandan Lal Bhatia	Indian National Congress
Bhatinda (SC)	Bhan Singh Bhaura	Communist Party of India
Fazilka	Gurdas Singh Badal	Akali Dal
Ferozepur	Dr. Gurdial Singh Dhillon	Indian National Congress (I)
Ferozepur	Sardar Mohinder Singh Gill	Indian National Congress
Gurdaspur	Prabodh Chandra	Indian National Congress
Hoshiarpur	Darbara Singh	Indian National Congress
Jullundur	Sardar Swaran Singh	Indian National Congress
Ludhiana	Devinder Singh Garcha	Indian National Congress (I)
Patiala	Sat Pal Kapur	Indian National Congress
Phillaur (SC)	Chaudhary Sadhu Ram	Indian National Congress
Sangrur	Teja Singh Swatantra	Communist Party of India

== Rajasthan ==
Constituency	Member	Party
Ajmer	Bashweshwar Nath Bhargava	Indian National Congress
Alwar	Dr. Hari Prasad Sharma	Indian National Congress
Alwar	Nawal Kishore Sharma	Indian National Congress
Banswara (ST)	Hira Lal Doda	Indian National Congress
Bayana (SC)	Jagannath Pahadia	Indian National Congress (I)
Bharatpur	Raj Bahadur	Indian National Congress
Bhilwara	Hemendra Singh Banera	Jana Sangh
Bikaner	Karni Singh	Independent
Chittorgarh	Bishwanath Jhunjhunwala	Bharatiya Jan Sangh
Ganganagar (SC)	Pannalal Barupal	Indian National Congress
Jaipur	Rajmata of Jaipur Gayatri Devi	Swatantra Party
Jalore (SC)	Narendra Kumar Sanghi	Indian National Congress
Jalore (SC)	Sardar Buta Singh	Indian National Congress
Jhalawar	Brijraj Singh	Bharatiya Jan Sangh
Jhunjhunu	Shivnath Singh Gill	Indian National Congress
Jodhpur	Rajmata(Jodhpur) Krishna Kumari	Independent
Kota	Onkarlal Berwa	Bharatiya Jan Sangh
Nagaur	Nathu Ram Mirdha	Indian National Congress
Pali	Mool Chand Daga	Indian National Congress (I)
Sawai Madhopur (ST)	Chhutten Lal	Indian National Congress
Sikar	Shrikrishan Modi	Indian National Congress
Tonk (SC)	Ram Kanwar Bairwa	Swatantra Party

== Sikkim ==
Constituency	Member	Party
Sikkim	S.K. Rai	Indian National Congress

== Tamil Nadu ==
Constituency	Member	Party
Arakkonam	O.V. Alagesan Mudaliar	Indian National Congress
Chengleput	C. Chitti Babu	Dravida Munnetra Kazhagam
Chennai Central	Murasoli Maran	Dravida Munnetra Kazhagam
Chidambaram (SC)	V. Mayavan	Dravida Munnetra Kazhagam
Coimbatore	K. Baladhandayutham	Communist Party of India
Coimbatore	Parvathi Krishnan	Communist Party of India
Cuddalore	Irruppu Govindaswamy Bhuvarahan	Indian National Congress
Cuddalore	S. Radhakrishnan	Indian National Congress
Dharapuram	C.T. Dhandapani	Dravida Munnetra Kazhagam
Dindigul	K. Mayathever	Dravida Munnetra Kazhagam
Dindigul	M. Rajangam	Dravida Munnetra Kazhagam
Gobichettipalayam	P.A. Swamynathan	Dravida Munnetra Kazhagam
Kallakurichi	M. Deiveekan	Dravida Munnetra Kazhagam
Karur	K. Gopal	Indian National Congress
Krishnagiri	T. Thirthagiri Gounder	Indian National Congress
Kumbakonam	Era Sezhiyan	Dravida Munnetra Kazhagam
Madras North	Krishnan Manoharan	Dravida Munnetra Kazhagam
Mayuram (SC)	K. Subravelu	Dravida Munnetra Kazhagam
Nagapattinam (SC)	M. Kathamuthu	Communist Party of India
Nagercoil	K. Kamaraj Nadar	Indian National Congress (Organisation)
Nilgiris	J. Matha Gowder	Dravida Munnetra Kazhagam
Palani	C. Subramaniam	Indian National Congress
Perambalur (SC)	A. Durairasu	Dravida Munnetra Kazhagam
Periyakulam	S.M. Muhammed Sheriff	Indian Union Muslim League
Pollachi (SC)	A.M.R. Mohanraj Kalingarayar	Dravida Munnetra Kazhagam
Pudukkottai	K. Veeriah	Dravida Munnetra Kazhagam
Ramanathapuram	P.K.Mookkiah Thevar	All India Forward Bloc
Salem	E.R. Krishnan	Dravida Munnetra Kazhagam
Sivaganga	R.V. Swaminathan	Indian National Congress (I)
Sivaganga	T. Kiruttinan	Dravida Munnetra Kazhagam
Sivakasi	Venkatasamy Jeyalakshmi	Indian National Congress
Sriperumbudur (SC)	T.S. Lakshmanan	Dravida Munnetra Kazhagam
Tenkasi (SC)	A.M. Chellachami	Indian National Congress
Thanjavur	S.D. Somasundaram	All India Anna Dravida Munnetra Kazhagam
Tindivanam	M.R. Lakshminarayanan	Indian National Congress
Tiruchendur	M.S. Sivasamy	Dravida Munnetra Kazhagam
Tiruchirappalli	M. Kalyanasundaram	Communist Party of India
Tirunelveli	S.A. Muruganantham	Communist Party of India
Tirupattur	C.K. Chinnaraje Gounder	Dravida Munnetra Kazhagam
Trichengode	M. Muthuswamy	Dravida Munnetra Kazhagam
Vellore	R.P. Ulaganambi	Dravida Munnetra Kazhagam
Wandiwash	G. Viswanathan	Dravida Munnetra Kazhagam

== Tripura ==
Constituency	Member	Party
Tripura East (ST)	Dasarath Deb	Communist Party of India (Marxist)
Tripura West	Birendra Chandra Dutta	Communist Party of India (Marxist)

== Uttar Pradesh ==
Constituency	Member	Party
Agra	Seth Achal Singh	Indian National Congress
Akbarpur (SC)	Ramji Ram	Indian National Congress
Aligarh	Shiv Kumar Shastri	Bharatiya Kranti Dal
Allahabad	Hemwati Nandan Bahuguna	Congress
Almora	Narendra Singh Bisht	Indian National Congress
Amethi	Vidya Dhar Bajpai	Indian National Congress
Amroha	Maulana Ishaq Sambhali	Communist Party of India
Aonla	Smt. Savitri Shyam	Indian National Congress
Azamgarh	Chandrajit Yadav	Congress
Baghpat	Ram Chandra Vikal	Indian National Congress
Bahraich	Badlu Ram Shukla	Indian National Congress
Ballia	Chandrika Prasad	Indian National Congress
Balrampur	Chandra Bhal Mani Tiwari	Indian National Congress (I)
Banda	Ram Ratan Sharma	Bharatiya Jan Sangh
Bansgaon (SC)	Ram Surat Prasad	Indian National Congress
Barabanki (SC)	Rudra Pratap Singh	Indian National Congress
Bareilly	Satish Chandra	Indian National Congress
Basti (SC)	Anand Prasad Dhusia	Indian National Congress
Bijnor (SC)	Ram Dayal	Indian National Congress
Bijnor (SC)	Swami Ramanand Shastri	Indian National Congress
Bilhaur	Sushila Rohatgi	Indian National Congress
Budaun	Karan Singh Yadav	Indian National Congress
Bulandshahar	Surendra Pal Singh	Indian National Congress (I)
Chandauli	Sudhakar Pandey	Indian National Congress
Dehradun	Mulki Raj Saini	Indian National Congress
Deoria	Bishwanath Roy	Indian National Congress
Domariaganj	Keshav Dev Malviya	Indian National Congress
Etah	Rohanlal Chaturvedi	Indian National Congress
Etawah	Sri Shanker Tewari	Indian National Congress
Faizabad	Ram Krishna Sinha	Indian National Congress
Farrukhabad	Awadhesh Chandra Singh Rathore	Indian National Congress
Fatehpur	Sant Bux Singh	Indian National Congress
Phulpur	Vishwanath Pratap Singh	Congress
Firozabad (SC)	Chhatrapati Ambesh	Indian National Congress
Garhwal	Hemwati Nandan Bahuguna	Congress
Garhwal	Pratap Singh Negi	Indian National Congress
Ghatampur (SC)	Tula Ram	Indian National Congress
Ghazipur	Sarjoo Pandey	Communist Party of India
Ghosi	Jharkhande Rai	Communist Party of India
Gonda	Anand Singh	Indian National Congress (I)
Gorakhpur	Narsingh Narain Pandey	Indian National Congress
Hamirpur	Swami Brahmanand	Indian National Congress
Hapur	Buddha Priya Maurya	Indian National Congress
Hapur	Kedar Nath Singh	Indian National Congress (I)
Hardoi (SC)	Kinder Lal	Indian National Congress (I)
Hardwar (SC)	Sunder Lal	Indian National Congress (I)
Hathras (SC)	Chandra Pal Shailani	Congress
Jalaun (SC)	Chowdhary Ram Sewak	Indian National Congress
Jaunpur	Rajdeo Singh	Indian National Congress
Jhansi	Dr. Govind Dass Richhariya	Indian National Congress
Kairana	Shafquat Jung	Indian National Congress
Kaiserganj	Shakuntala Nayar	Bharatiya Jan Sangh
Kannauj	S.N. Mishra	Indian National Congress
Kanpur	S. M. Banerjee	Independent
Khalilabad	Krishna Chandra Pandey	Indian National Congress (I)
Kheri	Balgovind Verma	Indian National Congress
Khurja (SC)	Hari Singh	Indian National Congress
Lalganj (SC)	Ram Dhan	
Lucknow	Sheila Kaul	Congress
Machhlishahr	Nageshwar Dwivedi	Indian National Congress
Maharajganj	Shibbanlal Saksena	IND
Mainpuri	Maharaj Singh	Indian National Congress
Mathura	Chakleshwar Singh	Indian National Congress
Meerut	Shah Nawaz Khan (general)	Indian National Congress
Mirzapur	Aziz Imam	Indian National Congress (I)
Misrikh (SC)	Dr. Sankta Prasad	Indian National Congress (I)
Mohanlalganj (SC)	Ganga Devi	Indian National Congress
Moradabad	Virendra Agarwala	Bharatiya Jan Sangh
Muzaffarnagar	Vijai Pal Singh	Communist Party of India
Padrauna	Genda Singh	Indian National Congress
Pilibhit	Mohan Swarup	Indian National Congress
Pratapgarh	Dinesh Singh	Indian National Congress (I)
Raebareli	Indira Nehru Gandhi	Indian National Congress
Rampur	Zulfiquar Ali Khan	Indian National Congress (I)
Ramsanehighat (SC)	Baijnath Kureel	Indian National Congress
Robertsganj (SC)	Ram Swarup	Indian National Congress
Saidpur (SC)	Shambhu Nath	Indian National Congress
Salempur	Tarkeshwar Pande	Indian National Congress
Shahabad	Dharam Gaj Singh	Indian National Congress (I)
Shahjahanpur (SC)	Jitendra Prasada	Indian National Congress
Sitapur	Jagdish Chandra Dikshit	Indian National Congress
Tehri Garhwal	Paripoornanand Painuli	Indian National Congress
Unnao	Ziaur Rahman Ansari	Indian National Congress (I)
Varanasi	Prof. Raja Ram Shastri	Indian National Congress

== West Bengal ==
Constituency	Member	Party
Arambagh	Manoranjan Hazra	Communist Party of India (Marxist)
Asansol	Robin Sen	Communist Party of India (Marxist)
Azambagh	Bijoy Krishna Modak	Communist Party of India (Marxist)
Balurghat (SC)	Rasendra Nath Barman	Indian National Congress
Bankura	Shankar Narayan Singh Deo	Indian National Congress
Barasat	Dr. Ranenendra Nath Sen	Communist Party of India
Barrackpore	Mohammed Ismail	Communist Party of India (Marxist)
Basirhat	A.K.M. Ishaque	Indian National Congress
Berhampore	Tridib Chaudhuri	Revolutionary Socialist Party
Birbhum (SC)	Gadadhar Saha	Communist Party of India (Marxist)
Bolpur (SC)	Somnath Chatterjee	
Bolpur	Dr. Saradish Roy	Communist Party of India (Marxist)
Calcutta North East	Hirendranath Mukherjee	Communist Party of India
Calcutta North West	Ashok Kumar Sen	Indian National Congress (I)
Contai	Prof. Samar Guha	
Cooch Behar (SC)	Benoy Krishna Daschowdhury	Indian National Congress
Darjeeling	Rattanlal Brahman	Communist Party of India (Marxist)
Diamond Harbour	Jyotirmoy Bosu	Communist Party of India (Marxist)
Durgapur (SC)	Krishna Chandra Halder	Communist Party of India (Marxist)
Ghatal	Jagadish Bhattacharyya	Communist Party of India (Marxist)
Howrah	Samar Mukherjee	Communist Party of India (Marxist)
Jalpaiguri	Tuna Oraon	Indian National Congress
Jangipur	Haji Lutfal Haque	Indian National Congress
Jaynagar (SC)	Sakti Kumar Sarkar	
Jhargram (ST)	Prof. Amiya Kumar Kisku	Indian National Congress
Katwa	Saroj Mukherjee	Communist Party of India (Marxist)
Krishnagar	Renu Pada Das	Communist Party of India (Marxist)
Malda	Dinesh Chandra Joarder	Communist Party of India (Marxist)
Mathurapur (SC)	Madhuryya Haldar	Communist Party of India (Marxist)
Midnapore	Subodh Chandra Hansda	Indian National Congress
Midnapore	Indrajit Gupta	Communist Party of India
Murshidabad	Abu Taleb Chowdhury	Independent
Murshidabad	Muhammed Khuda Bukhsh	Indian National Congress
Nabadwip (SC)	Bibha Ghosh Goswami	Communist Party of India (Marxist)
Purulia	Debendra Nath Mahata	Indian National Congress
Raiganj	Maya Ray	Indian National Congress
Raiganj	Siddhartha Shankar Ray	Indian National Congress
Raiganj	Priya Ranjan Dasmunsi	Indian National Congress
Serampore	Dinendra Nath Bhattacharya	Communist Party of India (Marxist)
Tamluk	Satish Chandra Samanta	Bangla Congress
Uluberia	Shyamaprasanna Bhattacharyya	Communist Party of India (Marxist)
Vishnupur (SC)	Ajit Kumar Saha	Communist Party of India (Marxist)

== Nominated ==
Constituency	Member	Party
North-East Frontier Agency	Chow Chandret Gohain	Indian National Congress
Anglo-Indian reserved seats in the Lok Sabha	Frank Anthony	Independent
Anglo-Indian reserved seats in the Lok Sabha	A. E. T. Barrow	Independent
