= M. M. Hashim =

Indian politician (1921-2013)

MP M. M. Hashim

Member of Andhra Pradesh Rajya Sabha
- In office 1990–1996

Home Minister of United Andhra Pradesh
- In office 1989–1990

Member of 6th Lok Sabha
- In office 1977–1980
- Constituency: Secunderabad

Member of 5th Lok Sabha
- In office 1971–1977
- Constituency: Secunderabad

Member of Andhra Pradesh Legislative Assembly
- In office 1967–1971
- In office 1962–1967

Personal details
- Born: 19 October 1921 Hyderabad, India
- Died: 22 December 2013 (aged 92) Washington D. C., US
- Party: Indian National Congress
- Other political affiliations: Telangana Praja Samithi
- Spouse: Khursheed
- Children: 6

Mirza Mohammed Hashim (19 October 1921 – 22 December 2013), commonly known as M. M. Hashim, was an Indian politician, member of parliament and a former home minister of United Andhra Pradesh. He represented the Secunderabad parliamentary constituency in 5th Lok Sabha from 1971 to 77 and 6th Lok Sabha from 1977 to 80. Before participating in Lok Sabha elections, he was a member of the Andhra Pradesh Legislative Assembly from 1962 to 1971. He was affiliated with the Indian National Congress.

== Biography ==
He was born to Mirza Abdul Jawad in Mallepally Hyderabad, Andhra Pradesh on 19 October 1921. He was last elected to Rajya Sabha in 1990 and served as its member until 1996. He also participated in the 1969 Telangana Agitation.

Before joining the Indian National Congress, he was affiliated with Telangana Praja Samithi from 1969 to 1971. He later moved to Congress and served a vice-president of the City Congress Committee from 1962 to 1969, and as president of the Pant Education Society, and Tenant Association from 1960 to 1977. He was later appointed as a vice-president of the Hut Association and Rickshaw Union, and later convenor of Anti-Communal Associations and Association for Eradication of Poverty. He also served as a general secretary of the Nationalist Kashmir Front in 1958.

Prior to electing to Lok Sabha in 1971 Indian general election, he was a member of Andhra Pradesh Legislative Assembly (1962–67) and was re-elected to assembly in 1967 until his second term ended in 1971. During his assembly career, he was appointed as a state Home Minister in 1978 by Marri Chenna Reddy. He was living in Washington D.C., however when Marri Chenna Reddy was re-elected as a chief minister, he invited Hashim to India and appointed him as a member of the Rajya Sabha.

== Personal life ==
He was married to Khursheed, with whom he had six children, including four daughters and two sons. He later went to Washington D. C. where he died on 22 December 2013 from multimorbidity.
