= Rabindra Kumar Jena =

Indian politician

Member: 16th Lok Sabha
- In office 2014–2019
- Preceded by: Srikant Kumar Jena
- Succeeded by: Pratap Chandra Sarangi
- Constituency: Balasore

Personal details
- Born: 4 August 1967
- Party: Bharatiya Janata Party
- Other political affiliations: Biju Janata Dal (till 2026)
- Spouse: Subasini Jena
- Profession: Politician

Rabindra Kumar Jena is an Indian politician. He was working as managing director of Balasore Alloys Ltd. He was elected to the 16th Lok Sabha in 2014 from Balasore constituency in Odisha. He is a member of the Biju Janata Dal (BJD) political party. In May 2019 Parliamentary Elections, he was defeated by Pratap Sarangi of BJP by a small margin His activity in the parliament in terms of attendance, debate participation and number of questions asked and bills raised is among the highest

== Positions held ==
Period	Position	Ref
May 2014	Elected to 16th Lok Sabha	
1 Sep. 2014 onwards	Member, Standing Committee on Industry	
1 Sep. 2014 onwards	Member, Consultative Committee, Ministry of Communications and Information Technology	
1 May 2017 onwards	Member, Committee on Public Undertakings	

== Awards and recognition ==
Awards which include : the Rajiv Gandhi Sadbhavana Award - by Rajiv Gandhi Forum, Odisha; Utkal Samman - 2004; Arch of Excellence (Business) Award - 2004; Gem of India Award - 2004; Maharaja Sri Ramchandra Bhanjdeo Award; Industrial Promotion in the State Award - 2005 by Governor of Odisha; Rajiv Gandhi Rashtriya Ekta Samman - 2005, New Delhi; State Level Excellence Award - 2005 By Hon'ble Chief Minister of Odisha; Bhartiya Vikas Ratan Award - 2007; Bharat Gaurav Award by Institute of Economic Studies - 2008; Award of Excellence by Hon'ble Governor of Odisha for Highest Relief Distribution during flood in Balasore District - 2008; Pride of the Nation Award - 2008; Think Odisha Leadership Award - 2010 for Best Education Support by Hon'ble Governor of Odisha.

== See also ==
- Indian general election, 2014 (Odisha)
