= List of members of the 6th Lok Sabha =

Members of Lok Sabha (1977-80)

This is a list of members of the 6th Lok Sabha arranged by state or territory represented. These members of the lower house of the Indian Parliament were elected to the 6th Lok Sabha (1977 to 1980) at the 1977 Indian general election.

- NOTE: All Janata Party candidates were elected under the name Bharatiya Lok Dal, as Janata Party was officially registered only after the elections.

== Andaman and Nicobar Islands (1) ==
Keys: INC (1)

No.	Constituency	Member of Parliament	Party affiliation	Roles and responsibilities
1	Andaman & Nicobar Islands	Manoranjan Bhakta	Indian National Congress	

== Andhra Pradesh (42) ==
INC (41) JP (1)

No.	Constituency	Member of Parliament	Party affiliation	Roles and responsibilities
1	Srikakulam	Boddepalli Rajagopala Rao	Indian National Congress	
2	Parvathipuram (ST)	Kishore Chandra Deo	Indian National Congress	Minister of State in the Ministry of Steel, Mines and Coal (August 4, 1979 – January 14, 1980)
3	Bobbili	Pusapati Vijayarama Gajapati Raju	Indian National Congress	
4	Visakhapatnam	Dronamraju Satyanarayana	Indian National Congress	
5	Bhadrachalam (ST)	B. Radhabai Ananda Rao	Indian National Congress	
6	Anakapalli	S. R. A. S. Appala Naidu	Indian National Congress	
7	Kakinada	M. S. Sanjeevi Rao	Indian National Congress	
8	Rajahmundry	S. B. P. Pattabhirama Rao	Indian National Congress	
9	Amalapuram (SC)	Kusuma Murthy	Indian National Congress	
10	Narasapur	Subhash Chandra Bose Alluri	Indian National Congress	
11	Eluru	Kommareddi Suryanarayana	Indian National Congress	
12	Machilipatnam	Ankineedu Maganti	Indian National Congress	
13	Vijayawada	Godey Murahari	Indian National Congress	Deputy Speaker of the Lok Sabha (1 April 1977 – 22 August 1979)
14	Tenali	Meduri Nageswara Rao	Indian National Congress	
15	Guntur	Kotha Raghuramaiah	Indian National Congress	
16	Bapatla	P. Ankineedu Prasada Rao	Indian National Congress	Minister of State in the Ministry of Tourism and Civil Aviation (August 4, 1979 – January 14, 1980)
17	Narasaraopet	Kasu Brahmananda Reddy	Indian National Congress	Minister of Industry (July 30, 1979 – November 27, 1979)
18	Ongole	Puli Venkata Reddy	Indian National Congress	
19	Nellore (SC)	Kamakshaiah Doddavarapu	Indian National Congress	
20	Tirupati (SC)	Balakrishnaiah Tambura	Indian National Congress	
21	Chittoor	Paturi Rajagopala Naidu	Indian National Congress	
22	Rajampet	Pothuraju Parthasarthy	Indian National Congress	
23	Cuddapah	Kandula Obul Reddy	Indian National Congress	
24	Hindupur	Pamudurthi Bayapa Reddy	Indian National Congress	
25	Anantapur	Darur Pullaiah	Indian National Congress	
26	Kurnool	Kotla Vijaya Bhaskara Reddy	Indian National Congress	
27	Nandyal	Neelam Sanjeeva Reddy	Janata Party	Speaker of the Lok Sabha (26 March 1977 – 13 July 1977)
28	Nagarkurnool (SC)	Mailala Bheeshma Dev	Indian National Congress	
29	Mahabubnagar	J. Rameshwar Rao	Indian National Congress	
30	Hyderabad	K. S. Narayana	Indian National Congress	
31	Secunderabad	M. M. Hashim	Indian National Congress	
32	Siddipet (SC)	Gaddam Venkatswamy	Indian National Congress	
33	Medak	Mallikarjun Goud	Indian National Congress	
34	Nizamabad	Mudaganti Ram Gopal Reddy	Indian National Congress	
35	Adilabad	G. Narsimha Reddy	Indian National Congress	
36	Peddapalli (SC)	V. Tulsiram	Indian National Congress	
37	Karimnagar	M. Satyanarayan Rao	Indian National Congress	
38	Hanamkonda	P. V. Narasimha Rao	Indian National Congress	
39	Warangal	S. B. Giri	Indian National Congress	
40	Khammam	Jalagam Kondala Rao	Indian National Congress	
41	Nalgonda	Mohd. Abdul Lateef	Indian National Congress	
42	Miryalguda	G. S. Reddi	Indian National Congress	

== Arunachal Pradesh (2) ==
INC (1) IND (1)

No.	Constituency	Member of Parliament	Party affiliation	Roles and responsibilities
1	Arunachal West	Rinchin Khandu Khimre	Indian National Congress	
2	Arunachal East	Bakin Pertin	Independent politician	

== Assam (14) ==
INC (10) JP (3) IND (1)

No.	Constituency	Member of Parliament	Party affiliation	Roles and responsibilities
1	Karimganj (SC)	Nihar Ranjan Laskar	Indian National Congress	
2	Silchar	Rashida Haque Choudhury	Indian National Congress	Minister of State in the Ministry of Education, Culture and Social Welfare (30 July 1979 – 24 August 1979); Minister of State in the Ministry of Education and Culture (24 August 1979 – 14 January 1980)
3	Autonomous District (ST)	Biren Singh Engti	Indian National Congress	
4	Dhubri	Ahmmad Hossen	Indian National Congress	
5	Kokrajhar (ST)	Charan Narzary	Independent politician	
6	Barpeta	Ismail Hossain Khan	Indian National Congress	
7	Gauhati	Renuka Devi Barkataki	Janata Party	
8	Mangaldoi	Hiralal Patowary	Janata Party	
9	Tezpur	Purna Narayan Sinha	Janata Party	
10	Nowgong	D. K. Barooah	Indian National Congress	
11	Kaliabor	Bedabrata Barua	Indian National Congress	Minister of State in the Ministry of External Affairs (4 August 1979 – 14 January 1980)
12	Jorhat	Tarun Gogoi	Indian National Congress	
13	Dibrugarh	Haren Bhumij	Indian National Congress	
14	Lakhimpur	Lalit Kumar Doley	Indian National Congress	

== Bihar (54) ==
JP (52) JKP (1) IND (1)

No.	Constituency	Member of Parliament	Party affiliation	Roles and responsibilities
1	Bagaha (SC)	Jagannath Prasad Swatantra	Janata Party	
2	Bettiah	Fazlur Rahman	Janata Party	Minister of Labour (July 30, 1979, to January 14, 1980); Minister of Muslim Waqfs (December 7, 1979, to January 14, 1980)
3	Motihari	Thakur Ramapati Singh	Janata Party	
4	Gopalganj	Dwarka Nath Tiwary	Janata Party	
5	Siwan	Mrityunjay Prasad	Janata Party	
6	Maharajganj	Ramdeo Singh	Janata Party	
7	Chapra	Lalu Prasad Yadav	Janata Party	
8	Hajipur (SC)	Ram Vilas Paswan	Janata Party	
9	Vaishali	Digvijay Narain Singh	Janata Party	
10	Muzaffarpur	George Fernandes	Janata Party	Minister of Communications (March 27, 1977 – July 6, 1977); Minister of Industry (July 6, 1977 – July 15, 1979)
11	Sitamarhi	Shyam Sunder Das	Janata Party	
12	Sheohar	Thakur Girjanandan Singh	Janata Party	
13	Madhubani	Hukmdev Narayan Yadav	Janata Party	
14	Jhanjharpur	Dhanik Lal Mandal	Janata Party	Minister of State in the Ministry of Home Affairs (July 30, 1979, to January 14, 1980)
15	Darbhanga	Surendra Jha 'Suman'	Janata Party	
16	Rosera (SC)	Ram Sewak Hazari	Janata Party	
17	Samastipur	Karpoori Thakur	Janata Party	
18	Barh	Shyam Sunder Gupta	Janata Party	
19	Balia	Ramajiwan Singh	Janata Party	
20	Saharsa	Vinayak Prasad Yadav	Janata Party	
21	Madhepura	Bindhyeshwari Prasad Mandal	Janata Party	
22	Araria (SC)	Mahendra Narayan Sardar	Janata Party	
23	Kishanganj	Halimuddin Ahmed	Janata Party	
24	Purnea	Lakhan Lal Kapoor	Janata Party	
25	Katihar	Yuvraj	Janata Party	
26	Rajmahal (ST)	Father Anthoni Murmu	Janata Party	
27	Dumka (ST)	Bateshwar Hemram	Janata Party	
28	Godda	Jagdambi Prasad Yadav	Janata Party	
29	Banka	Limaye Madhu	Janata Party	
30	Bhagalpur	Dr. Ramji Singh	Janata Party	
31	Khagaria	Gyaneshwar Prasad Yadav	Janata Party	
32	Monghyr	Shri Krishna Singh	Janata Party	
33	Begusarai	Shyam Nandan Mishra	Janata Party	Minister of External Affairs (July 28, 1979, to January 14, 1980); Minister of Communications (December 7, 1979, to January 14, 1980)
34	Nalanda	Birendra Prasad	Janata Party	
35	Patna	Maha Maya Prasad Sinha	Janata Party	
36	Arrah	Chandradeo Prasad Verma	Janata Party	
37	Buxar	Rama Nand Tiwary	Janata Party	
38	Sasaram (SC)	Jagjivan Ram	Janata Party	Deputy Prime Minister (January 24, 1979 – July 28, 1979); Minister of Defence (March 28, 1977 – July 28, 1979)
39	Bikramganj	Ram Awadhesh Singh	Janata Party	
40	Aurangabad	Satyendra Narain Singh	Janata Party	
41	Jehanabad	Hari Lal Prasad Sinha	Janata Party	
42	Nawada (SC)	Nathuni Ram	Janata Party	
43	Gaya (SC)	Ishwar Chaudhry	Janata Party	
44	Chatra	Sukdeo Prasad Verma	Janata Party	
45	Koderma	Ritlall Prasad Verma	Janata Party	
46	Giridih	Ram Das Singh	Janata Party	
47	Dhanbad	A. K. Roy	Independent politician	
48	Hazaribagh	Kunwar Basant Narain Singh	Janata Party	
49	Ranchi	Ravindra Verma	Janata Party	Minister of Parliamentary Affairs & Minister of Labour (March 26, 1977 – July 28, 1979)
50	Jamshedpur	Rudra Pratap Sarangi	Janata Party	
51	Singhbhum (ST)	Bagun Sumbrai	Jharkhand Party	
52	Khunti (ST)	Karia Munda	Janata Party	
53	Lohardaga (ST)	Lalu Oraon	Janata Party	
54	Palamau (SC)	Ramdeni Ram	Janata Party	

== Chandigarh (1) ==
JP (1)

No.	Constituency	Member of Parliament	Party affiliation	Roles and responsibilities
1	Chandigarh	Krishan Kant	Janata Party	

== Dadra and Nagar Haveli (1) ==
INC (1)

No.	Constituency	Member of Parliament	Party affiliation	Roles and responsibilities
1	Dadra & Nagar Haveli (ST)	Patel Ramubhai Ravjibhai	Indian National Congress	

== Delhi (7) ==
Keys: JP (7)

No.	Constituency	Member of Parliament	Party affiliation	Roles and responsibilities
1	New Delhi	Atal Bihari Vajpayee	Janata Party	Minister of External Affairs (March 26, 1977 – July 28, 1979)
2	South Delhi	Vijay Kumar Malhotra	Janata Party	
3	Outer Delhi	Brahm Perkash	Janata Party	
4	East Delhi	Kishore Lal	Janata Party	
5	Chandni Chowk	Sikander Bakht	Janata Party	Minister of Works, Housing, Supply and Rehabilition (March 26, 1977 – July 28, 1979)
6	Delhi Sadar	Kanwar Lal Gupta	Janata Party	
7	Karol Bagh (SC)	Shiv Narain Sarsonia	Janata Party	

== Goa, Daman and Diu ==
MGP (1) INC (1)

No.	Constituency	Member of Parliament	Party affiliation	Roles and responsibilities
1	Panaji	Kasar Amrut Shivram	Maharashtrawadi Gomantak Party	
2	Mormugao	Faleiro Eduardo Martinho	Indian National Congress	

== Gujarat (26) ==
JP (16) INC (10)

No.	Constituency	Member of Parliament	Party affiliation	Roles and responsibilities
1	Kutch	Dave Anantray Devshankar	Janata Party	
2	Surendranagar	Amin Ramdas Kishordas (R. K. Amin)	Janata Party	
3	Jamnagar	Vinodbhai B. Sheth	Janata Party	
4	Rajkot	Patel Keshubhai Savdasbhai	Janata Party	
5	Porbandar	Patel Dharmasinhbhai Dahyabhai	Janata Party	
6	Junagadh	Nathwani Narendra Pragji	Janata Party	
7	Amreli	Dwarkadas Mohanlal Patel	Indian National Congress	
8	Bhavnagar	Prasannavadan Manilal Mehta	Janata Party	
9	Dhandhuka (SC)	Parmar Natavarlal Bhagavandas	Janata Party	
10	Ahmedabad	Ahesan Jafri	Indian National Congress	
11	Gandhinagar	Purushottam Ganesh Mavalankar	Janata Party	
12	Mehsana	Patel Maniben Vallabhbhai	Janata Party	
13	Patan (SC)	Chavda Khemchandbhai Somabhai	Janata Party	
14	Banaskantha	Chaudhary Motibhai Ranchhodbhai	Janata Party	
15	Sabarkantha	H. M. Patel	Janata Party	Minister of Finance (March 26, 1977 – January 24, 1979); Minister of Home Affairs (January 29, 1979 – July 28, 1979)
16	Kapadvanj	Vaghela Shankarji Laxmanji	Janata Party	
17	Dohad (ST)	Damor Somjibhai Pujabhai	Indian National Congress	
18	Godhra	Desai Hitendrabhai Kanaiyalal	Indian National Congress	
19	Kaira	Desai Dharmsingh Dadubhai	Indian National Congress	
20	Anand	Ajitsinh Fulsinh Dabhi	Indian National Congress	
21	Chhota Udaipur (ST)	Rathawa Amarsinh Viriyabhai	Indian National Congress	
22	Baroda	Gaekwad Fatesinhrao Pratapsinhrao	Indian National Congress	
23	Broach	Patel Ahmedbhai Mohmadbhai	Indian National Congress	
24	Surat	Desai Morarji Ranchhodji	Janata Party	Prime Minister of India (March 24, 1977 – July 28, 1979)
25	Mandvi (ST)	Gamit Chhitubhai Devjibhai	Indian National Congress	
26	Bulsar (ST)	Patel Nanubhai Nichhabhai	Janata Party	

== Haryana (10) ==
JP (10)

No.	Constituency	Member of Parliament	Party affiliation	Roles and responsibilities
1	Ambala (SC)	Suraj Bhan	Janata Party	
2	Kurukshetra	Raghbir Singh	Janata Party	
3	Karnal	Bhagwat Dayal	Janata Party	
4	Sonepat	Mukhtiar Singh	Janata Party	
5	Rohtak	Sher Singh	Janata Party	
6	Faridabad	Dharam Vir Vasisht	Janata Party	
7	Mahendragarh	Manoharlal	Janata Party	
8	Bhiwani	Chandrawati	Janata Party	
9	Hissar	Inder Singh	Janata Party	
10	Sirsa (SC)	Chand Ram	Janata Party	

== Himachal Pradesh (4) ==
JP (4)

No.	Constituency	Member of Parliament	Party affiliation	Roles and responsibilities
1	Simla (SC)	Balak Ram	Janata Party	
2	Mandi	Ganga Singh	Janata Party	
3	Kangra	Durga Chand	Janata Party	
4	Hamirpur	Ranjit Singh	Janata Party	

== Jammu and Kashmir (6) ==
JKN (2) INC (3) IND (1)

No.	Constituency	Member of Parliament	Party affiliation	Roles and responsibilities
1	Baramulla	Abdul Ahad	Jammu & Kashmir National Conference	
2	Srinagar	Akbar Jahan Begam	Jammu & Kashmir National Conference	
3	Anantnag	Mohammad Shafi Qureshi	Indian National Congress	Minister of Tourism and Civil Aviation (July 30, 1979 – January 14, 1980)
4	Ladakh	Parvati Devi	Indian National Congress	
5	Udhampur	Karan Singh	Indian National Congress	Minister of Education, Social Welfare and Culture; Minister of Education and Culture
6	Jammu	Thakur Baldev Singh	Independent politician	

== Karnataka (28) ==
INC (26) JP (2)

No.	Constituency	Member of Parliament	Party affiliation	Roles and responsibilities
1	Bidar (SC)	Shankardev Balaji Rao	Indian National Congress	
2	Gulbarga	Sidram Reddi	Indian National Congress	
3	Raichur	Rajshekhar Mallappa	Indian National Congress	
4	Koppal	Sidrameshwara Swamy Basayya	Indian National Congress	
5	Bellary	K. S. Veera Bhadrappa	Indian National Congress	
6	Davangere	Kondajji Basappa	Indian National Congress	
7	Chitradurga	K. Mallanna	Indian National Congress	
8	Tumkur	K. Lakkappa	Indian National Congress	
9	Chikballapur	M. V. Krishnappa	Indian National Congress	Minister of State in the Ministry of Agriculture and Irrigation (October 25, 1979 – January 14, 1980)
10	Kolar (SC)	G. Y. Krishnan	Indian National Congress	
11	Kanakapura	M. V. Chandrashekara Murthy	Indian National Congress	
12	Bangalore North	C. K. Jaffer Shariff	Indian National Congress	
13	Bangalore South	K. S. Hegde	Janata Party	Speaker of Lok Sabha (21 July 1977 – 21 January 1980)
14	Mandya	K. Chickalingaiah	Indian National Congress	
15	Chamarajanagar (SC)	B. Rachaiah	Indian National Congress	Minister of State in the Ministry of Industry (August 4, 1979 – January 14, 1980)
16	Mysore	H. D. Tulsidas	Indian National Congress	
17	Mangalore	Janardhana Poojary	Indian National Congress	
18	Udupi	T. A. Pai	Indian National Congress	Minister of Railways (July 30, 1979 – January 14, 1980).; Minister of Industry (November 27, 1979 – January 14, 1980).
19	Hassan	S. Nanjesha Gowda	Janata Party	
20	Chikmagalur	D. B. Chandre Gowda	Indian National Congress	
21	Shimoga	A. R. Badarinarayan	Indian National Congress	
22	Kanara	Kadam Balsu Pursu	Indian National Congress	
23	Dharwad South	Mohsin F. H.	Indian National Congress	
24	Dharwad North	Mahishi Sarojini Bindurao	Indian National Congress	
25	Belgaum	Kotrashetti Appayappa Karaveerappa	Indian National Congress	
26	Chikkodi (SC)	B. Shankaranand	Indian National Congress	
27	Bagalkot	Patil Sanganagouda Basangouda	Indian National Congress	
28	Bijapur	Choudhari Kalingappa Bhimanna	Indian National Congress	

== Kerala (20) ==
INC (11) CPI (4) RSP (1) MUL (2) KEC (2)

No.	Constituency	Member of Parliament	Party affiliation	Roles and responsibilities
1	Kasaragod	Ramachandran Kadannappally	Indian National Congress	
2	Cannanore	C. K. Chandrappan	Communist Party of India	
3	Badagara	K. P. Unnikrishnan	Indian National Congress	
4	Calicut	V. A. Seyid Muhammad	Indian National Congress	
5	Manjeri	Ebrahim Sulaiman Sait	Indian Union Muslim League	
6	Ponnani	G. M. Banatwala	Indian Union Muslim League	
7	Palghat	A. Sunnasahib	Indian National Congress	
8	Ottapalam (SC)	K. Kunhambu	Indian National Congress	
9	Trichur	K. A. Rajan	Communist Party of India	
10	Mukundapuram	A. C. George	Indian National Congress	
11	Ernakulam	Henry Austin	Indian National Congress	Minister of State in the Ministry of Commerce and Civil Supplies (July 30, 1979 – January 14, 1980)
12	Muvattupuzha	George J. Mathew	Kerala Congress	
13	Kottayam	Skariah Thomas	Kerala Congress	
14	Idukki	C. M. Stephen	Indian National Congress	Leader of the Opposition in Lok Sabha (12 April 1978 – 9 July 1979)
15	Alleppey	V. M. Sudheeran	Indian National Congress	
16	Mavelikara	B. K. Nair	Indian National Congress	
17	Adoor (SC)	P. K. Kodiyan	Communist Party of India	
18	Quilon	N. Sreekantan Nair	Revolutionary Socialist Party	
19	Chirayinkil	Vayalar Ravi	Indian National Congress	
20	Trivandrum	M. N. Govindan Nair	Communist Party of India	

== Lakshadweep (1) ==
INC (1)

No.	Constituency	Member of Parliament	Party affiliation	Roles and responsibilities
1	Lakshadweep (ST)	Muhammed Sayeed Padannatha	Indian National Congress	

== Madhya Pradesh (40) ==
JP (37) RPK (1) INC (1) IND (1)

No.	Constituency	Member of Parliament	Party affiliation	Roles and responsibilities
1	Morena (SC)	Chhabiram Argal	Janata Party	
2	Bhind	Raghubir Singh Machhand	Janata Party	
3	Gwalior	Narayan Krishna Shejwalker	Janata Party	
4	Guna	Madhav Rao Scindia	Independent politician	
5	Sagar (SC)	Narmada Prasad Rai	Janata Party	
6	Khajuraho	Laxmi Narain Nayak	Janata Party	
7	Damoh	Narendra Singh Yadvendra Singh	Janata Party	
8	Satna	Sukhendra Singh	Janata Party	
9	Rewa	Yammuna Prasad	Janata Party	
10	Sidhi	Surya Narayan Singh	Janata Party	
11	Shahdol (ST)	Dalpat Singh Paraste	Janata Party	
12	Surguja (ST)	Larang Sai	Janata Party	
13	Raigarh (ST)	Narhari Prasad Sukhdeo Sai	Janata Party	
14	Janjgir	Madan Bhaiya	Janata Party	
15	Bilaspur	Niranjan Prasad Kesharwani	Janata Party	
16	Sarangarh (SC)	Govind Ram Miri	Janata Party	
17	Raipur	Purushottam Lal Kaushik	Janata Party	Minister of Tourism and Civil Aviation (March 26, 1977 – July 15, 1979); Minister of Information and Broadcasting (July 30, 1979 – January 14, 1980)
18	Mahasamund	Brijlal Verma	Janata Party	Minister of Industry (March 28, 1977 – July 6, 1977); Minister of Communications (July 6, 1977 – July 28, 1979)
19	Kanker (ST)	Aghansingh	Janata Party	
20	Bastar (ST)	Drigpal Shah Keshri Shah	Janata Party	
21	Durg	Mohan Bhaiya	Janata Party	
22	Rajnandgaon	Madan Tiwary	Janata Party	
23	Balaghat	Kacharu Lal Hemraj Jain	Republican Party of India (Khobragade)	
24	Mandla (ST)	Shyamlal Dhurve	Janata Party	
25	Jabalpur	Sharad Yadav	Janata Party	
26	Seoni	Nirmal Chandra Jain	Janata Party	
27	Chhindwara	Gargishankar Ramkrishna Mishra	Indian National Congress	
28	Betul	Subhash Chandra Ahuja	Janata Party	
29	Hoshangabad	Kamath Hari Vishnu	Janata Party	
30	Bhopal	Arif Beg	Janata Party	
31	Vidisha	Raghavji	Janata Party	
32	Rajgarh	Pandit Vashant Kumar Ram Krishna	Janata Party	
33	Shajapur (SC)	Phool Chand Verma	Janata Party	
34	Khandwa	Parmanand Thakurdas Govindjiwala	Janata Party	
35	Khargone	Rameshwar Patidar	Janata Party	
36	Dhar (ST)	Bharat Singh Gulab Singh	Janata Party	
37	Indore	Kalyan Jain	Janata Party	
38	Ujjain (SC)	Hukumchand Kachhaway	Janata Party	
39	Jhabua (ST)	Bhagirath Bhawar	Janata Party	
40	Mandsaur	Laxminarayan Pandey	Janata Party	

== Maharashtra (48) ==
JP (19) INC (20) PWP (5) CPI(M) (3) RPK (1)

No.	Constituency	Member of Parliament	Party affiliation	Roles and responsibilities
1	Rajapur	Madhu Dandavate	Janata Party	Minister of Railways
2	Ratnagiri	Parulekar Bapusaheb	Janata Party	
3	Kolaba	Dinkar Balu Patil	Peasants and Workers Party of India	
4	Bombay South	Rajada Ratansingh Gokuldas	Janata Party	
5	Bombay South Central	Kamble Bapu Chandrasen	Janata Party	
6	Bombay North Central	Ahilya P. Rangnekar	Communist Party of India (Marxist)	
7	Bombay North East	Subramaniam Swamy	Janata Party	
8	Bombay North West	Ram Jethmalani	Janata Party	
9	Bombay North	Gore Mrinal Keshav	Janata Party	
10	Thane	Mhalgi Ramchandra Kashinath	Janata Party	
11	Dahanu (ST)	Kom Lahanu Shidava	Communist Party of India (Marxist)	
12	Nashik	Hande Vithalrao Ganpatrao	Janata Party	
13	Malegaon (ST)	Mahale Hari Shankar	Janata Party	
14	Dhulia	Patil Vijaykumar Naval	Indian National Congress	
15	Nandurbar (ST)	Naik Surupsingh Hariya	Indian National Congress	
16	Erandol	Patil Sonusing Dhansing	Janata Party	
17	Jalgaon	Borole Yashwant Mansaram	Janata Party	
18	Buldhana (SC)	Gawai Daulat Gunaji	Republican Party of India (Khobragade)	
19	Akola	Sathe Vasantrao Purushottam	Indian National Congress	
20	Washim	Naik Vasantrao Phulsing	Indian National Congress	
21	Amravati	Bonde Nana Mahadeo	Indian National Congress	
22	Ramtek	Barve Jatiramji Chaitramji	Indian National Congress	
23	Nagpur	Awari Gev Mancharsha	Indian National Congress	
24	Bhandara	Mankar Laxmanrao Bisanji	Janata Party	
25	Chimur	Thakur Krishnarao Dagoji	Indian National Congress	
26	Chandrapur	Raje Vishveshvarrao	Janata Party	
27	Wardha	Gode Santoshrao Vyankatrao	Indian National Congress	
28	Yeotmal	Jawade Shridharrao Natthobaji	Indian National Congress	
29	Hingoli	Patil Chandrakant Ramkrishna	Janata Party	
30	Nanded	Dhondge Keshavrao Shankarrao	Peasants and Workers Party of India	
31	Parbhani	Deshmukh Sheshrao Apparao	Peasants and Workers Party of India	
32	Jalna	Pundalik Hari Danve	Janata Party	
33	Aurangabad	Bapu Kaldate	Janata Party	
34	Beed	Burande Gangadhar Appa	Communist Party of India (Marxist)	
35	Latur	Patil Uddhavrao Sahebrrao	Peasants and Workers Party of India	
36	Osmanabad (SC)	Shrangare Tukaram Sadashiv	Indian National Congress	Minister of State in the Ministry of Communications
37	Solapur	Damani Surajratn Fatehchand	Indian National Congress	
38	Pandharpur (SC)	Thorat Sandipan Bhagwan	Indian National Congress	
39	Ahmednagar	Shinde Annasaheb Pandurang	Indian National Congress	
40	Kopargaon	Vikhe Eknathrao Vithalrao	Indian National Congress	
41	Khed	Annasaheb Magar	Indian National Congress	
42	Pune	Mohan Dharia	Janata Party	Minister of Commerce; Minister of Civil Supplies and Cooperation
43	Baramati	Sambhajirao Kakade	Janata Party	
44	Satara	Chavan Yashwantrao Balwantrao	Indian National Congress	Leader of the Opposition in Lok Sabha; Deputy Prime Minister; Minister of Home Affairs
45	Karad	Chavan Premlabai Dajisaheb	Indian National Congress	
46	Sangli	Gotkhinde Ganapatrao Tukaram	Indian National Congress	
47	Ichalkaranji	Mane Rajaram alias Balasaheb Shankarrao	Indian National Congress	
48	Kolhapur	Desai Dajiba Balwantrao	Peasants and Workers Party of India	

== Manipur (2) ==
INC (2)

No.	Constituency	Member of Parliament	Party affiliation	Roles and responsibilities
1	Inner Manipur	N. Tombi Singh	Indian National Congress	
2	Outer Manipur (ST)	Yangmaso Shaiza	Indian National Congress	

== Meghalaya (2) ==
INC (1) IND (1)

No.	Constituency	Member of Parliament	Party affiliation	Roles and responsibilities
1	Shillong	Hoping Stone Lyngdoh	Independent politician	
2	Tura	Purno A. Sangma	Indian National Congress	

== Mizoram (1) ==
IND (1)

No.	Constituency	Member of Parliament	Party affiliation	Roles and responsibilities
1	Mizoram	R. Rothuama	Independent politician	

== Nagaland (1) ==
UDF (1)

No.	Constituency	Member of Parliament	Party affiliation	Roles and responsibilities
1	Nagaland	Rano M. Shaiza	United Democratic Front	

== Orissa (21) ==
JP (15) INC (4) CPI(M) (1) IND (1)

No.	Constituency	Member of Parliament	Party affiliation	Roles and responsibilities
1	Mayurbhanj (ST)	Chandra Mohan Sinha	Janata Party	
2	Balasore	Samarendra Kundu	Janata Party	
3	Bhadrak (SC)	Bairagi Jena	Janata Party	
4	Jajpur (SC)	Rama Chandra Mallick	Janata Party	
5	Kendrapara	Bijayananda Pattanayak	Janata Party	Minister of Steel and Mines (March 26, 1977 – July 15, 1979); Minister of Steel, Mines and Coal (July 30, 1979 – January 14, 1980)
6	Cuttack	Sarat Kumar Kar	Janata Party	
7	Jagatsinghpur	Pradyumna Kishore Bal	Janata Party	
8	Puri	Padmacharan Samantasinhar	Janata Party	
9	Bhubaneswar	Sivaji Patnaik	Communist Party of India (Marxist)	
10	Aska	Rama Chandra Rath	Indian National Congress	
11	Berhampur	Jagannath Rao R.	Indian National Congress	
12	Koraput (ST)	Giridhar Gamang	Indian National Congress	
13	Nowrangpur (ST)	Khagapati Pradhani	Indian National Congress	
14	Kalahandi	Pratap Keshari Deo	Independent politician	
15	Phulbani (SC)	Sribatcha Digal	Janata Party	
16	Bolangir	Ainthu Sahoo	Janata Party	
17	Sambalpur	Gananath Pradhan	Janata Party	
18	Deogarh	Pabitra Mohan Pradhan	Janata Party	
19	Dhenkanal	Debendra Satpathy	Janata Party	
20	Sundargarh (ST)	Debananda Amat	Janata Party	
21	Keonjhar (ST)	Govinda Munda	Janata Party	

== Pondicherry (1) ==
Keys: AIADMK (1)

No.	Constituency	Member of Parliament	Party affiliation	Roles and responsibilities
1	Pondicherry	Aravinda Bala Pajanor	All India Anna Dravida Munnetra Kazhagam	Minister of Petroleum, Chemicals and Fertilizers (1979)

== Punjab (13) ==
Keys: SAD (9) JP (3) CPI(M) (1)

No.	Constituency	Member of Parliament	Party affiliation	Roles and responsibilities
1	Gurdaspur	Yagya Datt	Janata Party	
2	Amritsar	Baldev Parkash	Janata Party	
3	Tarn Taran	Mohan Singh Tur	Shiromani Akali Dal	
4	Jullundur	Iqbal Singh Dhillon	Shiromani Akali Dal	
5	Phillaur (SC)	Bhagat Ram	Communist Party of India (Marxist)	
6	Hoshiarpur	Balbir Singh	Janata Party	
7	Ropar (SC)	Basant Singh	Shiromani Akali Dal	
8	Patiala	Gurcharan Singh Tohra	Shiromani Akali Dal	
9	Ludhiana	Jagdev Singh Talwandi	Shiromani Akali Dal	
10	Sangrur	Surjit Singh	Shiromani Akali Dal	Minister of Agriculture and Irrigation
11	Bhatinda (SC)	Dhanna Singh	Shiromani Akali Dal	
12	Faridkot	Parkash Singh	Shiromani Akali Dal	Minister of Communications; Minister of Agriculture and Irrigation
13	Ferozepur	Mohinder Singh Sayanwala	Shiromani Akali Dal	

== Rajasthan (25) ==
JP (24) INC (1)

No.	Constituency	Member of Parliament	Party affiliation	Roles and responsibilities
1	Ganganagar (SC)	Bega Ram Chauhan	Janata Party	
2	Bikaner	Hari Ram Makkasar	Janata Party	
3	Churu	Daulat Ram	Janata Party	
4	Jhunjhunu	Kanhaiya Lal	Janata Party	
5	Sikar	Jagdish Prasad Mathur	Janata Party	
6	Jaipur	Satish Chander	Janata Party	
7	Dausa	Nathu Singh	Janata Party	
8	Alwar	Ramji Lal Yadav	Janata Party	
9	Bharatpur	Ram Kishan	Janata Party	
10	Bayana (SC)	Shyam Sunder Lal	Janata Party	
11	Sawai Madhopur (ST)	Meetha Lal	Janata Party	
12	Ajmer	Srikaran Sharda	Janata Party	
13	Tonk (SC)	Ram Kanwar	Janata Party	
14	Kota	Krishna Kumar Goyal	Janata Party	
15	Jhalawar	Chaturbhuj	Janata Party	
16	Banswara (ST)	Heera Bhai	Janata Party	
17	Salumber (ST)	Ialiya	Janata Party	
18	Udaipur	Bhanu Kumar Shastri	Janata Party	
19	Chittorgarh	Shyam Sunder	Janata Party	
20	Bhilwara	Rooplal Somani	Janata Party	
21	Pali	Amrit Nehata	Janata Party	
22	Jalore (SC)	Hukam Ram	Janata Party	
23	Barmer	Tan Singh	Janata Party	
24	Jodhpur	Ranchhordas Gattani	Janata Party	
25	Nagaur	Nathuram Mirdha	Indian National Congress	Minister of State in the Ministry of Agriculture and Irrigation (August 4, 1979, to October 25, 1979); Minister of State in the Ministry of Finance (October 25, 1979, to January 14, 1980)

== Sikkim (1) ==
Keys: INC (1)

No.	Constituency	Member of Parliament	Party affiliation	Roles and responsibilities
1	Sikkim	Chatra Bahadur Chhetri	Indian National Congress	

== Tamil Nadu (39) ==
DMK (2) INC(O) (3) INC (14) AIADMK (17) CPI (3)

No.	Constituency	Member of Parliament	Party affiliation	Roles and responsibilities
1	Madras North	Asai Thambi A. V. P.	Dravida Munnetra Kazhagam	
2	Madras Central	Ramachandran P.	Indian National Congress (O)	Minister of Energy (26 March 1977 – 28 July 1979)
3	Madras South	Venkataraman R.	Indian National Congress	
4	Sriperumbudur (SC)	Jaganathan S.	All India Anna Dravida Munnetra Kazhagam	
5	Chengalpattu	Mohanarangam R.	All India Anna Dravida Munnetra Kazhagam	
6	Arakkonam	Alagesan O. V.	Indian National Congress	
7	Vellore	Dhandayuthapani V.	Indian National Congress (O)	
8	Tiruppattur	Viswanathan C. N.	Dravida Munnetra Kazhagam	
9	Wandiwash	Venugopal Gounder	All India Anna Dravida Munnetra Kazhagam	
10	Tindivanam	Lakshminarayanan M. R.	Indian National Congress	
11	Cuddalore	Bhuvarahan G.	Indian National Congress	
12	Chidambaram (SC)	Murugesan A.	All India Anna Dravida Munnetra Kazhagam	
13	Dharmapuri	Ramamurthy K.	Indian National Congress	
14	Krishnagiri	Periasamy P. V.	All India Anna Dravida Munnetra Kazhagam	
15	Rasipuram (SC)	Devarajan B.	Indian National Congress	
16	Salem	Kannan P.	All India Anna Dravida Munnetra Kazhagam	
17	Tiruchengode	Kolanthaivelu R.	All India Anna Dravida Munnetra Kazhagam	
18	Nilgiris	Ramalingam P. S.	All India Anna Dravida Munnetra Kazhagam	
19	Gobichettipalayam	Ramaswamy K. S.	Indian National Congress	
20	Coimbatore	Parvathi Krishnan	Communist Party of India	
21	Pollachi (SC)	Raju K. A.	All India Anna Dravida Munnetra Kazhagam	
22	Palani	C. Subramaniam	Indian National Congress	Minister of Defence (30 July 1979 – 14 January 1980)
23	Dindigul	Maya Thevar K.	All India Anna Dravida Munnetra Kazhagam	
24	Madurai	Swaminathan R. V.	Indian National Congress	
25	Periyakulam	Ramasamy S.	All India Anna Dravida Munnetra Kazhagam	
26	Karur	Gopal K.	Indian National Congress	
27	Tiruchirappalli	M. Kalyanasundaram	Communist Party of India	
28	Perambalur (SC)	Asokaraj A.	All India Anna Dravida Munnetra Kazhagam	
29	Mayiladuthurai	Kudanthai Ramalingam N.	Indian National Congress	
30	Nagapattinam (SC)	Murugaiyan S. G.	Communist Party of India	
31	Thanjavur	Somasundaram S. D.	All India Anna Dravida Munnetra Kazhagam	
32	Pudukkottai	Elanchezhian V. S.	All India Anna Dravida Munnetra Kazhagam	
33	Sivaganga	P. Thiagarajan	All India Anna Dravida Munnetra Kazhagam	
34	Ramanathapuram	Anbalagan P.	All India Anna Dravida Munnetra Kazhagam	
35	Sivakasi	V. Jayalakshmi	Indian National Congress	
36	Tirunelveli	Arunachalam V.	All India Anna Dravida Munnetra Kazhagam	
37	Tenkasi (SC)	Arunachalam M.	Indian National Congress	
38	Tiruchendur	Kosalram K. T.	Indian National Congress	
39	Nagercoil	Kumari Ananthan N.	Indian National Congress (O)	

== Tripura (2) ==
Keys: JP (1) INC (1)

No.	Constituency	Member of Parliament	Party affiliation	Roles and responsibilities
1	Tripura West	Sachindralal Singha	Janata Party	
2	Tripura East (ST)	Kirit Bikram Kishore Deb Barma	Indian National Congress	

== Uttar Pradesh (85) ==
Keys: JP (85)

No.	Constituency	Member of Parliament	Party affiliation	Roles and responsibilities
1	Tehri Garhwal	Trepansingh Negi	Janata Party	
2	Garhwal	Jagannath Sharma	Janata Party	
3	Almora	Murli Manohar Joshi	Janata Party	
4	Nainital	Bharat Bhushan	Janata Party	
5	Bijnor (SC)	Mahi Lal	Janata Party	
6	Amroha	Chandrapal Singh	Janata Party	
7	Moradabad	Gulam Mohd. Khan	Janata Party	
8	Rampur	Rajendra Kumar Sharma	Janata Party	
9	Sambhal	Shanti Devi	Janata Party	
10	Budaun	Onkar Singh	Janata Party	
11	Aonla	Brij Raj Singh	Janata Party	
12	Bareilly	Ram Murti	Janata Party	
13	Pilibhit	Mohd. Shamusul Hasan Khan	Janata Party	
14	Shahjahanpur	Surendra Vikram	Janata Party	
15	Kheri	S.B. Shah	Janata Party	
16	Shahabad	Ganga Bhakt Singh	Janata Party	
17	Sitapur	Hargovind Verma	Janata Party	
18	Misrikh (SC)	Ram Lal Rahi	Janata Party	
19	Hardoi (SC)	Parmai Lal	Janata Party	
20	Lucknow	Hemwati Nandan Bahuguna	Janata Party	Minister of Chemicals and Fertilizers (1977); Minister of Petroleum, Chemicals and Fertilizers (1977-79); Minister of Finance (1979)
21	Mohanlalganj (SC)	Ram Lal Kuril	Janata Party	
22	Unnao	Raghavendra Singh	Janata Party	
23	Rae Bareli	Raj Narain	Janata Party	Minister of Health and Family Welfare (1977-78)
24	Pratapgarh	Roop Nath Singh Yadava	Janata Party	
25	Amethi	Ravindra Pratap Singh	Janata Party	
26	Sultanpur	Zulfikar Ullah	Janata Party	Minister of Communications (1979); Minister of Muslim Waqfs (1979)
27	Akbarpur (SC)	Mangal Deo Visharad	Janata Party	
28	Faizabad	Anant Ram Jaiswal	Janata Party	
29	Bara Banki (SC)	Ram Kinkar	Janata Party	Minister of Works, Housing, Supply and Rehabilitation (1979-80)
30	Kaiserganj	Rudra Sen	Janata Party	
31	Bahraich	Om Prakash Tyagi	Janata Party	
32	Balrampur	Nanaji Deshmukh	Janata Party	
33	Gonda	Satya Deo Singh	Janata Party	
34	Basti (SC)	Sheo Narain	Janata Party	
35	Domariaganj	Madhav Prasad Tripathi	Janata Party	
36	Khalilabad	Brij Bhushan Tiwari	Janata Party	
37	Bansgaon (SC)	Phirangi Prasad	Janata Party	
38	Gorakhpur	Harikesh Bahadur	Janata Party	
39	Maharajganj	Shibban Lal Saksena	Janata Party	
40	Padrauna	Ram Dhari Shastri	Janata Party	
41	Deoria	Ugrasen	Janata Party	
42	Salempur	Ram Naresh Kushwaha	Janata Party	
43	Ballia	Chandra Shekhar	Janata Party	
44	Ghosi	Shivram	Janata Party	
45	Azamgarh	Ram Naresh	Janata Party	
46	Lalganj (SC)	Ramdhan	Janata Party	
47	Machhlishahr	Raj Keshar Singh	Janata Party	
48	Jaunpur	Yadvendra Dutta Dubey	Janata Party	
49	Saidpur (SC)	Ram Sagar	Janata Party	
50	Ghazipur	Gauri Shanker Rai	Janata Party	
51	Chandauli	Narsingh	Janata Party	Minister of State in the Ministry of Communications (1979-80)
52	Varanasi	Chandra Shekher	Janata Party	
53	Robertsganj (SC)	Sheo Sampat	Janata Party	
54	Mirzapur	Faqir Ali	Janata Party	
55	Phulpur	Kamala Bahuguna	Janata Party	
56	Allahabad	Janeshwar Mishra	Janata Party	Minister of State (I/C) in the Ministry of Shipping and Transport (1979-80)
57	Chail (SC)	Ram Nihor Rakesh	Janata Party	
58	Fatehpur	Bashir Ahmad	Janata Party	
59	Banda	Ambika Prasad	Janata Party	
60	Hamirpur	Tej Pratap Singh	Janata Party	
61	Jhansi	Sushila Nayyar	Janata Party	
62	Jalaun (SC)	Ramcharan	Janata Party	
63	Ghatampur (SC)	Jwala Prasad Kureel	Janata Party	
64	Bilhaur	Ram Gopal Singh	Janata Party	
65	Kanpur	Manohar Lal	Janata Party	
66	Etawah	Arjun Singh Bhadoria	Janata Party	
67	Kannauj	Ram Prakash Tripathi	Janata Party	
68	Farrukhabad	Daya Ram Shakya	Janata Party	
69	Mainpuri	Raghunath Singh Verma	Janata Party	
70	Jalesar	Multan Singh Chaudhary	Janata Party	
71	Etah	Mahadeepak Singh	Janata Party	
72	Firozabad (SC)	Ramji Lal Suman	Janata Party	
73	Agra	Shambhu Nath Chaturvedi	Janata Party	
74	Mathura	Maniram	Janata Party	
75	Hathras (SC)	Ram Prasad Deshmukh	Janata Party	
76	Aligarh	Nawab Singh Chauhan	Janata Party	
77	Khurja (SC)	Mohan Lal	Janata Party	
78	Bulandshahr	Mahmood Hassan Khan	Janata Party	
79	Hapur	Kunwar Mahood Ali Khan	Janata Party	
80	Meerut	Kailash Prakash	Janata Party	
81	Baghpat	Chaudhari Charan Singh	Janata Party	Minister of Home Affairs (1977-78); Deputy Prime Minister (1979-79); Minister of Finance (1979-79); Prime Minister (1979-80)
82	Muzaffarnagar	Saeed Murtaza	Janata Party	
83	Kairana	Chandan Singh	Janata Party	
84	Saharanpur	Rasheed Masood	Janata Party	
85	Hardwar (SC)	Bhagwan Dass	Janata Party	

== West Bengal (42) ==
CPI(M) (17) JP (15) AIFB (3) RSP (3) INC (3) IND (1)

No.	Constituency	Member of Parliament	Party affiliation	Roles and responsibilities
1	Cooch Behar (SC)	Amrendranath Roy Pradhan	All India Forward Bloc	
2	Alipurduars (ST)	Pius Tirkey	Revolutionary Socialist Party	
3	Jalpaiguri	Khagendra Nath Dasgupta	Independent politician	
4	Darjeeling	Krishna Bahadur Chettri	Indian National Congress	
5	Raiganj	Md. Hayat Ali	Janata Party	
6	Balurghat (SC)	Palas Barman	Revolutionary Socialist Party	
7	Malda	Dinesh Chandra Joardar	Communist Party of India (Marxist)	
8	Jangipur	Sasankasekher Sanyal	Communist Party of India (Marxist)	
9	Murshidabad	Syed Kazim Ali Meerza	Janata Party	
10	Berhampore	Tridip Chaudhuri	Revolutionary Socialist Party	
11	Krishnagar	Renupada Das	Communist Party of India (Marxist)	
12	Nabadwip (SC)	Bibha Ghosh (Goswami)	Communist Party of India (Marxist)	
13	Barasat	Chitta Basu	All India Forward Bloc	
14	Basirhat	Alhaj M. A. Hannan	Janata Party	
15	Joynagar (SC)	Sakti Kumar Sarkar	Janata Party	
16	Mathurapur (SC)	Mukunda Kumar Mondal	Communist Party of India (Marxist)	
17	Diamond Harbour	Jyotirmoy Basu	Communist Party of India (Marxist)	
18	Jadavpur	Somnath Chatterjee	Communist Party of India (Marxist)	
19	Barrackpore	Sougata Roy	Indian National Congress	MoS in the Ministry of Petroleum, Chemicals and Fertilizers (1979-80)
20	Dum Dum	Asoke Krishna Dutt	Janata Party	
21	Calcutta North West	Bijoy Singh Nahar	Janata Party	
22	Calcutta North East	Pratap Chandra Chunder	Janata Party	Minister of Education, Social Welfare and Culture (1977-79)
23	Calcutta South	Dilip Chakravarty	Janata Party	
24	Howrah	Samar Mukherjee	Communist Party of India (Marxist)	
25	Uluberia	Shyamaprasanna Bhattacharyya	Communist Party of India (Marxist)	
26	Serampore	Dinen Bhattacharya	Communist Party of India (Marxist)	
27	Hooghly	Bijoy Krishna Modak	Communist Party of India (Marxist)	
28	Arambagh	Prafulla Chandra Sen	Janata Party	
29	Panskura	Abha Maiti	Janata Party	
30	Tamluk	Sushil Kumar Dhara	Janata Party	
31	Contai	Guha Samar	Janata Party	
32	Midnapore	Ghosal Sudhir Kumar	Janata Party	
33	Jhargram (ST)	Jadunath Kisku	Communist Party of India (Marxist)	
34	Purulia	Chittaranjan Mahata	All India Forward Bloc	
35	Bankura	Mondal Bijoy	Janata Party	
36	Vishnupur (SC)	Ajit Kumar Saha	Communist Party of India (Marxist)	
37	Durgapur (SC)	Krishna Chandra Haldar	Communist Party of India (Marxist)	
38	Asansol	Robin Sen	Communist Party of India (Marxist)	
39	Burdwan	Raj Krishna Dawn	Janata Party	
40	Katwa	Dhirendra Nath Basu	Indian National Congress	
41	Bolpur	Saradish Roy	Communist Party of India (Marxist)	
42	Birbhum (SC)	Gadadhar Saha	Communist Party of India (Marxist)	
