= Shyam Sunder Mahapatra =

Indian politician

Member of Parliament, Lok Sabha
- In office 1971–1977
- Preceded by: Samarendra Kundu
- Succeeded by: Samarendra Kundu
- Constituency: Balasore, Odisha

Member of Parliament, Rajya Sabha
- In office 1980–1986
- Constituency: Odisha

Personal details
- Born: 25 January 1929
- Died: 22 April 2006 (aged 78) New Delhi
- Party: Indian National Congress
- Spouse: Radha Devi Mohapatra
- Children: 3

Shyam Sunder Mahapatra was an Indian politician. He was elected to the Lok Sabha, the lower house of the Parliament of India as a member of the Indian National Congress.

He died on 22 April 2006 in New Delhi.
