= Pratap Sarangi =

Indian politician (born 1955)

Pratap Chandra Sarangi
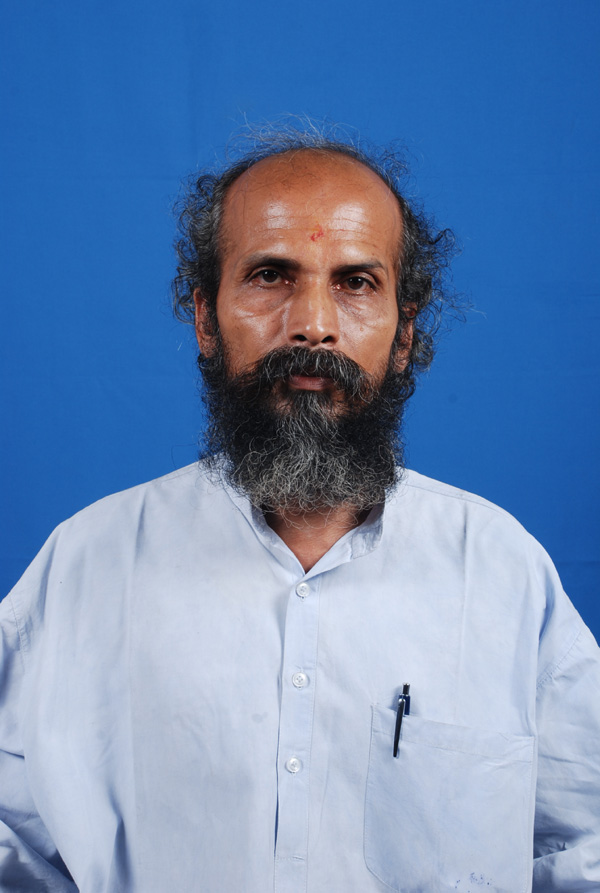

Minister of State, Government of India
- In office 31 May 2019 – 7 July 2021
- Prime Minister: Narendra Modi
- Minister: Nitin Gadkari
- Ministry: Micro, Small and Medium Enterprises
- In office 31 May 2019 – 7 July 2021
- Prime Minister: Narendra Modi
- Minister: Giriraj Singh
- Ministry: Animal Husbandry, Dairying and Fisheries

Member of Parliament, Lok Sabha
- Incumbent
- Assumed office 23 May 2019
- Preceded by: Rabindra Kumar Jena
- Constituency: Balasore

Member of Odisha Legislative Assembly
- In office 2004–2014
- Preceded by: Pradipta Panda
- Succeeded by: Sukanta Kumar Nayak
- Constituency: Nilagiri

Personal details
- Born: 4 January 1955 (age 71) Gopinathpur, Odisha, India
- Party: Bharatiya Janata Party
- Education: Fakir Mohan College, Utkal University

Pratap Chandra Sarangi (born 4 January 1955) is an Indian politician from Balasore, Odisha. He serves as a National Executive Member of the Bharatiya Janata Party (BJP) and a member of parliament from the Balasore Lok Sabha constituency in Odisha. He was the Minister of State in the Government of India for Animal Husbandry, Dairying and Fisheries and Micro, Small and Medium Enterprises (2019-2021) and a two-time member of the Odisha Legislative Assembly from Nilgiri (2004-2014). Sarangi was Odisha's state unit chief of the Bajrang Dal, an Indian Hindutva militant organisation, when Graham Staines, an Australian Christian Missionary, and his two minor children were burnt alive by the members of the right-wing outfit in 1999. Later he was involved in 2001 Odisha Assembly attack.

He had started many Ekal Vidyalayas in the interiors of the state.

== Early life and education ==
Pratap Chandra Sarangi was born on 4 January 1955 in the village of Gopinathpur, Nilagiri, Balasore into a Brahmin family. He completed his bachelor's degree at Fakir Mohan College, Balasore under Utkal University in 1975.

Since his childhood, Sarangi was a spiritual seeker. He wanted to become a monk of the Ramakrishna Math.

He made several visits to Belur Math, the headquarters of the Ramakrishna Order in Howrah, West Bengal. The monks of the Math discussed with Sarangi about his desire and examined his biodata. They discovered that Sarangi's widowed mother was alive. They insisted that he should go back and serve her. After his return to his village, he became involved in various social activities and politics.

== Career ==
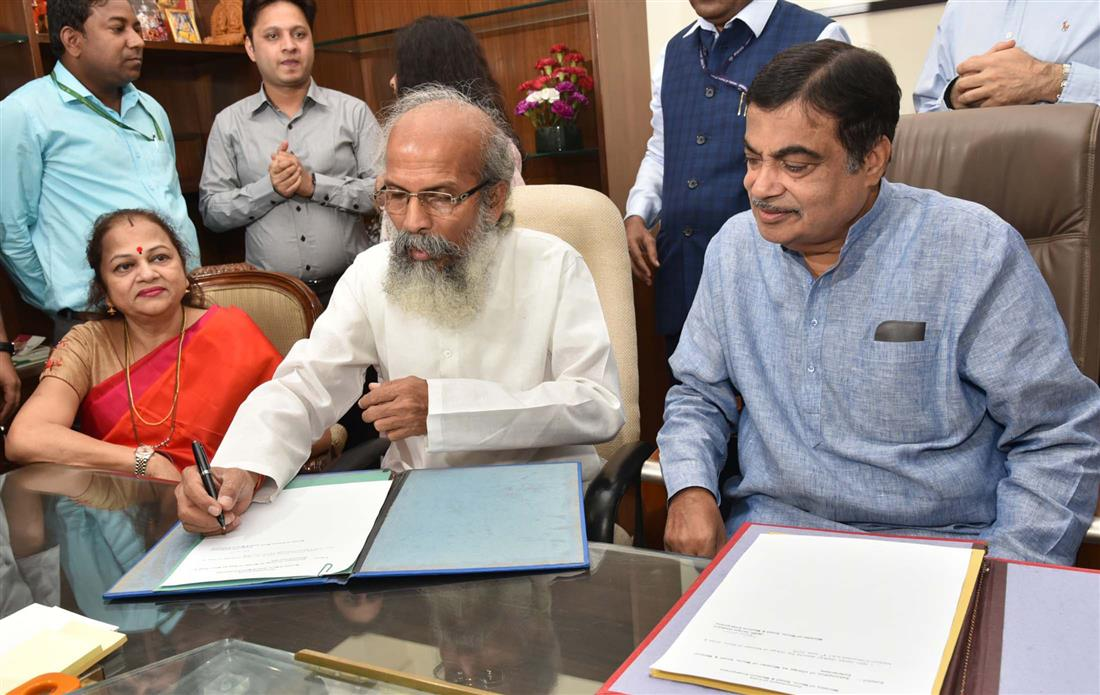
Sarangi taking charge as the Minister of State for Micro, Small and Medium Enterprises, in the presence of Nitin Gadkari, Minister for Micro, Small and Medium Enterprises, in New Delhi on 4 June 2019.

Initially, Sarangi served as a district level volunteer of the Rashtriya Swayamsevak Sangh and also worked for the Vishwa Hindu Parishad and Bajrang Dal. He opened schools for the poor called Samar Kara Kendra, under the Gana Shikhsa Mandir Yojana in tribal villages in Balasore and Mayurbhanj District.

His main part of his life is as a Head Clerk in Nilgiri College, Nilgiri, Balasore, Odisha. He also contested in the 2014 Indian general election from Balasore, Lok Sabha constituency as a BJP candidate, which he lost. He contested again in the 2019 Indian general election from Balasore, Lok Sabha constituency as a BJP candidate, in which he defeated the Biju Janata Dal candidate and sitting MP, Rabindra Kumar Jena, by a margin of 12,956 votes.

In May 2019, Sarangi became Minister of State for Micro, Small and Medium Enterprises and Animal Husbandry, Dairying and Fisheries.

== Controversies ==
In 1999 Australian Christian missionary Graham Staines and his two children were burnt to death while sleeping in their station wagon in the village of Manoharpur-Keonjhar in Odisha, allegedly by a gang of Bajrang Dal. Pratap Sarangi was the chief of the Bajrang Dal during the year 1999. After the trial, a man named Dara Singh who had links to the Bajrang Dal, and 12 others were convicted of the crime in 2003. Mr. Sarangi denied the fact saying that the investigation was not done in an unbiased and proper way. The Orissa High Court commuted a death sentence for Singh two years later and freed 11 others who were sentenced to life-term prison citing no evidence against the accused, including Pratap Sarangi. Although an official inquiry by the Wadhwa Commission, found no evidence of any one single group's involvement in the attack, 13 people associated with Bajrang Dal were later convicted. Another official inquiry by the National Commission for Minorities found that the killers cheered " bajrang dal Zindabad" before the attack.

He was also arrested on charges of rioting, arson, assault and damaging government property after a 2002 attack on the Orissa state assembly by Hindu right-wing groups, including the Bajrang Dal.

On 19 December 2024, he alleged that he was injured when another MP Mukesh Rajput fell on him after being pushed by Congress leader Rahul Gandhi.

Gandhi alleged that BJP MPs pushed him and Congress president Mallikarjun Kharge to stop them from entering the Parliament building.

I was trying to go inside... but BJP MPs were trying to stop me; they pushed me away and threatened me... But we do not get affected by this jostling. This is Parliament and we have the right to go inside

— Rahul Gandhi

In a letter to Lok Sabha Speaker Om Birla, Mallikarjun Kharge alleged that BJP MPs had pushed him.

Thereafter, I lost my balance and was forced to sit down on the ground in front of Makar Dwar. This inflicted injury on my knees which have already undergone surgery,

— Mallikarjun Kharge

Both parties, BJP and Congress shared video clips in their defence.

== See also ==
- Ekal Vidyalaya
