= Srikant Kumar Jena =

Indian politician (born 1950)

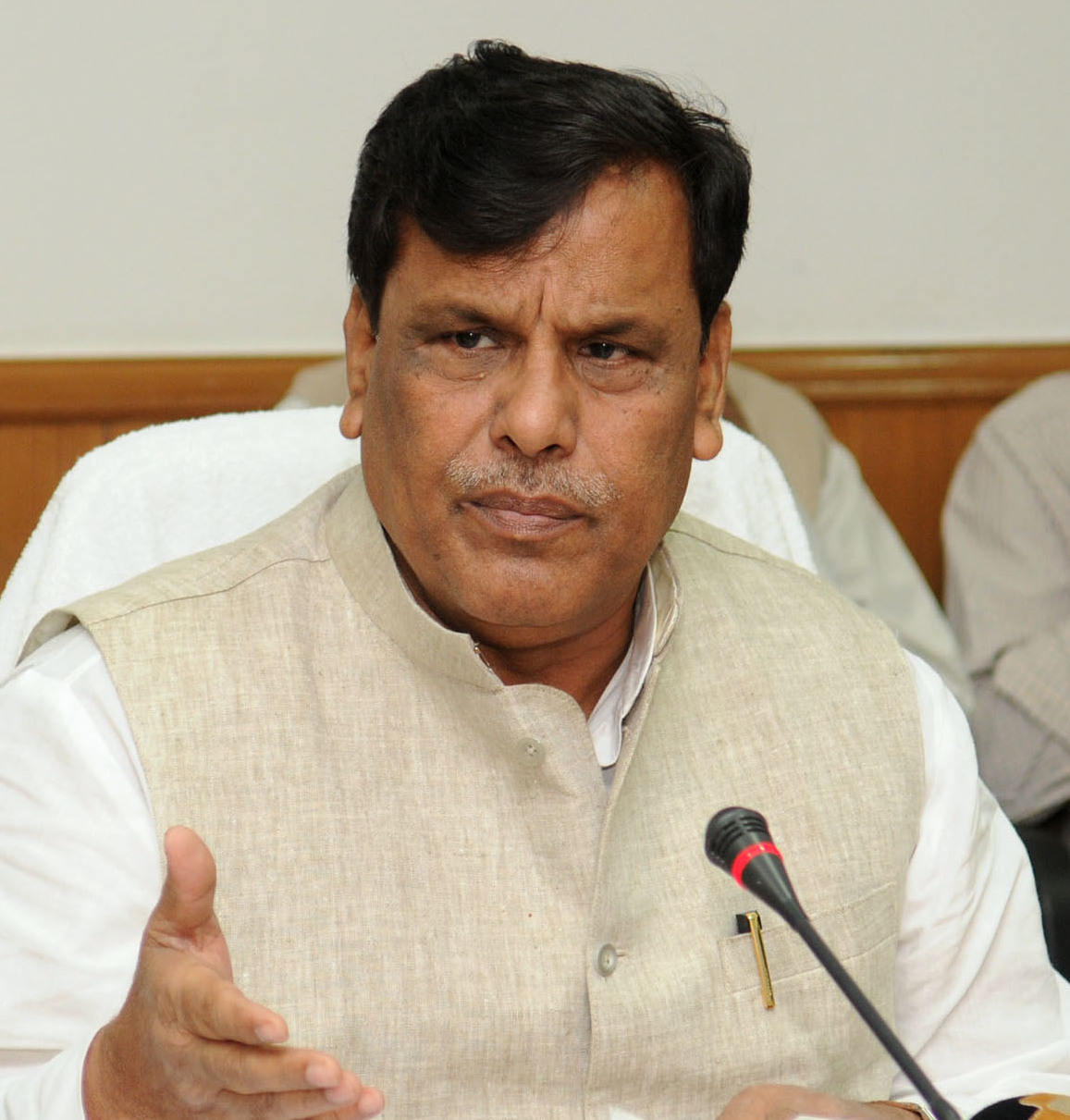
- Jena in 2013

Union Minister of State (Independent Charge) for Chemicals and Fertilizers
- In office 20 March 2013 – 26 May 2014
- Prime Minister: Manmohan Singh
- Preceded by: M. K. Alagiri
- Succeeded by: Ananth Kumar

Union Minister of State (Independent Charge) for Statistics and Programme Implementation
- In office 12 July 2011 – 26 May 2014
- Prime Minister: Manmohan Singh
- Preceded by: M. S. Gill
- Succeeded by: Rao Inderjit Singh

Union Minister of State for Chemicals and Fertilizers
- In office 28 May 2009 – 20 March 2013
- Prime Minister: Manmohan Singh
- Minister: M. K. Alagiri

Union Minister of Parliamentary Affairs and Tourism
- In office 29 June 1996 – 19 March 1998
- Prime Minister: H. D. Deve Gowda; I. K. Gujral
- Preceded by: Ram Vilas Paswan (Parliamentary); C. M. Ibrahim (Tourism)
- Succeeded by: Madan Lal Khurana

Union Minister of State for Small Scale, Agro and Rural Industries
- In office 23 April 1990 – 10 November 1990
- Prime Minister: V. P. Singh
- Minister: Ajit Singh

Member of Parliament, Lok Sabha
- In office 16 May 2009 – 17 May 2014
- Preceded by: Kharabela Swain
- Succeeded by: Rabindra Kumar Jena
- Constituency: Balasore
- In office 10 May 1996 – 28 February 1998
- Preceded by: Rabi Ray
- Succeeded by: Prabhat Kumar Samantaray
- Constituency: Kendrapara
- In office 1 December 1989 – 15 May 1996
- Preceded by: Jayanti Patnaik
- Succeeded by: Anadi Sahu
- Constituency: Cuttack

Member, Odisha Legislative Assembly
- In office 1977–1989
- Preceded by: Prahlad Malik
- Succeeded by: Kulamoni Rout
- Constituency: Bari

Personal details
- Born: 18 June 1950 (age 76) Jajpur, Odisha, India
- Party: Indian National Congress
- Other political affiliations: Janata Dal
- As of 15 January, 2012 Source: india.gov.in

Srikant Kumar Jena (born 18 June 1950), is an Indian politician hailing from Ratnagiri, Jajpur district, Odisha. He was the Union Cabinet Minister for Parliamentary Affairs and Tourism in the Gujral ministry and Deve Gowda ministry. He was the Minister of State (Independent charge) for Chemicals & Fertilizers and Statistics & Programme Implementation in the Second Manmohan Singh ministry. He was Union Minister of State, Small Scale Industry, Agro and Rural Industries in the V. P. Singh ministry. He represented the Balasore parliamentary constituency in the 15th Lok Sabha. During his tenure as the MP of Balasore, many developmental works were done for overall development of Balasore in all sectors like infrastructure, education, health and communication. His developmental works for Balasore include establishment of units of the Central Institute of Petrochemicals Engineering & Technology, AIIMS Satellite Centre, Software Technology Park of India and the North Odisha Chamber of Commerce and Industry, upgrading the national highway 60, and the grant of Fakir Mohan Medical College and Hospital.

He had been elected as MLA to Odisha Legislative Assembly, three times between 1977 and 1989. In 1979–80, he was the Minister of State, Industry and Urban Development, Govt. of Odisha. He got elected to Lok Sabha for the first time in 1989 and then subsequently three more times to 9th, 10th and 15th Lok Sabha in 1991, 1996 and 2001 respectively. Between 2019 and 2024, he was out of the party and launched the Samajika Nyay Abhiyan, a non-political social justice movement platform. He rejoined in 2024 and was fielded as the Congress candidate from Balasore.

== See also ==
- Indian general election in Orissa, 2009
- Odisha Pradesh Congress Committee
