= Bhagabat Sahu =

Indian politician

Bhagabat Sahu was the first Member of Parliament from Balasore Parliamentary constituency in 1951. He was a Gandhian and was a freedom fighter from the Eastern part of Odisha.
