= Balasore Lok Sabha constituency =

Lok Sabha Constituency in Odisha

Coordinates: 21.489723°N 86.920189°E

Balasore OD-6
- Lok Sabha constituency
- Interactive map of Balasore Lok Sabha constituency

Constituency details
- Country: India
- Region: East India
- State: Odisha
- Assembly constituencies: Badasahi; Jaleswar; Bhograi; Basta; Balasore; Remuna; Nilgiri
- Established: 1952
- Total electors: 16,10,043 (Note: as on 2024) (Note: as data published by election commission)
- Reservation: None

Member of Parliament
- 18th Lok Sabha
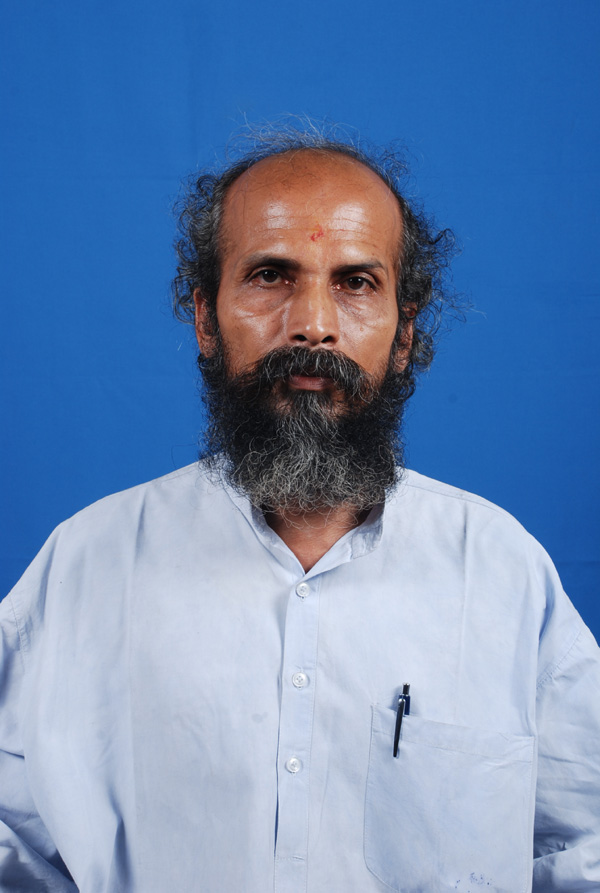
- Incumbent Pratap Chandra Sarangi
- Party: BJP
- Elected year: 2024

Balasore is a Lok Sabha parliamentary constituency in Odisha.

== Assembly Segments ==
Assembly Constituencies which constitute this Parliamentary Constituency, after delimitation of Parliamentary Constituencies and Legislative Assembly Constituencies of 2008 are:

#	Name	District	Member	Party	Leading (in 2024)
32	Badasahi (SC)	Mayurbhanj	Sanatan Bijuli	BJP	BJP
35	Jaleswar	Balasore	Ashwini Kumar Patra	BJD	BJP
36	Bhograi	Balasore	Goutam Buddha Das	BJD	BJD
37	Basta	Balasore	Subasini Jena	BJD	BJD
38	Balasore	Balasore	Manas Kumar Dutta	BJP	BJP
39	Remuna (SC)	Balasore	Gobinda Chandra Das	BJP	BJP
40	Nilgiri	Balasore	Santosh Khatua	BJP	BJP

== Elected members ==
Vote share of winning candidates
2024	45.49%
2019	41.74%
2014	31.75%
2009	24.73%
2004	58.37%
1999	55.68%
1998	53.17%
1996	52.9%
1991	44.08%
1989	56.27%
1984	56.55%
1980	59.09%
1977	55.74%
1971	37.97%

Since its formation in 1952, 18 elections have been held till date. It was a two member constituency for 1952 & 1957.

List of members elected from Balasore constituency are

Year	Member	Party
1952	Bhagabat Sahu	Indian National Congress
1957	Bhagabat Sahu	Indian National Congress
1962	Gokulananda Mohanty	Indian National Congress
1967	Samarendra Kundu	Praja Socialist Party
1971	Shyam Sunder Mahapatra	Indian National Congress
1977	Samarendra Kundu	Bharatiya Lok Dal
1980	Chintamani Jena	Indian National Congress (I)
1984	Chintamani Jena	Indian National Congress
1989	Samarendra Kundu	Janata Dal
1991	Kartik Mohapatra	Indian National Congress
1996	Kartik Mohapatra	Indian National Congress
1998	M. A. Kharabela Swain	Bharatiya Janata Party
1999	M. A. Kharabela Swain	Bharatiya Janata Party
2004	M. A. Kharabela Swain	Bharatiya Janata Party
2009	Srikant Kumar Jena	Indian National Congress
2014	Rabindra Kumar Jena	Biju Janata Dal
2019	Pratap Chandra Sarangi	Bharatiya Janata Party
2024	Pratap Chandra Sarangi	Bharatiya Janata Party

== Election results ==
=== 2024 ===
Voting were held on 1st June 2024 in 7th phase of Indian General Election. Counting of votes was on 4th June 2024. In 2024 election, Bharatiya Janata Party candidate Pratap Chandra Sarangi defeated Biju Janata Dal candidate Lekhashree Samantsinghar by a margin of 1,47,156 votes.

2024 Indian general election: Balasore
Party	Candidate	Votes	%	±%
BJP	Pratap Chandra Sarangi	563,865	45.49	▲3.7
BJD	Lekhashree Samantsinghar	4,16,709	33.62	▼7.0
INC	Srikant Kumar Jena	2,37,007	19.12	▲3.63
NOTA	None of the above	7,350	0.59	
Majority		1,47,156	11.87	
Turnout		12,40,999	77.08	
BJP hold				

=== 2019 ===
In 2019 election, Bharatiya Janata Party candidate Pratap Chandra Sarangi defeated Biju Janata Dal candidate Rabindra Kumar Jena by a margin of 12,956 votes.

2019 Indian general elections: Balasore
Party	Candidate	Votes	%	±%
BJP	Pratap Chandra Sarangi	483,858	41.79	▲13.98
BJD	Rabindra Kumar Jena	4,70,902	40.62	▼0.66
INC	Nabajyoti Patnaik	1,79,403	15.49	▼10.95
NOTA	None of the above	7,436	0.64	▼0.09
AITC	Haji Sk Abdul Istar	3,900	0.34	▼0.59
Majority		12,956	1.12	
Turnout		11,59,335	75.69	
BJP gain from BJD		Swing	▲7.32	

=== 2014 ===
In 2014 election, Biju Janata Dal candidate Rabindra Kumar Jena defeated Bharatiya Janata Party candidate Pratap Chandra Sarangi by a margin of 1,41,825 votes.

2014 Indian general elections: Balasore
Party	Candidate	Votes	%	±%
BJD	Rabindra Kumar Jena	433,768	41.33	
BJP	Pratap Chandra Sarangi	2,91,943	27.81	
INC	Srikant Kumar Jena	2,77,517	26.44	
CPI	Prashant Kumar Mishra	14,538	0.99	
AITC	Kartikeswar Patra	9,856	0.93	
NOTA	None of the above	7,716	0.73	
Majority		1,41,825	13.51	
Turnout		10,49,861	76.84	
Registered electors		13,66,218		
BJD gain from INC				

=== 2009 ===
In 2009 election, Indian National Congress candidate Srikant Kumar Jena defeated Nationalist Congress Party candidate Arun Dey by a margin of 38,900 votes.

2009 Indian general elections: Balasore
Party	Candidate	Votes	%	±%
INC	Srikant Kumar Jena	313,888	35.17	
NCP	Arun Dey	2,74,988	30.84	
BJP	M. A. Kharabela Swain	2,19,908	24.64	
JMM	Arun Jena	25,577	2.87	
Majority		38,900	4.36	
Turnout		8,92,263	70.29	
INC gain from BJP				
