= Samarendra Kundu =

Indian politician

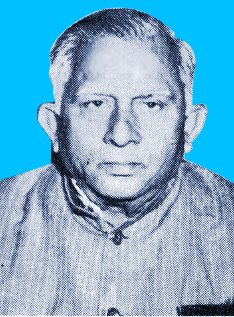

Member: 4th, 6th and 9th Lok Sabha
- Constituency: Balasore, Odisha

Union Minister of State, External Affairs
- In office August, 1977 – July, 1979

Personal details
- Born: 5 October 1930 Suelpur, Balasore, British India
- Died: 6 December 1993 (aged 63) New Delhi, India
- Party: Janata Dal
- Other political affiliations: Praja Socialist Party; Communist Party of India
- Spouse: Dipti Biswal Kundu
- Parent: Sitanath Kundu (father)
- Education: B. Sc, LL.B
- Alma mater: Ravenshaw University, Madhusudan Law University

Samarendra Kundu (5 October 1930 - 6 December 1993) was an Indian politician and a former Union minister of state of foreign affairs in the Government of India. He was elected to the 4th Lok Sabha in 1967 from Balasore in Orissa. He was re-elected to the Lok Sabha in 1977 and 1989 from the same constituency. He was a member of the Janata Dal political party. He was imprisoned during The Emergency in 1975–77, under MISA. He died in 1993 of complications relating to an operation.
