= Sonkar (surname) =

सोनकर
- Language: Hindi

Origin
- Language: Sanskrit
- Region of origin: Indian subcontinent

This is a list of people bearing the surname Sonkar.

== Indian politicians ==
=== Member of Parliament ===
- Bizay Sonkar Shastri, Former Member of Parliament and current BJP spokesperson
- Neelam Sonkar, 16th Lok Sabha
- Rajnath Sonkar Shastri, Member of Parliament, Loksabha (1980-1984)
- Ram Raj Sonkar, known as Udit Raj, Member of Parliament in the Lok Sabha
- Vinod Sonkar, Member of the Lok Sabha since 2014

=== Member of Legislative Assembly ===
- Anchal Sonkar, member of the 2013 Legislative Assembly of India
- Banke Lal Sonkar, member of 13th Legislative Assembly
- Bheem Prasad Sonkar, Member of Uttar Pradesh Legislative Assembly
- Jagdish Sonkar, Member of Uttar Pradesh Legislative Assembly
- Kailash Nath Sonkar, Member of Uttar Pradesh Legislative Assembly
- Prakash Sonkar, Former Member of Madhya Pradesh Legislative Assembly
- Rajesh Sonkar, Member of Madhya Pradesh Legislative Assembly
- Ravi Kumar Sonkar, Member of Uttar Pradesh Legislative Assembly
- Shriram Sonkar, member of 11th, 13th, and 17th Legislative Assembly
- Vidyasagar Sonkar, Member of Uttar Pradesh Legislative Council
- Deep Chandra Sonkar, Former Member of Shahganj Legislative Assembly
- Saroj Sonkar, MLA, She won Balha Assembly Constituency by 89627 votes in 2019 Sub-election.

== Entertainment ==
- Pinki Sonkar, featured in Smile Pinki (2008), a 39-minute documentary directed by Megan Mylan. The documentary won the 81st Academy Awards for Best Documentary.

== Sports person ==
- Barkha Sonkar, International basketball player, member of India women's national basketball team and represented India in 2017 FIBA WOMEN'S ASIA CUP DIVISION B.
