= List of members of the 10th Lok Sabha =

Members of Lok Sabha (1991-96)

This is a list of members of the 10th Lok Sabha arranged by state or territory represented. These members of the lower house of the Indian Parliament were elected to the 10th Lok Sabha (1991 to 1996) at the 1991 Indian general election.

== Andaman and Nicobar Islands ==
Constituency	Type	Name of Elected M.P.	Party affiliation
Andaman and Nicobar Islands	GEN	Manoranjan Bhakta	Indian National Congress

== Chandigarh ==
Constituency	Type	Name of Elected M.P.	Party affiliation
Chandigarh	GEN	Pawan Kumar Bansal	Indian National Congress

== Dadra and Nagar Haveli ==
Constituency	Type	Name of Elected M.P.	Party affiliation
Dadra and Nagar Haveli	ST	Mohanbhai Sanjibhai Delkar	Indian National Congress

== Daman and Diu ==
Constituency	Type	Name of Elected M.P.	Party affiliation
Daman and Diu	GEN	Devjibhai Tandel	Bharatiya Janata Party

== Delhi ==
No.	Constituency	Type	Name of Elected M.P.	Party affiliation
1	New Delhi	GEN	Lal Krishna Advani	Bharatiya Janata Party
1	New Delhi	GEN	Rajesh Khanna(By poll)	Indian National Congress
2	South Delhi	GEN	Madan Lal Khurana	Bharatiya Janata Party
3	Outer Delhi	GEN	Sajjan Kumar	Indian National Congress
4	East Delhi	GEN	Baikunth Lal Sharma	Bharatiya Janata Party
5	Chandni Chowk	GEN	Tarachand Khandelwal	Bharatiya Janata Party
6	Delhi Sadar	GEN	Jagdish Tytler	Indian National Congress
7	Karol Bagh	SC	Kalka Dass	Bharatiya Janata Party

== Lakshadweep ==
Constituency	Type	Name of Elected M.P.	Party affiliation
Lakshadweep	ST	P.M. Sayeed	Indian National Congress

== Puducherry ==
Constituency	Type	Name of Elected M.P.	Party affiliation
Pondicherry	GEN	M. O. H. Farook	Indian National Congress

== Andhra Pradesh ==
Keys: INC (27) TDP (11) CPI (1) AIMIM (1) BJP (1) CPI(M) (1)

No.	Constituency	Type	Name of Elected M.P.	Party affiliation
1	Srikakulam	GEN	Dr.Kanithi Viswanatham	Indian National Congress
2	Parvathipuram	ST	Vijayarama Raju Satrucharla	Indian National Congress
3	Bobbili	GEN	Poosapati Ananda Gajapathi Raju	Indian National Congress
4	Visakhapatnam	GEN	Dr. M.V.V.S Murthi	Telugu Desam Party
5	Bhadrachalam	ST	Kamala Kumari Karredula	Indian National Congress
6	Anakapalli	GEN	Konathala Ramakrishna	Indian National Congress
7	Kakinada	GEN	Thota Subbarao	Telugu Desam Party
8	Rajahmundry	GEN	Dr. K.V.R.Choudhary	Telugu Desam Party
9	Amalapuram	SC	G. M. C. Balayogi	Telugu Desam Party
10	Narasapur	GEN	Bhupathiraju Vijayakumar Raju	Telugu Desam Party
11	Eluru	GEN	Bolla Bulli Ramaiah	Telugu Desam Party
12	Machilipatnam	GEN	Kolusu Peda Reddaiah Yadav	Telugu Desam Party
13	Vijayawada	GEN	V. Sobhanadreeswara Rao	Telugu Desam Party
14	Tenali	GEN	Prof. Ummareddy Venkateswarlu	Telugu Desam Party
15	Guntur	GEN	S. M. Laljan Basha	Telugu Desam Party
16	Bapatla	GEN	Daggubati Venkateswara Rao	Telugu Desam Party
17	Narasaraopet	GEN	K. V. Krishna Reddy	Indian National Congress
18	Ongole	GEN	M. Subbarama Reddy	Indian National Congress
19	Nellore	SC	Padmashree Kudumula	Indian National Congress
20	Tirupathi	SC	Dr.Chinta Mohan	Indian National Congress
21	Chittoor	GEN	M. Gyanendra Reddy	Indian National Congress
22	Rajampet	GEN	Sai Prathap Annayyagari	Indian National Congress
23	Cuddapah	GEN	Y. S. Rajasekhar Reddy	Indian National Congress
24	Hindupur	GEN	S. Gangadhar	Indian National Congress
25	Anantapur	GEN	Anantha Venkatarami Reddy	Indian National Congress
26	Kurnool	GEN	Kotla Vijaya Bhaskara Reddy	Indian National Congress
26	Kurnool	GEN	Kotla Jayasurya Prakasha Reddy (By Poll)	Indian National Congress
27	Nandyal	GEN	Gangula Prathap Reddy	Indian National Congress
28	Nagarkurnool	SC	Mallu Ravi	Indian National Congress
29	Mahabubnagar	GEN	Mallikarjun Goud	Indian National Congress
30	Hyderabad	GEN	Sultan Salahuddin Owaisi	All India Majlis-e-Ittehadul Muslimeen
31	Secunderabad	GEN	Bandaru Dattatreya	Bharatiya Janta Party
32	Siddipet	SC	Nandi Yellaiah	Indian National Congress
33	Medak	GEN	M. Baga Reddy	Indian National Congress
34	Nizamabad	GEN	Gaddam Ganga Reddy	Telugu Desam Party
35	Adilabad	GEN	Allola Indrakaran Reddy	Telugu Desam Party
36	Peddapalli	SC	G. Venkat Swamy	Indian National Congress
37	Karimnagar	GEN	Juvvadi Chokka Rao	Indian National Congress
38	Hanamkonda	GEN	Kamaluddin Ahmed	Indian National Congress
39	Warangal	GEN	Surendra Reddy	Indian National Congress
40	Khammam	GEN	P. V. Rangayya Naidu	Indian National Congress
41	Nalgonda	GEN	Bommagani Dharma Bhiksham	Communist Party of India
42	Miryalguda	GEN	Bhim Narsinha Reddy	Communist Party of India

== Arunachal Pradesh ==
Keys: INC (2)

No.	Constituency	Type	Name of Elected M.P.	Party affiliation
1	Arunachal West	GEN	Laeta Umbrey	Indian National Congress
2	Arunachal East	GEN	Prem Khandu Thungon	Indian National Congress

== Assam ==
Keys: INC (8) BJP (2) CPI(M) (2) AGP (1) Independent (1)

No.	Constituency	Type	Name of Elected M.P.	Party affiliation
1	Karimganj	SC	Dwaraka Nath Das	Bharatiya Janta Party
2	Silchar	GEN	Kabindra Purkayastha	Bharatiya Janta Party
3	Autonomous District	ST	Dr. Jayanta Rongpi	Autonomous State Demand Committee
4	Dhubri	GEN	Nurul Islam	Indian National Congress
5	Kokrajhar	ST	Satyendra Nath Brohmo Chaudhury	Independent
6	Barpeta	GEN	Uddabh Berman	Communist Party of India
7	Gauhati	GEN	Kirip Chaliha	Indian National Congress
8	Mangaldoi	GEN	Probin Deka	Indian National Congress
9	Tezpur	GEN	Swarup Upadhyay	Indian National Congress
10	Nowgong	GEN	Muhi Ram Saikia	Asom Gana Parishad
11	Kaliabor	GEN	Tarun Gogoi	Indian National Congress
12	Jorhat	GEN	Bijoy Krishna Handique	Indian National Congress
13	Dibrugarh	GEN	Paban Singh Ghatowar	Indian National Congress
14	Lakhimpur	GEN	Balin Kuli	Indian National Congress

== Bihar ==
JD (32) CPI (8) BJP (5) JMM (5) INC (1) CPM (1) SAP (1) Ind (1)

Constituency		Member	Party
#	Name	Member	Party
1	Bagaha (SC)	Mahendra Baitha	JD
2	Bettiah	Faiyazul Azam	JD
3	Motihari	Kamla Mishra Madhukar	CPI
4	Gopalganj	Abdul Ghafoor	JD
5	Siwan	Brishin Patel	JD
6	Maharajganj	Girija Devi	JD
7	Chhapra	Lal Babu Rai	JD
8	Hajipur (SC)	Ram Sundar Das	JD
9	Vaishali	Shiva Sharan Singh	JD
9	Vaishali	Lovely Anand^	SAP
10	Muzaffarpur	George Fernandes	JD
11	Sitamarhi	Nawal Kishore Rai	JD
12	Sheohar	Hari Kishore Singh	JD
13	Madhubani	Bhogendra Jha	CPI
14	Jhanjharpur	Devendra Prasad Yadav	JD
15	Darbhanga	Ali Ashraf Fatmi	JD
16	Rosera (SC)	Ram Vilas Paswan	JD
17	Samastipur	Manjay Lal	JD
18	Barh	Nitish Kumar	JD
19	Balia	Surya Narayan Singh	CPI
20	Saharsa	Sury Narayan Yadav	JD
21	Madhepura	Sharad Yadav	JD
22	Araria	Sukdeo Paswan	JD
23	Kishanganj	Syed Shahabuddin	JD
24	Purnia	Pappu Yadav	Ind
25	Katihar	Yunus Saleem	JD
26	Rajmahal (ST)	Simon Marandi	JMM
27	Dumka (ST)	Shibu Soren	JMM
28	Godda	Suraj Mandal	JMM
29	Banka	Pratap Singh	JD
30	Bhagalpur	Chunchun Prasad Yadav	JD
31	Khagaria	Ram Sharan Yadav	JD
32	Munger	Brahmanand Mandal	CPI
33	Begusarai	Krishna Sahi	INC
34	Nalanda	Vijay Kumar Yadav	CPI
35	Patna	Ram Kripal Yadav	JD
36	Arrah	Ram Lakhan Yadav	JD
37	Buxar	Tej Narayan Singh	CPI
38	Sasaram (SC)	Chhedi Paswan	JD
39	Bikramganj	Ram Prasad Singh	JD
40	Aurangabad	Ram Naresh Singh	JD
41	Jahanabad	Ramashray Prasad Singh	CPM
42	Nawada	Prem Chand Ram	CPI
43	Gaya	Rajesh Kumar Manjhi	JD
44	Chatra	Upendra Nath Verma	JD
45	Koderma	Mumtaz Ansari	JD
46	Giridih	Binod Bihari Mahato	JMM
47	Dhanbad	Rita Verma	BJP
48	Hazaribagh	Bhubneshwar Prasad Mehta	CPI
49	Ranchi	Ram Tahal Choudhary	BJP
50	Jamshedpur	Shailendra Mahato	JD
51	Singhbhum (ST)	Krishna Marandi	JMM
52	Khunti (ST)	Kariya Munda	BJP
53	Lohardaga (ST)	Lalit Oraon	BJP
54	Palamu (SC)	Ram Deo Ram	BJP

== Goa ==
No.	Constituency	Type	Name of Elected M.P.	Party affiliation
1	Mormugao	GEN	Eduardo Faleiro	Indian National Congress
2	Panaji	GEN	Harish Narayan Prabhu Zantye	Indian National Congress

== Gujarat ==
No.	Constituency	Type	Name of Elected M.P.	Party affiliation
1	Kutch	GEN	Babubhai Shah	Indian National Congress
2	Surendranagar	GEN	Somabhai Gandalal Koli Patel	Bharatiya Janata Party
3	Jamnagar	GEN	Chandresh Patel Kordia	Bharatiya Janata Party
4	Rajkot	GEN	Shivlal Vekaria	Bharatiya Janata Party
5	Porbandar	GEN	Harilal Madhavjibhai Patel	Bharatiya Janata Party
6	Junagadh	GEN	Bhavna Chikhalia	Bharatiya Janata Party
7	Amreli	GEN	Dileep Sanghani	Bharatiya Janata Party
8	Bhavnagar	GEN	Mahavir Singh Gohil	Bharatiya Janata Party
9	Dhandhuka	SC	Ratilal Kalidas Varma	Bharatiya Janata Party
10	Ahmedabad	GEN	Harin Pathak	Bharatiya Janata Party
11	Gandhinagar	GEN	Lal Krishna Advani	Bharatiya Janata Party
12	Mehsana	GEN	A.K. Patel	Bharatiya Janata Party
13	Patan	SC	Mahesh Kanodia	Bharatiya Janata Party
14	Banaskantha	GEN	Harisinh Pratapsinh Chavda	Bharatiya Janata Party
15	Sabarkantha	GEN	Arvind Trivedi	Bharatiya Janata Party
16	Kapadvanj	GEN	Gabhaji Mangaji Thakor	Bharatiya Janata Party
17	Dohad	ST	Damor Somjibhai Punjabhai	Indian National Congress
18	Godhra	GEN	Shankersinh Vaghela	Bharatiya Janata Party
19	Kaira	GEN	Khushiram Jeswani	Bharatiya Janata Party
20	Anand	GEN	Ishwarbhai Chavda	Indian National Congress
21	Chhota Udaipur	ST	Naranbhai Rathwa	Indian National Congress
22	Baroda	GEN	Dipika Topiwala	Bharatiya Janata Party
23	Broach	GEN	Chandubhai Deshmukh	Bharatiya Janata Party
24	Surat	GEN	Kashiram Rana	Bharatiya Janata Party
25	Mandvi	ST	Chhitubhai Gamit	Indian National Congress
26	Bulsar	ST	Uttambhai Harjibhai Patel	Indian National Congress

== Haryana ==
No.	Constituency	Type	Name of Elected M.P.	Party affiliation
1	Ambala	SC	Ram Prakash Chaudhary	Indian National Congress
2	Kurukshetra	GEN	Tara Singh	Indian National Congress
3	Karnal	GEN	Chiranji Lal Sharma	Indian National Congress
4	Sonepat	GEN	Dharam Pal Singh Malik	Indian National Congress
5	Rohtak	GEN	Bhupinder Singh Hooda	Indian National Congress
6	Faridabad	GEN	Avtar Singh Bhadana	Indian National Congress
7	Mahendragarh	GEN	Rao Ram Singh	Indian National Congress
8	Bhiwani	GEN	Jangbir Singh	Haryana Vikas Party
9	Hissar	GEN	Narain Singh	Indian National Congress
10	Sirsa	SC	Selja Kumari	Indian National Congress

== Himachal Pradesh ==
No.	Constituency	Type	Name of Elected M.P.	Party affiliation
1	Simla	SC	Krishan Dutt Sultanpuri	Indian National Congress
2	Mandi	GEN	Sukh Ram	Indian National Congress
3	Kangra	GEN	D. D. Khanoria	Bharatiya Janata Party
4	Hamirpur	GEN	Prem Kumar Dhumal	Bharatiya Janata Party

== Karnataka ==
No.	Constituency	Type	Name of Elected M.P.	Party affiliation
1	Bidar	SC	Ramchandra Veerappa	Bharatiya Janata Party
2	Gulbarga	GEN	Basawaraj Jawali	Indian National Congress
3	Raichur	GEN	Venkatesh Naik	Indian National Congress
4	Koppal	GEN	Basavaraj Patil Anwari	Indian National Congress
5	Bellary	GEN	Basavarajeshwari	Indian National Congress
6	Davangere	GEN	Channaiah Odeyar	Indian National Congress
7	Chitradurga	GEN	C. P. Mudalagiriyappa	Indian National Congress
8	Tumkur	GEN	S. Mallikarjunaiah	Bharatiya Janata Party
9	Chikballapur	GEN	V. Krishna Rao	Indian National Congress
10	Kolar	SC	K.H. Muniyappa	Indian National Congress
11	Kanakapura	GEN	M. V. Chandrashekara Murthy	Indian National Congress
12	Bangalore North	GEN	C. K. Jaffer Sharief	Indian National Congress
13	Bangalore South	GEN	K. Venkatagiri Gowda	Bharatiya Janata Party
14	Mandya	GEN	G. Made Gowda	Indian National Congress
15	Chamarajanagar	SC	Srinivasa Prasad	Indian National Congress
16	Mysore	GEN	Chandraprabha Urs	Indian National Congress
17	Mangalore	GEN	Dhananjay Kumar	Bharatiya Janata Party
18	Udupi	GEN	Oscar Fernandes	Indian National Congress
19	Hassan	GEN	H. D. Deve Gowda	Janata Dal
20	Chikmagalur	GEN	Taradevi Siddhartha	Indian National Congress
21	Shimoga	GEN	K. G. Shivappa	Indian National Congress
22	Kanara	GEN	G. Devaraya Naik	Indian National Congress
23	Dharwad South	GEN	B. M. Mujahid	Indian National Congress
24	Dharwad North	GEN	D. K. Naikar	Indian National Congress
25	Belgaum	GEN	Sidnal Shanmukhappa Basappa	Indian National Congress
26	Chikkodi	SC	B. Shankaranand	Indian National Congress
27	Bagalkot	GEN	Siddu Nyamagouda	Indian National Congress
28	Bijapur	GEN	Basagondappa Gudadinni	Indian National Congress

== Kerala ==
No.	Constituency	Type	Name of Elected M.P.	Party affiliation
1	Kasaragod	GEN	M. Ramanna Rai	Communist Party of India
2	Cannanore	GEN	Mullappally Ramachandran	Indian National Congress
3	Vatakara	GEN	K. P. Unnikrishnan	Indian Congress (Socialist) – Sarat Chandra Sinha
4	Calicut	GEN	K. Muraleedharan	Indian National Congress
5	Manjeri	GEN	E. Ahamed	Muslim League Kerala State Committee
6	Ponnani	GEN	Ebrahim Sulaiman Sait	Muslim League Kerala State Committee
7	Palghat	GEN	V. S. Vijayaraghavan	Indian National Congress
8	Ottapalam	SC	K.R. Narayanan	Indian National Congress
8	Ottapalam	SC	S. Sivararaman (By Poll)	Communist Party of India
9	Trichur	GEN	P. C. Chacko	Indian National Congress
10	Mukundapuram	GEN	Savithri Lakshmanan	Indian National Congress
11	Ernakulam	GEN	K. V. Thomas	Indian National Congress
12	Muvattupuzha	GEN	P. C. Thomas	Kerala Congress
13	Kottayam	GEN	Ramesh Chennithala	Indian National Congress
14	Idukki	GEN	Palai K.M. Mathew	Indian National Congress
15	Alleppey	GEN	T. J. Anjalose	Communist Party of India
16	Mavelikara	GEN	P. J. Kurien	Indian National Congress
17	Adoor	SC	Kodikunnil Suresh	Indian National Congress
18	Quilon	GEN	S. Krishna Kumar	Indian National Congress
19	Chirayinkil	GEN	Suseela Gopalan	Communist Party of India
20	Trivandrum	GEN	A. Charles	Indian National Congress

== Madhya Pradesh ==
No.	Constituency	Type	Name of Elected M.P.	Party affiliation
1	Morena	SC	Barelal Jatav	Indian National Congress
2	Bhind	GEN	Yoganand Saraswati	Bharatiya Janata Party
3	Gwalior	GEN	Madhavrao Scindia	Indian National Congress
4	Guna	GEN	Rajmata Vijayraje Scindia	Bharatiya Janata Party
5	Sagar	SC	Anand Ahirwar	Indian National Congress
6	Khajuraho	GEN	Uma Bharti	Bharatiya Janata Party
7	Damoh	GEN	Dr. Ramakrishna Kusmaria	Bharatiya Janata Party
8	Satna	GEN	Arjun Singh	Indian National Congress
9	Rewa	GEN	Bheem Singh Patel	BSP
10	Sidhi	ST	Motilal Singh	Indian National Congress
11	Shahdol	ST	Dalbir Singh	Indian National Congress
12	Surguja	ST	Khelsai Singh	Indian National Congress
13	Raigarh	ST	Pushpa Devi Singh	Indian National Congress
14	Janjgir	GEN	Bhawani Lal Verma	Indian National Congress
15	Bilaspur	SC	Khelan Ram Jangde	Indian National Congress
16	Sarangarh	SC	Paras Ram Bhardwaj	Indian National Congress
17	Raipur	GEN	Vidya Charan Shukla	Indian National Congress
18	Mahasamund	GEN	Pawan Diwan	Indian National Congress
19	Kanker	ST	Arvind Netam	Indian National Congress
20	Bastar	ST	Manku Ram Sodhi	Indian National Congress
21	Durg	GEN	Chandulal Chandrakar	Indian National Congress
22	Rajnandgaon	GEN	Shivendra Bahadur Singh	Indian National Congress
23	Balaghat	GEN	Vishweshwar Bhagat	Indian National Congress
24	Mandla	ST	Mohan Lal Jhikram	Indian National Congress
25	Jabalpur	GEN	Shravan Kumar Patel	Indian National Congress
26	Seoni	GEN	Vimla Varma	Indian National Congress
27	Chhindwara	GEN	Kamal Nath	Indian National Congress
28	Betul	GEN	Aslam Sher Khan	Indian National Congress
29	Hoshangabad	GEN	Sartaj Singh	Bharatiya Janata Party
30	Bhopal	GEN	Sushil Chandra Verma	Bharatiya Janata Party
31	Vidisha	GEN	Atal Bihari Vajpayee	Bharatiya Janata Party
32	Rajgarh	GEN	Digvijay Singh	Indian National Congress
33	Shajapur	SC	Phool Chand Verma	Bharatiya Janata Party
34	Khandwa	GEN	Mahendra Kumar Singh	Indian National Congress
35	Khargone	GEN	Rameshwar Patidar	Bharatiya Janata Party
36	Dhar	ST	Suraj Bhanu Solanki	Indian National Congress
37	Indore	GEN	Sumitra Mahajan	Bharatiya Janata Party
38	Ujjain	SC	Satyanarayan Jatiya	Bharatiya Janata Party
39	Jhabua	ST	Dileep Singh Bhuria	Indian National Congress
40	Mandsaur	GEN	Dr. Laxminarayan Pandey	Bharatiya Janata Party

== Maharashtra ==
No.	Constituency	Type	Name of Elected M.P.	Party affiliation
1	Rajapur	GEN	Sudhir Sawant	Indian National Congress
2	Ratnagiri	GEN	Govind Rao Nikam	Indian National Congress
3	Kolaba	GEN	A. R. Antulay	Indian National Congress
4	Bombay South	GEN	Murli Deora	Indian National Congress
5	Bombay South Central	GEN	Mohan Rawale	Shiv Sena
6	Bombay North Central	GEN	Sharad Dighe	Indian National Congress
7	Bombay North East	GEN	Gurudas Kamat	Indian National Congress
8	Bombay North West	GEN	Sunil Dutt	Indian National Congress
9	Bombay North	GEN	Ram Naik	Bharatiya Janata Party
10	Thane	GEN	Ram Kapse	Bharatiya Janata Party
11	Dahanu	ST	Damodar Barku Shingada	Indian National Congress
12	Nashik	GEN	Vasant Pawar	Indian National Congress
13	Malegaon	ST	Zamru Manglu Kahandole	Indian National Congress
14	Dhule	ST	Bapu Hari Chaure	Indian National Congress
15	Nandurbar	ST	Manikrao Hodlya Gavit	Indian National Congress
16	Erandol	GEN	Vijaykumar Naval Patil	Indian National Congress
17	Jalgaon	GEN	Gunwantrao Sarode	Bharatiya Janata Party
18	Buldhana	SC	Mukul Balkrishna Wasnik	Indian National Congress
19	Akola	GEN	Pandurang Pundalik Fundkar	Bharatiya Janata Party
20	Washim	GEN	Anantrao Vithhalrao Deshmukh	Indian National Congress
21	Amravati	GEN	Pratibha Devisingh Patil	Indian National Congress
22	Ramtek	GEN	Raje Tejsingh Rao Bhonsle	Indian National Congress
23	Nagpur	GEN	Datta Meghe	Indian National Congress
24	Bhandara	GEN	Praful Patel	Indian National Congress
25	Chimur	GEN	Vilas Muttemwar	Indian National Congress
26	Chandrapur	GEN	Shantaram Potdukhe	Indian National Congress
27	Wardha	GEN	Ramchandra Ghangare	Indian National Congress
28	Yavatmal	GEN	Uttamrao Deorao Patil	Indian National Congress
29	Hingoli	GEN	Vilasrao Gundewar	Shiv Sena
30	Nanded	GEN	Suryakanta Patil	Indian National Congress
31	Parbhani	GEN	Ashokrao Anandrao Deshmukh	Shiv Sena
32	Jalna	GEN	Ankushrao Tope	Indian National Congress
33	Aurangabad	GEN	Moreshwar Save	Shiv Sena
34	Beed	GEN	Kesharbai Kshirsagar	Indian National Congress
35	Latur	GEN	Shivraj Patil	Indian National Congress
36	Osmanabad	SC	Arvind Kamble	Indian National Congress
37	Solapur	GEN	Dharmanna Sadul	Indian National Congress
38	Pandharpur	SC	Sandipan Thorat	Indian National Congress
39	Ahmednagar	GEN	Yashwantrao Gadakh Patil	Indian National Congress
39	Ahmednagar	GEN	Maruti Shelke (By Poll)	Indian National Congress
40	Kopargaon	GEN	Shankarrao Kale	Indian National Congress
41	Khed	GEN	Vidura Nawale	Indian National Congress
42	Pune	GEN	Anna Joshi	Bharatiya Janata Party
43	Baramati	GEN	Ajit Pawar	Indian National Congress
43	Baramati	GEN	Sharad Pawar (1991)	Indian National Congress
43	Baramati	GEN	Bapusaheb Thite (1994)	Indian National Congress
44	Satara	GEN	Prataprao Baburao Bhosale	Indian National Congress
45	Karad	GEN	Prithviraj Chavan	Indian National Congress
46	Sangli	GEN	Prakashbapu Vasantdada Patil	Indian National Congress
47	Ichalkaranji	GEN	Balasaheb Shankarrao Mane	Indian National Congress
48	Kolhapur	GEN	Udaysingrao Gaikwad	Indian National Congress

== Manipur ==
No.	Constituency	Type	Name of Elected M.P.	Party affiliation
1	Inner Manipur	GEN	Yumnam Yaima Singh	Manipur People's Party
2	Outer Manipur	ST	Meijinlung Kamson	Indian National Congress

== Meghalaya ==
No.	Constituency	Type	Name of Elected M.P.	Party affiliation
1	Shillong	GEN	Peter G. Marbaniang	Indian National Congress
2	Tura	ST	P.A. Sangma	Indian National Congress

== Mizoram ==
Constituency	Type	Name of Elected M.P.	Party affiliation
Mizoram	ST	Dr. C. Silvera	Indian National Congress

== Nagaland ==
Constituency	Type	Name of Elected M.P.	Party affiliation
Nagaland	GEN	Imchalemba	Indian National Congress

== Odisha ==
No.	Constituency	Type	Name of Elected M.P.	Party affiliation
1	Mayurbhanj	ST	Bhagey Gobardhan	Indian National Congress
2	Balasore	GEN	Kartik Mohapatra	Indian National Congress
3	Bhadrak	SC	Arjun Charan Sethi	Janata Dal
4	Jajpur	SC	Anadi Charan Das	Janata Dal
5	Kendrapara	GEN	Rabi Ray	Janata Dal
6	Cuttack	GEN	Srikant Kumar Jena	Janata Dal
7	Jagatsinghpur	GEN	Lokanath Choudhary	Communist Party of India
8	Puri	GEN	Braja Kishore Tripathy	Janata Dal
9	Bhubaneswar	GEN	Sivaji Patnaik	Communist Party of India
10	Aska	GEN	Ramchandra Rath	Indian National Congress
11	Berhampur	GEN	Gopinath Gajapati	Indian National Congress
12	Koraput	ST	Giridhar Gamang	Indian National Congress
13	Nowrangpur	ST	Khagapati Pradhani	Indian National Congress
14	Kalahandi	GEN	Subash Chandra Nayak	Indian National Congress
15	Phulbani	SC	Mrutyunjaya Nayak	Indian National Congress
16	Bolangir	GEN	Sarat Pattanayak	Indian National Congress
17	Sambalpur	GEN	Krupasindhu Bhoi	Indian National Congress
18	Deogarh	GEN	Sriballav Panigrahi	Indian National Congress
19	Dhenkanal	GEN	Kamakhya Prasad Singh Deo	Indian National Congress
20	Sundargarh	ST	Frida Topno	Indian National Congress
21	Keonjhar	ST	Govind Chandra Munda	Janata Dal

== Punjab ==
No.	Constituency	Type	Name of Elected M.P.	Party affiliation
1	Gurdaspur	GEN	Sukhbans Kaur Bhinder	Indian National Congress
2	Amritsar	GEN	Raghunandan Lal Bhatia	Indian National Congress
3	Tarn Taran	GEN	Surinder Singh Kairon	Indian National Congress
4	Jullundur	GEN	Yash	Indian National Congress
4	Jullundur	GEN	Umrao Singh (By Poll)	Indian National Congress
5	Phillaur	SC	Santosh Chowdhary	Indian National Congress
6	Hoshiarpur	GEN	Kamal Chaudhry	Indian National Congress
7	Ropar	SC	Harchand Singh	Indian National Congress
8	Patiala	GEN	Sant Ram Singla	Indian National Congress
9	Ludhiana	GEN	Gurcharan Singh Galib	Indian National Congress
10	Sangrur	GEN	Gurcharan Singh Dadhahoor	Indian National Congress
11	Bhatinda	SC	Kewal Singh	Indian National Congress
12	Faridkot	GEN	Jagmeet Singh Brar	Indian National Congress
13	Ferozepur	GEN	Mohan Singh	Bahujan Samaj Party

== Rajasthan ==
INC (13) BJP (12)

Constituency		Member	Party
#	Name	Member	Party
1	Ganganagar (SC)	Birbal Ram	INC
2	Bikaner	Manphool Singh Chaudhary	INC
3	Churu	Ram Singh Kaswan	BJP
4	Jhunjhunu	Mohd. Ayub Khan	INC
5	Sikar	Balram Jakhar	INC
6	Jaipur	Girdhari Lal Bhargava	BJP
7	Dausa	Rajesh Pilot	INC
8	Alwar	Mahendra Kumari	BJP
9	Bharatpur	Krishnendra Kaur	BJP
10	Bayana (SC)	Ganga Ram Koli	BJP
11	Sawai Madhopur (ST)	Kunji Lal Meena	BJP
12	Ajmer	Rasa Singh Rawat	BJP
13	Tonk (SC)	Ram Narain Bairwa	BJP
14	Kota	Dau Dayal Joshi	BJP
15	Jhalawar	Vasundhara Raje	BJP
16	Banswara (ST)	Prabhu Lal Rawat	INC
17	Salumber (ST)	Bheru Lal Meena	INC
18	Udaipur	Girija Vyas	INC
19	Chittorgarh	Jaswant Singh	BJP
20	Bhilwara	Shiv Charan Mathur	INC
21	Pali	Guman Mal Lodha	BJP
22	Jalore (SC)	Buta Singh	INC
23	Barmer	Ram Niwas Mirdha	INC
24	Jodhpur	Ashok Gehlot	INC
25	Nagaur	Nathuram Mirdha	INC

== Sikkim ==
Constituency	Type	Name of Elected M.P.	Party affiliation
Sikkim	GEN	Dil Kumari Bhandari	Sikkim Sangram Parishad

== Tamil Nadu ==
Constituency	Member	Party
Arakkonam	Rangaswamy Jeevarathinam	Indian National Congress (I)
Arani	M. Krishnasswamy	Indian National Congress
Chengalpattu	S.S.R. Rajendra Kumar	All India Anna Dravida Munnetra Kazhagam
Chidambaram (SC)	Dr. P. Vallal Peruman	Indian National Congress (I)
Coimbatore	C.K. Kuppuswamy	Indian National Congress (I)
Cuddalore	P.P. Kaliaperumal	Indian National Congress (I)
Dindigul	C. Sreenivaasan	All India Anna Dravida Munnetra Kazhagam
Gobichettipalayam	P.G. Narayanan	All India Anna Dravida Munnetra Kazhagam
Karur	Dr. N. Murugesan	All India Anna Dravida Munnetra Kazhagam
Madras Central	Era Anbarasu	Indian National Congress (I)
Madras North	D. Pandian	Indian National Congress (I)
Madras South	Dr. R. Sridharan	All India Anna Dravida Munnetra Kazhagam
Madurai	A. Govindarajalu Subbaraman Rambabu	Tamil Manila Congress (Moopanar)
Mayiladuthurai	Mani Shankar Aiyar	Indian National Congress
Nagapattinam (SC)	Dr. Padma	Indian National Congress (I)
Nagercoil	N. Dennis	Tamil Manila Congress (Moopanar)
Nilgiris (SC)	R. Prabhu	Indian National Congress
Palani	Palaniyappa Gounder Kumarasamy	All India Anna Dravida Munnetra Kazhagam
Palani	Senapathi A. Gounder	Indian National Congress (I)
Perambalur (SC)	A. Ashokaraj	All India Anna Dravida Munnetra Kazhagam
Periyakulam	R. Ramasamy	All India Anna Dravida Munnetra Kazhagam
Pollachi (SC)	B. Raja Ravi Varma	All India Anna Dravida Munnetra Kazhagam
Pudukkottai	N. Sundararaj	Indian National Congress (I)
Ramanathapuram	Dr. Vadivelu Rajeshwaran	Indian National Congress (I)
Rasipuram (SC)	B. Devarajan	Indian National Congress (I)
Salem	K.V. Thangka Balu	Indian National Congress
Salem	Vazhappady Koothappadayachi Ramamurthy	Independent
Sivaganga	Palaniappan Chidambaram	Indian National Congress
Sivakasi	R. Kanaga Govinda Rajulu	All India Anna Dravida Munnetra Kazhagam
Sriperumbudur (SC)	Maragatham Chandrasekar	Indian National Congress (I)
Tenkasi (SC)	Mookaiah Arunachalam	Tamil Manila Congress (Moopanar)
Thanjavur	Krishnasami Thulasiah Vandayar	Indian National Congress (I)
Thindivanam	K. Ramamurthee Thindivanam	Indian National Congress (I)
Tiruchengode	Dr. K. S. Soundaram	All India Anna Dravida Munnetra Kazhagam
Tiruchirappalli	Lourdusamy Adaikalaraj	Tamil Manila Congress (Moopanar)
Tiruchirappalli	P. R. Kumaramangalam	Bharatiya Janata Party
Tirunelveli	Dhanuskodi Athithan	Indian National Congress
Tirunelveli	M.R. Kadambur Janarthanan	All India Anna Dravida Munnetra Kazhagam
Tirupattur	Adikesavan Jayamohan	Indian National Congress (I)
Vellore	B. Akber Pasha	Indian National Congress (I)

== Telangana ==
Constituency	Member	Party
Nagarkurnool (SC)	Nandi Yellaiah	Indian National Congress
Secunderabad	Bandaru Dattatreya	Bharatiya Janata Party

== Tripura ==
Constituency	Member	Party
Tripura East (ST)	Maharani Bibhu Kumari Devi	Indian National Congress (I)

== Uttar Pradesh ==
BJP (52) JD (22) INC (5) JP (4) BSP (1) CPI (1)

Constituency		Member	Party
#	Name	Member	Party
1	Tehri Garhwal	Manabendra Shah	BJP
2	Garhwal	B. C. Khanduri	BJP
3	Almora	Jeevan Sharma	BJP
4	Nainital	Balraj Pasi	BJP
5	Bijnor (SC)	Mangal Ram Premi	BJP
6	Amroha	Chetan Chauhan	BJP
7	Moradabad	Ghulam Mohammad Khan	JD
8	Rampur	Rajendra Kumar Sharma	BJP
9	Sambhal	Sripal Singh Yadav	JD
10	Badaun	Swami Chinmayanand	BJP
11	Aonla	Raj Veer Singh	BJP
12	Bareilly	Santosh Gangwar	BJP
13	Pilibhit	Parshuram Gangwar	BJP
14	Shahjahanpur	Satyapal Yadav	JD
15	Kheri	Gendan Lal Kanaujia	BJP
16	Shahabad	Surendra Pal Pathak	BJP
17	Sitapur	Janardan Prasad Mishra	BJP
18	Misrikh (SC)	Ram Lal Rahi	INC
19	Hardoi (SC)	Jai Prakash Rawat	BJP
20	Lucknow	Atal Bihari Vajpayee	BJP
21	Mohanlalganj (SC)	Chhotey Lal	BJP
22	Unnao	Devi Bux Singh	BJP
23	Rae Bareli	Sheila Kaul	INC
24	Pratapgarh	Abhay Pratap Singh	JD
25	Amethi	Rajiv Gandhi	INC
25	Amethi	Satish Sharma	INC
26	Sultanpur	Vishwanath Das Shastri	BJP
27	Akbarpur (SC)	Ram Avadh	JD
28	Faizabad	Vinay Katiyar	BJP
29	Barabanki (SC)	Ram Sagar Rawat	JP
30	Kaiserganj	Laxminarain Mani Tripathi	BJP
31	Bahraich	Rudrasen Chaudhary	BJP
32	Balrampur	Satya Deo Singh	BJP
33	Gonda	Brij Bhushan Sharan Singh	BJP
34	Basti (SC)	Shyam Lal Kamal	BJP
35	Domariyaganj	Rampal Singh	BJP
36	Khalilabad	Ashthabhuja Prasad Shukla	BJP
37	Bansgaon (SC)	Raj Narain Passi	BJP
38	Gorakhpur	Mahant Avedyanath	BJP
39	Maharajganj	Pankaj Chaudhary	BJP
40	Padrauna	Ram Nagina Mishra	BJP
41	Deoria	Mohan Singh	JD
42	Salempur	Hari Kewal Prasad	JD
43	Ballia	Chandra Shekhar	JP
44	Ghosi	Kalpnath Rai	INC
45	Azamgarh	Chandrajit Yadav	JD
46	Lalganj (SC)	Ram Badan	JD
47	Machhlishahr	Sheo Sharan Verma	JD
48	Jaunpur	Arjun Singh Yadav	JD
49	Saidpur (SC)	Rajnath Sonkar Shastri	JD
50	Ghazipur	Vishwanath Shastri	CPI
51	Chandauli	Ananda Ratna Maurya	BJP
52	Varanasi	Shrish Chandra Dikshit	BJP
53	Robertsganj (SC)	Ram Nihor Rai	JD
54	Mirzapur	Virendra Singh	BJP
55	Phulpur	Ram Pujan Patel	JD
56	Allahabad	Saroj Dubey	JD
57	Chail (SC)	Shashi Prakash	JD
58	Fatehpur	Vishwanath Pratap Singh	JD
59	Banda	Prakash Narain Tripathi	BJP
60	Hamirpur	Vishwanath Sharma	BJP
61	Jhansi	Rajendra Agnihotri	BJP
62	Jalaun (SC)	Gaya Prasad Kori	BJP
63	Ghatampur (SC)	Keshari Lal	JD
64	Bilhaur	Shyam Bihari Misra	BJP
65	Kanpur	Jagatvir Singh Drona	BJP
66	Etawah	Kanshi Ram	BSP
67	Kannauj	Chhotey Singh Yadav	JP
68	Farrukhabad	Salman Khurshid	INC
69	Mainpuri	Uday Pratap Singh	JP
70	Jalesar	Swami Sureshanand	BJP
71	Etah	Mahadeepak Shakya	BJP
72	Firozabad (SC)	Prabhu Dayal Katheria	BJP
73	Agra	Bhagwan Shankar Rawat	BJP
74	Mathura	Sakshi Maharaj	BJP
75	Hathras (SC)	Lal Bahadur Rawal	BJP
76	Aligarh	Sheela Gautam	BJP
77	Khurja	Roshan Lal	JD
78	Bulandshahr	Chhatrapal Singh Lodha	BJP
79	Hapur	Ramesh Chand Tomar	BJP
80	Meerut	Amar Pal Singh	BJP
81	Baghpat	Ajit Singh	JD
82	Muzaffarnagar	Naresh Kumar Balyan	BJP
83	Kairana	Harpal Singh Panwar	JD
84	Saharanpur	Rasheed Masood	JD
85	Haridwar (SC)	Ram Singh Mandebas	BJP

== West Bengal ==
Constituency	Member	Party
Alipurduars (ST)	Pius Tirkey	Revolutionary Socialist Party
Arambagh (SC)	Anil Basu	Communist Party of India (Marxist)
Asansol	Haradhan Roy	Communist Party of India (Marxist)
Balurghat (SC)	Palas Barman	Revolutionary Socialist Party
Bankura	Basudeb Acharia	Communist Party of India (Marxist)
Barasat	Chitta Basu (politician)	All India Forward Bloc
Barrackpore	Tarit Baran Topdar	Communist Party of India (Marxist)
Basirhat	Manoranjan Sur	Communist Party of India
Berhampore	Nani Bhattacharya	Revolutionary Socialist Party
Berhampore	Pramothesh Mukherjee	Revolutionary Socialist Party
Bolpur	Somnath Chatterjee	Communist Party of India (Marxist)
Burdwan	Dr. Sudhir Ray	Communist Party of India (Marxist)
Calcutta North East	Ajit Kumar Panja	Indian National Congress
Calcutta North West	Dr. Debiprosad Pal	Indian National Congress
Contai	Sudhir Kumar Giri	Communist Party of India (Marxist)
Coochbehar (SC)	Amar Roy Pradhan	All India Forward Bloc
Darjeeling	Inder Jit	Indian National Congress
Diamond Harbour	Amal Datta	Communist Party of India (Marxist)
Dumdum	Nirmal Kanti Chatterjee	Communist Party of India (Marxist)
Durgapur (SC)	Purna Chandra Malik	Communist Party of India (Marxist)
Hooghly	Rupchand Pal	Communist Party of India (Marxist)
Howrah	Susanta Chakraborty	Communist Party of India (Marxist)
Jadavpur	Malini Bhattacharya	Communist Party of India (Marxist)
Jalpaiguri	Jitendra Nath Das	Communist Party of India (Marxist)
Jangipur	Abedin Zainal	Communist Party of India (Marxist)
Jaynagar (SC)	Sanat Kumar Mandal	Revolutionary Socialist Party
Jhargram (ST)	Rupchand Murmu	Communist Party of India (Marxist)
Katwa	Saifuddin Choudhury	Communist Party of India (Marxist)
Krishnagar	Ajoy Mukhopadhyay	Communist Party of India (Marxist)
Malda	A. B. A. Ghani Khan Choudhury	Indian National Congress
Mathurapur (SC)	Radhika Ranjan Pramanik	Communist Party of India (Marxist)
Midnapore	Indrajit Gupta	Communist Party of India
Murshidabad	Syed Masudal Hossain	Communist Party of India (Marxist)
Nabadwip (SC)	Dr. Asim Bala	Communist Party of India (Marxist)
Panskura	Geeta Mukherjee	Communist Party of India
Purulia	Bir Sing Mahato	All India Forward Bloc
Raiganj	Subrata Mukherjee	Communist Party of India (Marxist)
Serampore	Sudarsan Raychaudhuri	Communist Party of India (Marxist)
Tamluk	Satyagopal Misra	Communist Party of India (Marxist)
Uluberia	Hannan Mollah	Communist Party of India (Marxist)
Vishnupur (SC)	Sukhendu Khan	Communist Party of India (Marxist)
