= Tufani Saroj =

Indian politician

Member of Uttar Pradesh Legislative Assembly
- Incumbent
- Assumed office 10 March 2022
- Preceded by: Dinesh Choudhary
- Constituency: Kerakat, Jaunpur

Member of Parliament, Lok Sabha
- In office May 2009 – May 2014
- Preceded by: Umakant Yadav
- Succeeded by: Ram Charitra Nishad
- Constituency: MachhliShahr, Jaunpur
- In office October 1999 – May 2009
- Preceded by: Bizay Sonkar Shastri
- Succeeded by: Constituency Abolished
- Constituency: Saidpur, Ghazipur

Personal details
- Born: 2 July 1956 (age 69) Varanasi, Uttar Pradesh, India
- Party: Samajwadi Party
- Spouse: Munni Devi
- Children: 5 including Priya Saroj
- Education: Graduation
- Alma mater: Gorakhpur University
- Profession: Agriculture
- Website: http://www.samajwadiparty.in

Tufani Saroj (born 2 July 1956) is an Indian politician and a former Member of Parliament in 13th and 14th Lok Sabha from Saidpur, Ghazipur and 15th Lok Sabha from MachhliShahr, Jaunpur district of Uttar Pradesh respectively, India. He represents the MachhliShahr Constituency in Jaunpur district of Uttar Pradesh, India and is a Member of Samajwadi Party.

== Early life and education ==
Tufani Saroj was born 2 July 1956 in Jaunpur District of Uttar Pradesh to his father Jangi and mother Mulana Devi. He married Munni Devi on 8 May 1986. They have four daughters and a son. He attended Baldeo Degree College, Baragaon, Varanasi for Bachelor of Arts.

== Political career ==
Tufani Saroj is a Member of the Samajwadi Party and has won the 1999, 2004 & 2009 Indian general Elections from the Saidpur, Ghazipur and Machhlishahr, Jaunpur (Lok Sabha constituency) on Samajwadi Party ticket.

In 16th Loksabha (2014) Elections, Samajwadi Party again made him its candidate from Machhali Shahar (Lok Sabha Constituency). He contested election but lost in Narendra Modi wave, he lost to Bhartiya Janta Party Ram Charitra Nishad and stood on third with 191,387 (19.18%) votes.

== Posts Held ==
SL	From	To	Position
1.	1999	2004	Elected to 13th Lok Sabha (1st term) from Saidpur, Ghazipur
2.	1999	2000	Member, Committee on Information technology
3.	2000	2001	Member, Committee on the Welfare of Scheduled Castes and Scheduled Tribes
4.	2001	2002	Member, Committee on Subordinate Legislation
5.	2004	2009	Re-elected to 14th Lok Sabha (2nd term) from Saidpur, Ghazipur
6.	5 Aug. 2004	2009	Member, Committee on Human Resource Development
7.	1 Aug. 2007	2009	Member, Committee on Estimates
8.	5 Aug. 2007	2009	Member, Committee on Information Technology
9.	7 Aug. 2007	2009	Member, Committee on MPLADS
10.	2009	2014	Re-elected to 15th Lok Sabha (3rd term) from MachhliShhar, Jaunpur
11.	6 Aug. 2009	2014	Member, Committee on the Welfare of Scheduled Castes and Scheduled Tribes (2009-2010)
12.	31 Aug. 2009	2014	Member, Committee on Information Technology
13.	7 Oct. 2009	2014	Member, Committee on Members of Parliament Local Area Development Scheme
14.	10 Mar. 2022		Elected to 18th Uttar Pradesh Assembly from Kerakat, Jaunpur

== See also ==
- Official biographical sketch in Parliament of India website
- http://loksabhaph.nic.in/Members/memberbioprofile.aspx?mpsno=401&lastls=13
- http://loksabhaph.nic.in/Members/memberbioprofile.aspx?mpsno=401&lastls=14
- http://loksabhaph.nic.in/Members/memberbioprofile.aspx?mpsno=401&lastls=15
