= Machhlishahr Lok Sabha constituency =

Constituency of the Indian parliament in Uttar Pradesh

Coordinates: 25.69°N 82.41°E

Machhlishahr UP-74
- Lok Sabha constituency
- Interactive Map Outlining Machhlishahr Lok Sabha constituency

Constituency details
- Country: India
- Region: North India
- State: Uttar Pradesh
- Assembly constituencies: Machhlishahr; Mariyahu; Zafrabad; Kerakat; Pindra
- Established: 1962
- Reservation: SC

Member of Parliament
- 18th Lok Sabha
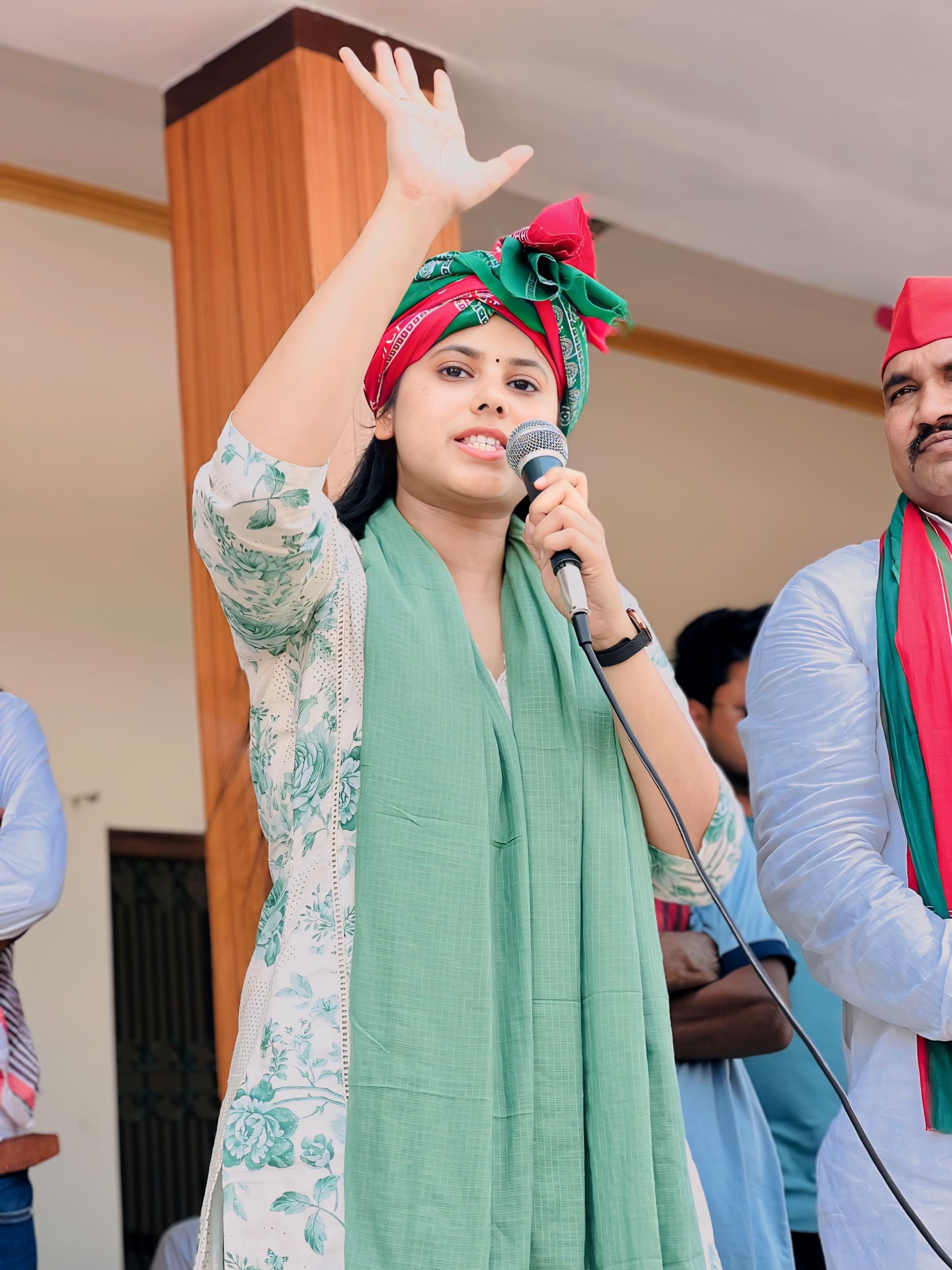
- Incumbent Priya Saroj
- Party: Samajwadi Party
- Elected year: 2024

Machhlishahr is a Lok Sabha parliamentary constituency in Uttar Pradesh, India. Machhlishar Loksabha is combined of Jaunpur And Varanasi districts.

== Assembly constituency ==
No	Name	District	Member	Party	2024 Lead
369	Machhlishahr (SC)	Jaunpur	Ragini Sonkar	SP	SP
370	Mariyahu	Jaunpur	R.K. Patel	AD(S)	BJP
371	Zafrabad	Jaunpur	Jagdish Narayan	SBSP	SP
372	Kerakat (SC)	Jaunpur	Tufani Saroj	SP	SP
384	Pindra	Varanasi	Avadhesh Kumar Singh	BJP	BJP

== Members of Parliament ==
Year	Member	Party
1962	Ganapat Ram	Indian National Congress
1967	Nageshwar Dwivedi	Indian National Congress
1971	Nageshwar Dwivedi	Indian National Congress
1977	Raj Keshar Singh	Janata Party
1980	Sheo Sharan Verma	Janata Party (Secular)
1984	Sripati Mishra	Indian National Congress
1989	Sheo Sharan Verma	Janata Dal
1991	Sheo Sharan Verma	Janata Dal
1996	Ram Vilas Vedanti	Bharatiya Janata Party
1998	Swami Chinmayanand	Bharatiya Janata Party
1999	Chandra Nath Singh	Samajwadi Party
2004	Umakant Yadav	Bahujan Samaj Party
2009	Tufani Saroj	Samajwadi Party
2014	Ram Charitra Nishad	Bharatiya Janata Party
2019	B. P. Saroj	Bharatiya Janata Party
2024	Priya Saroj	Samajwadi Party

== Election results ==
=== 2024 ===
2024 Indian general elections: Machhlishahr
Party	Candidate	Votes	%	±%
SP	Priya Saroj	451,292	42.57	▲39.19
BJP	B. P. Saroj	415,442	39.19	▼8.00
BSP	Kripa Shankar Saroj	157,291	14.84	▼32.33
NOTA	None of the Above	9,303	0.88	▲0.17
Majority		35,850	3.38	▲3.36
Turnout		10,60,063	54.63	▼1.36
SP gain from BJP		Swing		

Detailed Results at: https://results.eci.gov.in/PcResultGenJune2024/ConstituencywiseS2474.htm

=== 2019 ===
2019 Indian general election: Machhlishahr
Party	Candidate	Votes	%	±%
BJP	B. P. Saroj	488,397	47.19	
BSP	Tribhuvan Ram	488,216	47.17	
SBSP	Raj Nath	11,223	1.08	
NOTA	None of the Above	10,830	1.05	
Majority		181	0.02	
Turnout		1034,925	55.99	
BJP hold		Swing		

=== 2014 ===
2014 Indian general election: Machhlishahr
Party	Candidate	Votes	%	±%
BJP	Ram Charitra Nishad	438,210	43.91	
BSP	B. P. Saroj	2,66,055	26.66	
SP	Tufani Saroj	1,91,387	19.18	
INC	Tufani Nishad	36,275	3.64	
CPI	Subas Chandra	18,777	1.88	
NOTA	None of the Above	8,448	0.85	
Majority		1,72,155	17.25	
Turnout		9,97,902	52.75	
BJP gain from SP		Swing		

== See also ==
- Machhlishahr
- List of constituencies of the Lok Sabha
