= Nageshwar Dwivedi =

Indian politician

Member of Parliament, Lok Sabha
- In office 1967-1977
- Preceded by: Ganapati Ram
- Succeeded by: Raj Keshar Singh
- Constituency: Machhlishahr, Uttar Pradesh

Member of Legislative Assembly, Vidhan Sabha, Uttar Pradesh
- In office 1952-1961
- Constituency: Gadwara, now Mungra Badshahpur, Uttar Pradesh

Personal details
- Born: 16 October 1916 Prem ka pura, Jaunpur district, United Provinces, British India (present-day Uttar Pradesh, India)
- Died: 1 January 2010 (aged 93) Machhlishahr, Uttar Pradesh
- Party: Indian National Congress
- Spouse: Samarthyavati Devi
- Children: [[son(Sabhapati Dwivedi, Vachaspati Dwivedi, Umapati Dwivedi, Lakshamipati Dwivedi, Sripati Dwivedi, Vidyapati Dwivedi, Girijapati Dwivedi)] [Daughter(Shobha Devi, Durgavati, Shashi Mishra)]]

Nageshwar Dwivedi (16 October 1916 – 1 January 2010) was an Indian politician. He was elected to Uttar Pradesh Assembly Vidhansabha, from Gadwara Assembly Constituency, now Mungra Badshahpur as a member of the Indian National Congress. He was elected to the Lok Sabha, the lower house of the Parliament of India from the Machhlishahr, Uttar Pradesh as a member of the Indian National Congress.
