= Hurhuri =

Huruhuri Raj Nagar
- Location in Jaunpur, Uttar Pradesh, India Huruhuri (India)
- Coordinates: 25.647°N 82.881°E
- Country: India
- State: Uttar Pradesh
- District: Jaunpur
- Tehsil: Kerakat

Government
  - Type: Gram Panchayat
- Elevation: 83 m (272 ft)

Population
  - Total: 1,987

Languages
  - Official: Hindi
- Time zone: UTC+5:30 (IST)
- PIN: 222142
- Vehicle registration: UP62
- Sex ratio: 984/1003 ♂/♀
- Lok Sabha constituency: Machhlishahr (Lok Sabha constituency)
- Vidhan Sabha constituency: Kerakat (Vidhan Sabha constituency)
- Distance from Kerakat: 5 kilometres (3.1 mi)
- Distance from Jaunpur District: 25 kilometres (16 mi)
- Website: http://jaunpur.nic.in/

Huruhuri is a village about 2 km north from the Gomti River in the tehsil of Kerakat, Jaunpur, Uttar Pradesh, India. It belongs to the Varanasi Division. It is located 25 km east of the city of Jaunpur, 4 km west of Kerakat, and 274 km from Lucknow, the capital of Uttar Pradesh. Hurhuri's Postal Index Number is 222142 and the postal head office is situated in Kerakat and Branch Office is JaiGopalGanj. Huruhuri is situated Near State Highway 36.

== Transport ==
=== By rail ===
- Kerakat railway station-5 km
- Gangauli railway station-2.5 km

=== By road ===
- Village is connected by SH-36 Saidpur Khajurhat Road
- Kerakat Bus Stand-5 km

=== By air ===
- Shri Lal Bahadur Shashtri Airport-38 km

== Population ==
Huruhuri is a medium size village located in Kerakat of Jaunpur district, Uttar Pradesh with total 310 families residing. The Huruhuri village has population of 1987 of which 984 are Males while 1003 are Females as per Population Census 2011.

In Huruhuri village population of Children with age 0-6 is 275 which makes up 13.84% of total population of village. Average sex ratio of Huruhuri village is 1019 which is higher than Uttar Pradesh state average of 912. Child Sex Ratio for the Huruhuri as per census is 964, higher than Uttar Pradesh average of 902.

Huruhuri village has higher literacy rate compared to Uttar Pradesh. In 2011, literacy rate of Hurhuri village was 77.39% compared to 67.68% of Uttar Pradesh. In Hurhuri Male literacy stands at 86.26% while female literacy rate was 68.78%.

As per constitution of India and Panchyati Raaj Act, Huruhuri village is administrated by Sarpanch (Head of Village) who is elected representative of village.
