= Mariyahu Assembly constituency =

Constituency of the Uttar Pradesh legislative assembly in India

Coordinates: 25.60°N 82.60°E

Mariyahu
- Constituency No. 370 for the Uttar Pradesh Legislative Assembly

Constituency details
- Country: India
- Region: North India
- State: Uttar Pradesh
- District: Jaunpur
- Total electors: 3,37,483
- Reservation: None

Member of Legislative Assembly
- 18th Uttar Pradesh Legislative Assembly
- Incumbent Dr. R.K. Patel
- Party: AD(S)
- Alliance: NDA
- Elected year: 2022

Mariyahu is a constituency of the Uttar Pradesh Legislative Assembly covering the city of Mariyahu in the Jaunpur district of Uttar Pradesh, India.

Mariyahu is one of five assembly constituencies in the Machhlishahr Lok Sabha constituency. Since 2008, this assembly constituency is numbered 370 amongst 403 constituencies.

== Members of Legislative Assembly ==
Year	Member	Party
1952	Virendra Pati	Indian National Congress
1957	Malikhan Singh	Bharatiya Jana Sangh
1962	Brijeshwar Sahai	Indian National Congress
1967	Malikhan Singh	Bharatiya Jana Sangh
1969	Malikhan Singh	Bharatiya Jana Sangh
1974	Baba Ram Nath	Communist Party of India (Marxist)
1977	Malikhan Singh	Janata Party
1980	Raghuvir Yadav	Indian National Congress (I)
1985	Raghuvir Yadav	Indian National Congress
1989	Indal Singh Chauhan	Janata Dal
1991	Narendra Singh	Bharatiya Janata Party
1993	Narendra Singh	Bharatiya Janata Party
1996	Manik Chand Yadav	Samajwadi Party
2002	Ashok Singh Chauhan	Bharatiya Janata Party
2007	Ashok Singh Chauhan	Bharatiya Janata Party
2012	Shraddha Yadav	Samajwadi Party
2017	Leena Tiwari	Apna Dal (Soneylal)
2022	R. K. Patel	Apna Dal (Soneylal)

== Election results ==
=== 2027 ===
2027 Uttar Pradesh Legislative Assembly election: Mariyahu
Party	Candidate	Votes	%	±%
INDIA				
NDA				
BSP				
NOTA	None of the above			
Majority				
Turnout				
gain from		Swing		

=== 2022 ===
2022 Uttar Pradesh Legislative Assembly election: Mariyahu
Party	Candidate	Votes	%	±%
AD(S)	Dr R.K. Patel	76,007	39.25	▲6.59
SP	Sushma Patel	74,801	38.62	▲12.26
BSP	Anand Dubey	32,783	16.93	▼3.66
NOTA	None of the above	1,431	0.74	▲0.08
Majority		1,206	0.63	▼5.67
Turnout		193,664	57.38	▼1.05
AD(S) hold		Swing		

=== 2017 ===
Apna Dal (Sonelal) candidate Leena Tiwari won in 2017 Uttar Pradesh Legislative Elections defeating Samajwadi Party candidate Shraddha Yadav by a margin of 11,350 votes.

2017 Uttar Pradesh Legislative Assembly Election: Mariyah
Party	Candidate	Votes	%	±%
AD(S)	Leena Tiwari	58,804	32.66	
SP	Shraddha Yadav	47,454	26.36	
BSP	Bholanath Shukla	37,066	20.59	
Independent	Seema Singh	21,440	11.91	
Independent	Lal Pratap	1,690	0.94	
NOTA	None of the above	1,174	0.66	
Majority		11,350	6.3	
Turnout		180,043	58.43	
