= Lakshmi Shankar Yadav =

Indian politician and freedom fighter

Member of the Legislative Assembly
- In office 1952 – 1957, 1962, 1967, 1969, 1974, 1977
- Constituency: Shahganj (Purab), Uttar Pradesh

Minister for Public Works, Uttar Pradesh

President of Uttar Pradesh Congress Committee

Personal details
- Born: 1 October 1917 Bishunpur, Jaunpur, Uttar Pradesh, India
- Died: 29 October 1995 (aged 78) Lucknow, Uttar Pradesh, India
- Party: Indian National Congress

Lakshmi Shankar Yadav (1 October 1917 – 29 October 1995) was an Indian politician and freedom fighter from Uttar Pradesh, India. He was a member of the Constituent Assembly of India and held the position of a minister in the Uttar Pradesh government. He was affiliated with the Indian National Congress and served as the president of the Uttar Pradesh Congress Party. He was a member of the first Legislative Assembly of Uttar Pradesh, winning the 1952 elections from the Shahganj (Purab) constituency on a Congress ticket, and he was elected as a Member of the Legislative Assembly (MLA) six times.

== Career ==
In the 1952 general elections, he was elected as a Member of the Legislative Assembly from Uttar Pradesh for the first time. He also won the 1962, 1967, 1969 (mid-term elections) and 1974 elections on a Congress ticket. He began practicing law in 1943. From 1950 to 1952, he was a member of the Provisional Parliament. He served as the Secretary of the Legislative Assembly from 1954 to 1957. In 1969, 1970, 1971, 1973, and 1974, he held cabinet-level positions in various departments.

He hailed from Bishunpur, Jaunpur. As the Minister for Public Works of Uttar Pradesh, he contributed to the development of road infrastructure in Jaunpur district. He was involved in the education and healthcare sectors and promoted cooperative movements in the state, establishing societies for supporting farmers.

He established several educational institutions in Jaunpur district, including Gram Vikas Inter College, Khutahan; Shankar Higher Secondary School, Barauth; Yadavesh Vidya Mandir, Naupeda; and Ganesh Ram Higher Secondary School, Ratasi.
