= Ram Samujhavan =

Indian politician

Member of Parliament, Lok Sabha
- In office 1984-1989
- Preceded by: Rajnath Sonkar Shastri
- Succeeded by: Ram Sagar
- Constituency: Saidpur

Personal details
- Born: 8 September 1921
- Party: Indian National Congress

Ram Samujhavan is an Indian politician. He was elected to the Lok Sabha, the lower house of the Parliament of India from the Saidpur, Uttar Pradesh as a member of the Indian National Congress.
