= Ramesh Singh =

Indian politician

Member of the Uttar Pradesh Legislative Assembly
- Incumbent
- Assumed office March 2022
- Constituency: Shahganj Assembly constituency

Personal details
- Born: 1980 (age 45–46)
- Party: NISHAD Party
- Occupation: Politician

Ramesh Singh (born 1980) is an Indian politician from Uttar Pradesh. He is a member of the Uttar Pradesh Legislative Assembly from Shahganj Assembly constituency in Jaunpur district. He won the 2022 Uttar Pradesh Legislative Assembly election representing the Nirbal Indian Shoshit Hamara Aam Dal Party.

== Early life and education ==
Singh is from Husainganj, Jaunpur, Uttar Pradesh. He is the son of Ram Singh. He passed Class 8. His wife looks after farming and family business.

== Career ==
Singh won from Shahganj Assembly constituency representing the Nirbal Indian Shoshit Hamara Aam Dal Party in the 2022 Uttar Pradesh Legislative Assembly election. He polled 87,233 votes and defeated his nearest rival, Shailendra Yadav Lalai of the Samajwadi Party, by a margin of 719 votes.
