= Saidpur Lok Sabha constituency =

Former constituency of the Indian parliament in Uttar Pradesh

Coordinates: 25.6°N 83.2°E

Saidpur
- Former Lok Sabha constituency

Constituency details
- Country: India
- Region: North India
- State: Uttar Pradesh
- Established: 1952
- Abolished: 2008

Saidpur was a Lok Sabha constituency in Uttar Pradesh, India.

== Members of Parliament ==
Year	Name	Party
1952	Ganpati Ram	Indian National Congress
1952	Vishram Prasad	Indian National Congress
1957	Ganpati Ram	Indian National Congress
1962	Ganpati Ram	Indian National Congress
1967	Shambhu Nath	Indian National Congress
1971	Shambhu Nath	Indian National Congress
1977	Ram Sagar	Janata Party
1980	Rajnath Sonkar Shastri	Janata Party (Secular)
1984	Ram Samujhavan	Indian National Congress (I)
1989	Ram Sagar	Janata Dal
1991	Rajnath Sonkar Shastri	Bharatiya Janata Party
1996	Vidyasagar Sonkar	Bharatiya Janata Party
1998	Bizay Sonkar Shastri	Bharatiya Janata Party
1999	Tufani Saroj	Samajwadi Party
2004	Tufani Saroj	Samajwadi Party
Constituency Demolished in 2008.

== See also ==
- List of constituencies of the Lok Sabha
