= Banke Lal Sonkar =

Indian politician

MLA, 13th Legislative Assembly
- Incumbent
- Assumed office 1996-2002
- Constituency: Shahganj

Personal details
- Born: 13 January 1957 (age 69) Jaunpur district
- Party: Bharatiya Janata Party
- Spouse: Smt. Asha Sonkar (wife)
- Children: 2 son, 2 daughter
- Parent: Late Shri Rajaram Sonkar (father)
- Education: BA, LLB
- Occupation: Politician
- Profession: Farmer & politician

Banke Lal Sonkar is an Indian politician and a member of the 13th Legislative Assembly of Uttar Pradesh. He represents the Shahganj constituency of Uttar Pradesh and is a member of the Bhartiya Janata Party political party.

== Early life and education ==
Banke Lal Sonkar was born in Jaunpur district. He is educated until a Bachelor of Arts (BA) degree, and then completed a Bachelor of Law (LLB) degree.

== Political career ==
Banke Lal Sonkar has been an MLA for one term. He represented the Shahganj constituency and is a member of the Bhartiya Janata Party political party. He is the Vice President in BJP SC Morcha in Uttar Pradesh.
