= Mahadewa Assembly constituency =

Constituency of the Uttar Pradesh legislative assembly in India

Coordinates: 26.70°N 82.85°E

Mahadewa
- Constituency No. 311 for the Uttar Pradesh Legislative Assembly

Constituency details
- Country: India
- Region: North India
- State: Uttar Pradesh
- District: Basti
- Total electors: 3,60,632
- Reservation: SC

Member of Legislative Assembly
- 18th Uttar Pradesh Legislative Assembly
- Incumbent Dudhram
- Party: SBSP
- Alliance: NDA
- Elected year: 2022

Mahadewa (311) is a constituency of the Uttar Pradesh Legislative Assembly in the Basti district of Uttar Pradesh, India.

Mahadewa is one of five assembly constituencies in the Basti Lok Sabha constituency. Since 2008, this assembly constituency is numbered 311 amongst 403 constituencies.

== Members of Legislative Assembly (MLAs) ==
#	Term	Member of Legislative Assembly	Party	From	To	Days	Comment
01	2nd Vidhan Sabha	Baldeo Singh	Independent	April 1957	March 1962	1,800	
02	3rd Vidhan Sabha	Vishnu Pratap Singh	Indian National Congress	March 1962	March 1967	1,828	
03	4th Vidhan Sabha	B. Lal	Swatantra Party	March 1967	April 1968	402	
04	5th Vidhan Sabha	Ganga Prasad	Indian National Congress	February 1969	March 1974	1,832	
05	7th Vidhan Sabha	Girdhari Lal	Janata Party	June 1977	February 1980	969	Constituency known as "Nagar East" and again renamed in 2008 as "Mahadewa"
06	08th Vidhan Sabha	Ram Awadh Prasad	Indian National Congress (Indira)	June 1980	March 1985	1,735	Constituency known as "Nagar East" and again renamed in 2008 as "Mahadewa"
07	9th Vidhan Sabha	Ram Jiyawan	Indian National Congress	March 1985	November 1989	1,725	Constituency known as "Nagar East" and again renamed in 2008 as "Mahadewa"
08	10th Vidhan Sabha	Ram Karan Arya	Janata Dal	December 1989	April 1991	488	Constituency known as "Nagar East" and again renamed in 2008 as "Mahadewa"
09	11th Vidhan Sabha	Ved Prakash	Bhartiya Janata Party	June 1991	December 1992	533	Constituency known as "Nagar East" and again renamed in 2008 as "Mahadewa"
10	12th Vidhan Sabha	Ram Karan Arya	Samajwadi Party	December 1993	October 1995	693	Constituency known as "Nagar East" and again renamed in 2008 as "Mahadewa"
11	13th Vidhan Sabha	Ved Prakash	Bahujan Samaj Party	October 1996	March 2002	1,967	Constituency known as "Nagar East" and again renamed in 2008 as "Mahadewa"
12	14th Vidhan Sabha	Ram Karan Arya	Samajwadi Party	February 2002	May 2007	1,902	Constituency known as "Nagar East" and again renamed in 2008 as "Mahadewa"
13	15th Vidhan Sabha	Dudhram	Bahujan Samaj Party	May 2007	March 2012	1,762	Constituency known as "Nagar East" and again renamed in 2008 as "Mahadewa"
14	16th Vidhan Sabha	Ram Karan Arya	Samajwadi Party	March 2012	March 2017	1,829	
15	17th Vidhan Sabha	Ravi Kumar Sonkar	Bhartiya Janata Party	March 2017	March 2022		
16	18th Uttar Pradesh Assembly	Dudhram	Suheldev Bhartiya Samaj Party	March 2022	Incumbent		

== Election results ==
=== 2027 ===
2027 Uttar Pradesh Legislative Assembly election: Mahadewa
Party	Candidate	Votes	%	±%
INDIA				
NDA				
BSP				
NOTA	None of the above			
Majority				
Turnout				
gain from		Swing		

=== 2022 ===
2022 Uttar Pradesh Legislative Assembly election: Mahadewa
Party	Candidate	Votes	%	±%
SBSP	Dudhram	83,350	39.47	
BJP	Ravi	77,855	36.87	▼4.49
BSP	Laxmi Chandra Kharvar	40,207	19.04	▼9.33
Jan Adhikar Party	Purnima	2,907	1.38	
INC	Brijesh Kumar	2,255	1.07	
NOTA	None of the above	1,582	0.75	▼0.38
Majority		5,495	2.6	▼10.39
Turnout		211,187	58.56	▲0.14
SBSP gain from BJP		Swing		

=== 2017 ===
Bharatiya Janta Party candidate Ravi Kumar Sonkar won in last Assembly election of 2017 Uttar Pradesh Legislative Elections defeating Bahujan Samaj Party candidate Doodhram by a margin of 25,884 votes.

2017 General Elections: Mahadewa (SC)
Party	Candidate	Votes	%	±%
BJP	Ravi Kumar Sonkar	82,429	41.36	
BSP	Dudhram	56,545	28.37	
SP	Ram Karan Arya	47,914	24.04	
NISHAD	Govardhan	5,639	2.83	
NOTA	None of the above	2,231	1.13	
Majority		25,884	12.99	
Turnout		199,317	58.42	
BJP gain from SP		Swing	+8.54	

=== 2012 ===
2012 General Elections: Mahadewa (SC)
Party	Candidate	Votes	%	±%
SP	Ram Karan Arya	83,202	45.84	
BSP	Dudhram	63,943	35.23	
BJP	Beena Rai	10,816	5.96	
INC	Gauri Shankar	7,889	4.35	
SBSP	Kripa Shankar	4,797	2.64	
Independent	Lav Kush	3,848	2.12	
PECP	Govardhan	3,089	1.70	
	Remainder 5 candidates	3,919	2.16	
Majority		19,259	10.61	
Turnout		1,81,503	56.84	
SP gain from BSP		Swing		
