= Ram Charitra Nishad =

Indian politician

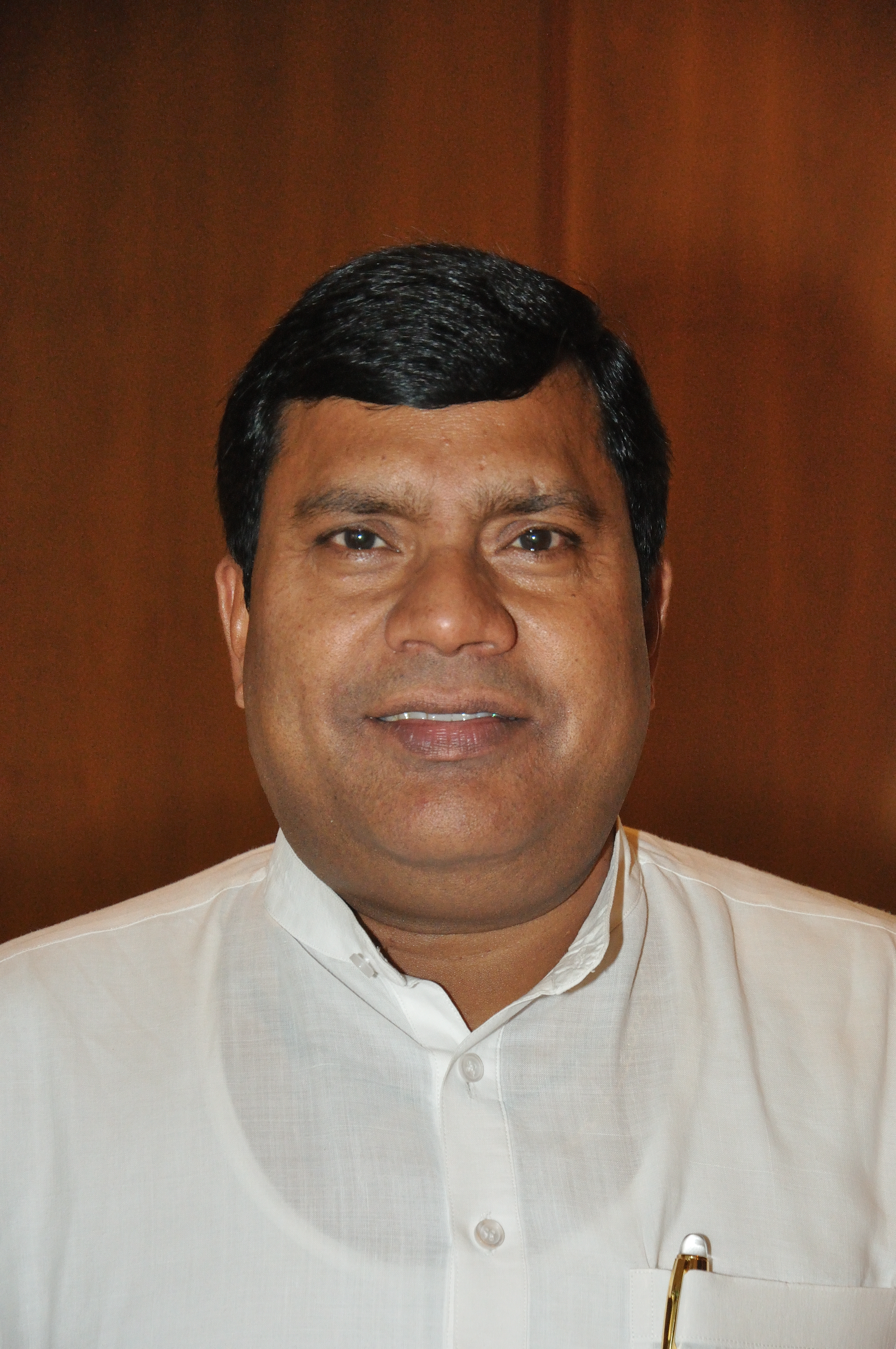

Member of Parliament, Lok Sabha
- In office 16 May 2014 – 23 May 2019
- Preceded by: Tufani Saroj
- Succeeded by: B. P. Saroj
- Constituency: Machhlishahr

Personal details
- Born: 1 May 1964 New Delhi, India
- Died: 3 May 2021 (aged 57) Noida, Uttar Pradesh, India
- Party: Samajwadi Party (19 April 2019 – 2021)
- Other political affiliations: Bharatiya Janata Party (2014-2019), Samajwadi Party from 2019
- Spouse: Smt. Anamika Sharma
- Children: 2
- Occupation: Consultant
- Website: kvguruji.com
- As of 17 December, 2016 Source: Lok Sabha

Ram Charitra Nishad (1 May 1964 – 3 May 2021) was an Indian politician, and a member of the Samajwadi Party who won the 2014 Indian general elections from the Machhlishahr (Lok Sabha constituency) on Bharatiya Janata Party ticket.

== Early life and education ==
Ram Charitra Nishad was born in New Delhi on 1 May 1964. He was born to Shri Ram Narayan and Smt. Dhanpati Devi. He has completed his education from A.P.N. Degree College, Basti, Uttar Pradesh. He married Anamika Sharma on 23 April 2000. He died from COVID-19 on 3 May 2021.

== Political career ==
- May 2014: Elected to 16th Lok Sabha
- Member (Permanent Special Invitee), Consultative Committee, Ministry of Tourism and Culture
- Member, Consultative Committee, Ministry of Finance and Corporate Affairs
- 25 March 2015 onwards: Member, Standing Committee on Transport, Tourism and Culture
- 1 May 2016 onwards: Member, Committee on the Welfare of Scheduled Castes and Scheduled Tribes
- 19 April 2019 : Left Bharatiya Janata Party because of not giving ticket again and Joined Samajwadi Party in presence of SP Chief Akhilesh Yadav.
- 23 May 2019: Lost election from Mirzapur (Lok Sabha constituency) on Samajwadi Party Ticket.
- 3 May 2021: Died From COVID-19
