= Ravi Kumar Sonkar =

Indian politician (born 1980)

MLA in 17th Legislative Assembly of Uttar Pradesh
- In office March 2017 – March 2022
- Preceded by: Ram Karan Arya
- Succeeded by: Dudhram
- Constituency: Mahadewa (Assembly constituency)

Personal details
- Born: 16 August 1980 (age 46) Purani Basti, Basti, Uttar Pradesh, India
- Party: Bharatiya Janata Party
- Spouse: Archana Sonkar (m. 2006)
- Children: 2
- Parent: Kalpnath Sonkar
- Education: Bachelor of Arts
- Alma mater: Gorakhpur University
- Occupation: MLA
- Profession: Agriculture; business

Ravi Kumar Sonkar (born 16 August 1980) is an Indian politician and a member of 17th Legislative Assembly of Uttar Pradesh of India. He represents the Mahadewa (Assembly constituency) in the Basti district of Uttar Pradesh and is a member of the Bharatiya Janata Party.

== Early life and education ==
Sonkar was born 16 August 1980 in Purani Basti, Basti district of Uttar Pradesh to his father Kalpnath Sonkar (former MP of Basti). In 2006, he married Archana Sonkar, they have two daughters. He belongs to Scheduled Caste (Khatik Sonkar) community. In 2011, he attended Deen Dayal Upadhyay Gorakhpur University and attained Bachelor of Arts degree.

== Political career ==
Sonkar inherited his passion for politics, his father Kalpanath Sonkar has been the MP from Basti (1989-1991). Since 2017, he has represented the Mahadewa (Assembly constituency) and is a member of the Bharatiya Janata Party. He defeated Bahujan Samaj Party candidate Doodhram Chaudhary by a margin of 25,884 votes.

== Posts held ==
#	From	To	Position	Comments
01	March 2017	March 2022	Member, 17th Legislative Assembly of Uttar Pradesh	
