= Shambhu Nath =

Indian politician (1928–2009)

Member of Parliament, Lok Sabha
- In office 1967–1977
- Preceded by: Ganpati Ram
- Succeeded by: Ram Sagar
- Constituency: Saidpur, Uttar Pradesh

Personal details
- Born: 31 July 1928
- Died: 12 December 2009 (aged 81) Bareilly, Uttar Pradesh, India
- Party: Indian National Congress

Shambhu Nath (31 July 1928 – 12 December 2009) was an Indian politician. He was elected to the Lok Sabha, the lower house of the Parliament of India from the Saidpur, Uttar Pradesh as a member of the Indian National Congress.

Nath died on 12 December 2009, at the age of 81.
