= Umakant Yadav =

Indian politician (born 1954)

- उमाकान्त यादव

Member of Parliament
- In office 2004–2009
- Preceded by: Chandra Nath Singh
- Succeeded by: Tufani Saroj
- Constituency: Machhlishahr

Member of the Uttar Pradesh Legislative Assembly
- In office 1991–1993
- Preceded by: Lalta Prasad Yadav
- Constituency: Khuthan Assembly constituency (Abolished in 2008)

Member of the Uttar Pradesh Legislative Assembly
- In office 1993–1996
- Preceded by: Himself
- Succeeded by: Himself
- Constituency: Khuthan Assembly constituency (Abolished in 2008)

Member of the Uttar Pradesh Legislative Assembly
- In office 1996–2002
- Preceded by: himself
- Succeeded by: Shailendra Yadav Lalai
- Constituency: Khuthan Assembly constituency (Abolished in 2008)

Personal details
- Born: 3 February 1954 (age 72) Azamgarh, Uttar Pradesh, India
- Party: BSP
- Other political affiliations: Samajwadi Party
- Spouse: Sudama Yadav
- Children: 5 sons
- As of 17 September, 2006

Umakant Yadav (born 3 February 1954) is an Indian politician for the Machhlishahr (Lok Sabha Constituency) in Uttar Pradesh. He is the elder brother of Ramakant Yadav. He is among the most well known politicians in Purvanchal (East U. P.).

== Political career ==
He was elected MLA for the first time in 1991 from Khuthan assembly constituency of Jaunpur as a BSP candidate, then in 1993 Uttar Pradesh Legislative Assembly election he was elected MLA from the alliance of Samajwadi Party and Bahujan Samaj Party. When the alliance broke in 1995, he came closer to the Samajwadi Party.In 1996 Uttar Pradesh Legislative Assembly election, he contested on a Samajwadi Party ticket and was elected for the third consecutive time from Khuthan assembly constituency. while being an SP MLA, he was accused of usurping the land of a relative of Samajwadi Party Maharashtra president Abu Asim Azmi so Samajwadi Party did not give him a ticket in the 2002 Uttar Pradesh Assembly elections, he contested from the JDU-BJP alliance but lost the election to Shailendra Yadav Lalai of BSP. Before the 2004 general elections, he again returned to the Bahujan Samaj Party and was elected as a member of the Lok Sabha as a BSP candidate from Machhlishahr Lok Sabha constituency, defeating the then Uttar Pradesh Vidhan Sabha Speaker Keshari Nath Tripathi. During the 2004 Indian general election, He was in jail but won the Lok Sabha election. In 2007, when he was a BSP MP, the then Chief Minister Mayawati called him to her residence and got him arrested by the then U.P.Police DGP Vikram Singh.

== Criminal Cases ==
He is considered a Bahubali (strongman) leader of Purvanchal, a total of 37 criminal cases including Gangster are registered against him. In 2022, a Jaunpur court sentenced him to life imprisonment in the Shahpur case, in which he was accused of attacking the Shahpur railway police Chauki, firing and killing a railway police constable to free his driver Rajkumar. In 2023, the court framed charges against him and his brother Ramakant Yadav in a 25-year-old case in which they were accused of firing and attacking BSP candidate Akbar Ahmad Dumpy during the 1998 Lok Sabha elections.
