= B. P. Saroj =

Member of the 17th Lok Sabha

Bholenath Prasad Saroj

Member of Parliament, Lok Sabha
- In office 23 May 2019 – 4 June 2024
- Preceded by: Ram Charitra Nishad
- Succeeded by: Priya Saroj
- Constituency: Machhlishahr

Personal details
- Born: 1 January 1961 (age 65) Madardeeh, Uttar Pradesh, India
- Party: Bharatiya Janata Party
- Other political affiliations: Bahujan Samaj Party
- Spouse: Indrawati Saroj
- Children: Pramod Saroj
- Parent: Panchamdas Saroj
- Education: University of Allahabad
- Occupation: Businessperson Developer, Industrialist, Agriculturist

Bholanath Saroj is an Indian politician and member of the 17th Lok Sabha from 2019, representing Machhlishahr constituency, Uttar Pradesh. He is a member of the Bharatiya Janata Party. He had contested the election from the same seat in 2014 as a member of BSP.
