= Kalpnath Sonkar =

Indian politician

Kalpnath Sonkar was an Indian politician. He was elected to the Lok Sabha from Basti twice, in 1980 from Congress party and again in 1989 from Janata Dal.

== Early life ==
Sonkar was a fruit seller before joining politics. He was the father of Ravi Kumar Sonkar. He was the General Secretary of All India Rashtriya Sanjay Manch, 1982 to 1985.
