= Dinesh Choudhary =

Indian politician

Dinesh Chaudhary

MLA, 17th Legislative Assembly
- In office 2017–2022
- Preceded by: Gulab Chandra Saroj
- Succeeded by: Tufani Saroj
- Constituency: Kerakat (Vidhan Sabha constituency), Jaunpur

Personal details
- Born: 9 October 1960 (age 65) Chhitauna Jalalpur Jaunpur
- Party: Bharatiya Janata Party
- Occupation: MLA
- Profession: Politician

Dinesh Chaudhary is an Indian politician and a member of 17th Legislative Assembly, Uttar Pradesh of India. He represents the Kerakat (Vidhan Sabha constituency) of Uttar Pradesh. He contested Uttar Pradesh Assembly Election as Bharatiya Janata Party candidate and defeated his close rival Sajai Kumar Saroj from Samajwadi Party with a margin of 15,259 votes.

== Posts held ==
#	From	To	Position	Comments
01	2017	2022	Member, 17th Legislative Assembly	

== See also ==
- Uttar Pradesh Legislative Assembly
