= Dudhram =

Indian politician (born 1960)

Member of the Uttar Pradesh Legislative Assembly
- Incumbent
- Assumed office March 2022
- Preceded by: Ravi Kumar Sonkar
- In office May 2007 – March 2012
- Preceded by: Ram Karan Arya
- Succeeded by: Ram Karan Arya
- Constituency: Mahadewa Assembly constituency

Personal details
- Born: 1 January 1960 (age 66) Pandey Bazar, Basti, Uttar Pradesh
- Party: Suheldev Bharatiya Samaj Party
- Spouse: Lata Devi (m. 1985)
- Children: 2
- Occupation: Politician
- Profession: Agriculture

Dudhram (born 1 January 1960), also spelled as Doodh Ram, is an Indian politician from Uttar Pradesh. He is a member of the 15th & 18th Uttar Pradesh Assembly from the Mahadewa Assembly constituency of Basti district, which is reserved for Scheduled Caste community. He won the 2022 Uttar Pradesh Legislative Assembly election representing the Suheldev Bharatiya Samaj Party.

== Early life ==
Dudhram was born in Marwatia village, Basti district, Uttar Pradesh. He is the son of Badri Prasad. He married Latha Devi in 1985.

== Career ==
Dudhram won from Mahadewa Assembly constituency representing the Suheldev Bharatiya Samaj Party in the 2022 Uttar Pradesh Legislative Assembly election. He polled 83,350 votes and defeated his nearest rival, Ravi Kumar Sonkar of Bharatiya Janata Party, by a margin of 5,495 votes. He first became an MLA winning from Nagar East Assembly constituency representing Bahujan Samaj Party in the 2007 Uttar Pradesh Legislative Assembly election defeating Ram Karan Arya by a margin of 11,006 votes. He lost Mahadewa seat in the 2012 Uttar Pradesh Legislative Assembly election on the Bahujan Samaj Party ticket to Ram Karan Arya of the Samajwadi Party by a margin of 19,259 votes. Later in the 2017 Assembly election, he lost to Ravi Kumar Sonkar of the BJP, by a margin of 25,884 votes.
