= Salaam Machhalishahari =

- Born: 1 July 1921; Machhali Shahar, District Jaunpur, Uttar Pradesh, India.
- Died: 19 November 1972 (aged 51); Delhi, India
- Occupation: Poet
- Known for: Nazms, Ghazals, Journalist, Qat'aa

Salaam Machhalishahari (1921-1972), or Salam Machhali Sheri, was an Indian Urdu-language poet.

== Biography ==
Machhalishahari was born in Machhali Shahar, a city in District Jaunpur of Uttar Pradesh, on 1 July 1921. He was fluent in Urdu, Persian and English languages. He worked in the Urdu Service Department of the All India Radio, New Delhi. He died on 19 November 1972. Salam Macchlishheri is one of the few poets who escaped the ideological impact of Progressive Writers Movement and wrote a different kind of romantic poetry marked for its spontaneity and naturalness. He was one of the most read poets of his time and had special appeal with young readers.

He was born Abdussalam on July 1, 1921 at Mahatwana Macchlishehr in Jaunpur district. He was first made to learn Quran by heart. In 1935, he passed the middle school examination from a District Board school. He could complete only his high school education after which he got an employment and worked for Allahabad University library. During his service in the library, he got an opportunity to study the literatures of several languages. In 1933, he changed his job and worked as a script writer at Lucknow radio station. While in Lucknow, he also acted as the honorary editor of the University magazine called Mizraab. In 1952, he was promoted as Assistant Producer and posted at Srinagar radio station. After his tenure there, he was promoted as Producer and sent to Delhi radio station. For his cumulative contribution, the prestigious Padma Sri award was also conferred on him.

== Literary career ==
Many of Machhalishahari’s ghazals have been put to music and sung by Jagjit Singh. Machhalishahari also wrote sonnets in Urdu. He was actively associated with the Progressive Writers Movement. In his Marathi article "Geet Yatre", Madhav Moholkar asserted that Faiz Ahmed Faiz, Majaz, Jazbi, Salaam Machhalishahari, Sahir Ludhianvi and other poets had started a new era of progressive poetry in Urdu literature.

In 1996, the Urdu Academy published selected poems with the title Intekhab Salam Machhali Shehri ISBN 8171211011. A critical appraisal of his life and literary contributions is Aziz Indori's Salaam Machhalishahari – Shakhsiyat aur Funn.

== Bibliography ==
- Intekhab Salam Machhali Shehri
