= Kailash Nath Sonkar =

Indian politician

Member of the Uttar Pradesh Legislative Assembly
- In office March 2017 – March 2022
- Preceded by: Tribhuvan Ram
- Succeeded by: Tribhuvan Ram
- Constituency: Ajagara

Personal details
- Party: Suheldev Bharatiya Samaj Party

Kailash Nath Sonkar is an Indian politician who served as a Member of the Uttar Pradesh Legislative Assembly from Ajagara since 2017 to 2022 representing the Suheldev Bharatiya Samaj Party. He is father of Machhlishahr MLA Ragini Sonkar.
