= Kerakat Assembly constituency =

Constituency of the Uttar Pradesh legislative assembly in India

Coordinates: 25.64°N 82.92°E

Kerakat
- Constituency No. 372 for the Uttar Pradesh Legislative Assembly

Constituency details
- Country: India
- Region: North India
- State: Uttar Pradesh
- District: Jaunpur
- Total electors: 4,16,720
- Reservation: SC

Member of Legislative Assembly
- 18th Uttar Pradesh Legislative Assembly
- Incumbent Toofani Saroj
- Party: Samajwadi Party
- Elected year: 2022

Kerakat is one of five assembly constituencies in the Machhlishahr Lok Sabha constituency. Since 2008, this assembly constituency is numbered 372 amongst 403 constituencies.

== Members of Legislative Assembly ==
Year	Member	Party
1957	Ram Samjhawan	Indian National Congress
1957	Lal Bahadur	Indian National Congress
1962	Ram Samjhawan	Indian National Congress
1967	Ram Samjhawan	Indian National Congress
1969	Ram Sagar	Bharatiya Jana Sangh
1974	Ram Samjhawan	Indian National Congress
1977	Shambhu Nath	Janata Party
1980	Ram Samjhawan	Indian National Congress (I)
1985	Gajraj Ram	Indian National Congress
1989	Raj Pati	Janata Dal
1991	Somaru Ram Saroj	Bharatiya Janata Party
1993	Jagarnath Chaudhary	Bahujan Samaj Party
1996	Ashok Sonker	Bharatiya Janata Party
2002	Somaru Ram Saroj	Bharatiya Janata Party
2007	Biraju Ram	Bahujan Samaj Party
2012	Gulab Chandra Saroj	Samajwadi Party
2017	Dinesh Choudhary	Bharatiya Janata Party
2022	Tufani Saroj	Samajwadi Party

== Election results ==
=== 2027 ===
2027 Uttar Pradesh Legislative Assembly election: Kerakat
Party	Candidate	Votes	%	±%
INDIA				
NDA				
BSP				
NOTA	None of the above			
Majority				
Turnout				
gain from		Swing		

=== 2022 ===
2022 Uttar Pradesh Legislative Assembly election: Kerakat
Party	Candidate	Votes	%	±%
SP	Toofani Saroj	94,022	39.13	+8.83
BJP	Dinesh Choudhary	84,178	35.04	−1.98
BSP	Dr. Lal Bahadur	51,633	21.49	−7.7
INC	Rajesh Gautam	2,688	1.12	
VIP	Pappu	2,590	1.08	
NOTA	None of the above	2,147	0.89	−0.25
Majority		9,844	4.09	−2.63
Turnout		240,258	57.65	−0.81
SP gain from BJP		Swing		

=== 2017 ===
Bharatiya Janta Party candidate Dinesh Choudhary, won in 2017 Uttar Pradesh Legislative Elections defeating Samajwadi Party candidate Sanjaj Saroj by a margin of 15,259 votes.

2017 Uttar Pradesh Legislative Assembly Election: Keraka
Party	Candidate	Votes	%	±%
BJP	Dinesh Chaudhary	84,078	37.02	
SP	Sanjai Kumar Saroj	68,819	30.3	
BSP	Urmila Raj	66,307	29.19	
Mahakranti Dal	Vijai	2,404	1.06	
NOTA	None of the above	2,557	1.14	
Majority		15,259	6.72	
Turnout		227,142	58.46	

== History ==
The first Member of Kerakat legislative Assembly is Lal Bahadur INC and Parmeshari INC.

== Ward/Area ==
Kerakat, Chandwak, Dobhi, Muftiganj, Huruhuri, Ratanupur, Parauganj, Thanagaddi Deokali, Itaili, Hebhal etc.

== Members of the Legislative Assembly ==
Election	Member	Party
1957	Ram Samjhawan	Indian National Congress
1957	Lal Bahadur	Indian National Congress
1962	Ram Samjhawan	Indian National Congress
1967	Ram Samjhawan	Indian National Congress
1969	Ram Sagar	Bharatiya Jana Sangh
1974	Ram Samjhawan	Indian National Congress
1977	Shambhu Nath	Janata party
1980	Ram Samjhawan	Indian National Congress
1985	Gajraj Ram	Indian National Congress
1989	Raj Pati	Janata Dal
1993	Jagarnath Chaudhary	Bahujan Samaj Party
1996	Ashok Sonker	Bharatiya Janata Party
2002	Somaru Ram	Bharatiya Janata Party
2007	Biraju Ram	Bahujan Samaj Party
2012	Gulab Chandra Saroj	Samajwadi Party
2017	Dinesh Chaudhary	Bharatiya Janata Party
2022	Tufani Saroj	Samajwadi Party

== See also ==
First Legislative Assembly of Uttar Pradesh
