= Deep Chandra Sonkar =

Indian politician

Member of Legislative Assembly Deep Chandra Sonkar
- In office 1985–1989
- Constituency: Shahganj (Assembly constituency)
- In office 1989–1994
- Constituency: Shahganj (Assembly constituency)

Personal details
- Born: Jaunpur
- Party: Samajwadi Party
- Spouse: Smt. Leena Sonkar
- Children: 3 ( including Divya Sonkar, Deveena Sonkar, Kunwar Dewal ) (Son in law - Kshitij Sonkar)
- Parent(s): Late. Buddhu Ram Sonkar, Late. Mahadevi Sonkar
- Profession: Politician

Deep Chandra Sonkar is an Indian politician who belonged to Lokdal (LKD), he is also known as "Sarkar" in Purvanchal. He was two times member of legislative assembly represented Shahganj (Assembly constituency), he is a social worker in his constituency, nearby area and in purvanchal. He won Shahganj assembly constituency elections with total votes of 21956 in 1985. In 1989, Sonkar joined Janata Dal and again won Shahganj assembly elections with total votes of 29707.He has also served as Labour Minister (UP) in 1989.

== Early life and education ==
Deep Chandra Sonkar was born into a farmer family in Jaunpur district. He secured his M.A and degree in Law from T.D College Jaunpur.

== Post held ==
Political title
Year	Post	Constituency
1985	Member of Legislative Assembly	Shahganj Constituency
1989	Labour Minister (State)	Shahganj Constituency

== See also ==
- Uttar Pradesh Legislative Assembly
