= Ajagara Assembly constituency =

Constituency of the Uttar Pradesh legislative assembly in India

Ajagara
- Constituency No. 385 for the Uttar Pradesh Legislative Assembly

Constituency details
- Country: India
- Region: North India
- State: Uttar Pradesh
- District: Varanasi
- Total electors: 310,116 (2012)
- Reservation: SC

Member of Legislative Assembly
- 18th Uttar Pradesh Legislative Assembly
- Incumbent Tribhuvan Ram
- Party: Bharatiya Janta Party
- Elected year: 2022

Ajagara is one of the 403 constituencies of the Uttar Pradesh Legislative Assembly, India. It is a part of the Varanasi district and one of the five assembly constituencies in the Chandauli Lok Sabha constituency. First assembly election in this assembly constituency was conducted in 2012 after the constituency came into existence in the year 2008 as a result of the "Delimitation of Parliamentary and Assembly Constituencies Order, 2008".

== Wards / Areas ==
Ajagara Assembly constituency comprises KCs Palahi Patti, Ajagara, PCs Dallipur, Rasulpur, Shahpur, Babatpur, Raisipatti, Surwa, Harhua, Birapatti, Koirajpur, Ausanpur, Undi, Sabhaipur, Ekla, Garwa, Paschimpur, Gauri, Parsadpur, Hathiwar, Puarikala, Puarikhurd & Bhopapur of Harahaua KC of Pindra Tehsil.

== Members of the Legislative Assembly ==
Year	Member	Party
Till 2012 : Constituency did not exist
2012	Tribhuvan Ram	Bahujan Samaj Party
2017	Kailash Nath Sonkar	Suheldev Bhartiya Samaj Party
2022	Tribhuvan Ram	Bharatiya Janata Party

== Election results ==
=== 2027 ===
2027 Uttar Pradesh Legislative Assembly election: Ajagara
Party	Candidate	Votes	%	±%
INDIA				
NDA				
BSP				
NOTA	None of the above			
Majority				
Turnout				
gain from		Swing		

=== 2022 ===
2022 Uttar Pradesh Legislative Assembly election: Ajagara
Party	Candidate	Votes	%	±%
BJP	Tribhuvan Ram	101,088	41.25	
SBSP	Sunil Sonkar	91,928	37.51	−0.6
BSP	Raghunath Chaudhari	42,301	17.26	−6.61
NOTA	None of the above	2,070	0.84	−0.24
Majority		9,160	3.74	−5.97
Turnout		245,074	65.52	+0.26
BJP gain from SBSP				

=== 2017 ===
2017 Uttar Pradesh Legislative Assembly election: Ajagara
Party	Candidate	Votes	%	±%
SBSP	Kailash Nath Sonkar	83,778	38.11	
SP	Lalji Sonkar	62,429	28.4	
BSP	Tribhuvan Ram	52,480	23.87	
Independent	Arti	8,639	3.93	
Independent	Saurabh Kumar	3,539	1.61	
NOTA	None of the above	2,350	1.08	
Majority		21,349	9.71	
Turnout		219,858	65.26	
SBSP gain from BSP		Swing		

=== 2012 ===
2012 Uttar Pradesh Legislative Assembly election: Ajagara
Party	Candidate	Votes	%	±%
BSP	Tribhuvan Ram	60,239	32.35	−
SP	Lalji	58,156	31.23	−
BJP	Harinath	22,855	12.27	−
	Remainder eighteen candidates	44,964	24.15	−
Majority		2,083	1.12	−
Turnout		186,214	60.05	−
BSP hold		Swing	-	

== See also ==
- Chandauli district
- List of constituencies of the Uttar Pradesh Legislative Assembly
