= Priya Saroj =

Indian politician (born 1998)

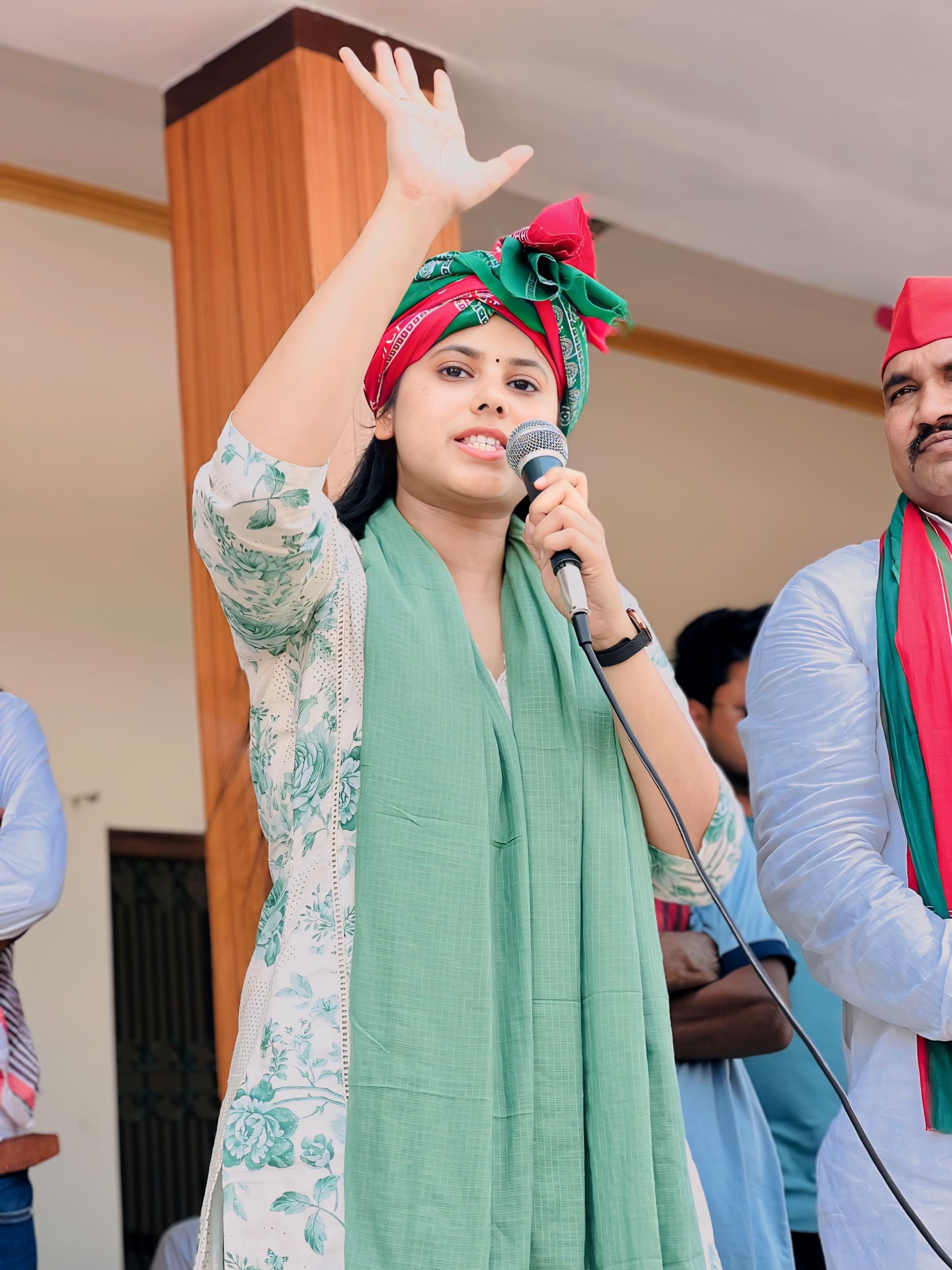
- Priya Saroj | MP Machhlishahr

Member of Parliament, Lok Sabha
- Incumbent
- Assumed office 4 June 2024
- Preceded by: B. P. Saroj
- Majority: 35,850
- Constituency: Machhlishahr

Personal details
- Born: 23 November 1998 (age 27) Varanasi, Uttar Pradesh, India
- Citizenship: Indian
- Party: Samajwadi Party
- Domestic partner: Rinku Singh
- Parent: Tufani Saroj (father)
- Education: University of Delhi (BA); Amity University, Noida (LLB)
- Occupation: Politician; Lawyer

Priya Saroj (born 23 November 1998) is an Indian politician and lawyer from Uttar Pradesh. She was elected as the Member of Parliament for Machhlishahr Lok Sabha constituency which is reserved for Scheduled Caste community. She was elected in the 2024 Indian general election in Uttar Pradesh representing the Samajwadi Party.

== Personal life and education ==
Priya Saroj was born on 23 November 1998 in Karkhiyaon village, Varanasi district, Uttar Pradesh. She is the daughter of Tufani Saroj, a three-time MP and current MLA from Kerakat in Uttar Pradesh.

She completed her schooling at the Air Force Golden Jubilee Institute in New Delhi. She then pursued higher education by earning a Bachelor of Arts (BA) degree from Delhi University. Her academic journey continued with a Bachelor of Laws (LLB) degree from Amity University, Noida, Uttar Pradesh. She practices in the Supreme Court.

=== Engagement with cricketer Rinku Singh ===
She got engaged to Indian cricketer Rinku Singh on 8 June 2025. Rinku Singh, from Aligarh, UP, played for Kolkata Knight riders in the IPL and they were connected through a common friend and later, it became an arranged affair with both families accepting them. Former Chief minister Akhilesh Yadav attended the engagement along with his wife and MP Dimple Yadav. Actress Jaya Bachchan and cricketer Bhuvneshwar Kumar were also present. The marriage which was initially fixed for November at Taj Hotel in Varanasi, is now postponed and is now reportedly scheduled for February 2026.

== Political career ==
Saroj was elected as a Member of Parliament from Machhlishahr Lok Sabha constituency in 2024 Indian general election in Uttar Pradesh representing the Samajwadi Party. The constituency is combined in two districts, Jaunpur and Varanasi. She polled 451,292 votes and defeated her nearest rival, B. P. Saroj of the Bharatiya Janata Party, by a margin of 35,850 votes. She become the second youngest candidate to be elected to the Lok Sabha in 2024.
