= Laxminarain Mani Tripathi =

Indian Politician

Member of Parliament, Lok Sabha
- In office 1991–1996
- Preceded by: Rudra Sen Chaudhary
- Succeeded by: Beni Prasad Verma
- Constituency: Kaiserganj

Personal details
- Born: 1 January 1940; Bahraich, Uttar Pradesh
- Died: 19 June 2005 (aged 65); Lucknow, Uttar Pradesh
- Political party: Bharatiya Janata Party
- Spouse: Chandrakanti Mani Tripathi (m. 1957)
- Children: 1 son, 1 daughter
- Parent: Satya Dev Mani Tripathi (father)
- Education: Bachelor of Ayurveda, Medicine and Surgery
- Alma mater: Akhil Bharatiya Ayurved Vidyapeeth, Delhi
- Profession: Businessman, Politician

Laxminarain Mani Tripathi (1940–2005) was an Indian politician from Uttar Pradesh who had represented Kaiserganj in the Lok Sabha from 1991 to 1996.
