= Tribhuvan Ram =

Indian politician (born 1949)

Member of Uttar Pradesh Legislative Assembly
- Incumbent
- Assumed office 10 March 2022
- Preceded by: Kailash Nath Sonkar
- Constituency: Ajagara
- In office 15 March 2012 – 19 March 2017
- Preceded by: Position established
- Succeeded by: Kailash Nath Sonkar
- Constituency: Ajagara

Personal details
- Born: 15 January 1949 (age 77) Jaunpur, United Provinces, India
- Party: Bhartiya Janta Party (2019–present)
- Other political affiliations: Bahujan Samaj Party (2012–2019)
- Spouse: Snehlata (m. 1978)
- Children: 2
- Education: Indian Institute of Technology (BHU) Varanasi
- Occupation: Politician
- Profession: Engineer

Tribhuvan Ram (born 15 January 1949) is an Indian politician and member of the 18th Legislative Assembly of Uttar Pradesh as a Bharatiya Janata Party candidate representing Ajagara constituency of Uttar Pradesh. He was a member of the 16th Legislative Assembly from 2012 to 2017 as a Bahujan Samaj Party representative.

== Personal life ==
Tribhuvan Ram was born to K. B. Ram in Jaunpur, Uttar Pradesh on 15 January 1949. He holds an engineering degree from Indian Institute of Technology (BHU) Varanasi. Ram married Snehlata on 28 November 1978, with whom he has two sons.

== Political career ==
Ram has been a MLA for two terms. He represented Ajagara as a member of the Bahujan Samaj Party in the Sixteenth Legislative Assembly of Uttar Pradesh.

In the 2017 election, Ram lost to Kailash Nath Sonkar of Suheldev Bhartiya Samaj Party. After which, Ram joined Bharatiya Janta Party on 6 December 2019.

In the 2022 Uttar Pradesh Legislative Assembly election, Ram again won from Ajagara with 101,088 votes, succeeding Sonkar in the process.

== Posts held ==
#	From	To	Position	Comments
01	2012	2017	Member, 16th Legislative Assembly	
02	2022	present	Member, 18th Legislative Assembly	

== See also ==
- Uttar Pradesh Legislative Assembly
