= Vidyasagar Sonkar =

Indian politician

Member of Parliament, Rajya Sabha
- Incumbent
- Assumed office 26 November 2026
- Preceded by: Neeraj Shekhar

Member of the Uttar Pradesh Legislative Council
- In office 2018–2024

Member of Parliament, Lok Sabha
- In office 1996-1998
- Preceded by: Rajnath Sonkar Shastri
- Succeeded by: Bizay Sonkar Shastri
- Constituency: Saidpur, Uttar Pradesh

Personal details
- Born: 21 July 1961 (age 65) Sukhipur, Uttar Pradesh, India
- Party: Bharatiya Janata Party
- Spouse: Rekha Sonkar
- Children: One daughter

Vidyasagar Sonkar is an Indian politician. He was elected to the Rajya Sabha, the upper house of the Parliament of India from Uttar Pradesh in October 2026. He is a former Member of the Lok Sabha, the lower house of the Parliament of India from Saidpur, Uttar Pradesh as a member of the Bharatiya Janata Party.

He is a former member of the Uttar Pradesh Legislative Council and former State General Secretary of BJP in Uttar Pradesh. In the elections on 19 April 2018, BJP won 11 out of 13 seats and the remaining two were won by Samajwadi Party and Bahujan Samaj Party each.
