= Ganapati Ram =

Indian politician (1926–1985)

Ganpati Ram

Member of Parliament, Lok Sabha
- In office 1952–1967
- Succeeded by: Nageshwar Dwivedi
- Constituency: Machhlishahr, Uttar Pradesh

Personal details
- Born: 26 July 1926 Nimaich, Kuar, Banaras, United Provinces, British India (present-day Uttar Pradesh, India)
- Died: 3 April 1985 (aged 58) Jaunpur, Uttar Pradesh, India
- Party: Indian National Congress
- Spouse: Manarawati Devi
- Children: Dr. Vijay Pratap Singh, Saroj Bala, Abhai Pratap Singh, Surendra Pratap Singh

Ganapati Ram (26 July 1926 – 3 April 1985) was an Indian politician. He was elected to the Lok Sabha, the lower house of the Parliament of India from the Machhlishahr, Uttar Pradesh as a member of the Indian National Congress.

Ram died on 3 April 1985, at the age of 58.
