= Shailendra Yadav Lalai =

Indian politician (born 1965)

Member of Legislative Assembly, Uttar Pradesh
- Incumbent
- Assumed office March 2012
- Preceded by: Jagdish Sonkar
- Succeeded by: Ramesh Singh
- Constituency: Shahganj (Assembly constituency)

Minister of State for Energy & Planning Government of Uttar Pradesh
- In office 2015–2017
- Chief Minister: Akhilesh Yadav
- Succeeded by: Swatantra Dev Singh

Member of Legislative Assembly Khutahan, Jaunpur
- In office February 2002 – March 2012 (2 Times)
- Preceded by: Umakant Yadav
- Succeeded by: Constituency abolished

Minister of State for Public Welfare & Housing Government of Uttar Pradesh
- In office 2003–2007
- Chief Minister: Mulayam Singh Yadav

Personal details
- Born: 1 July 1965 (age 61) Pakhanpur, Jaunpur, Uttar Pradesh
- Party: Samajwadi Party
- Other political affiliations: Bahujan Samaj Party
- Children: 2 Siddharth Yadav Shivendra Yadav
- Parent: Talukdar Yadav
- Education: Gorakhpur University
- Profession: Agriculture

Shailendra Yadav Lalai is an Indian politician and former Member of Legislative Assembly (MLA) from Shahganj constituency in Jaunpur district of Uttar Pradesh, India. He was elected as a member of Legislative Assembly, Uttar Pradesh consecutively for the fourth time. He was the Minister of State for Energy and Planning in the previous Samajwadi Party (SP) government led by the then Chief Minister Akhilesh Yadav. The national president of Samajwadi Party (SP) and former Chief Minister of Uttar Pradesh Akhilesh Yadav has appointed him as the opposition's deputy Chief Whip in the current (17th) Legislative Assembly of Uttar Pradesh. He is believed to be a close ally of Akhilesh Yadav and the latter counts on him a lot.

== Early life and education ==
Shailendra Yadav 'Lalai', who has earned the reputation of an effective, disciplined and humanitarian leader, was born on 1 July 1965 in the Pakhanpur village of Jaunpur district in Uttar Pradesh. He shares his birthday with the Samajwadi Party's chief and former Chief Minister of Uttar Pradesh, Akhilesh Yadav. The father of Shailendra Yadav Lalai was a farmer and a respected figure in the area because of his erudition and gentle behaviour. A graduate of Gorakhpur University, Lalai was very much fascinated by social service and politics since his early college days.

== Political career ==
After entering in active politics from social service in the decade of 80s, Lalai emerged in Uttar Pradesh political canvas in the year 1985 when he was appointed member of the state executive of Lokdal's youth wing, 'Yuva Lokdal'. In 1988, opposition parties like Lokdal, Jan Morcha and others joined hands together under the leadership of Babu Vishwanath Pratap Singh to form Janata Dal and in 1991 Shailendra Yadav Lalai was appointed the General Secretary of Yuva Janata Dal, Uttar Pradesh with a responsibility to bring the youth closer to the party.

Lalai Yadav soon established himself as the young leader of Janata Party. Janata Party fielded him as their candidate from the Khutahan assembly constituency of Jaunpur district in 1993 general assembly elections, in which he lost. It was the time when Mayawati was rising on the political landscape of Uttar Pradesh as a brand new voice of backwards and dalits. Lalai switched to BSP. In the general assembly elections held in 2002, Mayawati fielded him from the same Khutahan assembly constituency where he lost the battle in 1993 but he won the election this time by defeating the sitting MLA, Umakant Yadav. Since then he has been elected to the Legislative Assembly of Uttar Pradesh to the same seat for the fourth time.

It is believed that in 2003, Shailendra Yadav 'Lalai' played a crucial role in dethroning Mayawati from power and paving the way for Samajwadi Party to form the government in the state. This episode left a strong impression of his leadership abilities and growing stature in politics on Mulayam Singh Yadav, the then Chief Minister of Uttar Pradesh and he rewarded him by giving him the position of a minister of state in his cabinet. He was allotted the department of Public Welfare and Housing in Mulayam Singh Yadav cabinet.

Shailendra Yadav 'Lalai' served again as a Minister of state for Energy and Planning in Akhilesh Yadav government in Uttar Pradesh between 2015- 2017. In latest Uttar Pradesh Assembly election held in 2017, he was Samajwadi Party candidate and defeated his close contestant Rana Ajit Pratap Singh of Suheldev Bharatiya Samaj Party by a margin of more than nine thousand votes.

He is known for the works he has done during his tenure as a Minister of state for Energy and Planning that includes implementing a new power supply schedule to ensure 24x7 power supply for all cities of Uttar Pradesh, India.

== Important posts held ==
Sl.	Year	Party/Govt.	Position
1.	1985	Yuva Lokdal	Member, State Executive, Uttar Pradesh
2.	1991	Yuva Janata Dal	General Secretary, Uttar Pradesh
3.	2002	Bahujan Samaj Party	MLA from Khutahan, Jaunpur (Uttar Pradesh)
4.	2003-07	Samajwadi Party / Govt. of Uttar Pradesh	Minister of State for Public Welfare and Housing
5.	2007	Samajwadi Party	MLA from Khutahan, Jaunpur (Uttar Pradesh)
6.	2012	Samajwadi Party	MLA from Shahganj, Jaunpur (Uttar Pradesh)
7.	2015-17	Samajwadi Party / Govt. of Uttar Pradesh	Minister of State for Energy and Planning
8.	2017	Samajwadi Party	MLA from Shahganj, Jaunpur (Uttar Pradesh)

== See also ==
- Uttar Pradesh Legislative Assembly
