= R.K. Patel =

Indian politician

Rabindra Kumar Patel (born 1970) is an Indian politician affiliated with the Apna Dal (Sonelal) party. He has a master's degree in Medical (MBBS MS) from IMS-BHU at Varanasi.

He was elected as a Member of the Legislative Assembly for the Mariyahu constituency of the Legislature of Uttar Pradesh in Jaunpur in 2022.
