= Machhlishahr Assembly constituency =

Constituency of the Uttar Pradesh legislative assembly in India

Coordinates: 25.69°N 82.41°E

Machhlishahr
- Constituency No. 369 for the Uttar Pradesh Legislative Assembly

Constituency details
- Country: India
- Region: North India
- State: Uttar Pradesh
- District: Jaunpur
- Total electors: 4,02,078
- Reservation: SC

Member of Legislative Assembly
- 18th Uttar Pradesh Legislative Assembly
- Incumbent Ragini Sonkar
- Party: Samajwadi Party
- Elected year: 2022

Machhlishahr is a constituency of the Uttar Pradesh Legislative Assembly covering the city of Machhlishahr in the Jaunpur district of Uttar Pradesh, India.

Machhlishahr is one of five assembly constituencies in the Machhlishahr Lok Sabha constituency. Since 2008, this assembly constituency is numbered 369 amongst 403 constituencies.

== Members of the Legislative Assembly ==
Year	Member	Party
1957	Mohammed Rauf Jafri	Indian National Congress
1962	Kesari Prasad	Praja Socialist Party
1967	Mohammed Rauf Jafri	Indian National Congress
1969	Moti Lal	Bharatiya Kranti Dal
1974	Agha Zaidi	Indian National Congress
1977	Arun Kumar	Indian National Congress
1980	Keshri Prasad	Indian National Congress (I)
1985	Keshri Prasad	Indian National Congress
1989	Jwala Prasad Yadav	Janata Dal
1991	Jwala Prasad Yadav	Janata Dal
1993	Jwala Prasad Yadav	Janata Dal
1996	Jwala Prasad Yadav	Samajwadi Party
2002	Vinod Kumar Singh	Bahujan Samaj Party
2007	Subhash Pandey	Bahujan Samaj Party
2012	Jagdish Sonkar	Samajwadi Party
2017	Jagdish Sonkar	Samajwadi Party
2022	Ragini Sonkar	Samajwadi Party

== Election results ==
=== 2027 ===
2027 Uttar Pradesh Legislative Assembly election: Machhlishahr
Party	Candidate	Votes	%	±%
INDIA				
NDA				
BSP				
NOTA	None of the above			
Majority				
Turnout				
gain from		Swing		

=== 2022 ===
2022 Uttar Pradesh Legislative Assembly election: Machhlishahr
Party	Candidate	Votes	%	±%
SP	Ragini Sonkar	91,659	41.99	▲7.26
BJP	Mihilal Gautam	83,175	38.1	▲5.37
BSP	Vijay Kumar	35,059	16.06	▼9.28
INC	Mala Devi Sonkar	2,178	1.0	
NOTA	None of the above	1,198	0.55	▼0.5
Majority		8,484	3.89	▲1.89
Turnout		218,312	54.3	▼2.76
SP hold		Swing		

=== 2017 ===
Samajwadi Party candidate Jagdish Sonkar won in 2017 Uttar Pradesh Legislative Elections defeating Bharatiya Janta Party candidate Anita Rawat by a margin of 4,179 votes.

2017 General Elections: Machhlishahr
Party	Candidate	Votes	%	±%
SP	Jagdish Sonkar	72,368	34.73	
BJP	Anita Rawat	68,189	32.73	
BSP	Sushila Saroj	52,796	25.34	
NISHAD	Ram Sevak	4,484	2.15	
NOTA	None of the above	2,165	1.05	
Majority		4,179	2.0	
Turnout		208,344	57.06	
SP hold		Swing		
