= Bishunpur, Jaunpur =

Bishunpur
- Village
- Location within Uttar Pradesh
- Country: India
- State: Uttar Pradesh
- District: Jaunpur district
- Nagar panchayat: Shahganj
- Elevation: 811 m (2,661 ft)
- Time zone: UTC+5.30 (IST)
- Post code: 223103
- Area code: 91-05453(telephone)
- Parliament Constituency: Jaunpur
- Assembly Constituency: Shahganj

Bishunpur is a village and postal address in Shahganj, Jaunpur district in the state of Uttar Pradesh, India.
