= Machhlishahr =

Town in Uttar Pradesh, India

- Town
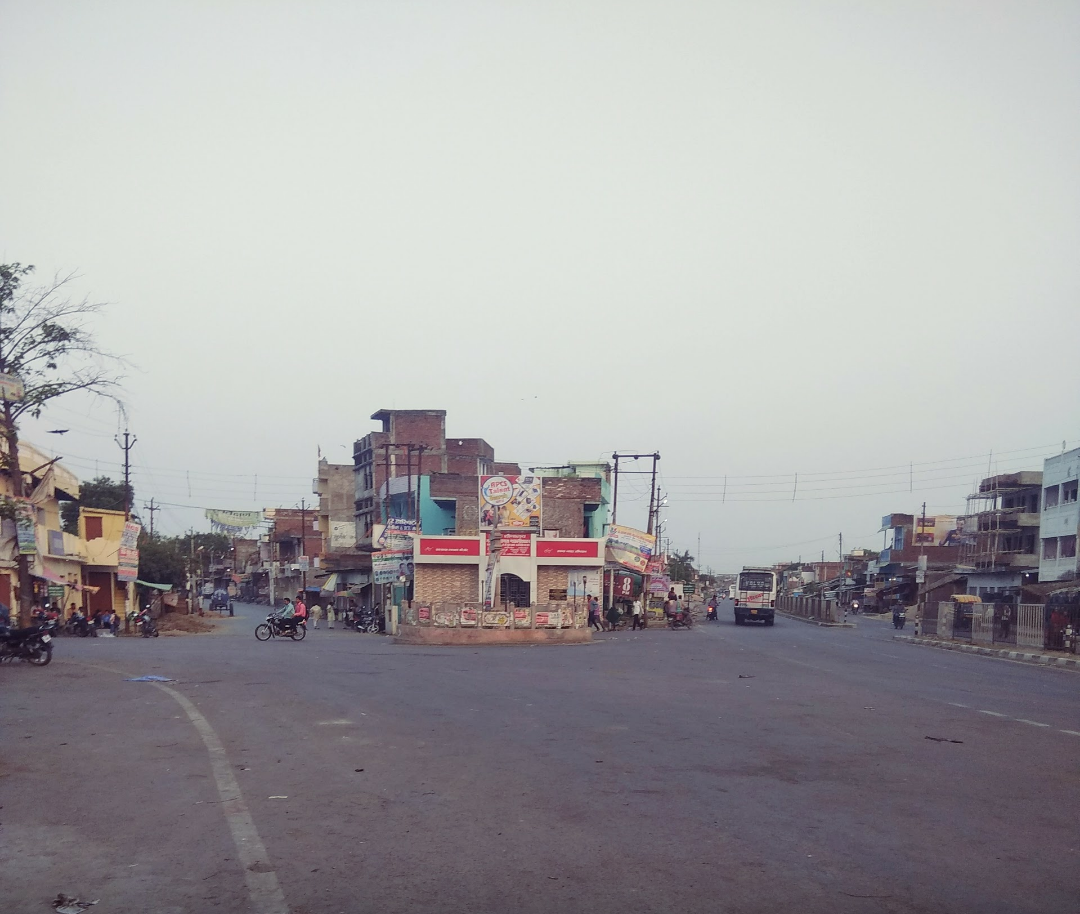
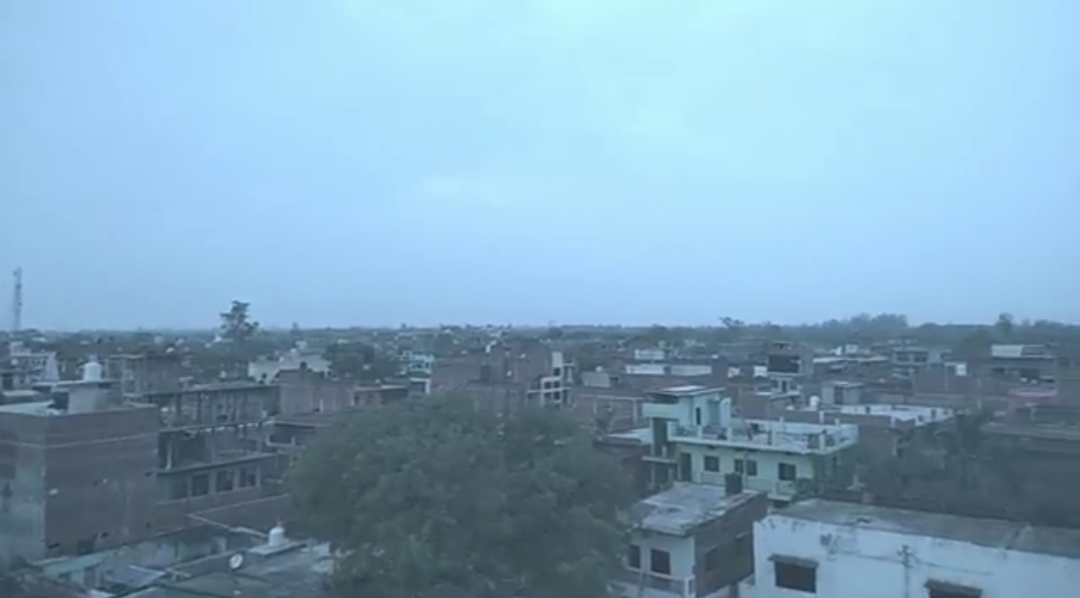

- Location in Uttar Pradesh, India Machhlishahr (India)
- Coordinates: 25.68°N 82.42°E
- Country: India
- State: Uttar Pradesh
- District: Jaunpur

Government
  - Body: Nagar panchayat
  - MLA: Ragini Sonkar

Area
  - Total: 5.37 km^{2} (2.07 sq mi)
- Elevation: 84 m (276 ft)

Population (2011)
  - Total: 26,107
  - Density: 4,860/km^{2} (12,600/sq mi)

Language
  - Official: Hindi
  - Additional official: Urdu
- Time zone: UTC+5:30 (IST)
- Postal code: 222143
- Vehicle registration: UP-62

Machhlishahr is a town in Jaunpur district in the Indian state of Uttar Pradesh. It is situated 30 km west of district headquarters Jaunpur. NH-231 passes through the city. Machhlishahr – Janghai NH-731B – Bhadohi four-lane national highway is under construction which will boost the economy of the region. Machhlishahr is a Nagar panchayat and there has been a longstanding demand for making it a Nagar palika parishad. In 2020, Machhalisahar nagar panchayat has secured 33rd all India rank in Swachh Survekshan (cleanliness survey).

== Geography ==
Machhlishahr is located at 25.68°N 82.42°E. It has an average elevation of 84 metres (275 feet). It has been assigned 222143 pincode by Indian postal services.

== Demographics ==
Religions in Machhlishahr (2011)
Religion	Percent
Hindus	44.26%
Muslims	55.34%
Christians	0.23%
Sikhs	0.01%
Others	0.16%
Distribution of religions

=== Population ===
As of 2011 Indian Census, Machhlishahr had a total population of 26,107, of which 13,284 were males and 12,823 were females. Population within the age group of 0 to 6 years was 3,886. The total number of literates in Machhlishahr was 17,205, which constituted 65.9% of the population with male literacy of 71.0% and female literacy of 60.6%. The effective literacy rate of 7+ population of Machhlishahr was 77.4%, of which male literacy rate was 83.8% and female literacy rate was 70.9%. The Scheduled Castes population was 1,841. Machhlishahr had 3740 households in 2011.

As of 2001 India census, Machhlishahr had a population of 22‚943. Males constitute 51.5% of the population and females 48.5%. Literacy rate in Machhlishahr city is 58.3%.

=== Religion ===
A little more than half of the population follow Islam, with the rest being followers of Hinduism.

== Notable people ==
- Salaam Machhalishahari, Indian Urdu-language Ghazal and Nazm writer
- Mata Prasad, former Governor, Arunachal Pradesh

== See also ==
- Achakari
