= Jagdish Sonkar =

Indian politician (born 1967)

Member of the Uttar Pradesh Legislative Assembly
- In office 2012–2022
- Preceded by: Subhash Pandey
- Succeeded by: Ragini Sonkar
- Constituency: Machhali Shahar
- In office 2002 - 2012
- Preceded by: Bankey Lal Sonkar
- Succeeded by: Shailendra Yadav Lalai
- Constituency: Shahganj

Personal details
- Born: 1 September 1967 (age 59) Dhanupur, Jaunpur, Uttar Pradesh, India
- Party: Samajwadi Party
- Spouse: Geeta Sonkar (m. 1986)
- Children: 1
- Education: Sampurnanand Sanskrit Vishwavidyalaya
- Occupation: MLA
- Profession: Politician; agriculturalist; industrialist

Jagdish Sonkar (born 1 September 1967) is an Indian politician and a member of 14th, 15th, 16th & 17th Legislative Assembly, Uttar Pradesh of India. He represents the Machhlishahr constituency in Jaunpur district of Uttar Pradesh.

== Personal life ==
Sonkar was born on 1 September 1967 to Dayaram Sonkar in Dhanupur of Jaunpur district of Uttar Pradesh. He graduated from Sampurnanand Sanskrit Vishwavidyalaya. He married Geet Sonkar on 23 May 1986, with whom he has a son. He is an agriculturalist and industrialist by profession.

== Political career ==
Jagdish Sonkar contested Uttar Pradesh Assembly Election as Samajwadi Party candidate and defeated his close contestant Anita Rawat from Bharatiya Janata Party with a margin of 4,179 votes.

== Posts held ==
#	From	To	Position	Constituency
1.	March 2002	March 2007	Member, 14th Legislative Assembly	Shahganj
2.	March 2007.	March 2012	Member, 15th Legislative Assembly	Shahganj
3.	March 2012	March 2017	Member, 16th Legislative Assembly	Machhalishahar
4.	2017	2022	Member, 17th Legislative Assembly	Machhalishahar
