= Sheo Sharan Verma =

Indian politician (1925–2010)

Member of Parliament, Lok Sabha
- In office 1989–1996
- Preceded by: Sripati Mishra
- Succeeded by: Ram Vilas Vedanti
- In office 1980–1984
- Preceded by: Raj Keshar Singh
- Succeeded by: Sripati Mishra
- Constituency: Machhlishahr, Uttar Pradesh

Personal details
- Born: 9 January 1925 Ramaipur, Pratapgarh, United Provinces, British India (present-day Uttar Pradesh, India)
- Died: 27 January 2010 (aged 85) Allahabad, Uttar Pradesh, India
- Party: Janata Dal
- Profession: Politician

Sheo Sharan Verma (9 January 1925 – 27 January 2010) was an Indian politician. He was elected to the Lok Sabha the lower house of Indian Parliament from Machhlishahr in Uttar Pradesh in 1980,1989 and 1991 as a member of the Janata Dal.

Verma died in Allahabad on 27 January 2010, at the age of 85.
