= Achakari =

Coordinates: 25.8081°N 82.2177°E

Achakari is a village in Garwara, Uttar Pradesh, India.
