= Leena Tiwari =

Indian politician

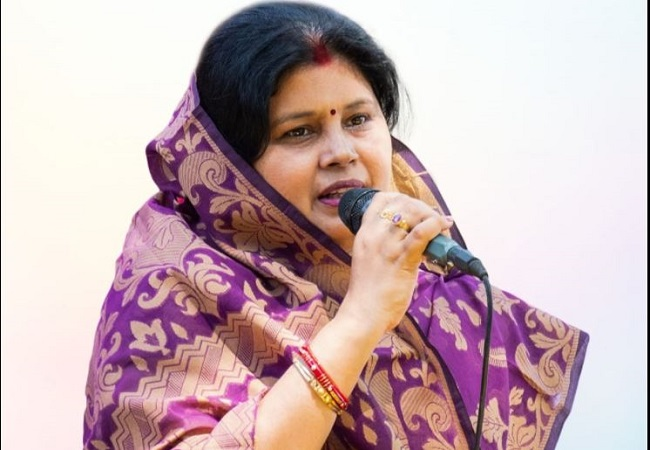

MLA, 17th Legislative Assembly
- In office 2017–2022
- Preceded by: Rajkishor Tiwari
- Succeeded by: Engg Satvik Tiwari
- Constituency: Mariyahu, Jaunpur district

Personal details
- Party: Apna Dal (Sonelal)
- Occupation: MLA
- Profession: Politician

Leena Tiwari is an Indian politician and a member of 17th Legislative Assembly of Mariyahu, Uttar Pradesh of India. She represents the Mariyahu constituency of Uttar Pradesh and is a member of the Apna Dal (Sonelal) party.

== Political career ==
She has been a member of the 17th Legislative Assembly of Uttar Pradesh. Since 2017, she has represented the Mariyahu constituency and is a member of the AD(S).

== Posts held ==
#	From	To	Position	Comments
01	2017	Incumbent	Member, 17th Legislative Assembly	

== See also ==
- Uttar Pradesh Legislative Assembly
