= Ragini Sonkar =

Indian politician

Member of the Uttar Pradesh Legislative Assembly
- Incumbent
- Assumed office 10 March 2022
- Preceded by: Jagdish Sonkar
- Constituency: Machhlishahr

Personal details
- Born: 11 December 1990 (age 35) Varanasi, Uttar Pradesh, India
- Party: Samajwadi Party
- Spouse: Sambit Malik (m. 2020)
- Parent: Kailash Nath Sonkar (father)
- Education: R. G. Kar Medical College and Hospital, Kolkata (MBBS); All India Institute of Medical Sciences, New Delhi (MD)
- Profession: Physician

Ragini Sonkar (born 11 December 1990) is an Indian physician and politician serving as a member of the 18th Legislative Assembly of Uttar Pradesh from Machhlishahr representing the Samajwadi Party. She is the daughter of politician Kailash Nath Sonkar.

== Personal life ==
Sonkar was born to politician Kailash Nath Sonkar in Varanasi, Uttar Pradesh on 11 December 1990. She did her MBBS from R. G. Kar Medical College and Hospital, Kolkata, where she worked briefly, and then completed Doctor of Medicine with specialisation in Ophthalmology from All India Institute of Medical Sciences, New Delhi. Sonkar married Sambit Malik, a physician on 4 February 2020.

== Political career ==
In the 2022 Uttar Pradesh Legislative Assembly election, Sonkar represented Samajwadi Party as a candidate from Machhlishahr constituency and went on to defeat Bharatiya Janata Party's Mehilal Gautam by a margin of 8,484 votes, succeeding own party member Jagdish Sonkar in the process.
