= Rajnath Sonkar Shastri =

Indian politician

Member of Parliament, Lok Sabha
- In office 1980-1984
- Preceded by: Ram Sagar
- Succeeded by: Ram Samujhavan
- In office 1991-1996
- Preceded by: Ram Sagar
- Succeeded by: Vidyasagar Sonkar
- Constituency: Saidpur, Uttar Pradesh

Personal details
- Born: 9 January 1939 (age 87) Varanasi
- Party: Janata Dal
- Spouse: Meena Sonkar
- Relations: Bizay Sonkar Shastri (younger brother)
- Children: 4
- As of Chairperson of All Indian Khatik Samaj Source

Rajnath Sonkar Shastri is an Indian politician. He was elected to the Lok Sabha, the lower house of the Parliament of India from the Saidpur, Uttar Pradesh as a member of the Janata Dal.
