= Shahganj Assembly constituency =

Constituency of the Uttar Pradesh legislative assembly in India

Coordinates: 26.06°N 82.68°E

Shahganj
- Constituency No. 365 for the Uttar Pradesh Legislative Assembly

Constituency details
- Country: India
- Region: North India
- State: Uttar Pradesh
- District: Jaunpur
- Total electors: 4,07,439
- Reservation: None

Member of Legislative Assembly
- 18th Uttar Pradesh Legislative Assembly
- Incumbent Ramesh Singh
- Party: NISHAD
- Alliance: NDA
- Elected year: 2022

Shahganj is a constituency of the Uttar Pradesh Legislative Assembly covering the city of Shahganj in the Jaunpur district of Uttar Pradesh, India.

Shahganj is one of five assembly constituencies in the Jaunpur Lok Sabha constituency. Since 2008, this assembly constituency is numbered 365 amongst 403 constituencies.

== Members of the Legislative Assembly ==
Year	Member	Party
1952	Lakshmi Shankar Yadav	Indian National Congress
1952	Babu Nandan	Indian National Congress
1957	Kunwar Sripal	Independent
1957	Mata Prasad	Indian National Congress
1962	Lakshmi Shankar Yadav	Indian National Congress
1967	Mata Prasad	Indian National Congress
1969	Mata Prasad	Indian National Congress
1974	Mata Prasad	Indian National Congress
1977	Chhotey Lal	Janata Party
1980	Pahlwan	Indian National Congress (I)
1985	Deep Chand Sonkar	Lokdal
1989	Deep Chand Sonkar	Janata Dal
1991	Ram Paras Rajak	Bharatiya Janata Party
1993	Ram Dawar	Bahujan Samaj Party
1996	Bankey Lal Sonkar	Bharatiya Janata Party
2002	Jagdish Sonkar	Samajwadi Party
2007	Jagdish Sonkar	Samajwadi Party
2012	Shailendra Yadav Lalai	Samajwadi Party
2017	Shailendra Yadav Lalai	Samajwadi Party
2022	Ramesh Singh	NISHAD Party

== Election results ==
=== 2027 ===
2027 Uttar Pradesh Legislative Assembly election: Shahganj
Party	Candidate	Votes	%	±%
INDIA				
NDA				
BSP				
NOTA	None of the above			
Majority				
Turnout				
gain from		Swing		

=== 2022 ===
2022 Uttar Pradesh Legislative Assembly election: Shahganj
Party	Candidate	Votes	%	±%
NISHAD	Ramesh Singh	87,233	36.21	+26.2
SP	Shailendra Yadav Lalai	86,514	35.91	+4.26
BSP	Indar Dev	48,957	20.32	−3.57
AIMIM	Nayab Ahmad Khan	8,128	3.37	
VIP	Ramanuj	2,551	1.06	
NOTA	None of the above	1,643	0.68	−0.01
Majority		719	0.3	−3.97
Turnout		240,920	59.13	−1.82
NISHAD gain from SP		Swing		

=== 2017 ===
Samajwadi Party candidate Shailendra Yadav Lalai, won in the 2017 Uttar Pradesh Legislative Elections defeating Suheldev Bharatiya Samaj Party candidate Rana Ajeet Pratap Singh by a margin of 9,162 votes.

2017 Uttar Pradesh Legislative Assembly Election: Shahgan
Party	Candidate	Votes	%	±%
SP	Shailendra Yadav Lalai	67,818	31.65	
SBSP	Rana Ajeet Pratap Singh	58,656	27.38	
BSP	Om Prakash(O.P. Singh)	51,176	23.89	
NISHAD	Dr. Suryabhan Yadav	21,446	10.01	
RLD	Dinesh Yadav Alias Dinesh Kant	6,462	3.02	
NOTA	None of the above	1,473	0.69	
Majority		9,162	4.27	
Turnout		214,243	60.95	
