= Bizay Sonkar Shastri =

Indian politician

Dr. Vijay Sonkar Shastri

National Spokesperson of Bharatiya Janata Party
- In office 2004

Member of Parliament, Lok Sabha
- In office 1998–1999
- Constituency: Saidpur

Personal details
- Born: 24 September 1959 (age 67) Varanasi, Uttar Pradesh
- Party: Bharatiya Janata Party
- Spouse: Suman Sonkar Shastri
- Relations: Rajnath Sonkar Shastri (brother)
- Children: 2
- Parent(s): Shivlal Sonkar (father); Munni Devi (mother)
- Education: Banaras Hindu University
- Profession: Politician, Writer
- Website: drbizaysonkarshastri.com

Bizay Sonkar Shastri (born 24 September 1959) is an Indian politician from Bharatiya Janata Party.

== Personal life ==
Born to Shivlal Sonkar and Munni Devi on 24 September 1959 in Varanasi, Uttar Pradesh, Bizay had four brothers and four sisters; his elder brother Shri Rajnath Sonkar is a member of parliament. He is married to Dr. Suman Sonkar Shastri and has two sons.

Shastri ji spent his early years of life in Varanasi, Uttar Pradesh, where he completed his primary education from Central Hindu Boys School and intermediate from National Inter College. After this, he completed his master's degree from the Banaras Hindu University.

== Political career ==
He was elected to Lok Sabha from Saidpur in 1998 elections and was subsequently chosen as the chairman of ST/SC Commission (Government of India). In 2004, he was appointed the vice-chairman of National SC/ST front (BJP) and was elected as the National Executive Member of Bharatiya Janata Party in 2008.
