= Jaunpur–Bhojpur War =

Military conflict in Bihar

Date	1399–1457
Location	Bhojpuri region
Result	Jaunpur victory: By the late 1400s, many Parmar Ujjainiyas had begun paying tribute to the Jaunpur, as the Paramara chief Durlabh Deva had accepted Jaunpur’s suzerainty.

Belligerents
Jaunpur Sultanate	Ujjainiyas of Bhojpur

Commanders and leaders
Malik Sarwar; Ibrahim Shah; Mahmud Shah	Raja Har Raj †; Gaj Raj; Dev Raj; Jagdeo # Sangram Deo; Ishwari Singh †

The Jaunpur–Bhojpur War, also known as the Sharqi–Ujjainiya War, refers to the military conflict between the Jaunpur Sultanate and the Ujjainiya Paramaras of the Bhojpur region of Bihar and Purvanchal.

After their defeat by Malik Sarwar, the Ujjainiyas retreated into the hills and forests and continued to harass the forces of the Jaunpur Sultanate by using guerrilla warfare. After the death of Sultan Malik Sarwar in 1399, many Ujjainiyas felt it safe to return from living in the forest. However, for certain periods throughout the 1400s, many Ujjainiyas had to return to living in the forests.

== Background ==
According to the seventeenth-century khyat which contains the history of the Ujjainiyas, noted that in 1389, the sultan of Jaunpur crossed the Karmanasa River and halted in Buxar which is a holy city in Hinduism and received a lot of pilgrims. His main motivation for advancing to this position was that he coveted control of the ferry of Chausa. Upon their arrival, they noticed Brahmins performing prayers and rituals. They proceeded to disturb and interfere with the rituals which drew the attention of the Ujjainiyas. The Ujjainiyas were initially successful in driving the Jaunpur Sultanate out of the region however they later returned plundered the city, destroying the temples in the process.

== Conflicts ==
=== Under Malik Sarwar ===
In May 1394, Malik Sarwar was appointed governor of Jaunpur province stretching from Kannauj to Bihar. In 1399 he sibjugated the Ujjainias of Bhojpur and Tirhut. Although the Jaunpur army defeated and killed the Ujjainia chief, Har Raj, his death did not crush the rebellion. Instead, Har Raj’s sons, Gaj Raj and Dev Raj, retreated into the hills. From this stronghold, they launched a persistent guerrilla campaign, continually harassing the local authorities appointed by Jaunpur.

=== Under Ibrahim Shah ===
When Ibrahim Shah took power, he launched a new campaign to suppress the Ujjainiya Rajputs of Bhojpur. Following their initial defeat by Malik Sarwar, the Ujjainiyas had been forced to retreat into the hills. However, as soon as Sarwar died in 1399, they seized the opportunity and establish a new stronghold at Karur. In response, Ibrahim Shah dispatched an army to crush them at Karur. The Ujjainiya chief, Jagdeo, was forced to flee into the forests, where he eventually died. His successor, Sangram Deo, continued the rebellion by launching guerrilla warfare campaign against Jaunpur’s local administrators which persisted until Ibrahim Shah’s death in 1440.

=== Under Mahmud Shah ===
Following the death of Ibrahim Sharqi in 1440, the Ujjainiya chief Sangram Deo seized the opportunity to descend from the hills and reoccupy Bhojpur. He established his new seat of power at Dawa, located between modern-day Bikrampur and Dumraon, present day Bhojpur district. When Sangram Deo died in 1453–54, his pleasure-loving son, Ishwari Singh, succeeded him. Ishwari Singh's neglect of governance quickly plunged the autonomous fiefdom into chaos. Sensing an opportunity, Sultan Mahmud Shah of Jaunpur dispatched an army to conquer the Ujjainiya stronghold. Ishwari Singh fled into the forests, the Sharqi forces eventually captured and killed him, occupying the capital of Dawa and placing a governor in charge. The Ujjainiyas refused to surrender and continued guerrilla campaign against Jaunpur soldiers until Mahmud Shah’s death in 1457.

== Aftermath ==
By the latter half of the 1400s, many Ujjaniyas were paying tribute to the Jaunpur Sultan as the Ujjainiya chief at the time, Durlabh Deva had accepted their suzerainty. This continued until the Jaunpur Sultanate was eventually absorbed into the Lodi dynasty.

== See also ==
- Bengal-Jaunpur confrontation
- Sharqi invasions of Orissa
- Lodi–Sharqi War

== Bibliography ==
- Hussain, Ejaz (2017-01-01). Shiraz-i Hind: A History of Jaunpur Sultanate.
