= Battle of Narela (1452) =

Battle part of the Lodi–Sharqi War

- Part of Lodi–Sharqi War
Date	1452
Location	Narela, Delhi Sultanate
Result	Lodi victory
Territorial changes	Status quo ante bellum

Belligerents
Jaunpur Sultanate	Delhi Sultanate

Commanders and leaders
Mahmud Shah; Fath Khan Harawi †; Darya Khan Lodi	Bahlul Khan Lodi; Qutb Khan Lodi; Rai Karan

Strength
30,000 cavalry 1,400 elephants	Unknown

Casualties and losses
7 elephants captured	Unknown

The Battle of Narela (1452) was a decisive battle fought during the Lodi–Sharqi War near Narela, north of Delhi. The Jaunpur army under Fath Khan Harawi and Darya Khan Lodi was sent to defeat Sultan Bahlul Lodi. The two armies, clashed with the approaching Lodi forces. Despite being outnumbered, Bahlul Lodi's army achieved a major victory. The defection of Darya Khan Lodi, who switched sides after an appeal to Afghan tribal loyalty, proved decisive. The Sharqi commander Fath Khan Harawi was captured and executed. The rout at Narela forced Sultan Mahmud Sharqi to abandon the siege of Delhi and retreat to Jaunpur.

== Background ==
In 1452, taking advantage of Bahlul Khan Lodi's absence from Delhi, Sultan Mahmud Shah of Jaunpur invaded with a massive army of 170,000 soldiers and 1,400 war elephants. He laid siege on Delhi. Bahlul, who was at Dipalpur when he received the news, immediately rushed towards Delhi with his forces. Delhi's small garrison cunningly defended the fort. As the Sharqi army began to overwhelm the garrison through sheer numbers, the defenders decided to negotiate surrender. Sayyid Shamsuddin was sent with the keys of the fort to Darya Khan Lodi, a Lodi Afghan serving under Mahmud Sharqi. In a private meeting, Shamsuddin appealed to Darya Khan's tribal loyalty and persuaded him not to dishonour fellow Lodi women sheltered inside the fort. Darya Khan, moved by the appeal, returned the keys and cleverly convinced Mahmud Sharqi to reject the surrender. He argued that instead of capturing the fort immediately, the Sharqi army should shift its focus to defeat Bahlul Lodi, who was rapidly approaching Delhi. Once Bahlul was crushed, he claimed, Delhi would fall easily. Mahmud accepted the advice and dispatched a large part of his forces to confront Bahlul.

== Battle ==
At the suggestion of Darya Khan Lodi, Sultan Mahmud dispatched a large force of 30,000 cavalry and 30 elephants under Fath Khan Harawi and Darya Khan Lodi to intercept Bahlul Lodi and prevent him from relieving Delhi. The two armies clashed at Narela, about 17 miles north of Delhi. Bahlul had significantly smaller army of 14,000 troops. He appealed to Afghan chiefs for support, and many had joined him. The battle began when Lodi troops seized Sharqi camels and bullocks grazing nearby, forcing the engagement. During the fierce fighting, Qutb Khan Lodi, shot and disabled Fath Khan Harawi's war elephant, causing disorder in the Sharqi ranks. Qutb Khan then persuaded Darya Khan Lodi's utilizing tribal loyalty with the same emotional argument used earlier in Delhi:

"Your mothers and sisters are trapped in the fort of Delhi. Does it befit you to fight for a stranger and ignore the honour of your own Afghan women?"

Darya Khan, already inclined to defect, withdrew his forces from the battlefield on the condition that he would not be pursued. His sudden betrayal caused panic and confusion in the Sharqi army. Left unsupported, Fath Khan Harawi fought on but was ultimately defeated and captured. He was then beheaded by Rai Karan of Shamsabad, whose brother Rai Pithora had earlier been killed by Fath Khan. His severed head was presented to Bahlul Lodi. The decisive victory at Narela shattered the Sharqi expedition. The defeated remnants of the Sharqi army retreated in disarray back to Mahmud Sharqi's camp outside Delhi.

== Aftermath ==
After their defeat at Narela, the shattered Sharqi forces retreated to Sultan Mahmud Sharqi's camp outside Delhi. The arrival of the defeated troops spread panic and confusion in the Jaunpur army. Already disheartened by the death of Fath Khan Harawi, Mahmud Sharqi lost his morale. He decided to abandon the siege and retreated with his army back to Jaunpur.

== See also ==
- Battle of Khanwa
- Bengal–Jaunpur confrontation

== Bibliography ==
- Saeed, Mian Muhammad (1972). The Sharqi Sultanate of Jaunpur: A Political & Cultural History. University of Karachi.
- Pandey, Awadh Bihari (1956). The First Afghan Empire in India, 1451-1526 A. D. Bookland. Archived from the original on 2018-09-25.
- Halim, Abdul (1961). History of the Lodi Sultans of Delhi and Agra. University of Dacca. Archived from the original on 2017-01-16.
- Roy, Nirodbhusan (1958). Niamatullah's History of the Afghans: Part 1 - Lodi Period. Santiniketan Press.
- Habib, Mohammad; Nizami, Khaliq Ahmad (1970). A Comprehensive History of India. Vol. 5, Part 2. People's Publishing House.
- Haig, W. (1928). The Cambridge History of India: Turks and Afghans, edited by W. Haig. Vol. III. Cambridge University Press.
- Lal, Kishori Saran (1963). Twilight of the Sultanate. Asia Publishing House. OCLC 500687579.
- Hussain, Syed Ejaz (2025-10-27). Shiraz-I Hind: A History of Jaunpur Sultanate. BRILL. ISBN 978-90-04-75387-7.
- Halim, Abdul (1939). "Sikandar Lodi as a Founder". Proceedings of the Indian History Congress. 3: 842–848. ISSN 2249-1937.
