= Lodi–Sharqi War =

War between the Jaunpur Sultanate and the Delhi Sultanate

Date	1451–1500
Location	Uttar Pradesh, Madhya Pradesh, Bihar
Result	Lodi victory: Fall of Jaunpur Sultanate
Territorial changes	Territories of Jaunpur Sultanate annexed to Delhi Sultanate

Belligerents
Delhi Sultanate	Jaunpur Sultanate; Supported by: Bengal Sultanate

Commanders and leaders
Bahlul Khan Lodi; Sikandar Khan Lodi; Darya Khan Lodi; Sayyad Shamsuddin; Shah Sikandar Sarwani; Qutb Khan Lodi # Rai Pratap; Bibi Matto; Rai Karan; Jalal Khan; Ahmad Khan Mewati; Rustam Khan; Khan Jahan Lodi; Rai Dandu; Tilok Chand; Mubarak Khan Nuhani (POW); Barbak Shah; Daulat Khan; Sher Shah †; Umar Khan Sherwani; A'zam Humayun	Mahmud Shah; Muhammad Shah; Husain Shah; Darya Khan Lodi; Fath Khan Harawi †; Jalal Khan (POW); Juna Khan; Bibi Raji; Ahmad Khan Mewati; Ahmad Khan Jalwani; Rustam Khan; Malik Shams †; Qutb Khan Lodi; Qazi Sama-ud Din (POW); Budha (POW); Ibrahim Khan; Haibat Khan Gurgandaz; Malik Kakar; Tilok Chand; Iqbal Khan; Juga; Rai Bhed; Mir Sayyid Khan (POW); Nar Singh Deo (DOW)

Strength
1469: 18,000 cavalry 1484: 20,000 cavalry 1500: 9,000 cavalry	1542: Delhi: 170,000 cavalry and infantry 1,400 elephants; Narela: 30,000 cavalry 1,400 elephants; 1469: 1,40,000 cavalry 1,400 elephants 1471: 100,000 cavalry 1,000 elephants 1484: 30,000 cavalry 1490: 200,000 infantry 15,000 cavalry

Casualties and losses
Unknown; heavy	1452: 7 elephants captured 1484: 30 elephants

The Lodi–Sharqi War (Note: Persian: جنگ لودی-شرقی Pashto: د لودي-شرقي جګړه Awadhi: लोदी-शर्की युद्ध) (1452–1500) were a series of prolonged conflicts between the Lodi dynasty of Delhi and the Sharqi dynasty of Jaunpur in northern India. The wars originated from the power vacuum following the decline of the Sayyid dynasty. Bahlul Lodi, who seized the Delhi throne in 1451, sought to expand his authority over the fragmented territories of the former Delhi Sultanate. The Sharqi rulers, particularly Mahmud Shah Sharqi (r. 1440–1457) and later Husain Shah (r. 1458–1494), aimed to capture Delhi and restore Jaunpur's rule in the region. The conflicts evolved through multiple phases throughout the mid-fifteenth century.

Early clashes from 1452 to 1479 witnessed repeated Sharqi attempts to conquer Delhi. Major battles such as Delhi (1452), Narela (1452), Etawah (1455), Shamsabad (1456), Chandwar (1469), the Yamuna (1469), and Kachh (1479). Despite several near-victories, Husain Sharqi was repeatedly defeated due to Lodi tactical brilliance and internal Sharqi weaknesses. By 1484, Bahlul Lodi captured the Sharqi capital Jaunpur, annexing western part. Under Sikandar Lodi (r. 1489–1517), the wars continued as Husain Shah, operating from Bihar and Chunar, incited zamindar rebellions and launched further campaigns. Key later engagements included the Battle of Chaund (1492), battles at Chunar and Bhata (1493–94). Following the Battle of Benares (1494), Husain Shah fled to his ally Bengal Sultanate territory, leaving the eastern part of his kingdom under Lodi occupation. The wars effectively ended in 1500 with Husain Shah's failed capture of Bihar. He retreated to Colgong, where he lived until his death in 1505. The conflicts resulted in the complete annihilation of the Sharqi kingdom, the expansion of Lodis to Jaunpur and Bihar.

== Background ==
After Muhammad Shah's death, his son Alauddin Alam Shah (r. 1445–1451) became ruler of the Sayyid dynasty. He inherited only a small territory consisting of Delhi, Badaun, Palam and few parganas. The rest of the areas were held by powerful chiefs. The tract from Mehrauli to Lado Sarai was under Ahmad Khan Mewati. Darya Khan Lodi held Sambhal district up to the fort of Khwaja Khizr near Delhi. Isa Khan possessed Koil (Aligarh) and Jalali. (Note: Jalali is situated in Aligarh) Qutb Khan, controlled Rapri. (Note: Village in Shikohabad, Mainpuri district) Rai Pratap, retained independent ownership of Patiali in Aliganj, Bhongaon. Daud Khan Auhadi held Kampil and Bayana. Meanwhile, Bahlul Lodi occupied Sirhind, Lahore, Sunam, and Hisar Firuza up to Panipat. Bahlul Khan Lodi controlled Punjab up to Panipat. In 1447, Bahlul Lodi attacked Delhi. Alam Shah, proved to be a weak ruler of the Sayyid dynasty of the Delhi Sultanate. Although he held nominal authority while real power rested with his wazir, Hamid Khan. His brother-in-law, Mahmud Shah of Jaunpur was now very eager to claim Delhi. In 1448, Alam Shah permanently moved to Badaun. He left management of Delhi to his two brothers-in-law. Enmity between the two brothers spoiled affairs of the capital. Finally, one killed the other. Then people of the city killed the remaining one on instigation of Hisam Khan, former wazir. Alam Shah was informed by opponents of Hamid Khan that all this was conspiracy of Hamid Khan. He ordered to arrest and execution of Hamid Khan. But Hamid Khan escaped from prison and ran to Delhi. There Hisam Khan joined him. Hamid Khan entered the harem of the Sultan, driving out the Sultan's wife, sons and daughters bareheaded from the citadel. Then he took the treasures and declared sovereignty. Alam Shah could not return to Delhi due to heavy rains. This gave courage to Hamid Khan. He planned to put another person on the throne. Alam Shah called Bahlul Lodi from Sirhind. Bahlul proceeding to Delhi with a large army, negotiated with Hamid Khan and took keys of the citadel in 1451. Later he arrested Hamid Khan and took the sovereignty himself. Mahmud Sharqi's wife being alarmed hearing this, persuaded her husband to attack Bahlul. Bahlul Lodi pretended to apologize humbly and offered a warm welcome, but Sultan Mahmud Sharqi saw through the deception and refused. Meanwhile, some dissatisfied amirs of Alam Shah defected to Mahmud's court during Bahlul's absence in Punjab and invited him to Delhi. Already having assembled a large army, Mahmud became decided to seize Delhi's throne.

== Early conflicts (1452) ==
=== Siege of Delhi ===
In 1452 AD, Mahmud Shah invaded Delhi. Bahlul Lodi tried to avoid war by sending humble messages and showing submissiveness. However, Mahmud ignored these overtures. Taking advantage of Bahlul's absence from Delhi, Mahmud marched with a massive army consisting of 170,000 cavalry and infantry along with 1,400 war elephants and laid siege to the capital. As soon as Bahlul received news of the invasion, he immediately turned back from Dipalpur. The garrison at Delhi decided to wait until Bahlul arrived with a relieving force. Bahlul's son Khwaja Bayazid and mother-in-law Bibi Matto and other nobles shut themselves inside the fort to defend it. To make the defenders appear stronger than they actually were, Bibi Matto cleverly dressed up the women as men and posted them as guards along the walls. Meanwhile, Shah Sikandar Sarwani tried to halt Sharqi assault. Mahmud Shah overwhelmed the garrison. Left with no choice, Bayazid Khan and Sarwani approached to negotiate terms of surrender. They sent Sayyid Shamsuddin with the keys of the fort to Darya Khan Lodi, one of Sultan Mahmud Sharqi's senior commanders who was a Lodi Afghan. Before handing over the keys, Sayyid Shamsuddin requested a private meeting and cleverly persuaded Darya Khan. Deeply moved by these words and Darya Khan immediately returned the keys without accepting them. He then went back to Mahmud Sharqi and convinced the Sultan that Bahlul was rapidly approaching Delhi with a large army. Instead of taking the fort immediately, it would be better to keep the garrison trapped inside while the main Sharqi forces moved to intercept and crush Bahlul's army. Once Bahlul was defeated, Delhi would fall automatically. Mahmud Sharqi, though somewhat doubtful, accepted Darya Khan's advice. Thus, the clever stratagem succeeded. The pressure on the fort was temporarily eased, and the defenders gained precious time while the Mahmud Shah dispatched a force towards Bahlul's approaching forces. The two armies met at Narela and a decisive battle followed.

=== Battle of Narela ===
At the suggestion of Darya Khan Lodi, Sultan Mahmud dispatched a large force of 30,000 cavalry and 30 elephants under Fath Khan Harawi and Darya Khan Lodi to intercept Bahlul Lodi and prevent him from relieving Delhi. The two armies clashed at Narela, about 17 miles north of Delhi. Bahlul had significantly smaller army of 14,000 troops. He appealed to Afghan chiefs for support, and many had joined him. The battle began when Lodi troops seized Sharqi camels and bullocks grazing nearby, forcing the engagement. During the fierce fighting, Qutb Khan Lodi, shot and disabled Fath Khan Harawi's war elephant, causing disorder in the Sharqi ranks. Qutb Khan then persuaded Darya Khan Lodi utilizing tribal loyalty with the same emotional argument used earlier in Delhi. Darya Khan, already inclined to defect, withdrew his forces from the battlefield on the condition that he would not be pursued. His sudden betrayal caused panic and confusion in the Sharqi army. Left unsupported, Fath Khan Harawi fought on but was ultimately defeated and captured. He was then beheaded by Rai Karan of Shamsabad, whose brother Rai Pithora had earlier been killed by Fath Khan. His severed head was presented to Bahlul Lodi. The decisive victory at Narela shattered the Sharqi expedition.

The defeated Sharqi forces now fell back and returned to Sultan Mahmud Sharqi's camp, which was still besieging Delhi. The arrival of the broken and defeated troops spread confusion and panic in the Sharqi ranks. When Bibi Matto learned of this, she immediately ordered the drums of victory to be beaten from the fort. This unexpected sound confused Sultan Mahmud, who was already disheartened by his army's rout at Narela. Mahmud abandoned the siege and retreated to Jaunpur.

== Lodi–Sharqi War (1455–1457) ==
=== Battle of Etawah (1455) ===
By 1455, Bahlol Lodi consolidated his power in the neighbouring jagirs. His submission and expulsion of Etawah's governor, a Sharqi vassal, renewed conflict with Jaunpur. On hearing of Bahlul's annexation of Etawah, Sultan Mahmud marched against him. After an indecisive battle near Etawah, peace was mediated by Qutb Khan Lodi and Rai Pratap. The terms agreed were: territories held by Sultan Mubarak Shah of Delhi would go to Bahlul, while those held by Sultan Ibrahim of Jaunpur would remain with Mahmud Sharqi; Bahlul would return the seven elephants captured at the Battle of Narela (1452); and Shamsabad which was held by Juna Khan, would be transferred to Bahlul after the rains. Both monarchs then returned to their capitals.

=== Battle of Shamsabad (1456) ===
Bahlul Lodi asked Juna Khan to hand over Shamsabad to his nominee, Rai Karan, as per the treaty. When Juna Khan refused, Bahlul marched on Shamsabad in 1456. He expelled Juna Khan, and installed Rai Karan. Juna Khan sought help from the Jaunpur court. Sultan Mahmud, regretting the earlier agreement, broke the treaty and attacked Bahlul's forces in Shamsabad. Qutb Khan and Darya Khan Lodi launched a night attack on the Sharqi army, but Qutb Khan was captured. He was sent to Jaunpur and remained in captivity for seven months. Bahlul left Prince Jalal Khan and Prince Sikandar to assist Rai Karan in defending Shamsabad and himself marched against Sultan Mahmud. At this point, Sultan Mahmud suddenly fell ill and died in 1457. Bibi Raji, Mahmud's widow, placed her son Prince Bhikhan Khan on the throne with the support of the nobles. The new ruler assumed the title of Muhammad Shah. The war was soon ended through mediation by nobles of both sides. A fresh treaty was concluded, under which territories held by the late Sultan Mahmud remained with Muhammad Shah, while those belonging to Sultan Alauddin Alam Shah stayed with Bahlul. Both kings then returned to their respective capitals.

=== Battle of Sirsuti (1457) ===
When Bahlul was returning to Delhi, his wife Shams Khatun dispatched a message urging him to save her brother, Qutb Khan in captivity. Bahlul marched to Jaunpur. Muhammad Shah also marched to oppose him. Reaching Shamsabad, he expelled its governor Rai Karan and appointed Juna Khan. He then encamped at Sirsuti to oppose Bahlul. The Delhi forces reached Rapri near Sirsuti, encamping there. The two armies exchanged skirmish for several days without a decisive result.

Sultan Muhammad finding his nobles disloyal, decided to crush all rivals of the throne. He ordered the execution of his brothers, Hasan Khan and Qutb Khan Lodi who were imprisoned. Hasan Khan was executed in the absence of their mother. Enraged by her son's treachery, Bibi Raji secretly contacted Princes Husain Khan and Jalal Khan, who were at the camp to defect. She encamped near Kannauj. Husain Khan deserted Muhammad Shah and proceeded to Jaunpur. Jalal Khan fell into the hand of Bahlul while returning and was captured. He was kept as a hostage for Qutb Khan Lodi. On reaching Kannauj, prince Husain and Sharqi nobles joined Bibi Raji who declared Husain as king. Weakened by desertions, Muhammad Shah fled but was pursued and later killed in battle at Rajgir ford by Jaunpur army under Bibi Raji and Husain Shah. Husain Shah made a truce with Bahlul on the status quo for three years and exchanged Qutb Khan and Jalal Khan as prisoners. Sharqis retained Shamsabad reinstalling Juna Khan. Rai Pratap who previously joined the Sharqis now turned back to Bahlul.

== Lodi–Sharqi War (1468–1471) ==
=== Battle of Chandwar (1469) ===
In 1461, before the end of the period Bahlul expelled Juna Khan from Shamsabad, installing Rai Karan. The four-year truce between the Delhi and Jaunpur in 1458 came to an end in 1462. Hussain Shah reorganized to attack Delhi. In the meantime, Rai Pratap, Qutb Khan and Mubariz Khan had hostilities with Bahlul and defected to Husain Shah. In 1468, long after the four-year truce ended, Husain Shah marched with a large army towards Delhi. Upon hearing this, Bahlol Lodi rushed to Delhi. On the way, some of Bahlul's nobles, including Ahmad Khan Mewati and Rustam Khan, governor of Koil defected to Hussain Shah. In 1469, the two sultans clashed at Chandwar near Agra in a fierce battle. After a week of heavy fighting, both sides, exhausted, agreed to another three-year truce. They decided to maintain their previous boundaries and returned to their respective capitals.

=== Invasions of Delhi (1469–1470) ===
Sultan Husain Sharqi, not content with the existing truce, set his ambition on capturing Delhi from Bahlul Lodi. He actively worked to win over nobles and allies. He assembled a large force with numerous horses, elephants, and artillery. Key allies he secured included the governor of Etawah, Ahmad Khan Mewati, Rustam Khan, governor of Kol and Ahmad Khan Jalwani, the governor of Bayana. Bahlul Lodi attempted to suppress Ahmad Khan Mewati by invading Mewat, but failed. Ahmad Khan Mewati was later persuaded by Husain's noble Khan Jahan to join the Sharqi side. His chief noble Malik Shams advised a cautious strategy of border raids in the first year followed by a full invasion the next. However, Queen Bibi Khunza pushed for immediate action to reclaim her father Alam Shah's throne. Husain ignored the advice and marched on Delhi in early 1469 with a massive army of 1,40,000 cavalry and 1,400 elephants, breaking the three-year truce.

==== Battle of the Yamuna (1469) ====
Meanwhile, Sultan Husain Sharqi advanced with his large army and rapidly captured a significant portion of the Delhi Sultanate's territory, including Bulandshahr and Koil, modern Aligarh. Bahlul Lodi, finding his position increasingly weak, offered generous peace terms to avoid further conflict. He proposed that Husain Sharqi would receive the entire territory of Delhi except the capital city itself and its suburbs within a radius of 36 miles. In addition, Bahlul offered to accept the position of a vassal and feudatory of the Sharqi monarch. However, overconfident Husain Shah rejected these terms. With no other option, Bahlul came out from Delhi to engage the Sharqi army. The Sharqi nobles were sent out to plunder the countryside; they ventured farther and farther from their base as they faced little resistance. Taking advantage of this situation, Bahlul crossed the Yamuna River with 18,000 Afghan soldiers and launched a surprise attack on the Sharqi camp in broad daylight. Caught completely off guard while many were holidaying and unprepared, the Sharqi forces panicked. Husain Sharqi fled the battlefield to save his life, abandoning his chief queen, Bibi Khunza, and other members of the harem, who were taken captive. In this decisive engagement, Husain's chief noble and counsellor, Malik Shams, was killed. In 1470, Bahlul Lodi later released the queen and captives with full honour.

==== Battle of Bhatwar (1471) ====
Despite his earlier defeat, Sultan Husain Sharqi marched again on Delhi in 1471, again encouraged by his chief queen Bibi Khunza. He led a large army of 100,000 cavalry and 1,000 elephants. Sultan Bahlul Lodi came out to confront him, and both armies faced each other at Bhatwar, near Bulandshahr. Bahlul offered peace, but Husain rejected it. After minor skirmishes, peace was eventually arranged through the mediation of Khan Jahan Lodi. Bahlul returned to Delhi, while Husain withdrew to Etawah.

== Lodi–Sharqi War (1473–1479) ==
After a gap of two years, in 1473, Husain Shah launched another invasion of Delhi with a strong force. Bahlul Lodi marched out to confront him, and the two armies met at Sikhera. Fighting continued till the rainy season forcing both sides to make peace and return to their territories.

The death of Sultan Alauddin at Badaun in 1478 provided the occasion for a fresh war. About a year earlier, Husain Shah's mother, Bibi Raji, had died at Etawah. Qutb Khan Lodi, sent by Delhi to offer condolences, was imprisoned by Husain but escaped by flattering him and promising help in conquering Delhi. After Alauddin's death, Husain Shah went to Badaun under the pretext of mourning his father-in-law, but quickly seized the city by expelling Alauddin's sons. By February–March 1479, he attacked Sambhal, captured its Lodi governor Mubarak Khan and imprisoned him. Sultan Husain now possessed a huge army including 1,000 elephants.

=== Battle of Kachh and Ram Mahjur ===
Husain Shah advanced to the ford of Kachh on the Ganges. Bahlul Lodi sent his son Husain Khan via Meerut to defend Delhi, while he himself rushed there. He crossed the Yamuna with his army and attacked the superior Sharqi army. Husain Shah was on the verge of defeating Bahlul Lodi and winning the battle when Qutb Khan Lodi once again used diplomacy. He sent a message to Husain, reminding him that he had been a slave of his mother Bibi Raji, who had shown him great kindness while he was imprisoned in Jaunpur. Appealing to Husain's emotions, Qutb Khan persuaded him to make peace. Under the treaty, the territory east of the Ganges remained with Husain Shah, while the west went to Bahlul Lodi. After the agreement, Husain arranged a grand night party of music and dance. On Qutb Khan's suggestion, the party was shifted to the bank of the Yamuna, where Bahlul's forces launched a surprise attack. Husain's impending victory turned into a rout. Bahlul's army captured his entire baggage, stores, camp equipment, elephants, horses, and treasures. Total 40 nobles and officers were taken prisoner, including the Wazir Qazi Sama-ud Din and the deputy paymaster Budha. Husain Sharqi barely escaped. His chief queen, Malika-i Jahan Bibi Khunza, was again captured but was treated with respect and later released by Bahlul, who sent her back to Etawah with honour. Bahlul emerged victorious and captured several parganas of Kampil, Patiali, Koil, Shamsabad, Mahrara, and Jalali which had been under Sharqi control. He strengthened the garrisons there and continued pursuing Husain Sharqi. Shortly after, Husain Shah regrouped his forces and launched another attack on the Lodis in early 1479 at the village of Ram Mahjur in Rapri pargana. The attack dealt a heavy blow to the Lodi forces. Eventually, both monarchs agreed to make peace and decided to abide their previous boundaries.

== Fall of Jaunpur (1480–1484) ==
Despite the earlier treaty, Husain Shah remained dissatisfied and eager to capture Delhi. Deeply hurt by Bahlul Lodi's treachery, he renewed the war in 885 AH corresponding to the year 1480–81, again instigated by his wife Bibi Khunza. The two armies clashed at Sonhar in Etah district, where Husain suffered a heavy defeat. Bahlul plundered his camp. Bahlul stayed at Dhopamau and Husain at Rapri. Further battles followed at Sirsa near Rapri in 1482, resulting in another decisive defeat for Husain. While fleeing across the Yamuna, some of his family members, including his son, drowned, causing him great grief. Husain then went to Gwalior and received financial and military support from Raja Kirat Singh. Meanwhile, Bahlul marched against Etawah to capture it. Husain's brother, Ibrahim Khan and his officers, Haibat Khan Gurgandaz and Malik Kakar, fought for three days before capitulation. Bahlul placed Etawah in charge of Ibrahim Khan Nuhani and some parganas were detached from it and given to Rai Dandu. Later, at Rangaon/Raigaon (near Kanpur), the armies faced each other across the Ganges for several months. Raja Tilok Chand the governor of Baksar betrayed Husain by guiding Bahlul's forces to attack from the rear, forcing Husain to flee to Bhata (Rewa). From there, he returned to Jaunpur with help from Raja Bhedchandra. Bahlul pursued him relentlessly. Husain raised a fresh army at Kannauj, but was defeated again in 1482 on the banks of the Kali Nadi (Ab-i Siyah) near Kannauj. He lost heavily, including his regalia, and Bibi Khunza was briefly captured once more before being released. Bahlul then occupied Jaunpur's dependencies and captured Jaunpur itself in 1483, appointing Mubarak Khan Nuhani as governor but left an outpost in the township of Mijhauli with Qutb Khan Lodi and Khan Jahan Lodi. When Husain heard the news, he rushed from Qannauj to Jaunpur with his army. While Bahlul was away, Husain Shah attacked Jaunpur and forced his officers to flee to Mijhauli. Qutb Khan son of Jahan Khan Lodi opened negotiations to buy time for reinforcements. Bahlul sent his son Barbak Shah ahead to Jaunpur and followed with the main army. In 1484, Husain Shah fled to Bihar without fighting. Bahlul chased Husain as far as Haldi, a village in the Ballia district of Uttar Pradesh. There Bahlul heard the death of his wazir, Qutb Khan Lodi and returned to Delhi. He returned to Jaunpur continuing his campaign. Husain Sharqi was allowed to hold a small area of land around Chunar as his family estate, the income of which was five lakh tankas annually. Barbak Shah was now declared as Lodi deputy at Jaunpur. Bahlul fortified Jaunpur to avoid future troubles. He then reduced the remaining Sharqi territories. From Jaunpur, he conquered Kalpi and granted it to his grandson Prince A'zam Humayun. Proceeding via Chandwar to Dholpur, the Raja of Dholpur who a Sharqi vassal submitted. From there, he went to Bari, where the governor Iqbal Khan submitted and was confirmed in his post.

=== Husain Shah's invasion of Jaunpur ===
Shortly after the events Bahlul was busy occupying neighbouring territories, Husain Shah attacked Barbak Shah and captured Jaunpur, as Barbak could not withstand the assault and surrendered the city. When Bahlul received this news on his way to the capital, he immediately turned back with a large force to reinstate his son. Husain Shah sent his nephew Jalal Khan with 30,000 cavalry to oppose Bahlul near Kalpi and followed in person. On reaching Kalpi, Bahlul found the road to Jaunpur blocked. Despite opposition, he crossed the Ganges and divided his army into two divisions. One division of 15,000 cavalry under Ahmad Khan and Qutb Khan was placed in ambush, while the other division of 5,000 cavalry under Daulat Khan was ordered to face the Sharqi forces and retreat orderly to lure the Sharqi army into the trap. Bahlul's soldiers then closed the roads from both sides and launched a massive attack on the Sharqis. A large number of Husain's soldiers were massacred. Thirty elephants, many horses, and a large amount of booty fell into Bahlul's hands. Husain had no choice but to flee to Bihar. Bahlul then reached Jaunpur, reinstated Barbak Shah on the throne, and returned to Delhi where he died in July 1489.

== Later conflicts (1489–1500) ==
After Bahlol Lodi's death, his son Nizam Khan ascended the throne as Sikandar Shah on 16 July 1489. His brothers, Alam Khan and Barbak Shah, challenged his succession. Encouraged by Husain Shah, he marched with his army towards Delhi to seize the throne. Husain Shah continued efforts to recover Jaunpur by secretly inciting rebellions among loyal zamindars and chieftains instead of open war. By 1489–1490, he was able to gather large influence. The most serious uprising was led by Juga, a powerful Bachgoti Rajput zamindar. Juga assembled a huge army of 200,000 infantry and 15,000 cavalry. He attacked and killed Sikandar Lodi's governor Sher Khan at Kara, seized the fort, and captured his brother Mubarak Khan Nuhani. He was imprisoned by Rai Bhed, the ruler of Bhata (Rewa). Juga then advanced on Jaunpur, forcing Barbak Shah to flee to Daryabad. In 1491, Sultan Sikandar Lodi marched with a large force to Jaunpur. He faced strong resistance from Husain-loyal zamindars at Katgarh (Dalmau) but overcame it, reinstated Barbak in Jaunpur, and suppressed the rebellion. The war between Sikandar Lodi and Husain Shah ultimately centred on the punishment of Juga.

=== Battle of Chaund (1492) ===
With his enormous army, Juga had become a major threat to Lodi authority. Sikandar vowed to eliminate him and marched with his forces to capture Juga. Upon learning of the approaching army, Juga fled to Husain Shah, who was waiting in the fort of Jaund (Chaund) near Bhabhua in Bihar. Sikandar encamped near the fort and demanded that Husain either punish Juga or hand him over. Husain, however, sent back an insulting reply to the Lodi Sultan though his noble Mir Sayyid Khan. When peace efforts failed, Sikandar Lodi advanced with his army towards the fort of Jaund (Chaund). Umar Khan Sherwani was made the commander-in-chief of the army. Husain Shah came out of the fort with his forces, and the two armies clashed in a fierce battle in 1492. The battle took place near Chaund at Bhabhua in present-day Bihar. The strong forts of Chunar and Chaund, were still under Husain Sharqi's control, while the western regions were held by the Lodis. Husain Sharqi was defeated and fled to South Bihar. Many of his nobles, officials, and soldiers were captured. Sikandar Lodi treated the prisoners with respect including Mir Sayyid Khan. Bahlul left to Delhi after leaving Barbak at Jaunpur.

=== Battles with Bachgoti zamindars ===
Husain Shah once again strengthened his position and gained control over Chunar, Cherand, and a large part of Bihar. Sikandar Lodi resolved to crush his power. In 1493, Sikandar first despatched Mubarak Khan with an army to capture Chunar. Husain, informed by his faujdar Khwaja, sent Raja Bhed with a strong force to relieve the fort. A fierce battle ensued in which the Lodi army was routed. Mubarak Khan was wounded, captured, and taken prisoner. In early 1494, Sikandar Lodi marched personally, besieged the strong fort of Chunar, but failed to capture it. He then proceeded to Bhata to punish Raja Bhed. Fearing the Sultan's wrath, Raja Bhed released Mubarak Khan and fled to join Husain Shah. Enraged, Sikandar devastated the cultivation and orchards of Arail (Note: Village opposite the Allahabad Fort) and Prayag, destroyed villages from Dalmau to Koil, and returned to Delhi. By mid-1494, Sikandar launched another campaign against Husain and his allies. He attacked Raja Bhed of Bhata, destroying villages of smaller zamindars who supported the Sharqis. Raja Bhed, along with his son Nar Singh Deo, gathered a large force and confronted the Lodi army at Karan Khati but was defeated. Both fled; Nar Singh Deo succumbed to his wounds on the way. Sikandar could not continue his campaign due to famine and destruction of his resources, returning to Jaunpur.

=== Battle of Benares ===
Husain Shah again assembled his forces and Rajput zamindar allies and marched from Bihar against him. Sikandar tried to win over some local Rajput chieftains, including Salivahan, the brother of Raja Bhed. He crossed the Ganges, passed through Chunar, and reached near Benares. The two armies clashed about 36 miles from Benares at the end of 1494. Husain was defeated again and fled first to Bhata and then to Bihar. Sikandar pursued him for nine days but halted when Husain took shelter in Colgong (Kahalgaon) which was part of the Bengal Sultanate. Sultan Alauddin Husain Shah (r. 1493–1519), whose daughter was married to Husain's son Jalal Khan, warmly welcomed him, granted the pargana of Colgong, allowed him to mint coins, and promised military help to recover his lost kingdom.

== Aftermath ==
=== Lodi conquest of Bihar ===
Sikandar Lodi camped at Deobar in Champaran where he defeated Malik Kandu who fled Bihar. The citadel was taken and thus Bihar was finally annexed to the Delhi Sultanate in 1495. Mubarak Khan Nuhani was appointed as the governor of Bihar. Husain Shah's rule in Bihar lasted for roughly 11 years from 1483 to 1494 AD.

=== Conflict with Bengal Sultanate ===
Sikandar Lodi now planned campaign against Alauddin Husain Shah of Bengal, who had given shelter to Husain Sharqi. First he marched to Tirhut and forced its Raja who was an old ally of the Sharqis to submit. Sikandar Lodi returned to his camp at Darweshpur and began preparations to invade Bengal. In 1496, Sultan Husain Shah of Bengal despatched a large army under his son Prince Daniyal to stop the Delhi forces. Sikandar sent Mahmud Khan Lodi and Mubarak Khan Nuhani to confront them. The two armies faced each other at Barh near Patna for a while. Due to severe shortages of food in the Delhi camp, no battle took place. Eventually, a non-aggression treaty was signed, in which both sides agreed not to interfere in each other's territories or shelter each other's enemies. After the treaty, Sikandar appointed A'zam Humayun as governor of Darweshpur and Darya Khan Nuhani in South Bihar. He then proceeded to Jaunpur, where he stayed for six months in 1497. There he ordered the destruction of all Sharqi edifices including palaces, gardens, forts. Only mosques were spared at Ulama and Sufis of Jaunpur's request.

=== Husain's last attempt to recover Jaunpur ===
In 1500, Sultan Husain Sharqi made a final desperate bid to regain his lost kingdom. He marched with his Sharqi forces and besieged the fort of Bihar, held by Darya Khan, the Lodi governor. Darya Khan shut himself inside the fort and urgently sought help from Sultan Sikandar Lodi. Sikandar promptly ordered neighbouring Lodi nobles, including A'zam Humayun, to send reinforcements. A strong Lodi force of 9,000 horsemen arrived to support Darya Khan. Despite fierce resistance from the Lodis using gunpowder and arrows, and Husain's men successfully draining the deep moat in one night. The Sharqi Sultan could not capture the fort. Facing superior opposition, Husain Sharqi withdrew and retired to Colgong. This was his last attempt to recover Jaunpur. He lived the rest of his life in obscurity and died in 1505.

== List of conflicts ==
Conflicts	Time	Location	Belligerent		Result
Conflicts	Time	Location	Delhi Sultanate (Lodi)	Jaunpur Sultanate (Sharqi)	Result
Siege of Delhi (1452)	1452	Delhi	Sayyad Shamsuddin; Shah Sikandar Sarwani; Bibi Matto	Mahmud Shah; Darya Khan Lodi	Lodi victory
Battle of Narela (1452)	1452	Narela	Bahlul Khan Lodi; Qutb Khan Lodi; Rai Karan	Mahmud Shah; Fath Khan Harawi †; Darya Khan Lodi	Lodi victory
Battle of Etawah	1455	Etawah	Bahlul Lodi; Qutb Khan Lodi; Rai Pratap	Mahmud Shah	Peace treaty
Battle of Shamsabad	1456	Shamsabad	Bahlul Lodi; Qutb Khan (POW); Darya Khan Lodi; Jalal Khan; Sikandar	Mahmud Shah # Juna Khan	Peace treaty
Battle of Sirsuti	1457	Rapri	Bahlul Lodi	Mahmud Shah	Inonclusive
Capture of Shamsabad	1461	Shamsabad	Bahlul Lodi	Juna Khan	Lodi victory
Battle of Chandwar	1469	Chandwar	Bahlul Lodi	Husain Shah	Peace treaty
Battle of the Yamuna	1469	Yamuna	Bahlul Lodi	Husain Shah; Shams Khan †	Lodi victory
Battle of Bhatwar	1471	Bhatwar	Bahlul Lodi	Husain Shah	Lodi victory
Battle of Sikhera	1473	Sikhera	Bahlul Lodi	Husain Shah	Peace treaty
Battle of Kachh	1479	Kacch	Bahlul Lodi	Husain Shah; Qazi Sama-ud Din (POW); Budha (POW)	Lodi victory
Battle of Ram Mahjur	1479	Ram Mahjur	Bahlul Lodi	Husain Shah	Peace treaty
Battle of Sonhar	1480	Sonhar	Bahlul Lodi	Husain Shah	Lodi victory
Battle of Sirsa	1482	Sirsa	Bahlul Lodi	Husain Shah	Lodi victory
Siege of Etawah	1482	Etawah	Bahlul Lodi	Ibrahim Khan; Haibat Khan Gurgandaz; Malik Kakar	Lodi victory
Battle of Raigaon	1482	Raigaon	Bahlul Lodi	Husain Shah; Raja Tilok Chand	Lodi victory
Battle of the Kali Nadi	1482	Kali Nadi	Bahlul Lodi	Husain Shah	Lodi victory
Capture of Jaunpur	1483	Jaunpur	Bahlul Lodi	Unknown	Lodi victory
Capture of Dholpur	1483	Dholpur	Bahlul Lodi	Iqbal Khan	Lodi victory
Capture of Jaunpur	1483	Jaunpur	Barbak Shah	Husain Shah	Sharqi victory
Battle of the Ganges	1484	Ganges	Bahlul Lodi; Ahmad Khan; Qutb Khan; Daulat Khan	Husain Shah	Lodi victory
Battle of Chaund	1492	Chaund	Sikandar Lodi; Umar Khan Sherwani	Husain Shah; Juga; Mir Sayyid Khan (POW)	Lodi victory
Siege of Chunar	1494	Chunar	Mubarak Khan Nuhani (POW)	Raja Bhed	Sharqi victory
Battle of Karan Khati	1494	Karan Khati	Sikandar Shah	Raja Bhed; Nar Singh Deo (DOW)	Lodi victory
Battle of Benares	1494	Benares	Sikandar Shah	Husain Shah	Lodi victory
Siege of Bihar	1500	Bihar	Darya Khan; A'zam Humayun	Husain Shah	Lodi victory

== See also ==
- Lodi–Tomaras War

== Bibliography ==
- Saeed, Mian Muhammad (1972). The Sharqi Sultanate of Jaunpur: A Political & Cultural History. University of Karachi.
- Pandey, Awadh Bihari (1956). The First Afghan Empire in India, 1451-1526 A. D. Bookland. Archived from the original on 2018-09-25.
- Halim, Abdul (1961). History of the Lodi Sultans of Delhi and Agra. University of Dacca. Archived from the original on 2017-01-16.
- Roy, Nirodbhusan (1958). Niamatullah's History of the Afghans: Part 1 - Lodi Period. Santiniketan Press.
- Habib, Mohammad; Nizami, Khaliq Ahmad (1970). A Comprehensive History of India. Vol. 5, Part 2. People's Publishing House.
- Haig, W. (1928). The Cambridge History of India: Turks and Afghans, edited by W. Haig. Vol. III. Cambridge University Press.
- Lal, Kishori Saran (1963). Twilight of the Sultanate. Asia Publishing House. OCLC 500687579.
- Hussain, Syed Ejaz (2025-10-27). Shiraz-I Hind: A History of Jaunpur Sultanate. BRILL. ISBN 978-90-04-75387-7.
