= Sharqi invasions of Orissa =

Jaunpur Sultanate's invasions of Orissa

Date	c. 1444, 1458
Location	Odisha
Result	Jaunpur Sultanate victory

Belligerents
Malik Sarwar; Mahmud Shah; Husain Shah	Narsimha IV; Kapilendra Deva

Commanders and leaders
Jaunpur Sultanate	Eastern Ganga dynasty Gajapati Empire

Strength
3,00,000 cavalry 1,400 elephants (Exaggerated)	Unknown

Casualties and losses
None	None
- Kapilendra Deva pays 100 horses and 30 elephants to Jaunpur as gift

Sharqi invasions of Orissa or Jaunpur invasions of Orissa, refers to a series of military campaigns by the Jaunpur Sultanate into Orissa in the 15th centuries. The first major invasion was led by Sultan Malik Sarwar, who extracted tribute from Narasimha IV. A later campaign was undertaken by Sultan Husain Shah Sharqi in 1458 against Kapilendra Deva. Husain's forces plundered parts of Orissa, forcing Kapilendra Deva to submit and pay tribute, including 30 elephants and 100 horses. The invasions are primarily known from Persian chronicles, with some archaeological support from Sharqi coins found in Orissa.

== Background ==
After Firuz Shah Tughlaq, the rulers of Orissa and the king of Lakhnauti had stopped paying their annual tribute to Delhi. In 1393–1399 AD, Sultan Malik Sarwar, the first sultan of Jaunpur, invaded Orissa, reaching up to Jajnagar. Narasimha IV (r. 1378–1425) of the Eastern Ganga dynasty was compelled to pay tribute. Later, Mahmud Shah of Jaunpur led campaign against Orissa then ruled by Kapilendra Deva (r. 1434–1466) of the Gajapati dynasty. According to Nizam-ud Din Ahmad and Firishta, after the Chunar campaign Mahmud invaded Orissa, plundered the region, and returned with massive booty. However, there is no corroborative evidence for this. Mahmud may have only made a limited raid on the frontiers to capture elephants for which Orissa was famous. An inscription of a Jame Mosque dated 1443, states he had initiated plans to spread Islam in the region. He built two mosques at Paharpur in Bihar, assigning Muftis, before returning to his capital. Ferishta assigns the date to 848 A.H. corresponding to 1444 AD.

== Invasion ==
In 1458, Hussain Shah possessed a vast kingdom, the stretching from Kol (Aligarh) to Tirhut. The rulers of Orissa, long Sharqi feudatories since Mahmud's reign, ceased tribute during Jaunpur's internal crisis. Husain was also determined to expand his kingdom. He first subjugated Tirhut and advanced into Orissa. He sent detachments across the country for widespread plunder. Nizam-ud Din provides a highly exaggerated figure of the Sharqi army of 300,000 cavalry and 1,400 elephants. Though the force was undoubtedly large enough to intimidate the Gajapati ruler into avoiding a pitched battle. The powerful ruler of Orissa, Kapilendra Deva, found himself unable to resist the Sharqi forces. He submitted to Sultan Husain, sought peace, and presented him with thirty elephants, one hundred horses, and many other valuable gifts. The discovery of a hoard of 71 Sharqi copper coins including 22 of Husain Shah at Bamra in Orissa further provides archaeological support for Sharqi military activity in the region. After securing tribute and booty, Sultan Husain returned to Jaunpur victorious.

== Aftermath ==
In the same year, Kapilendra was active in the Guntur region engaging with the Bahmanis. He sent his general Hamir with an army to aid the Velama chiefs against the Bahmanis. The Orissan forces surprised and decisively defeated the Bahmani army besieging Dewarkonda. Husain Shah on the other hand decided to expand westwards, repairing fort of Benares in 1465 and subjugating the Tomaras of Gwalior in 1466.

== See also ==
- Bahmani invasion of Orissa
- Mughal conquest of Orissa
- Bengal Sultanate conquest of Orissa

== Bibliography ==
- Banerji, R. D. (1951). History of Orissa. Vol. I. Calcutta: Prabasi Press.
- Hussain, Syed Ejaz (2025-10-27). Shiraz-I Hind: A History of Jaunpur Sultanate. BRILL. ISBN 978-90-04-75387-7.
- Saeed, Mian Muhammad (1972). The Sharqi Sultanate of Jaunpur: A Political & Cultural History. University of Karachi.
- Habib, Mohammad; Nizami, Khaliq Ahmad (1970). A Comprehensive History of India. Vol. 5, Part 2. People's Publishing House.
- Subrahmanyam, R. (1957). The Sūryavaṁśi Gajapatis of Orissa. Andhra University.
