= Bawan Buzurg =

Bawan Buzurg Bāwan Buzurg
- Village
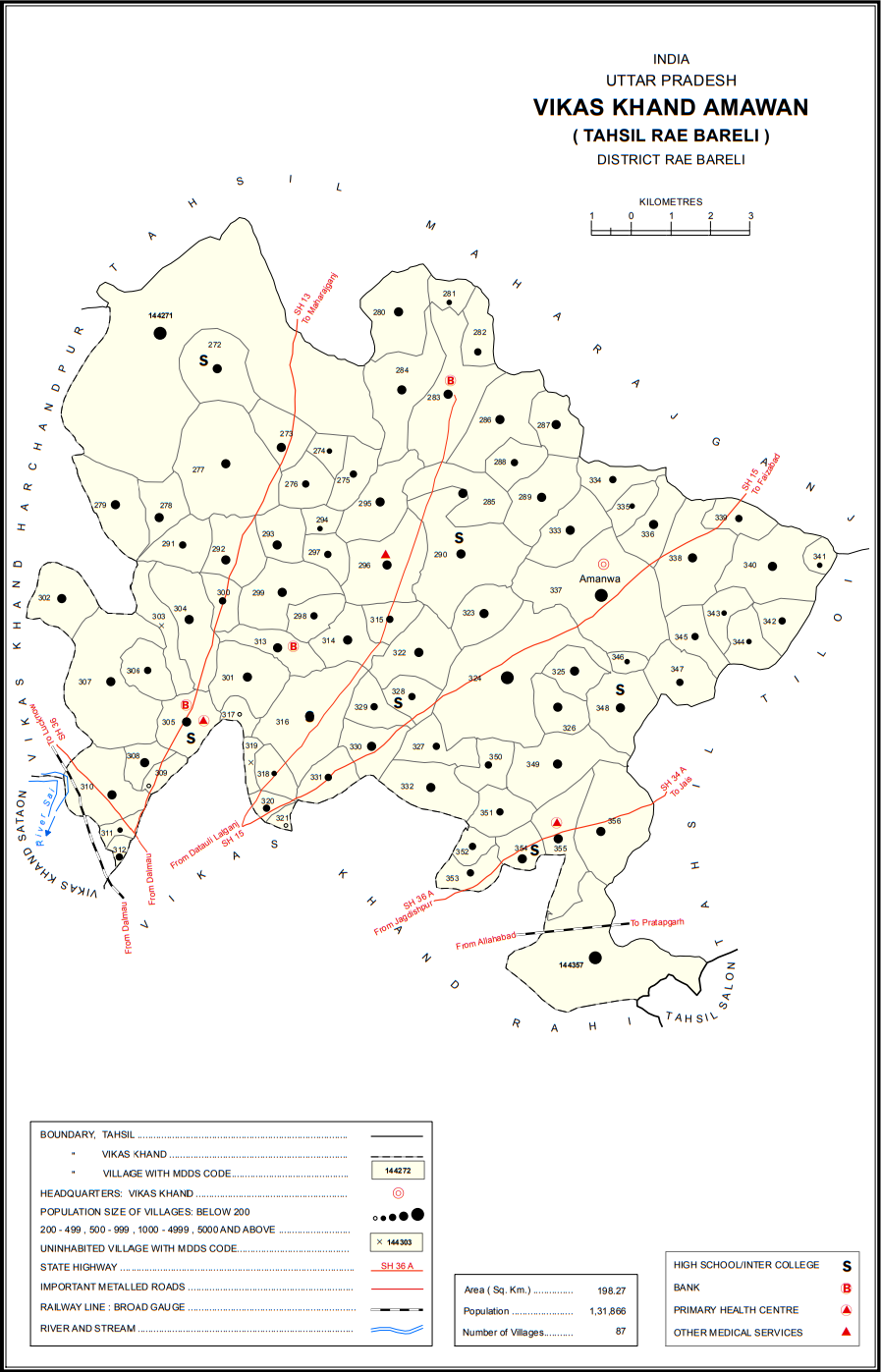
- Map showing Bawan Buzurg (#271) in Amawan CD block

- Location in Uttar Pradesh, India
- Coordinates: 26.376616°N 81.25205°E
- Country India: India
- State: Uttar Pradesh
- District: Raebareli

Area
  - Total: 23.304 km^{2} (8.998 sq mi)

Population (2011)
  - Total: 11,754
  - Density: 504.38/km^{2} (1,306.3/sq mi)

Languages
  - Official: Hindi
- Time zone: UTC+5:30 (IST)
- Vehicle registration: UP-35

Bawan Buzurg Balla is a village in Amawan block of Rae Bareli district, Uttar Pradesh, India. It is located near Maharajganj, south of the road to Bachhrawan and west of the road to Rae Bareli. It is the largest village in the district by area. As of 2011, its population is 11,754 people, in 2,154 households.

== History ==
Bawan Buzurg was historically noted for its production of shields, but this industry had ceased by the turn of the 20th century. At that point, it was described as a very large and scattered village that was mostly noteworthy for its size. Its population in 1901 was 4,709 people, including a Muslim minority of 540. It was held in joint zamindari tenure by Pathans And Manihars claiming descent from an Afghan named Faqir Khan, who supposedly conquered the place from the Bhars in the time of Ibrahim Shah of the Jaunpur Sultanate.

The 1961 census recorded Bawan Buzurg as comprising 26 hamlets, with a total population of 3,760 people (1,497 male and 2,263 female), in 978 households and 951 physical houses. The area of the village was given as 6,063 acres.

The 1981 census recorded Bawan Buzurg (as "Bawan Bujurg") as having a population of 6,502 people, in 707 households, and having an area of 2,330.67 hectares. The main staple foods were listed as juwar and rice.
