= Bengal–Jaunpur confrontation =

15th-century war in South Asia

Date	1415–1420
Location	Bengal
Result	Mithila–Bengal coalition victory

Belligerents
Bengal Sultanate (House of Ganesha)	Jaunpur Sultanate

Commanders and leaders
Raja Ganesha; Jalaluddin Muhammad Shah; Shiva Simha Singh	Ibrahim Shah; Nur Qutb Alam (Note: till 1416)

The Bengal-Jaunpaur confrontation was an early 15th-century conflict that stemmed from the Jaunpur Sultanate's opposition to the overthrowing of the Bengal Sultanate's founding dynasty, the Ilyas Shahi, by Raja Ganesha. After diplomatic pressure from the Timurid and Ming empires and direct combat support of Shivasimha, the King of Mithila. Jaunpur's sultan Ibrahim Shah Sharqi was convinced to abstain from attacking Bengal.

== Nur Qutb Alam ==
With the persecution of Bengali Muslims following Raja Ganesha's coup d'état, Nur Qutb Alam wrote a letter to Sultan Ibrahim Sharqi of Jaunpur to liberate Bengal. He also sent a letter to his father's disciple Ashraf Jahangir Semnani, who was in Jaunpur, to also request Sharqi to do so. Responding to the request, Ibrahim Sharqi proceeded towards Bengal, which threatened Ganesha's rule. Ganesha pleaded to Alam to stop the invasion, but Alam's condition was for him to accept Islam. However, Ganesha's wife forbade her husband to convert and instead they offered his son, Jadu, to the Shaykh. With Alam's guidance and mentorship, Jadu became a Muslim with the name Muhammad, and ascended the throne as Jalaluddin Muhammad Shah. Alam then requested Sharqi to return to Bengal, though he refused, thus continuing the Bengal-Jaunpaur war.

Another account of Nur Qutb Alam and his role during the conflict was that he was asked by Raja Ganesha for help due to the immanent threat of invasion soon after Ganesha usurped the throne. Qutb Alam eventually came to the agreement that Raja Ganesha's son, Jadu, would convert to Islam and rule in his place. Raja Ganesha agreed and Jadu started ruling Bengal as Jalaluddin Muhammad Shah in 1415.

== Foreign mediation ==
A diplomat in the court of Shahrukh Mirza recorded that the Timurid ruler of Herat intervened during the Bengal-Jaunpur conflict after a request from the Sultan of Bengal. The record speaks of Shahrukh Mirza "directing the ruler of Jaunpur to abstain from attacking the King of Bengal, or to take the consequence upon himself. To which the intimation of the Jaunpur ruler was obedient, and desisted from his attacks upon Bengal". Records from Ming China state that the Yongle Emperor sent Hou Xian to mediate between Jaunpur and Bengal after the Bengali ambassador in his Peking court complained of the conflict.

He was also directly supported by the King of Mithila who was also his friend, Shiva Singh of Oiniwar dynasty in his battle against Ibrahim Sharqi of Jaunpur Sultanate. The mention of this battle is stated in both Arakanese accounts and Mithila accounts.

== Power struggle of Raja Ganesha ==
The war began in 1415 and ended in 1420. The Jaunpaur Sultanate challenged the newly emerged Hindu dynasty of Raja Ganesha. Raja Ganesha was later removed as a result but his son Jalaluddin Muhammad Shah converted to Islam and ruled the Sultanate. Parts of the Jaunpur Sultanate was annexed by Bengal and peace was established between the two states.

== See also ==
- Jaunpur-Bhojpur War
