= Siege of Delhi (1452) =

Siege part of the Lodi–Sharqi War

- Part of Lodi–Sharqi War
Date	1452
Location	Delhi, Delhi Sultanate
Result	Lodi victory
Territorial changes	Status quo ante bellum

Belligerents
Jaunpur Sultanate	Delhi Sultanate

Commanders and leaders
Mahmud Shah; Darya Khan Lodi	Sayyad Shamsuddin; Shah Sikandar Sarwani; Bibi Matto

Strength
170,000 cavalry and infantry 1,400 elephants	Unknown

Casualties and losses
Unknown	Unknown

The Siege of Delhi (1452) was a military campaign during the Lodi–Sharqi War in which Sultan Mahmud Shah Sharqi of the Jaunpur Sultanate besieged the city of Delhi. The siege was launched in an attempt to overthrow the newly established Lodi dynasty and claim the throne of Delhi. Sultan Mahmud Shah, taking advantage of the advantage of Sultan Bahlul Lodi, advanced on Delhi. The city was defended by a small garrison under the command of Bahlul's son Khwaja Bayazid and his mother-in-law Bibi Matto. Despite being heavily outnumbered, the defenders held out through clever tricks and determined resistance until Bahlul Lodi returned with a relieving force. The campaign ended in a Lodi victory when the Sharqi army was defeated at Narela and forced to retreat to Jaunpur.

== Background ==
After the death of Muhammad Shah, his son Alauddin Alam Shah ascended the throne of the Sayyid dynasty in 1445. However, he was a weak ruler and inherited only a small territory around Delhi and Badaun. Most of the empire had already slipped into the hands of powerful local chiefs. Real authority in Delhi rested with his wazir, Hamid Khan. In 1448, Alam Shah permanently shifted to Badaun and left the capital in the hands of his two brothers-in-law, whose bitter rivalry soon led to violence and disorder. Taking advantage of the chaos, Hamid Khan seized the citadel, drove out the Sultan's family, and took control of the treasury. In 1451, Bahlul Lodi, who had already established firm control over Punjab up to Panipat, marched on Delhi. He cleverly removed Hamid Khan and declared himself the new Sultan, founding the Lodi dynasty. This turn of events greatly upset Mahmud Shah Sharqi of Jaunpur, whose wife was Alam Shah's sister. Encouraged by her and by some disloyal nobles from Alam Shah's court, Mahmud assembled a large army and decided to attack Delhi to claim the throne for himself.

== Siege ==
In 1452 AD, Mahmud Shah decided to invade Delhi, Bahlul Lodi tried to avoid war by sending humble messages and showing submissiveness. However, Mahmud ignored these overtures. Taking advantage of Bahlul's absence from Delhi, Mahmud marched with a massive army consisting of 170,000 cavalry and infantry along with 1,400 war elephants and laid siege to the capital. As soon as Bahlul received news of the invasion, he immediately turned back from Dipalpur and rushed to confront the Sharqi forces. The Afghan garrison at Delhi decided to wait until Bahlul arrived with a relieving force. Bahlul's son Khwaja Bayazid and mother-in-law Bibi Matto and other nobles shut themselves inside the fort to defend it. To make the defenders appear stronger than they actually were, Bibi Matto cleverly dressed up the women as men and posted them as guards along the walls. Meanwhile, Shah Sikandar Sarwani, a skilled archer shot enemy waterbag and struck it the ground with great force. When the Mahmud Shah and his men saw it, they became fearful of approaching the fort walls. Despite these clever ruses and the brave resistance put up by the defenders, the huge numerical superiority of the Sharqi army and their use of firearms eventually overwhelmed the garrison. Left with no choice, Bayazid Khan and Sarwani approached to negotiate terms of surrender. They sent Sayyid Shamsuddin with the keys of the fort to Darya Khan Lodi, one of Sultan Mahmud Sharqi's senior commanders who was a Lodi Afghan. Before handing over the keys, Sayyid Shamsuddin requested a private meeting and cleverly appealed to Darya Khan's tribal loyalty. He said, "Here are the keys of the fort, but as a Lodi Afghan yourself, you should not allow your own Lodi women — who are like your mothers and sisters — to be dishonoured by outsiders." Darya Khan was deeply moved by these words and immediately returned the keys without accepting them. He then went back to Mahmud Sharqi and cleverly convinced the Sultan that accepting the surrender was not wise at that moment. He argued that Sultan Bahlul was rapidly approaching Delhi with a large army. Instead of taking the fort immediately, it would be better to keep the garrison trapped inside while the main Sharqi forces moved to intercept and crush Bahlul's army. Once Bahlul was defeated, Delhi would fall automatically. Mahmud Sharqi, though somewhat doubtful, accepted Darya Khan's advice. Thus, the clever stratagem succeeded. The pressure on the fort was temporarily eased, and the defenders gained precious time while the Mahmud Shah dispatched a force towards Bahlul's approaching forces. The two armies met at Narela and a decisive battle followed. The Lodi army emerged victorious. The defeated Sharqi forces now fell back and returned to Sultan Mahmud Sharqi's camp, which was still besieging Delhi. The arrival of the broken and defeated troops spread confusion and panic in the Sharqi ranks. When Bibi Matto learned of this, she immediately ordered the drums of victory to be beaten from the fort. This unexpected sound greatly puzzled and demoralized Sultan Mahmud, who was already disheartened by his army's rout at Narela. Mahmud abandoned the siege and retreated to Jaunpur.

== Aftermath ==
After defeating the Sharqi forces, Bahlul Lodi moved quickly to consolidate his power. He subjugated Baran and seven parganas. From there, he went to Kol (Aligarh), securing the submission of and was allowed to keep his territory. Several other local governors and chiefs including those of Sakit, Kampil, Patiali, Bhogaon, Rapri, and Etawah also accepted Bahlul’s authority and were confirmed in their positions. Bahlul successfully brought the entire central Doab region under his control, from the areas around Delhi and Mewat in the west to the borders of the Jaunpur kingdom in the east. On the other hand, the Jaunpur Sultanate led its expedition against Ujjainiyas of Bhojpur.

== See also ==
- Jaunpur–Bhojpur War
- Lodi–Tomaras War

== Bibliography ==
- Hussain, Syed Ejaz (2025-10-27). Shiraz-I Hind: A History of Jaunpur Sultanate. BRILL. ISBN 978-90-04-75387-7.
- Saeed, Mian Muhammad (1972). The Sharqi Sultanate of Jaunpur: A Political & Cultural History. University of Karachi.
- Pandey, Awadh Bihari (1956). The First Afghan Empire in India, 1451-1526 A. D. Bookland. Archived from the original on 2018-09-25.
- Halim, Abdul (1961). History of the Lodi Sultans of Delhi and Agra. University of Dacca. Archived from the original on 2017-01-16.
- Habib, Mohammad; Nizami, Khaliq Ahmad (1970). A Comprehensive History of India. Vol. 5, Part 2. People's Publishing House.
- Haig, W. (1928). The Cambridge History of India: Turks and Afghans, edited by W. Haig. Vol. III. Cambridge University Press.
- Roy, Nirodbhusan (1958). Niamatullah's History of the Afghans: Part 1 - Lodi Period. Santiniketan Press.
- Lal, Kishori Saran (1963). Twilight of the Sultanate. Asia Publishing House. OCLC 500687579.
