= Mahmud Shah of Jaunpur =

Sultan of the Jaunpur Sultanate from 1440 to 1457

Mahmud Shah Sharqi
- Nasir-ud-Din
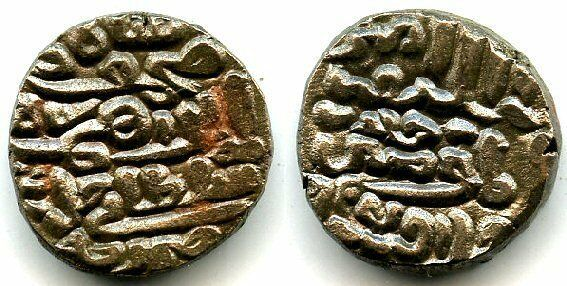

4th Sultan of Jaunpur
- Reign: 1440 – 12 September 1457
- Predecessor: Ibrahim Shah Sharqi
- Successor: Muhammad Shah Sharqi
- Born: 16 April 1429; Jaunpur, Jaunpur Sultanate (now in Uttar Pradesh, India)
- Died: 12 September 1457 (aged 28); Jaunpur (now in Uttar Pradesh, India)
- Spouse: Bibi Raji
- Issue: Muhammad Shah; Husain Shah; Hasan Khan; Jalal Khan; Qutb Khan
- House: Sharqi
- Father: Ibrahim Shah Sharqi
- Military career
- Service years: c. 1440–1457
- Conflicts: Kalpi War; Lodi–Sharqi War; Siege of Delhi (1452); Battle of Narela (1452)

Nasir-ud-Din Mahmud Shah Sharqi (16 April 1429 – 12 September 1457), also known as Mahmud Shah Sharqi, was the 4th ruler of the Jaunpur Sultanate, reigned from 1440 to 1457. He succeeded his father Ibrahim Shah Sharqi as sultan and was known for his bravery and generosity. Mahmud suppressed internal rebellions and expanded his territories, defeating neighboring empires in the process. He consolidated a larger area through battles with strong neighboring empires, ultimately advancing the Jaunpur Sultanate. Mahmud Shah Sharqi ruled over a vast area that included regions adjoining Bihar, Jharkhand, Uttar Pradesh, parts of Bengal, Nepal, Gondwana, Madhya Pradesh, and Odisha.

== Early life ==
Mahmud was the eldest son of Ibrahim Shah. After Ibrahim Shah's death, his son Mahmud Shah immediately succeeded him in 844/1440. Mahmud inherited a large and stable kingdom and was as ambitious as his father. According to Saeed, Mahmud Sharqi's first political venture was his invasion of Bengal, demonstrating his ambition for expansion and conquest.

== Reign ==
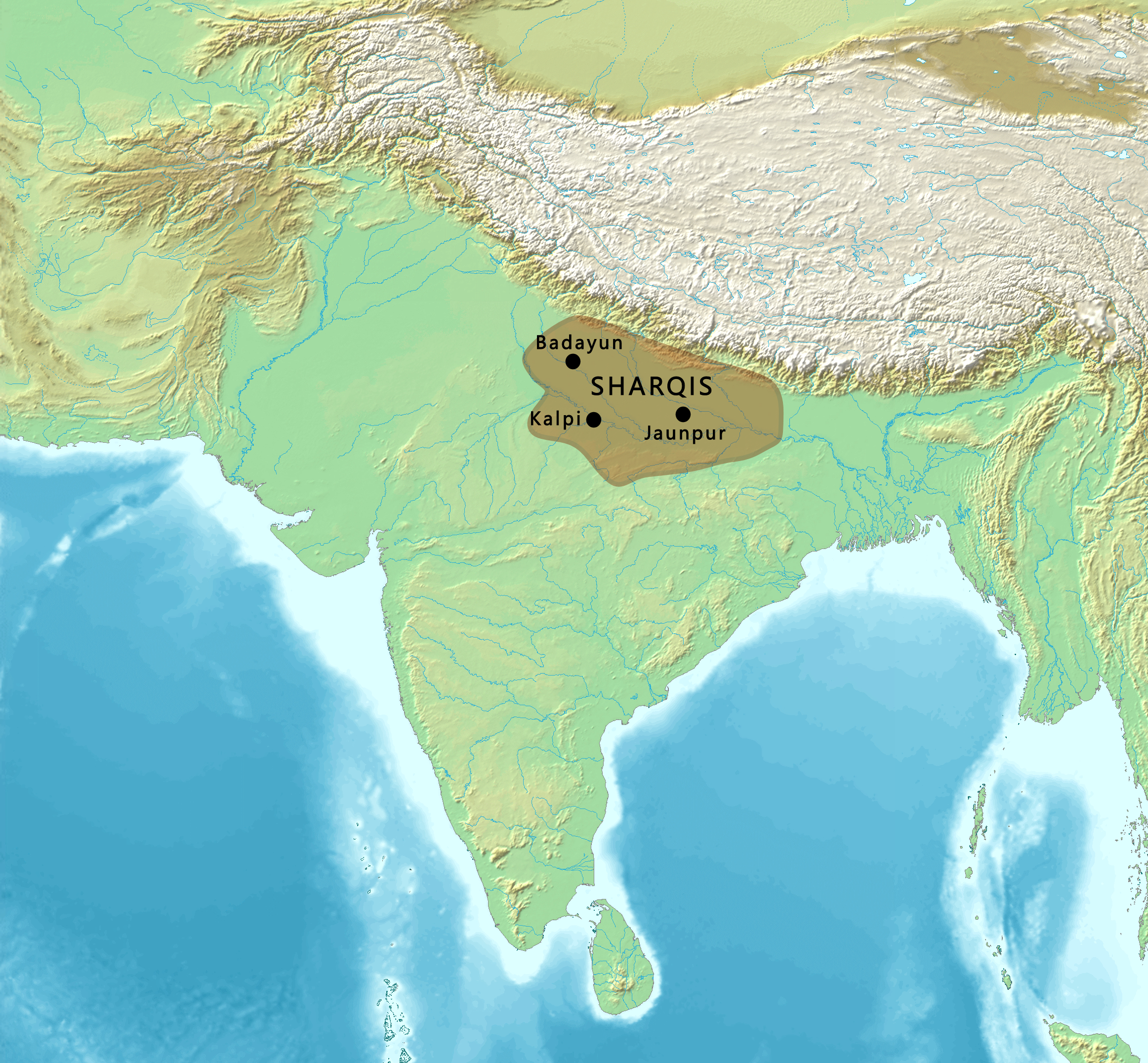
Sharqi dynasty of Jaunpur sultanate

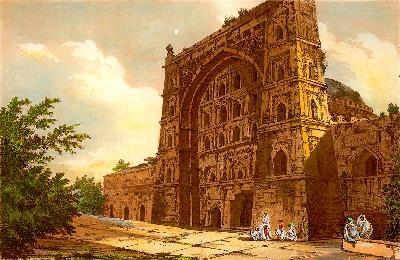
Atala Mosque of Jaunpur

He conducted numerous invasions of neighboring empires in order to expand his realm, launching campaigns against Bengal, Chunar, Orissa, Malwa, and Gondwana. As one of the most accomplished sultans of the Jaunpur Sultanate, he reigned successfully and also led campaigns against Kalpi. He also entered into a matrimonial alliance with the Sultan of Delhi, a neighboring kingdom. He was one of the most influential rulers of his time, successfully consolidating a significant portion of his empire.

== Military conquests ==
=== War with Kalpi ===
In 1443, Mahmud received news that the town of Shahpur had been devastated by Nasir Khan, the son of Qadir Shah. In response, Mahmud decided to attack Nasir Khan. He sought permission from Sultan Mahmud Khalji of Malwa, who granted it and even sent an ambassador with valuable presents. This led to Mahmud sending twenty-nine elephants as a present to the Malwa ruler. With a large army, Mahmud marched against Nasir Khan, who fled to Chanderi. Nasir Khan complained to Sultan Mahmud Khalji, who sent an ambassador with fine presents to Mahmud Sharqi, requesting the restoration of Kalpi to Nasir Khan. In response to another complaint, Mahmud Khalji marched with a large army to capture Mahmudabad. After several battles, a peace agreement was reached, with Mahmud Sharqi agreeing to return Kalpi and other captured towns to Nasir Khan after four months. After the agreement, both rulers returned to their respective capitals. Mahmud Sharqi celebrated his safe return by generously bestowing rich presents to nobles and scholars.

=== March against Chunar ===
In the third and fourth years of his reign, Mahmud Sharqi focused on consolidating his power by dealing with rebellious chiefs near Chunar, as reported by Nizam-ud Din and Firishta. The formidable fort of Chunar held great strategic importance, serving as a strong foothold in the region. Mahmud Sharqi employed force to subdue the rebellious chiefs, resulting in some of them being executed. Subsequently, he appointed his own officials, namely muqtas and revenue collectors, to govern these territories. This concerted effort bolstered Mahmud Sharqi's influence and control over the region.

=== Campaigns against Ujjainias of Bhojpur ===
As mentioned previously, following the passing of Ujjainiya leader Jagdeo, his successor, Sangram Deo, persisted with guerrilla attacks on local chiefs in Jaunpur until the death of Ibrahim Sharqi in 1440. Subsequently, the Ujjainiya leader, Sangram Deo, descended from the hills and established control over Bhojpur, making Dawa, located between Bikrampur and Dumraon in the modern Bhojpur district, his seat of power. After Sangram Deo's demise in vs 1510 (1453–4), his son, Ishwari Singh, assumed leadership. However, Ishwari Singh was inclined towards a hedonistic lifestyle, resulting in disarray within his autonomous fiefdom. Upon learning of the disorder, Sultan Mahmud Sharqi promptly dispatched a force to conquer the Ujjainiya stronghold. Despite Ishwari Singh fleeing to the forests, the Sharqi troops ultimately succeeded in apprehending and eliminating him. Subsequently, Dawa, the capital of the Ujjainiyas, was occupied by the Jaunpur Sultan, who appointed his official there before returning to Jaunpur. However, the Ujjainiyas persistently carried out guerrilla attacks on the Jaunpur soldiers until Mahmud Sharqi's demise in 1457. It's worth noting that all these military confrontations involving the Jaunpur army and Ujjainiya Rajputs occurred in and around the present-day Bhojpur district of Bihar and the eastern regions of modern-day Uttar Pradesh, contrary to Saeed's assertions referencing Rewa or Ujjain (Malwa).

=== Orissa campaign ===
According to Nizam-ud Din, after his Chunar campaign Mahmud Sharqi marched with his army against Orissa. He advanced into the country of Orissa and after much plunder returned with an enormous booty. Firishta has also recorded something similar.

=== War with Delhi Sultanate ===
Owing to the weakness of the Sultan of Delhi, Muhammad Shah, both Ibrahim Shah of Jaunpur and Mahmud Khalji of Malwa invaded and occupied a large amount of Delhi Sultanate's territory. In 1451, Bahlul Khan Lodi assumed the throne of Delhi and established the Lodi dynasty.

In 1452, when Bahlul Khan Lodi was on a campaign in the Punjab, Mahmud Shah, along with Darya Khan Lodi laid siege to Delhi. Bahlul returned before the besiegers could make any significant impression upon the city's defenses. Bahlul captured a large number of Mahmud's transport animals, which were out at pasture. Soon, he was attacked by a large faction of the Jaunpur army, consisting of 30,000 horse and 30 elephants, which was commanded by Fath Khan. After Qutb Khan Lodi wounded Fath Khan's elephant with an arrow, the Jaunpur army fell into disarray, and Darya Khan Lodi withdrew his support. This resulted in a complete defeated and Mahmud retreated to Jaunpur. Mahmud suffered the losses of seven war elephants, and his general Fath Khan, who was beheaded.

==== Events at Shamsabad, death, and succession ====
In 1457, Mahmud Shah marched upon Shamsabad and was attacked by a force led by Qutb Khan Lodi and Darya Khan Lodi. Mahmud defeated this force, and Qutb Khan was taken prisoner and sent to Jaunpur. Before the fighting could begin again, Mahmud died and was succeeded by his eldest son Bhikan, who assumed the title Muhammad Shah and negotiated a peace treaty with the Lodis.

== Cultural contributions ==
During his reign, the Jaunpur Sultanate flourished and was prosperous. Mahmud Sharqi was a capable ruler who dedicated himself to strengthening his religion and sultanate. He is known to have commissioned the construction of several mosques, although specific details about these constructions are not widely documented. Additionally, he undertook the restoration of the Atala Mosque, Jaunpur which had been built by his predecessors. Sultan Mahmud Sharqi, much like his father, had a deep appreciation for art and architecture, as demonstrated by the construction of splendid buildings, palaces, and grand mosques across his kingdom. The capital city of Jaunpur, in particular, was embellished with exquisite mosques, with the Lal Darwazah Masjid (Ruby Gate Mosque) standing out as a notable example. Adjacent to this mosque, construction was completed on the splendid palace belonging to his favored queen, Bibi Raji, during the same period.Three Arabic inscriptions from the time of Mahmud have been discovered in Bihar. The earliest inscription, dated Rajab 1, 847 (25 October 1443), commemorates the construction of a Jāma mosque by a devout individual named Sayyid Ajmal. In the inscription, Ajmal is described as Sadr-i jahan at the behest of Malik- ush Sharq, Nasir, the son of Baha, who served as the muqta or governor of Khitta in Bihar during Mahmud Sharqi's reign in 1443-4. The only surviving piece of architecture of his reign is the Lal Darwaza mosque, commissioned by his queen, Bibi Raji.
