= Sikhera =

Village in Uttar Pradesh, India

Coordinates: 28.750°N 77.942°E

Sikhera is a village in Simbhaoli block of Hapur District in Uttar Pradesh state, India. This village has Tyagi community (Both Hindu Tyagi and Muslim Tyagi). It has a population of around 6500. It is one of Adarsh gram of Hapur district and has many facilities like Rajkiya Inter College, Government CHC Hospital, and playground. The village is located on NH9 (Garhmukteshwar – Delhi Road) and its distance from the national capital is just 70 km.

Economy of the Village

Agriculture is the main occupation in the village. Crops are wheat, rice, sugarcane, etc.
