= Lal Darwaza Mosque =

Mosque in Jaunpur, Uttar Pradesh, India

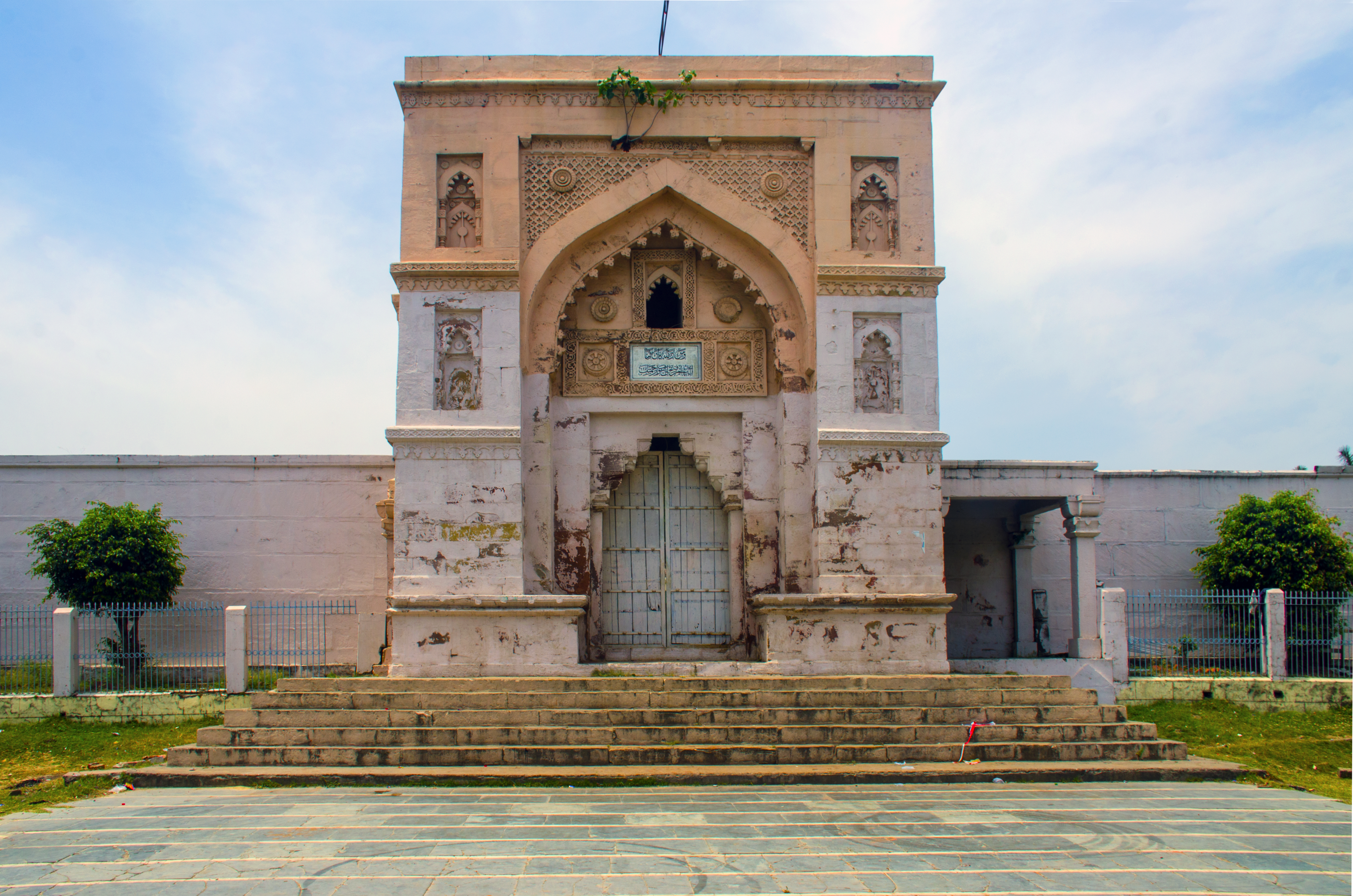
- The gate of the Lal Darwaza Mosque

- Location of the mosque in Uttar Pradesh

Religion
- Affiliation: Islam
- Ecclesiastical or organizational status: Mosque
- Status: Active

Location
- Location: Jaunpur, Jaunpur district, Uttar Pradesh
- Country: India
- Interactive map of Lal Darwaza Mosque
- Coordinates: 25°45′9″N 82°41′25″E

Architecture
- Type: Mosque architecture
- Style: Islamic; Sharqi
- Founder: Queen Rajye Bibi
- Completed: 1447 CE

Specifications
- Direction of façade: East
- Dome: One

The Lal Darwaza Mosque, also known as the Red Portal Mosque and the Ruby Gate Mosque, is a mosque located in Jaunpur, in the Jaunpur district of the state of Uttar Pradesh, India. Completed in 1447 CE by Queen Rajye Bibi, the mosque is dedicated to Sayyid Ali Dawood Kutubbudin, a Muslim saint.

== History ==
The Lal Darwaza Mosque was built with the palace of Bibi Raji, who was the Queen of Sultan Mahmood Sharqi, a ruler of the Sharqi dynasty. The stones and materials for construction of Lal Darwaz Mosque was transported from Varanasi to Jaunpur and consist of stones from demolished temples from fifth to fourteenth centuries. Partly stones were taken from demolished temples of Padmesvara, near Vishwanath temple of Banares, in 1296. The Lal Darwaza Mosque was formed to serve as a private mosque for the Queen.

Bibi Raji established a religious school in the area surrounding the Lal Darwaza in Jaunpur for all the local Muslim residents. The school (or Madrasa) was named Jamia Hussainia and it exists till date.

== Architecture ==
The mosque was built in 1447 (as per inscription of this mosque), during the reign of Sultan Mahmud Sharqi, by Queen Bibi Rajyi, and was dedicated to Maulana Sayyid Ali Dawood Kutubbudin, a celebrated saint (Maulana) of Jaunpur. The descendants of the saint live in the Mohalla Bazaar Bhua Pandariba Jaunpur and Mohalla Namaz Gah Laldarwaza.

Mohalla Namaz Gah was named by Bibi Rajye, who also built a monastery and a madrassa adjacent to the mosque. The college was staffed by capable ulema and scholars and professors, and admitted students from all over the country. "Muslim Khwateen ki Taleem" Pg 36 mentions that one school for female education was founded in 845/1441 at Jaunpur by Queen Bibi Rajye.

860 Hijri tamer e qadeem and tameer e mehrab in 1409 Hijri.

Lal Darwaza (Ruby Gate) Mosque owes its name to the vermilion-painted lofty gateway of Bibi Rajye’s royal palace, that stood adjacent to it. It is situated in the extreme north west and known by names mohalla Laldarwza or Begum Ganj.

The mosque has three gateways, of which the eastern one is the largest and most important gateway.

== Tourist attraction ==
Jaunpur is known for its mosques that have been the storehouses of history of medieval India. Much of this recognition is due to Lal Darwaza Mosque. With an influx of a large number of visitors, Lal Darwaza Mosque has become one of the prime tourist attractions in Jaunpur.

== See also ==
- Islam in India
- List of mosques in India
