= Malik Sarwar =

Sultan of Jaunpur from 1394 to 1399

- Sultan-ush-Sharq; Khwaja-i-Jahan

Sultan of Jaunpur
- Reign: May 1394 – 1399
- Predecessor: Position established
- Successor: Mubarak Shah
- Died: 1399

Sultan-ush-Sharq Atabak-i-Azam Malik Sarwar (died 1399) was the first Sultan of Jaunpur from 1394 to 1399 and the founder of the Sharqi dynasty.

== Early life ==
Malik Sarwar was an eunuch of common birth, possibly a slave of African descent, in the Delhi Sultanate. The first mention of him in contemporary records describes him as the custodian of royal jewelry during the reign of Firuz Shah Tughlaq. He was later appointed Shahnah-i-Shahr (governor of the city) of Delhi.

He played an important role in the accession of Muhammad Shah IV to the throne of Delhi, and was appointed the wazir and awarded the title of Khwaja-i-Jahan. He later made Malik Sarwar the governor of the eastern provinces, awarding him the title of Sultan-ush-Sharq (sultan of the east).

Malik Sarwar continued to play an important role in the politics surrounding the throne, and in the accession of Mahmud Shah.

== Reign ==
In May 1394, when the news of a rebellion in Jaunpur arrived. Mahmud appointed Malik Sarwar to his earlier position of the governor of the eastern provinces, and dispatched with him a large army, with twenty elephants. Malik Sarwar defeated the rebels and returned to Jaunpur.

At this point, he was practically independent as the Delhi Sultanate was in decline. He issued coins in his name, and had the Friday sermon read in his name, and gave himself the title of Atabak-i-Azam (the great lord).

== Issue ==
As Malik Sarwar was a eunuch, he had to adopt an heir. He adopted Malik Mubarak Qaranfal and his brothers, and Malik Mubarak would later succeed him as Mubarak Shah. Mubarak Shah would be succeeded by his younger brother Ibrahim Shah, and thus, the Sharqi dynasty was established, taking its name from Malik Sarwar's title.

== Bibliography ==
- Saeed, Mian Muhammad (1972). The Sharqi of Jaunpur: A Political & Cultural History. University of Karachi.
- Haig, Wolseley (1928). The Cambridge History of India. Vol. III. Cambridge University Press.
