= Darweshpura, Bihar =

Darweshpura
- Village
- Location in Bihar Darweshpura (India)
- Coordinates: 25.074657°N 85.598899°E
- Country: India
- Region: East India
- State: Bihar
- Division: Patna
- District: Nalanda
- Taluk: Katrisarai
- Elevation: 69 m (226 ft)

Languages
  - Spoken: maghi, Hindi, Urdu
- Time zone: UTC+5:30 (IST)
- PIN: 805105
- Telephone code: +91-6325
- ISO 3166 code: IN-BR

Darweshpura (also known as Deveshpura) is a village in the taluk of Katrisarai of the Nalanda district, in the state of Bihar, Eastern India. The village is situated on a fertile plain near the Sakri river, 8 kilometres (5.0 mi) from Pawapuri, 21 kilometres (13 mi) South of Bihar Sharif, the district headquarters, and 91 kilometres (57 mi) from Patna, the state capital.Darwashpura is also none for its large growth of patty (rice)and potatoes.

It has a humid subtropical climate, with hot summers and cool winters. The predominant economic activity in the village has traditionally been subsistence agriculture and sheep and goat herding.
