= Husain Shah of Jaunpur =

Sultan of Jaunpur from 1458 to 1494

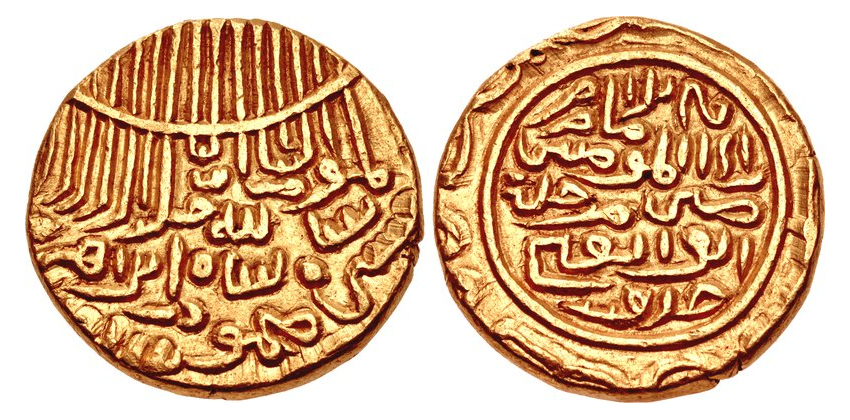

6th Sultan of Jaunpur
- Reign: 1458 – 1494
- Predecessor: Muhammad Shah
- Successor: Sultanate abolished Barbak Lodi (as governor)
- Died: 1505
- Spouse: Bibi Khunza
- Issue: Jalal Khan
- Father: Mahmud Shah
- Mother: Bibi Raji

Husain Shah Sharqi was the sixth and last sultan of the Jaunpur Sultanate.

A son of Mahmud Shah, he succeeded his brother Muhammad Shah in 1458. Husain was an ambitious ruler and began a policy of expanding his kingdom. After initial successes at Orissa and Gwalior, he began a long campaign against the Delhi Sultanate.

In 1479, he was forced to flee Jaunpur and remained in Kahalgaon in Bihar where he was granted asylum. He died in 1505.

== Reign ==
The last ruler Hussain Shah signed a four years' peace treaty with Bahlul Lodi in 1458.

=== Campaigns in Orissa and Gwalior ===
At the beginning of his reign, Husain Shah invaded Orissa and Kapileshwar Deva presented him with thirty elephants and a hundred horses.

In 1466, he sent a large army to besiege Gwalior, which was held by Raja Kirti Singh. After a long siege, Kirti Singh agreed to become a vassal of Jaunpur and pay tribute.

=== Campaign against the Delhi Sultanate ===
Later, in order to invade Delhi reached the banks of the Yamuna with a very large army in 1478. Sultan Bahlul Lodi tried to secure peace by offering to retain only Delhi and govern it as a vassal of Hussain Shah but he rejected the offer.

The flight of Sultan Hussain Sharki of Jaunpur, A.D. 1479

As a result, Sultan Bahlul crossed the Yamuna and defeated him. Hussain Shah agreed for truce but again captured Etawah and marched towards Delhi with a huge army and he was again defeated by Bahlul Lodi. He was able to make peace this time also. In March 1479, he again arrived at the banks of Yamuna. He was again defeated by Bahlul Lodi and lost the Parganas of Kampil, Patiali, Shamsabad, Suket, Koil, Marhara and Jalesar to the advancing army of the Delhi Sultan. After the successive defeats in the battles of Senha, Rapri and Raigaon Khaga, he was finally defeated on the banks of the Rahab, after which Bahlul Lodi appointed Mubarak Khan to Jaunpur. Hussain Shah re-assembled his forces, expelled Mubarak Khan and re-occupied Jaunpur, until Bahlul drove him out again.

== Exile and later years ==
He fled to Kahalgaon in Bihar, where he was granted asylum by sultan Alauddin Husain Shah of Bengal. He spent his last days there and even minted his own coins, and his son Jalal Khan was married to a daughter of Alauddin Husain Shah. In 1486, Bahlul Lodi placed his eldest surviving son Barbak Shah Lodi on the throne of Jaunpur. He died in 1505, and was buried at Jaunpur.

== Personality ==
Husain was interested in art and music. He contributed significantly to the development of khayal.

=== Religious beliefs ===
It was during Hussain Shah' rule that a claimant to be the mahdi of all Muslims, Muhammad Jaunpuri, appeared and Hussain Shah was an admirer of him.

== Bibliography ==
- Saeed, Mian Muhammad (1972). The Sharqi of Jaunpur: A Political & Cultural History. University of Karachi.
