= Shamsabad, Farrukhabad =

Shamsabad Khor Nagar
- Town
- Location in Uttar Pradesh, India
- Coordinates: 27.535856°N 79.438113°E
- Country: India
- State: Uttar Pradesh
- District: Farrukhabad

Population (2011)
  - Total: 28,454

Languages
  - Official: Hindi
  - Literacy: 59.96%
  - Sex ratio: 903

Demographics
- Time zone: UTC+5:30 (IST)
- Postal code: 209503
- Vehicle registration: UP-76

Shamsabad historically known as Khor Nagar is a town and a nagar panchayat in Farrukhabad district in the Indian state of Uttar Pradesh.

== History ==
Shamsabad is a much older settlement than both Farrukhabad and Kaimganj, both of which were founded in the early 18th century A.D. Kampil, a nearby small town situated about 25 km to the west of Shamsabad is also an ancient site. It is associated with the Panchalas of Mahabharat fame. Historians believe that during their eastern migration, Indo-European language speaking people moved towards the middle Gangetic region and settlements like Kampil and Amritpur - a small town about 25 km from Shamsabad across the Ganges - also grew up.

During most of the ninth to twelfth centuries, Shamsabad - then known as Khor Nagar (Khor meaning king and nagar meaning city) - was ruled first by the Pratihars, then by the Gaharwars dynasties from Kannauj. It is variously said that one Prajan Pal or Jai Singh Dev or Rai Singh Gaharwar was the ruler at the time of Shams Uddin Iltitmish's invasion circa 1212 and Shamsabad is named after the latter. However, Zia Uddin Barni in his 'Tareekh-e- Firozshahi' (written about 150 years after the death of Shams Uddin Iltitmish) still uses the name of the place as 'Khor Nagar' when describing an unusual incident which occurred in the Ganges here.

During Delhi's Sultanant period (1202-1526), Shamsabad was quite an important place, being the subedari-provincial-capital. A road from the east to Delhi went through it.

Shamsabad, being a strategic town on the fluid boundary between the Lodis of Delhi (1451–1526) and the Sharqi kings of Jaunpur, was a hot spot and exchanged hands between the two. There is still a graveyard in the east of Shamsabad known as 'ganj-e-shaheedan' where a battle was fought between the Lodis and the Sharqis. Both Khizr Khan (1414–1421) and Sikandar Lodi (1489–1517), Delhi Sultanat kings, came to Shamsabad. Sikandar Lodi camped near Shamsabad for six months and a village called Sikandar pur Mahmood to the west of Shamsabad might have been named after this event. Sikandar Lodi had Imad Khan Farmoli and Sulaiman Khan Farmoli as his Subedars in Shamsabad. Another village almost adjacent to Sikandar pur Mahmood is known as Imad pur. This strengthens the view that both of these villages were named after Sikandar Lodi and Imad Khan respectively.

The Moghals who succeeded in establishing their kingdom in 1526 also took interest in Shamsabad. Babar made Vikrama Jeet Sisodia his Subedar -provincial governor- of Shamsabad in 1528.

Humayun, following his defeat by Sher Shah Suri circa 1541 at Chausa (after which village the famous mango variety is named) near Kannauj fled to Delhi through Shamsabad. The Saiyyeds of Shamsabad provided boats for Humayun as the Ganges was in spate. Sher Shah was in hot pursuit and this help by the Saiyyeds made him furious. However, considering the religious sanctity of the Saiyyeds he gave them the lesser punishment of having their ears cut off but dealt with the others who helped Humayun much more severely.

In Akbar's reign (1556–1605) Shamsabad was made a pargane (Tehsil) of Kannauj Sarkar (District). Mirza Tahir and Rai Damodar Das -a Kayastha- were Akbar's chief officers who rebuilt Shamsabad from 1589. A village adjacent to Shamsabad at its northern boundary is known as Akbar pur Damodar. A mohalla called Manjhli Haveli is said to be named after the residence of the middle son of Rai Damodar Das. This mohalla is also in the northern part of Shamsabad. There was a reputed madrasa (school) in Shamsabad during Akbar's reign and even his courtier, the well-known historian Abdul Qadir Badyuni, stayed here for sometime.

After the weakening of the Moghal Empire and the founding of Farrukhabad in 1714 by Mohammed Khan Bangash (a Subedar of Farrukh Siyar, the Moghal King in Delhi), Shamsabad was de facto ruled by the Bangash Nawabs till their treaty with East India Company in June 1802. Thereafter, until 1947, it was under the British rule with the exception of a few months in the First War of Independence in 1857.

Shamsabad and its people also played some part in this war. Finally, the English troops defeated the freedom fighters in January 1858 at a place called Jhanna Khar to the west of Shamsabad.

Shamsabad came under the Notified/Town Area Act in 1908.

It has 33 mohallas and in the 2011 census its provisional population was 27,385.

== Geography ==
Shamsabad is situated at 27.32°N 79.28°E at a distance of 25 km to the west of Farrukhabad.

Most probably the river Ganges used to flow beside its northern boundary. A mohalla, locality called the Ghatiapur crossing point, is reminiscent of this. The Ganges is about 4 km away now.

== Weather ==
Shamsabad is hot and dusty in peak summer months of May & June and cold in the winter months of December & January. Summer temperatures can rise to early 40 degree Celsius and minimum Winter temperature can reach 0 degree Celsius. The monsoon season starts from end June and ends in September with about 26 inches of rainfall.

== Social scene ==
=== Monuments and buildings ===
1. ChauMukhey Mahadev Temple:- This temple is about 1 km northwest of Shamsabad. The temple was built by the King Khor and this was the part of fort. The main object of worship is dated to be about ninth century.
2. Kot Ki Masjid/Shahi/Congregational Mosque:- This is built on the site of a Tell ( mound ) which is the site of old settlements. This mosque has a chronogram engraved on the stone on the top of the central door which shows that it was built in 702 Hijri circa 1302 AD by one Muhammed Khan. He might have been a subedar or some other official in Ala Uddin Khilji's reign (1296–1316). It is also said that the mosque was built on the ruins of the fort of King Khor as Shamsabad was named later.
3. Meer Saheb Ki Ziarat:- It is believed that a saint Meer Azeez Ullah Makki is buried here. His period coincides with Shams Uddin Iltitmish's invasion period. However, the structure is not old.
4. Khanzado Ka Gumbad:- It is in the east of Shamsabad and has the grave of one Mohammad Shah khan khanzade. According to some historians it was constructed during Shan Jahan's reign (1628–1658).
5. Sati Ki Mathia:- It is in the northeast of Shamsabad.
6. Baradari is in the southeast of Shamsabad. It has the grave of Nawab Mirza Khan, younger brother of Nawab Rashid Khan whose architecturally fine tomb is in Mau Rashidabad, near Kaimganj. Nawab Mirza Khan was killed fighting in Deccan in the late 17th century but as he was the Chief Officer of Shamsabad during Aurangzeb's reign (1658–1706) it was Mirza Khan's wish that he be buried in Shamsabad.
7. Grave of Saiyyed Kamal in the east of Shamsabad popularly known as Khirni Wale Baba. In the opinion of some believers this grave has miraculous powers.
8. Tomb of Shah Husain:- It is in the southwest of Shamsabad and a saint, Shah Husain of the early 19th century, is buried here
9. Bara Imam Bara:- There is a central 'Imam Bara' which was established in the late 19th century, the present building is about 80 years old.
10. Karbala:- A copy of the mausoleum of Imam Husain in Iraq.

In 1867 a large plot of land was converted into a family graveyard and Karbala by Nawab Jafri Begum. The complex was built by the architects from Lucknow. Its central dome is well proportioned.
Every year the 'tazias' (paper copies of Karbala) are buried here by most of the Shias of Shamsabad.

=== Social and cultural activities and festivals ===
1. Dussehra is observed here with traditional zest. Processions are taken out for 12 days or more and Ram Leela - a dramatic version of Ramayan stories is dramatised in the evenings.
2. Deepawali, Holi & Janmashtmi are celebrated with great enthusiasm.
3. Kite flying, with matches sometimes thrown in, is the main attraction for youngsters during Holi.
4. Eid Ul Fittar, Eid Ul Fittar is celebrated here by very great zeal of the Muslim people.
5. Urs:- Qawwalis - a form of devotional Sufi music at Meer Saheb Ki Ziarat. This yearly commemorative event is normally held in April with great enthusiasm.
6. Bara Wafat:- Every year the birthday of Islamic prophet Muhammed is celebrated according to the Hijri calendar with great zeal and taking out of large processions.
7. Moharram:- Moharram is observed here with traditional 'majlises' -sittings where the tragedy of Karbala is described -and procession of 'alams' -copies of the standard of Imam Husain - and 'tazias' are taken out.

== Education and health ==
There is one government primary school. One junior high school, one Islamic school, and two intermediate colleges, one for boys and another for girls, apart from many private and government lower schools. A.V.Inter College is for boys and was established in 1956. One college for girls, Chandra Kumari Jwala Shankar Raizada Balika Vidyalaya, was established by late. Shri Jwala Shankar Raizada and his wife Chandra Kumari Raizada.

Chunni Devi R.N. Memorial Mahavidyalaya is the only degree college in Shamsabad, established in 2012 by Shree Prakash Rastogi.

One women's hospital which was built by private donations and run by the provincial government has been working off and on since 1914.

=== Employment opportunities ===
The youth of Shamsabad mostly go to Delhi to get some sort of employment there. Some jobs are provided by chewing tobacco cottage industry. Guava orchards around Shamsabad also provide seasonal employment apart from general agricultural activities, especially tobacco growing, which is very labour oriented.
