= Jaunpur Sultanate =

Medieval kingdom in India (c. 1394–1494)

Sultanate of Jaunpur سلطنتِ جونپور
- 1394–1494
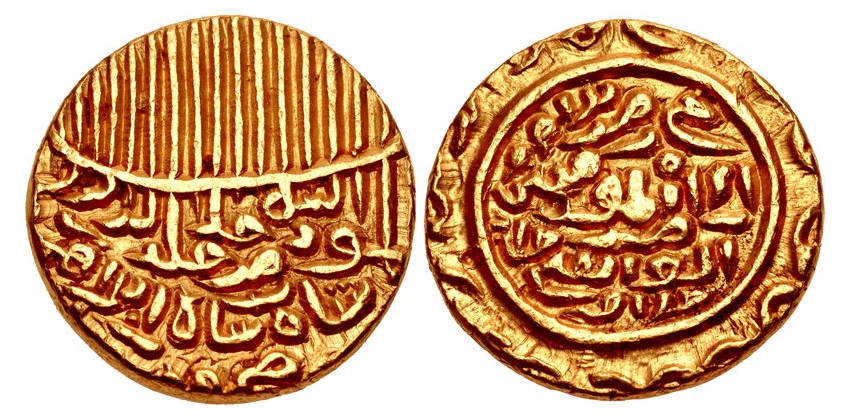
- Coin of Hussain Shah, dated 1458-1479

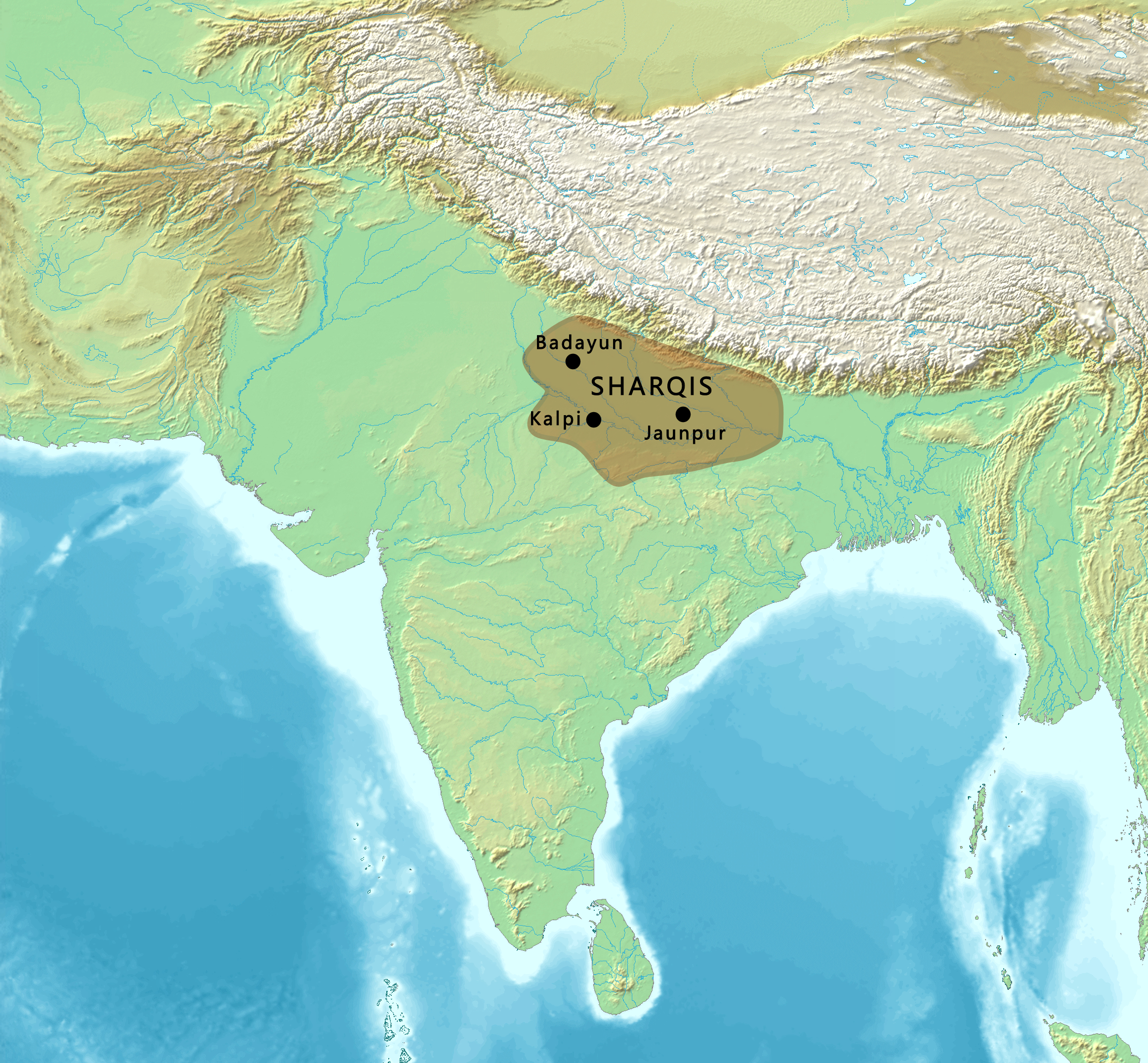
- Territory of the Jaunpur Sultanate (Sharqis) circa 1475, with neighbouring polities
- Capital: Jaunpur (1394–1493); Kahalgaon (capital-in-exile) (1494–1505)
- Common languages: Persian (official); Hindustani, Bhojpuri, Awadhi, Nepali (common); Arabic (religious); Sanskrit (literature)
- Religion: Shia Islam
- Government: Monarchy
- Sultan
  - 1394–1399: Malik Sarwar (first)
  - 1458–1493: Husain Shah (last)
- History
  - Established: 1394
  - Lodi–Sharqi War: 1452–1500
  - Disestablished: 1494
Preceded by	Succeeded by
Tughlaq dynasty	Lodi dynasty; Bengal Sultanate
- Today part of: India; Nepal

The Jaunpur Sultanate (Persian: سلطنتِ جونپور) was a late medieval Indian Muslim state which ruled over much of what is now the Indian states of Uttar Pradesh and Bihar and southern Nepal between 1394 and 1494. It was founded in 1394 by Khwajah-i-Jahan Malik Sarwar, a eunuch slave and former wazir of Sultan Nasiruddin Muhammad Shah, amidst the disintegration of the Delhi Sultanate under the ruling Tughlaq dynasty. Centred in Jaunpur, the sultanate extended authority over a large part of the Ganges-Yamuna Doab. It reached its greatest height under the rule of Sultan Ibrahim Shah, who also vastly contributed to the development of Islamic education in the Sultanate. In 1494, Sultan Hussain Shah Sharqi was defeated by the forces of the Afghan ruler Bahlul Lodi, sultan of the Lodi dynasty of the Delhi Sultanate at Benares after which Hussain fled to Kahalgaon in modern-day Bihar where the Sultan of Bengal assigned him a pargana. Here he was allowed to mint his own coins and was promised help from Bengal in recovering his kingdom. He died in 1505.

== Background ==
The Sharqi dynasty was founded by Malik Sarwar, a eunuch slave of probably African origin. He was succeeded by his adopted son, Malik Qaranfal, who was previously a Hindu slave-boy and a water-bearer of Firoz Shah Tughlaq. However, according to a contemporary writer, Yahya Sirhindi, Malik Qaranfal was a member of the Sayyid dynasty. Malik Qaranfal became the next sultan with the title of Mubarak Shah. He was succeeded by his brother, Ibrahim Shah.

== History ==
=== Malik Sarwar ===
In 1389, Malik Sarwar received the title of Khwajah-i-Jahan. In 1394, he was appointed as the governor of Jaunpur and received his title of Malik-us-Sharq from Sultan Nasir-ud-Din Mahmud Shah Tughluq (1394–1413). Soon, he established himself as an independent ruler and took the title of Atabak-i-Azam. He then suppressed the rebellions in Etawah, Koil and Kanauj. He was also able to bring under his control Kara, Awadh, Dalmau, Bahraich and South Bihar. The Rai of Jajnagar and the ruler of Lakhnauti acknowledged his authority and sent him several elephants.

==== War with the Ujjainiyas of Bhojpur ====
During the reign of Malik Sarwar, Jaunpur became embroiled in a 100-year war with the neighbouring Ujjainiyas of Bhojpur in modern-day Bihar. The Ujjainiya chieftain, Raja Harraj was initially successful in the forces of Malik Sarwar however the Ujjainiyas were defeated in subsequent battles and retreated into the forests and resorted to guerrilla warfare.

=== Mubarak Shah ===
Malik Sarwar was succeeded by his adopted son Malik Qaranfal after his death, who assumed the title of Mubarak Shah, ruled for three years, and issued coins in his own name. After assuming power in 1399, Mubarak Shah struck coins in his own name and the Khutba was read in his name. During his reign, Mallu Iqbal tried to recover Jaunpur but failed. He was succeeded by his younger brother Ibrahim after he died in 1402, who took the title of Shams-ud-Din Ibrahim Shah.

=== Ibrahim Shah ===
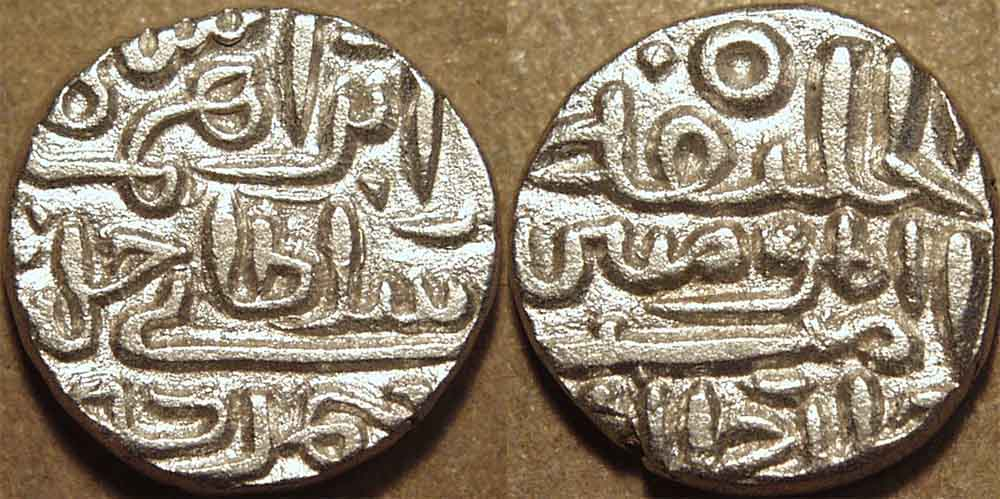
Billon coin of 32 rattis issued by Ibrahim Shah of Jaunpur (1402–1440)

The Jaunpur Sultanate attained its greatest height under the younger brother of Mubarak Shah, who ruled as Shams ud-din Ibrahim Shah (ruled 1402–1440). To the east, his kingdom extended to Bihar, and to the west, to Kanauj; he even marched on Delhi at one point. Under the aegis of a Muslim holy man named Nur Qutb Alam, he threatened the Sultanate of Bengal under Raja Ganesha.

Ibrahim Shah was a patron of Islamic learning and established several colleges for this purpose. A large number of scholarly works on Islamic theology and law were produced during his reign, which include the Hashiah-i-Hindi, the Bahar-ul-Mawwaj and the Fatwa-i-Ibrahim Shahi. He constructed several monuments in a new regional style of architecture known as the Sharqi. During his reign, Sultan Nasiruddin Mahmud Shah II Tughluq took refuge in Jaunpur to get rid of the control of Mallu Iqbal over him. But he did not treat Sultan Mahmud Shah well. As a result, his relations with the Sultan became bitter and Mahmud Shah occupied Kanauj. In 1407, he tried to recover Kanauj but failed. His attempt to conquer Bengal also failed. He was succeeded by his eldest son Mahmud Shah after his death.

=== Mahmud Shah Sharqi ===
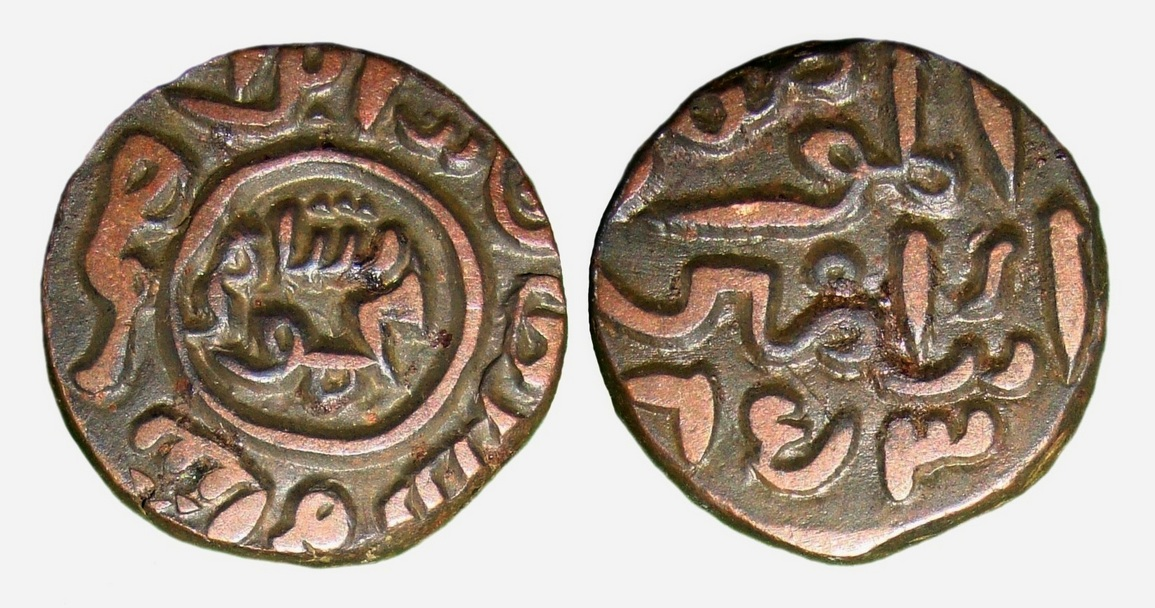
Double falus of Mahmud Shah

Mahmud Shah Sharqi was successful in conquering Chunar, but failed to capture Kalpi. He also conducted campaigns against Bengal and Odisha. The monarch of Odisha at that time was the legendary Kapilendra Deva Gajapati. The Odia forces defeated the Jaunpur Sultanate comprehensively. In 1452, he besieged Delhi but was defeated by Bahlul Lodi. Later, he made another attempt to conquer Delhi and marched into Etawah. Finally, he agreed to a treaty which accepted the right of Bahlul Lodi over Shamsabad. But when Bahlul tried to take possession of Shamsabad, he was opposed by the forces of Jaunpur. At this juncture, Mahmud Shah Sharqi died and he was succeeded by his son Bhikhan, who assumed the title of Muhammad Shah.

=== Muhammad Shah ===
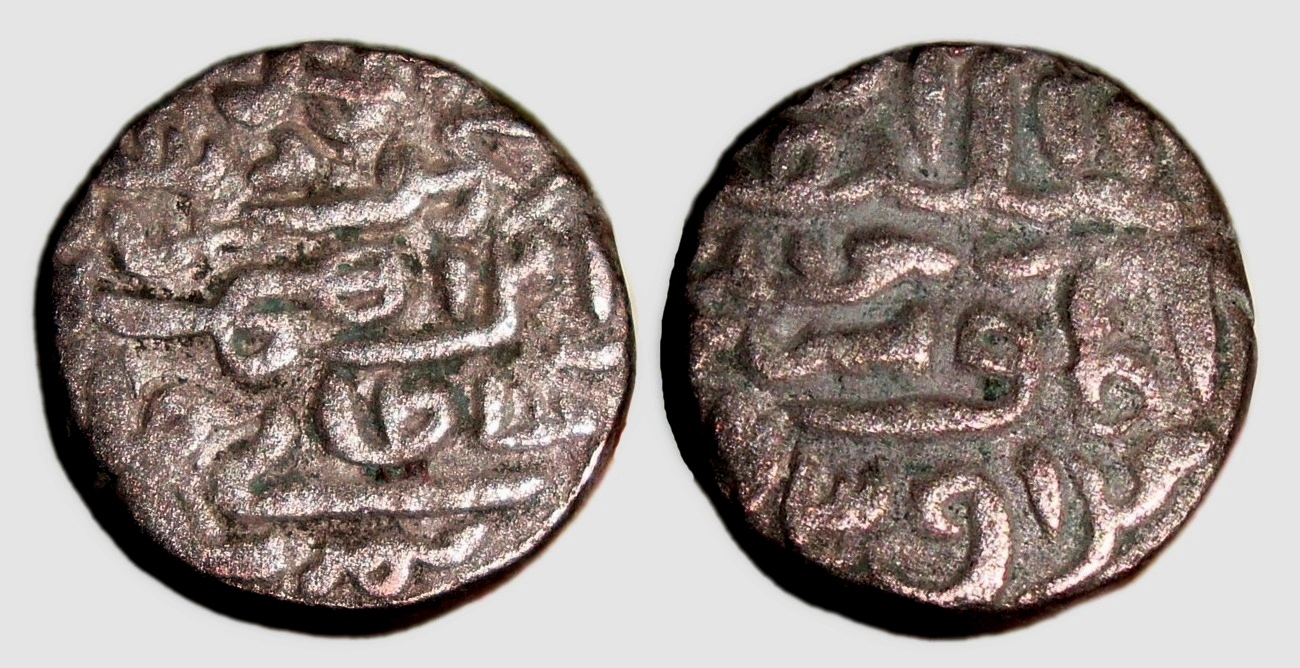
Billion tanka of Muhammad Shah

On assuming power in 1457, Muhammad Shah made peace with Bahlul Lodi and recognised his right over Shamsabad. He picked up a quarrel with his nobles. In 1458, after his brother Hasan was executed on his order, his other brother Hussain revolted and proclaimed himself as the sultan of Jaunpur, under the title of Hussain Shah. Muhammed Shah was soon killed by Hussain's army in Kanauj.

=== Hussain Shah ===
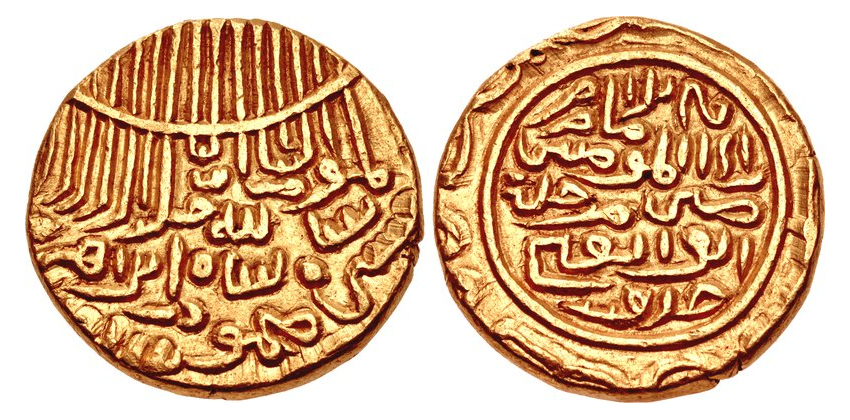
Coinage of Husain Shah, 1458–1479 CE

The last ruler, Hussain Shah, signed a four-year peace treaty with Bahlul Lodi in 1458. Later, in order to invade Delhi reached the banks of the Yamuna with a very large army in 1478. Sultan Bahlul Lodi tried to secure peace by offering to retain only Delhi and govern it as a vassal of Hussain Shah but he rejected the offer.

The flight of Sultan Hussain Sharki of Jaunpur, A.D. 1479

As a result, Sultan Bahlul crossed the Yamuna and defeated him. Hussain Shah agreed for truce but again captured Etawah and marched towards Delhi with a huge army and he was again defeated by Bahlul Lodi. He was able to make peace this time also. In March 1479, he again arrived at the banks of Yamuna. He was again defeated by Bahlul Lodi and lost the Parganas of Kampil, Patiali, Shamsabad, Suket, Koil, Marhara and Jalesar to the advancing army of the Delhi Sultan. After the successive defeats in the battles of Senha, Rapri and Raigaon Khaga, he was finally defeated on the banks of the Rahab, after which Bahlul Lodi appointed Mubarak Khan to Jaunpur. Hussain Shah re-assembled his forces, expelled Mubarak Khan and re-occupied Jaunpur, until Bahlul drove him out again. As a result of the Sharqi's being pushed back by Bahlul Lodi's advance, the last Sharqi-dated inscriptions in the region of Uttar Pradesh are from 1476 and 1479 in Kannauj and Jaunpur respectively while Sharqi inscriptions in Bihar continued until 1505.

He fled to Kahalgaon in modern-day Bihar, where he was granted asylum by sultan Alauddin Husain Shah and spent his last days there. In 1486, Bahlul Lodi placed his eldest surviving son Barbak Shah Lodi on the throne of Jaunpur. It was during Hussain Shah' rule that a claimant to be the mahdi of all Muslims, Muhammad Jaunpuri, appeared and Hussain Shah was an admirer of him.

== Military ==
Over the course of the fourteenth century, the Jaunpur Sultanate appeared to have been numerically superior to its neighbours when it came number of troops. It has been posited that this was because Jaunpur had many Rajput vassals under the sultans who paid tribute with levies of peasant war-bands. Among the contemporary Rajput clans who were situated in the territory or the peripheries of the Jaunpur Sultans, were the Baghelas of Rewa, the Bachgotis of Sultanpur in Uttar Pardesh, Ujjainiyas of Bhojpur as well as the Tomars of Gwalior.

The support of these Rajput levies were what allowed the last sultan, Hussain Shah, to continue to challenge the sultans of Delhi. One contemporary source, which may have exaggerated, advises of Juga, the chief of the Bachgoti clan of Rajputs, who is said to have assembled a huge band of army consisting of 200,000 infantry and 15,000 cavalry to support the Sultan.

== Arts and architecture ==
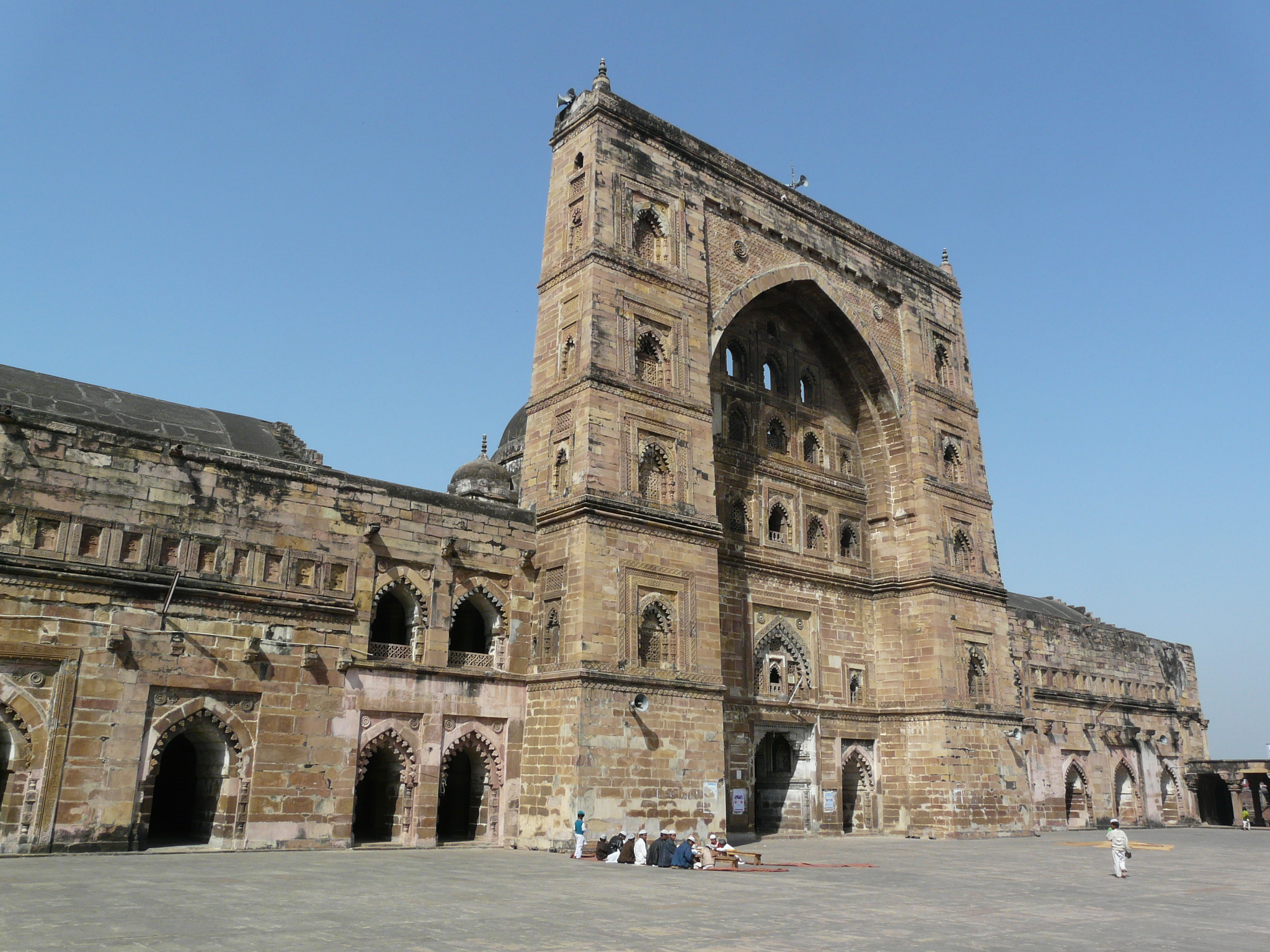
Main arcade facade, Jama Masjid

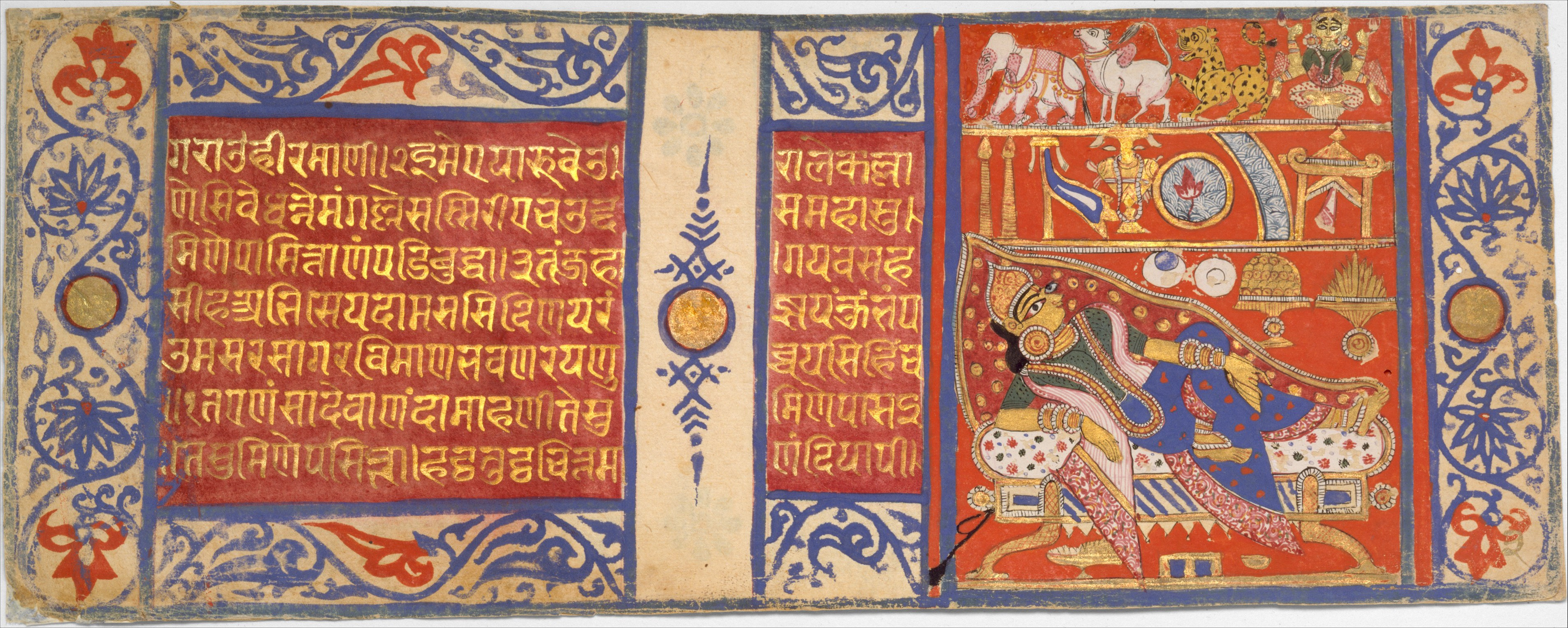
Devananda's Fourteen Auspicious Dreams Foretelling the Birth of Mahavira. Folio from a Kalpasutra Manuscript, Master of the Jaunpur Kalpasutra, ca. 1465 during the rule of Husain Shah. Jaunpur Sultanate, India.

The Sharqi rulers of Jaunpur were known for their patronage of learning and architecture. Jaunpur was known as the Shiraz of India during this period. Most notable examples of Sharqi style of architecture in Jaunpur are the Atala Mosque, the Lal Darwaza Mosque and the Jama Mosque. Though the foundation of the Atala Masjid was laid by Firuz Shah Tughluq in 1376, it was completed only during the rule of Ibrahim Shah in 1408. Another mosque, the Jhanjhari Masjid was also built by Ibrahim Shah in 1430. The Lal Darwaja Masjid (1450) was built during the reign of the next ruler Mahmud Shah. The Jama Masjid was built in 1470, during the rule of the last ruler Hussain Shah.

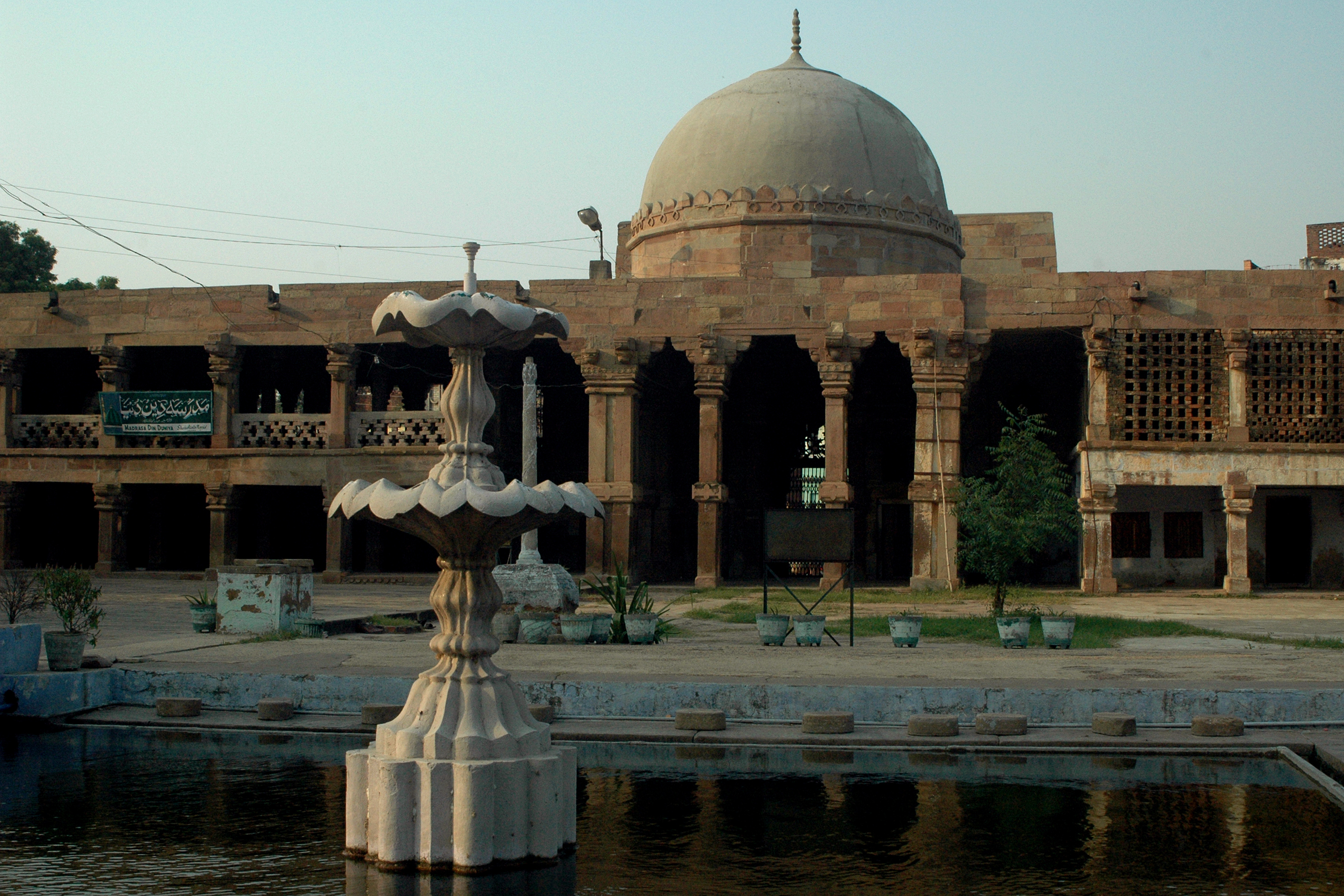
Atala Masjid

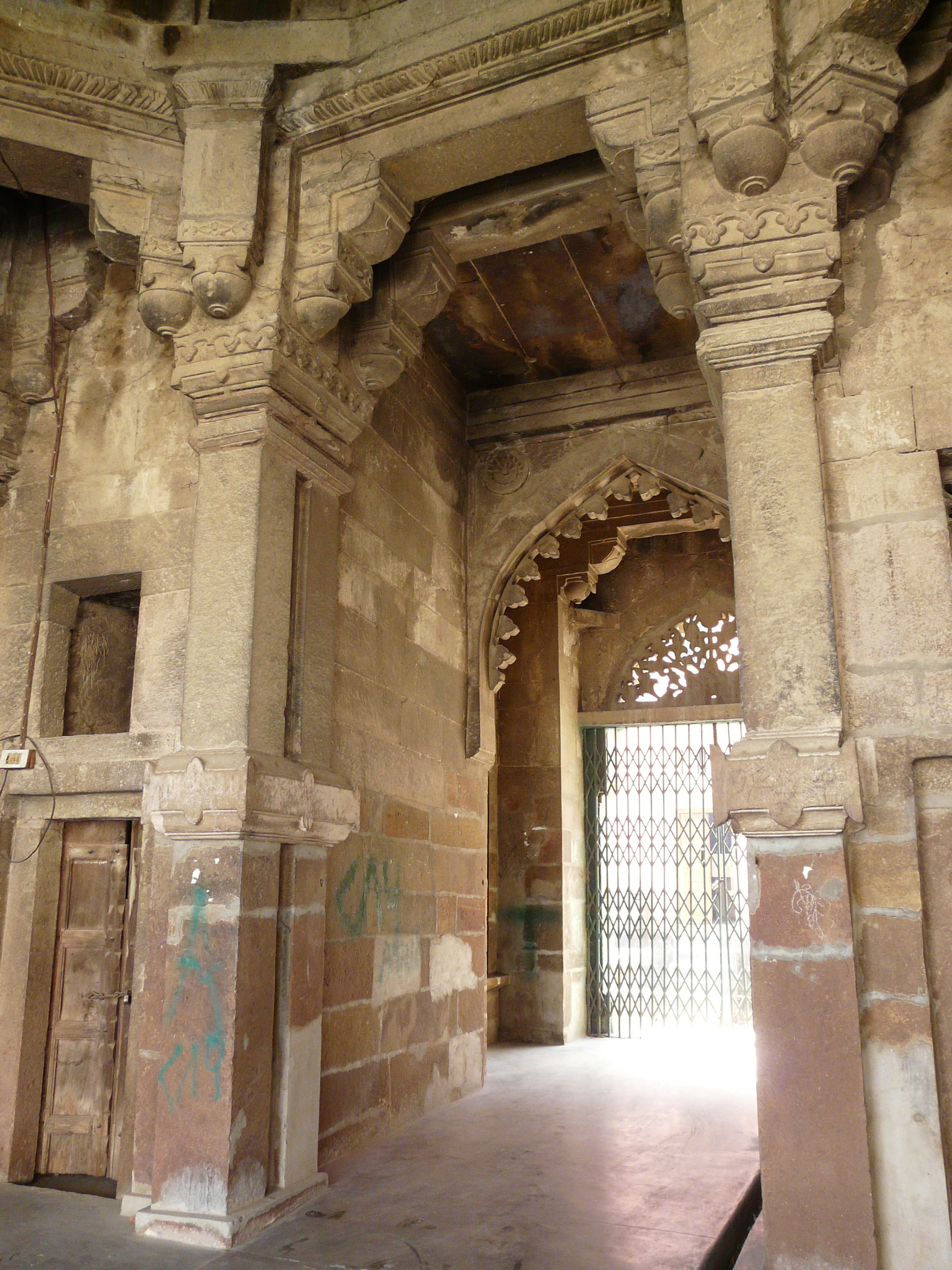
Entrance interior, Atala Masjid, Jaunpur

=== Music ===
The last ruler Hussain Shah assumed the title of Gandharva and contributed significantly in the development of khyal, a genre of Hindustani classical music. He also composed several new ragas (melodies). Most notable among these are Malhār-śyāma, Gaur-śyāma, Bhopāl-śyāma, Hussaini- or Jaunpurī-āśāvari (presently known as Jaunpuri) and Jaunpuri-basant.

== Coinage ==
The coin hoards of the Jaunpur Sultan's have mainly been found in the territory of the modern states of Uttar Pradesh and Bihar in India indicating the circulation of Sharqi coins in these regions.

The first two rulers of the Sultanate, Malik Sarwar and Mubarak Shah did not declare their independence from the Delhi Sultanate hence neither struck coins in their own name. Ibrahim Shah was the first of the sultans to issue his own coins when he came to rule in 1402. The known coins were issued in gold, silver and copper. On the obverse of the coins is written:

"Fi zaman al-Imam nai'b Amir al-mominin Abulfath khulidat Khilafatahu"

English translation: "In the time of the Imam, the Deputy of the Commander of the faithful, the father of victory, may the caliphate perpetuate".

His successors, Mahmud Shah and Hussain Shah also continued to mint coins in their own names with billon and copper.

== List of Sharqi rulers ==
Titular name	Personal name	Reign
Independence from Sultan of Delhi, Nasir ud din Muhammad Shah III
Khwajah-i-Jahan خواجہ جہاں; Malik-us-Sharq ملک الشرق; Atabeg-i-Azam اتابک اعظم	Malik Sarwar	1394–1399
Mubarak Shah مبارک شاہ	Malik Qaranfal	1399–1402
Shams-ud-Din Ibrahim Shah شمس الدین ابراہیم شاہ	Ibrahim Khan	1402–1440
Nasir-ud-Din Mahmud Shah ناصر الدین محمود شاہ	Mahmud Khan	1440–1457
Muhammad Shah محمد شاہ	Bhi Khan	1457–1458
Hussain Shah حسین شاہ	Husain Khan	1458–1479
Reabsorbed in Delhi Sultanate under Lodi Dynasty

== Family tree ==
Sharqi Dynasty

Malik Sarwar ?-1399; Sultan of Jaunpur; R.1394-1399
Unnamed
Mubarak Shah ?-1402; Sultan of Jaunpur; R.1399-1402	Ibrahim Shah ?-1440; Sultan of Jaunpur; R.1402-1440
Mahmud Shah ?-1457; Sultan of Jaunpur; R.1440-1457
Muhammad Shah ?-1458; Sultan of Jaunpur; R.1457-1458	Hussain Shah; Sultan of Jaunpur; R.1458-1479
