= Ibrahim Shah of Jaunpur =

Ruler of the Jaunpur Sultanate from 1401 to 1440

Ibrahim Shah
- Shams-ud-Din
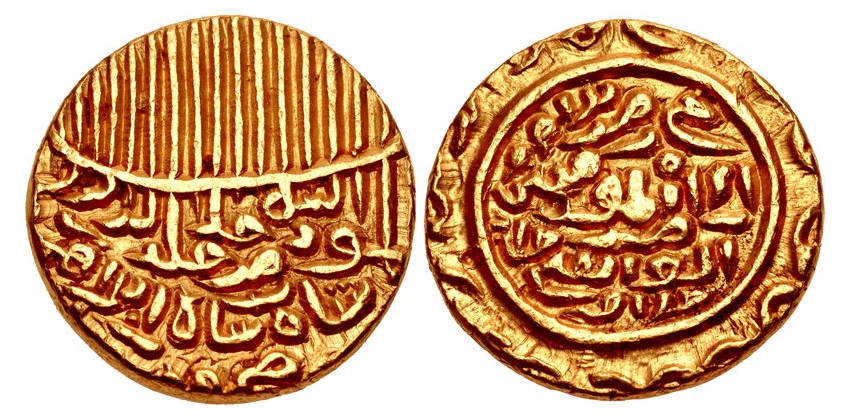

3rd Sultan of Jaunpur
- Reign: 1401 – 1440
- Predecessor: Mubarak Shah
- Successor: Mahmud Shah
- Issue: Mahmud Shah

Shams-ud-Din Ibrahim Shah Sharqi was the third sultan of the Jaunpur Sultanate, ruling from 1401 until his death in 1440. (Note: Nizamuddin Ahmad chronicles his date of death as 1436. However, numismatic evidence points to 1440.(Saeed 1972, p. 61))

== Early life and background ==
Malik Sarwar, who established the Jaunpur Sultanate had adopted Mubarak and Ibrahim. Mubarak succeeded Malik Sarwar in 1399, adopting the title of Mubarak Shah. After the death of Mubarak Shah in 1401, his younger brother Ibrahim became the sultan, assuming the title of Shams-ud-Din Ibrahim Shah.

== Reign ==
=== Battle of Raipur 1402 A.D. ===
Malik Arslan, driven by ambition, initiated an attack in 1402 that led to the death of Ganesvara and the seizure of Tirhut. Following this, Kirti Singh, Ganesvara's successor, endeavored to reclaim his throne and sought assistance from various regions, including Delhi and Bengal. After facing disappointment, Kirti Singh eventually turned to Ibrahim Shah Sharqi for support. Ibrahim Shah Sharqi promptly dispatched a significant military contingent under the leadership of his general, Malik Muhammad Ghani, alongside Qazi Khwaja Makhdum and Manuhar Raja. The Sharqi army swiftly crossed the Gandak River through rapid marches, prompting Malik Arslan to confront them. The pivotal battle ensued on the field of Raipur, culminating in the defeat and demise of Arsalan.

=== Conquest of Kannauj 1406-7 A.D. ===
Following the death of Mallu Iqbal Khan in November 1405, Sultan Mahmud was called to Delhi by the maliks and left Kanauj under the charge of Malik Mahmud Tarmati. Sultan Ibrahim, who had not accepted the loss of Kanauj, saw an opportunity to reclaim it. In October-November 1406, he marched against Kanauj as Sultan Mahmud moved to defend it from Delhi.

The two armies set up camp on opposite sides of the Ganges and eventually retreated without any significant gain. However, Ibrahim's retreat was a strategic ruse. Once Mahmud returned to Delhi and his iqtadars went back to their territories, Ibrahim quickly headed to Kanauj and laid siege to the fort. After enduring a four-month siege, Malik Mahmud Tarmati surrendered and Ibrahim appointed Ikhtiyar Khan as governor.

Ibrahim's successful conquest of Kanauj boosted his reputation and spurred him to pursue greater conquests. In October 1407, he led an expedition towards Delhi, with some nobles of Sultan Mahmud defecting to his side. The cities of Sambhal and Baran were taken en route and allotted to Tatar Khan and Malik Marhaba. However, upon hearing of Muzaffar Shah I of Gujarat's advance towards Jaunpur, Ibrahim swiftly retreated back to Jaunpur.

Sultan Mahmud seized the opportunity to reclaim Sambhal and Baran, with Malik Marhaba tragically taking his own life and Tatar Khan fleeing to Kanauj.

=== Rebellion of Shiv Singh 1414 A.D. ===
While en route to Bengal, the Sultan encountered resistance from Shiv Singh of Tirhut. Shiv Singh had ascended to the throne of Tirhut following the death of the childless Kirti Singh. Under the influence of Raja Ganesha, Shiv Singh was known for oppressing the Muslim population in Tirhut. In response, Sultan Ibrahim's forces launched an attack that resulted in the defeat of Raja Ganesha, forcing him to flee. Pursued by the Sharqi forces, Raja Ganesh was eventually apprehended. Additionally, his stronghold, Lahra, was captured by the advancing forces.

=== Bengal Campaign 1415 A.D. ===
In 1415 A.D.,Ibrahim Shah was called upon by the saint Qutb-ul-Alam to launch a campaign in Bengal, where the Hindu chieftain Ganesh had oppressed the Muslims. With the saint's blessing, Ibrahim led his forces to Bengal and defeated Raja Ganesha. A son of Ganesh, named Jadu, converted to Islam and took the throne with the support of Qutb-ul-Alam. Instead of annexing Bengal, Ibrahim Shah heeded the saint's advice and retired to Jaunpur.

During his rule, Ibrahim Shah transformed Jaunpur into a hub of art and culture, earning it the title of "The Shiraz of the East." He supported renowned scholars and artists, beautified the city with impressive buildings, and constructed the Atala Masjid in the distinctive Jaunpur architectural style. He upheld Islamic law and theology in his kingdom, overseeing the publication of numerous scholarly works.

Ibrahim Shah's reign of thirty-eight years is often considered the golden era of Jaunpur by historians. He is remembered as a skilled warrior, a benevolent ruler, and a patron of the arts and intellect.

=== Ujjain Expendition 1416 A.D. ===
Subsequently, Sultan Ibrahim directed his focus toward Ujjain. In this region, Maharaja Har Raj had been defeated and killed, while Kumar Gaj Raj and Deva Raj had been forced to flee by Sultan-ush-Sharq back in 1394. The defeated people of Ujjain continued to engage in guerrilla warfare from the hills and jungles. Following the death of Sultan-ush-Sharq, Gaj Raj had reclaimed Karoor. In 1416, the rebellious actions of Jag Deo, Gaj Raj's younger brother, prompted the Sharqi Sultan to launch a campaign against Ujjain once again. Sultan Ibrahim's forces seized control of Karoor and ousted both Gaj Raj and his brother, forcing them to retreat into the wilderness. Their successor, Sangram Dev, persisted in irregular warfare until the demise of Sultan Ibrahim, yet failed to gain the upper hand in the conflict.

=== Peace ===
After the events of Ujjain, Ibrahim enjoyed about ten years of peace. During this period, art and architecture flourished, and many scholars from different parts of India, as well as Iran, immigrated to Jaunpur. The Chahar Ungli Masjid and Jhanjhari Masjid were constructed during this period.

=== Mahmudabad ===
In 1433, Ibrahim Shah marched on to Mahmudabad and besieged the city for three months. Hushang Shah of Malwa, learning of this situation, also advanced towards Mahmudabad. Ibrahim raised the siege, crossed the Jamuna river, and encamped on the other side of the city. By this time, Hoshang had entered the city and place Jalal Khan on the throne. Ibrahim returned to Jaunpur.

Many Mahmudabadi nobles, unhappy with Jalal's rule, came to Jaunpur in order to seek Ibrahim's help. Ibrahim once again marched upon Mahmudabad and once again, Hushang Shah marched as well, and was joined by Jalal Khan. The armies of Jaunpur and Malwa fought an indecisive battle, with the Malwi losses being slightly higher. Hoshang Shah left in order to avoid a long war, leaving Jalal Khan within Mahmudabad, and Ibrahim laid siege. Jalal escaped to a nearby town, and Ibrahim occupied the city of Mahmudabad, enthroning Zaghir Khan. Zaghir later abdicated in favour of his brother, and Ibrahim finally placed Jalal on the throne.

=== Delhi ===
In 1437, taking advantage of the weak position of the Sultan of Delhi, Muhammad Shah, he annexed large parts of the Delhi Sultanate and besieged Delhi. Muhammad Shah sought for peace and offered a matrimonial alliance, and his daughter Bibi Raji was married to Ibrahim's son, Mahmud Khan.

== Bibliography ==
- Saeed, Mian Muhammad (1972). The Sharqi of Jaunpur: A Political & Cultural History. University of Karachi.
- Haig, Wolseley (1928). The Cambridge History of India. Vol. III. Cambridge University Press.
