= Usraon =

- Town
- Location in Uttar Pradesh, India Usraon (India)
- Coordinates: 25.35°N 82.40°E
- Country: India
- State: Uttar Pradesh
- District: Jaunpur

Government
  - Body: Nagar panchayat

Languages
  - Official: Hindi
- Time zone: UTC+5:30 (IST)

Usraon (Mariyahu) is a town and nagar panchayat in Jaunpur district in the Indian state of Uttar Pradesh. It is one of the six tahsils of Jaunpur District; the others are Jaunpur City, Shahganj, Machalishahar, Badlapur and Kerakat.

== Demographics ==
As of the 2001 India census, Mariahu has a population of 20,142; males constitute 53% of the population, and females 47%. In Mariahu, 17% of the population is under six years of age.

The major castes in the town are Rajput, Gaud, Rajbhar, and Yadav.

== Education ==
Usraon has a literacy rate of more than 65%, while Mariyahu has an average literacy rate of 59%, which is similar to the national average of 59.5%. Male literacy is 67%, and female literacy is 50%. Educational institutes in Mariyahu include the Mariahu P.G. College, Kaushilya Mahavidyalaya, and Shri Dawarika Shikshan Sansthan.

Mariahu P.G. College was founded in 1969 by Pt. Rajkishor Tiwari, who was a two-time Member of the Legislative Assembly (MLA) from the region. The college is affiliated to Veer Bahadur Purvanchal University, Jaunpur, and provides degrees including B.A., B.Sc., B.Com., B.Ed., B.T.C. B.Lib.I.Sc., M.A., PhD, and career-oriented programmes.

== Transportation ==
=== Rail ===
The nearest railway station is Mariahu, which is connected with most of the major cities of India through the Indian Railways network. It has a small railway station which belongs to Northern Railway; the station code is MAY. Four express trains stop at this station, and the major railway stations along the route are Jaunpur and Janghai Junction.

=== Road ===
The distance from Mariahu to the district headquarters, Jaunpur, is 18 km. Jaunpur is well connected to Lucknow, Varanasi, Allahabad and other cities of Uttar Pradesh.

=== Air ===
The nearest airport to Usraon is Babatpur (Varanasi) Airport, located at a distance of 35 km.

== Politics ==
Shraddha Yadav of Samajwadi Party (SP) is the sitting MLA of Mariahu constituency. Shraddha defeated her immediate rival Savitri Singh of Bahujan Samaj Party (BSP) by a margin of 12,477 in the 2012 Assembly election. Shraddha got 55,745 votes compared to Savitri's 43,268. In the 2007 election this seat was won by the BSP.

== Nearby villages ==
Usraon is situated near the villages of Madaiyaa, Purva, Tekardih, Duhavar, and Gorahi Mahadev.

== Village deities ==
The village deities are Mahamaidai, Chaura mai, Dih baba, and Pahlwan baba. A small temple of the Hindu God Mahadev is the main place of worship in the village.

== Festivals ==
The biggest celebrations in Usraon are Durga Pooja and Bharat Milap. The annual festivals of Diwali, Holi, Khichadi, and Raksha Bandhan are also celebrated in the village.
