= Mungra Badshahpur Assembly constituency =

Constituency of the Uttar Pradesh legislative assembly in India

Coordinates: 25.66°N 82.19°E

Mungra Badshahpur
- Constituency No. 368 for the Uttar Pradesh Legislative Assembly

Constituency details
- Country: India
- Region: North India
- State: Uttar Pradesh
- District: Jaunpur
- Total electors: 3,86,422
- Reservation: None

Member of Legislative Assembly
- 18th Uttar Pradesh Legislative Assembly
- Incumbent Pankaj Patel
- Party: Samajwadi Party
- Elected year: 2022

Mungra Badshahpur is a constituency of the Uttar Pradesh Legislative Assembly covering the town of Mungra Badshahpur and some other parts of Machhlishahr tehsil, in Jaunpur district of Uttar Pradesh, India. Mungra Badshahpur is one of five assembly constituencies in the Jaunpur Lok Sabha constituency.

== Members of Legislative Assembly ==
Election	Name	Party
Till 2012 : Constituency did not exist
2012	Seema Dwivedi	Bharatiya Janata Party
2017	Sushma Patel	Bahujan Samaj Party
2022	Pankaj Patel	Samajwadi Party

== Election results ==
=== 2027 ===
2027 Uttar Pradesh Legislative Assembly election: Mungra Badshapur
Party	Candidate	Votes	%	±%
INDIA				
NDA				
BSP	Vinod Mishra			
NOTA	None of the above			
Majority				
Turnout				
gain from		Swing		

=== 2022 ===
2022 Uttar Pradesh Legislative Assembly election: Mungra Badshahpur
Party	Candidate	Votes	%	±%
SP	Pankaj Patel (politician)	92,048	41.9	
BJP	Ajay Dubey	86,818	39.52	+8.38
BSP	Dinesh Kumar Shukla	32,597	14.84	−19.2
NOTA	None of the above	1,267	0.58	−0.53
Majority		5,230	2.38	−0.52
Turnout		219,700	56.85	−0.87
SP gain from BSP		Swing		

=== 2017 ===
Bahujan Samaj Party candidate Sushma Patel won in 2017 Uttar Pradesh Legislative Elections by defeating Bharatiya Janta Party candidate Seema Dwivedi by a margin of 5,920 votes.

2017 Uttar Pradesh Legislative Assembly Election: Mungra Badshahpu
Party	Candidate	Votes	%	±%
BSP	Sushma Patel	69,557	34.04	
BJP	Seema Dwivedi	63,637	31.14	
INC	Ajay Shankar Dubey	59,288	29.02	
CPI	Subhas Chandra	2,429	1.19	
NOTA	None of the above	2,240	1.11	
Majority		5,920	2.9	
Turnout		204,332	57.72	
