= Mariahu =

Mariahu Mariyahu
- Subdivision (Tehsil)
- Location in Uttar Pradesh, India Mariahu (India)
- Coordinates: 25.62°N 82.62°E
- Country: India
- State: Uttar Pradesh
- District: Jaunpur

Government
  - Type: Elected
  - Body: Nagar panchayat

Area
  - Total: 4.43 km^{2} (1.71 sq mi)
- Elevation: 87 m (285 ft)

Population (2011)
  - Total: 22,778

Language
  - Official: Hindi
  - other: Awadhi
- Time zone: UTC+5:30 (IST)
- Postal code: 222161
- Vehicle registration: UP-62
- Website: up.gov.in

Mariahu (Mariyahu) is a town and a nagar panchayat in Jaunpur district in the Indian state of Uttar Pradesh. Its name Mariahu was given by the leader of Nanwag (Nandwak) Rajputs, King Naun Rao in 16th century on the name of Mandav Deo, the patreon deity of the Nanwag clan. The samadhi of Mandav dev is situated near to Chutka Devi temple which is in the east of tehsil. Mostly tehsil was ruled by Nanwag Rajputs who were the local rulers during 16th and 17th century. Baghi Sangram Singh, a leader of the Nanwags, revolted against the British East India company during the Rebellion of 1857 and defeated them on several occasions. It is one of the six tehsils of Jaunpur district, with the others being Jaunpur city, Shahganj, Machalishahar, Badlapur and Kerakat.

== Geography ==
Mariahu has an average elevation of 87 metres (285 ft).

== Demographics ==
As of 2011 Indian Census, Mariahu had a total population of 22,778, of which 11,661 were males and 11,117 were females. Population within the age group of 0 to 6 years was 3,331. The total number of literates in Mariahu was 15,426, which constituted 67.7% of the population with male literacy of 73.5% and female literacy of 61.7%. The effective literacy rate of 7+ population of Mariahu was 79.3%, of which male literacy rate was 86.2% and female literacy rate was 72.1%. The Scheduled Castes and Scheduled Tribes population was 3,364 and 1 respectively. Mariahu had 3248 households in 2011.

As of the 2001 Census of India, Mariahu had a population of 20,142. Males constitute 53% of the population and females 47%. In Mariahu, 17% of the population is under 6 years of age.

== Transportation ==
=== Rail ===
Mariahu is connected with major cities of India through Indian Railways network. Railway station and track were constructed by the British in 1905 AD. It has a Small Railway station Mariahu Railway Station which belongs to Northern Railway zone. Station Code is (MAY). There are a total of four Mail/Express Train stops at this station. Nearby major railway stations are Jaunpur Junction and Janghai Junction. There is local passenger Prayagraj - Jaunpur Passenger which halts at Mariahu Railway Station to and from Jaunpur to Prayagraj and Prayagraj to Jaunpur.

The Train Godan Express, Chappra Express departing from Mumbai stops at this station. This train is very famous among local people who travel to and from Mumbai.

=== Road ===
Driving distance from Mariahu to District headquarters Jaunpur is 18 km. Jaunpur is well connected to Lucknow, Varanasi, Prayagraj and other cities of Uttar Pradesh. Quick road transport is available for Jaunpur, Bhadohi, Mirzapur.

=== Air ===
The nearest airport to Mariahu is Lal Bahadur Shashtri International Airport (Varanasi). Road Distance or driving distance from Mariahu to Babatpur is 35 km. Your total travel time is approximately 44 min, which may vary depending upon the road and traffic conditions. The Airport is well connected and has direct flight to major cities of India like New Delhi, Mumbai, Kolkata, Chennai, Bangalore, Hyderabad, Patna and many others to join.

Plans to construct an airport in Mariahu were cancelled in 2018.

== Festivals ==
The biggest celebrations in Mariahu are Diwali, Durga Pooja & Bharat Milap as a yearly festival. People also organize big celebrations on Eid-ul-Fitr, Holi, Ramzan-ul-Mubarak, Raksha Bandhan and many other occasions.

== Notable people ==
- Dinesh Kunwar Patel, Developer of world's first homemade humanoid Robot "Shalu" that can speak 47 languages (from Rajamalpur village in Mariahu
- Shyam Singh Yadav, 2019 Member of Parliament from Jaunpur Lok Sabha constituency (from Ranipatti village in Mariahu).
