= Seema Dwivedi =

Indian politician

Member of Parliament, Rajya Sabha
- In office 25 November 2020 – 25 November 2026
- Preceded by: Ravi Prakash Verma
- Constituency: Uttar Pradesh

Member of the Uttar Pradesh Legislative Assembly
- In office 2012–2017
- Succeeded by: Sushma Patel
- Constituency: Mungra Badshahpur
- In office 2007–2012
- Constituency: Garwara
- In office 1997–2002
- Constituency: Garwara

Personal details
- Born: 11 March 1970 (age 56) Bhoila, Uttar Pradesh, India
- Party: Bharatiya Janata Party
- Spouse: Dr. Arun Kumar Dwivedi (m. 1991)
- Children: 1 son
- Education: M.A.
- Alma mater: Veer Bahadur Singh Purvanchal University

Seema Dwivedi is an Indian politician and Member of Parliament in the Rajya Sabha from Uttar Pradesh. She is a former member of the Uttar Pradesh Legislative Assembly from the Mungra Badshahpur constituency in Jaunpur district. She is a member of the Bharatiya Janata Party
