= Gairwah =

Gairwah is a village of multiple sub village's (Purwa) [Shahapur, Badakapura, Hatiya, Dadwa, Hannawal, Paschim ka purwa, Rakba, Manpur, Najaunpur, Sonwa, Harnawal] in Jaunpur district of Uttar Pradesh, India. The Gairwah is in a rural part of Uttar Pradesh, India. The Gairwah extends from north east India Uttar Pradesh at the border of Sultanpur. According to Census 2011 information the location code or village code of Gairwah village is 200097. Gairwah village is located in Shahganj tehsil of Jaunpur district of Uttar Pradesh, India

== Gairwah village overview ==
Gram Panchayat: Gairwah	Tehsil: Shahganj	Block: Suitha Kala	District: Jaunpur	State: Uttar Pradesh	Pincode: 223103	Area: 1154.11 hectares	Population: 9000	Households: 1,321
