= Ranno =

Village in India

- Village
- Location in Uttar Pradesh, India Ranno (India)
- Coordinates: 25.7464°N 82.6837°E
- Country: India
- State: Uttar Pradesh
- District: Jaunpur

Area
  - Total: 5.3538 km^{2} (2.0671 sq mi)

Population (2011)
  - Total: 7,996
  - Density: 1,494/km^{2} (3,868/sq mi)
- Demonym: Rannavi

Language
  - Official: Hindi
  - Additional official: Urdu
- Time zone: UTC+5:30 (IST)

Ranno is a village in Jaunpur district in the Indian state of Uttar Pradesh. Ranno is located in the Purwanchal region, between Jaunpur and Badlapur.

It has seven sub villages including Dakhin Patti, Uttar patti, Barre Patti, Sadaruddin pur, Pura Sherkhan, Mohammad Pur and mahiman pur, with a combined population of nearly 8000. There are significant Muslim and Hindu populations in the region, with Muslims being the majority, but there is no conflict between these groups. Ranno has a good literacy rate, but overall state of education needs improvement. There are many engineers, doctors and government employees.

Sub-villages
(1) Dakhin Patti
(2) Uttar Patti
(3) Barre Patti
(4) Sadruddin Pur
(5) Pura Sher khan
(6) Mohammad Pur
(7) Mahiman Pur

== Ranno Amari ==
Ranno Amari is a major event conducted by the residents, which attracts a big crowd from all around India. It is an event carried out to mourn for the 72 martyrs of Karbala, Iraq. It is one of the largest peaceful gatherings in India. A 118-foot tall flag (Alam) is hoisted every year for this event.

Upcoming predicted dates of Ranno Amari
1443	9 October 2021
1444	28 September 2022
1445	17 September 2023
1446	6 September 2024
1447	26 August 2025
1448	15 August 2026

== Schools ==
- Urdu Prathamic Vidyalaya
- Seth Ali Ahmad Orientel College
- K F public school
- M S D convent

== Historic places and sights ==
- Sadar Imam Bargah Ranno
- Roza-E-Rasul-E-Khuda
- Roza Bibi Fatima Zahra
- Roza Imam Hussain
- Roza Maula Abbas
- Makhdum Shah Baba Mazar
