= Hardasipur =

Village in Uttar Pradesh, India

Hardasipur is a village in Jaunpur district, Uttar Pradesh, India.

The village is located 35 km north from Varanasi. The very old and famous Maa Kali Temple is located in this village. This village is under Chandwak Thana Kerakat tehsil. Its postcode is 222129
