= Sarasara, Uttar Pradesh =

Sarasara
- Village
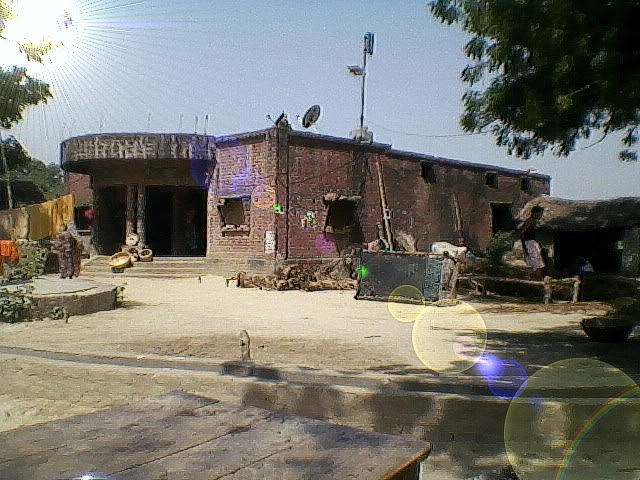
- House in Sarasara

- Location in Uttar Pradesh, India
- Coordinates: 25.80°N 82.41°E
- Country: India
- State: Uttar Pradesh
- District: Jaunpur District
- Tehsil: Badlapur
- Elevation: 82 m (269 ft)

Population (2011)
  - Total: 841

Languages
  - Official: Hindi
- Time zone: UTC+5:30 (IST)
- PIN: 222141

Sarasara is a village in Badlapur, Jaunpur district, Uttar Pradesh, India.

== Geography ==
Sarasara is located at 25.80°N 82.41°E.

It has an average elevation of 82 metres. It has been assigned 222141 pincode by Indian postal services.

== Demographics ==
As of the 2011 Indian census, Sarsara had a population of 841.
