= Panchrukhava =

Panchrukhava is a village in Shahganj, Jaunpur district, Uttar Pradesh, India.
