= Trikauli =

Village in Jaunpur, Uttar Pradesh

Trikauli is a village in Shahganj, Jaunpur district, Uttar Pradesh, India.
