= Demographics of Uttar Pradesh =

The demographics of Uttar Pradesh is a complex topic, which is undergoing dynamic change. Uttar Pradesh is India's most populous state, and the largest subdivision in the world. It has a population of about 199,812,341 as per the 2011 census. If it were a separate country, Uttar Pradesh would be the world's fifth most populous nation, next only to China, the rest of India, the United States of America and Indonesia. Uttar Pradesh has a population more than that of Pakistan. There is an average population density of 828 persons per km^{2} i.e. 2,146 per sq mi. The capital of Uttar Pradesh is Lucknow, and Prayagraj serves as the state’s judicial capital. Hindus and Muslims both consider the state as a holy place.

The peripheral regions of Uttar Pradesh, are home to a number of tribal communities such as Agaria, Baiga, Bhar, Bhoksa, Bind, Chero, Gond, Kol and Korwa. Five of these tribal communities have been recognised by the Government of India as disadvantaged scheduled tribes, viz. Tharus, Boksas, Bhotias, Jaunswaris and Rajis. The literacy rate of the state according to the 2011 Census is 70.69%. With the literacy rate for Males at 79.20%, while it is 59.30% for the Females. While this is still below the national average of 74.04% (82.14% for men, 65.16% for women) the rate of growth has been much higher in Uttar Pradesh as compared to the rest of India.

== District ==
As of the 2011 census, Prayagraj is the most populous district of Uttar Pradesh while Mahoba being the least populated. Only 3 districts of Jaunpur, Azamgarh and Deoria have a sex ratio greater than 1000 while Gautam Buddha Nagar stands lowest in the tally with a very low ratio of 851. On the contrary, Gautam Buddha Nagar scores highest in literacy rate at 80.12% and Kanpur Nagar 2nd at 79.54%, while both being the poorest districts in terms of sex-ratio, depicting a negative-correlation among literacy and sex-ratio in this case. The districts of Srawasti, Bahraich and Balrampur have yet to cross the 50% literacy mark.

The following table enumerates population, sex-ratio and literacy rates for each district of Uttar Pradesh:

District-wise demographics of Uttar Pradesh (2011 Census)
District	Population			Sex ratio	Literacy		
District	Total	Male	Female	Sex ratio	Total	Male	Female
Gautam Buddha Nagar	1648115	890214	757901	851	0.8012	0.8806	0.7082
Kanpur Nagar	4581268	2459806	2121462	862	0.7965	0.8362	0.7505
Auraiya	1379545	740040	639505	864	0.7895	0.8611	0.7061
Etawah	1581810	845856	735954	870	0.7841	0.8606	0.6961
Ghaziabad	4681645	2488834	2192811	881	0.7807	0.8542	0.6979
Lucknow	4589838	2394476	2195362	917	0.7729	0.8256	0.7154
Mainpuri	1868529	993377	875152	881	0.7599	0.8453	0.663
Kanpur Dehat	1796184	963255	832929	865	0.7578	0.8345	0.6686
Varanasi	3676841	1921857	1754984	913	0.756	0.8378	0.6669
Jhansi	1998603	1057436	941167	890	0.7505	0.8538	0.6349
Jaunpur	4494204	2220465	2273739	1024	0.74	0.838	0.5981
Jalaun	1689974	906092	783882	865	0.7375	0.8348	0.6246
Mau	2205968	1114709	1091259	979	0.7309	0.8245	0.6363
Meerut	3443689	1825743	1617946	886	0.7284	0.8074	0.6398
Kannauj	1656616	881776	774840	879	0.727	0.8091	0.6333
Prayagraj	5954391	3131807	2822584	901	0.7232	0.8255	0.6099
Ambedkar Nagar	2397888	1212410	1185478	978	0.7223	0.8166	0.6266
Baghpat	1303048	700070	602978	861	0.7201	0.8245	0.5995
Firozabad	2498156	1332046	1166110	875	0.7192	0.8082	0.6175
Ghazipur	3620268	1855075	1765193	952	0.7178	0.828	0.6029
Mahamaya Nagar (Hathras)	1564708	836127	728581	871	0.7159	0.8238	0.5923
Agra	4418797	2364953	2053844	868	0.7158	0.8062	0.6118
Chandauli	1952756	1017905	934851	918	0.7148	0.8172	0.6035
Deoria	3100946	1537436	1563510	1017	0.7113	0.8327	0.5938
Ballia	3239774	1672902	1566872	937	0.7094	0.8149	0.5975
Azamgarh	4613913	2285004	2328909	1019	0.7093	0.8134	0.6091
Gorakhpur	4440895	2277777	2163118	950	0.7083	0.818	0.5936
Etah	1774480	947339	827141	873	0.7081	0.8128	0.588
Saharanpur	3466382	1834106	1632276	890	0.7049	0.7828	0.6174
Mathura	2547184	1367125	1180059	863	0.7036	0.8197	0.5689
Pratapgarh	3209141	1606085	1603056	998	0.7009	0.8188	0.5845
Sultanpur	3797117	1914586	1882531	983	0.6927	0.8019	0.5828
Muzaffarnagar	4143512	2193434	1950078	889	0.6912	0.7844	0.5869
Farrukhabad	1885204	1006240	878964	874	0.6904	0.774	0.5944
Sant Ravidas Nagar (Bhadohi)	1578213	807099	771114	955	0.6897	0.8147	0.5603
Bulandshahr	3499171	1845260	1653911	896	0.6888	0.8093	0.5557
Hamirpur	1104285	593537	510748	861	0.6877	0.7976	0.5595
Faizabad	2470996	1259628	1211368	962	0.6873	0.7812	0.5903
Mirzapur	2496970	1312302	1184668	903	0.6848	0.7897	0.5686
Bijnor	3682713	1921215	1761498	917	0.6848	0.7656	0.5972
Aligarh	3673889	1951996	1721893	882	0.6751	0.7797	0.5568
Fatehpur	2632733	1384722	1248011	901	0.6743	0.7719	0.5658
Rae Bareli	3405559	1752542	1653017	943	0.6725	0.7763	0.5629
Basti	2464464	1255272	1209192	963	0.6722	0.7788	0.5623
Sant Kabir Nagar	1715183	869656	845527	972	0.6672	0.7839	0.548
Banda	1799410	965876	833534	863	0.6667	0.7778	0.5367
Unnao	3108367	1630087	1478280	907	0.6637	0.7505	0.5676
Mahoba	875958	466358	409600	878	0.6527	0.7583	0.5322
Kushinagar	3564544	1818055	1746489	961	0.6525	0.7771	0.5236
Chitrakoot	991730	527721	464009	879	0.6505	0.758	0.5274
Hardoi	4092845	2191442	1901403	868	0.6457	0.7439	0.5319
Sonbhadra	1862559	971344	891215	918	0.6403	0.7492	0.5214
Jyotiba Phule Nagar (Amroha)	1840221	963449	876772	910	0.6384	0.7454	0.521
Lalitpur	1221592	641011	580581	906	0.6352	0.7498	0.5084
Mahrajganj	2684703	1381754	1302949	943	0.6276	0.7585	0.4892
Bara Banki	3260699	1707073	1553626	910	0.6175	0.7027	0.5234
Pilibhit	2031007	1072002	959005	895	0.6147	0.717	0.5
Kaushambi	1599596	838485	761111	908	0.6128	0.7278	0.4856
Sitapur	4483992	2375264	2108728	888	0.6112	0.7031	0.5067
Kanshiram Nagar (Kasganj)	1436719	764165	672554	880	0.6102	0.7156	0.49
Kheri	4021243	2123187	1898056	894	0.6056	0.6957	0.5042
Shahjahanpur	3006538	1606403	1400135	872	0.5954	0.6818	0.4957
Siddharthnagar	2559297	1295095	1264202	976	0.5925	0.7092	0.4741
Gonda	3433919	1787146	1646773	921	0.5871	0.6941	0.4709
Bareilly	4448359	2357665	2090694	887	0.5849	0.675	0.483
Moradabad	4772006	2503186	2268820	906	0.5677	0.6483	0.4786
Rampur	2335819	1223889	1111930	909	0.5334	0.614	0.4444
Budaun	3681896	1967759	1714137	871	0.5129	0.6098	0.4009
Balrampur	2148665	1114721	1033944	928	0.4951	0.5973	0.3843
Bahraich	3487731	1843884	1643847	892	0.4936	0.5834	0.3918
Shrawasti	1117361	593897	523464	881	0.4674	0.5716	0.3478
Uttar Pradesh	199812341	104480510	95331831	912	0.6768	0.7728	0.5718

=== Rank of districts ===
Population Growth
Year	Pop.	±%
1951	60,274,000	—
1961	70,144,000	+16.4%
1971	83,849,000	+19.5%
1981	105,137,000	+25.4%
1991	132,062,000	+25.6%
2001	166,198,000	+25.8%
2011	199,581,477	+20.1%
2018	227,920,005	+14.2%
Source: Census of India

Following rankings are as per Population Census 2011.

By area

1. Lakhimpur Kheri - 8,780
2. Sonbhadra - 6,999
3. Hardoi - 5,986
4. Bahraich - 5,745
5. Sitapur - 5,743

By population

1. Allahabad - 5,954,391
2. Moradabad - 4,772,006
3. Ghaziabad - 4,681,645
4. Azamgarh - 4,613,913
5. Lucknow - 4,589,838
6. Kanpur Nagar - 4,581,268
7. Jaunpur - 4,494,204
8. Sitapur - 4,483,992
9. Bareilly - 4,448,359
10. Gorakhpur - 4,440,895

==== By population density ====
1. Ghaziabad - 1995
2. Varanasi - 1954
3. Lucknow - 1456
4. Sant Ravidas Nagar (Bhadohi) - 1409
5. Kanpur Nagar - 1369

==== By literacy ====
1. Gautam Budha Nagar(Noida) - 80.12%
2. Kanpur Nagar - 79.65%
3. Auraiya - 78.95%
4. Etawah - 78.41%
5. Ghaziabad - 78.07%

==== By sex ratio ====
1. Jaunpur - 1024
2. Azamgarh - 1018
3. Deoria - 1003
4. Mau - 984
5. Pratapgarh - 982
6. Ambedkar Nagar - 978
7. Faizabad - 972
8. Sultanpur - 965
9. Basti - 963
10. Sant Kabir Nagar - 960

== Religion ==
In Uttar Pradesh the religion-wise percentage of population is Hindus 79.7, Muslims 19.3, Sikhs 0.3, Christians 0.2, Jains 0.1, Buddhists 0.1 while 0.3 of people have other religion or didn't state one.

Religion in Uttar Pradesh
Religion	2001	2011
Hinduism	133,979,263	159,312,654
Islam	30,740,158	38,483,967
Sikhism	678,059	643,500
Christianity	212,578	356,448
Jainism	207,111	213,267
Buddhism	302,031	206,285
Other	9,281	13,598
Not stated	n/a	582,622
Total	166,197,921	199,812,341

Religion in Uttar Pradesh (%)
Religion	2001	2011
Hinduism	80.61	79.73
Islam	18.42	19.26
Sikhism	0.41	0.32
Christianity	0.13	0.18
Jainism	0.12	0.11
Buddhism	0.18	0.10
Other	>0.01	>0.01
Not stated	n/a	0.29

Religion-wise demographics of UP (2011 Census)
Religion	=== Population ===			=== Sex ratio ===	=== Literacy rate === (Note: For Literacy rate, population aged 7 and above only is considered in India.)		
Religion	Male	Female	Total	=== Sex ratio ===	Male	Female	Total
Hindu	83,555,724	75,756,930	159,312,654	907	79.73%	58.61%	69.68%
Muslim	19,867,314	18,616,653	38,483,967	937	66.42%	50.59%	58.76%
Christian	182,838	173,610	356,448	950	79.44%	67.54%	73.63%
Sikh	341,451	302,049	643,500	885	84.91%	73.15%	79.35%
Buddhist	107,424	98,861	206,285	920	79.19%	57.07%	68.59%
Jain	110,994	102,273	213,267	921	95.81%	92.16%	94.05%
Other religions and persuasions	7,070	6,528	13,598	923	80.18%	61.30%	71.11%
Religion not stated	307,695	274,927	582,622	894	78.37%	60.84%	70.01%
Uttar Pradesh	104,480,510	95,331,831	199,812,341	912	77.28%	57.18%	67.68%

=== District-wise religious population ===
Population count for each district (with percentages (Note: Percentages are calculated out of total population for respective district, depicting the share of a religion's population in that district.)) as per 2011 Census.

District-wise religious population
District	Buddhist		Christian		Hindu		Jain		Muslim		Sikh		Other religions		Religion not stated		District Population
District	Count	%	Count	%	Count	%	Count	%	Count	%	Count	%	Count	%	Count	%	District Population
Agra	4,049	0.09%	10,076	0.23%	3,922,718	88.77%	21,508	0.49%	411,313	9.31%	12,057	0.27%	384	0.01%	36,692	0.83%	4,418,797
Aligarh	2,582	0.07%	7,635	0.21%	2,904,140	79.05%	2,805	0.08%	729,283	19.85%	5,875	0.16%	91	0.00%	21,478	0.58%	3,673,889
Allahabad	4,391	0.07%	13,782	0.23%	5,102,041	85.69%	2,247	0.04%	796,756	13.38%	4,377	0.07%	305	0.01%	30,492	0.51%	5,954,391
Ambedkar Nagar	1,817	0.08%	2,536	0.11%	1,985,654	82.81%	235	0.01%	401,678	16.75%	869	0.04%	33	0.00%	5,066	0.21%	2,397,888
Auraiya	332	0.02%	1,004	0.07%	1,273,546	92.32%	228	0.02%	101,963	7.39%	371	0.03%	444	0.03%	1,657	0.12%	1,379,545
Azamgarh	5,652	0.12%	3,810	0.08%	3,878,626	84.06%	183	0.00%	718,692	15.58%	719	0.02%	226	0.00%	6,005	0.13%	4,613,913
Baghpat	161	0.01%	1,840	0.14%	917,474	70.41%	16,139	1.24%	364,583	27.98%	483	0.04%	25	0.00%	2,343	0.18%	1,303,048
Bahraich	2,793	0.08%	6,400	0.18%	2,291,892	65.71%	1,177	0.03%	1,169,330	33.53%	8,212	0.24%	38	0.00%	7,889	0.23%	3,487,731
Ballia	1,595	0.05%	4,463	0.14%	3,004,240	92.73%	233	0.01%	213,440	6.59%	892	0.03%	64	0.00%	14,847	0.46%	3,239,774
Balrampur	1,866	0.09%	3,228	0.15%	1,333,242	62.05%	198	0.01%	805,975	37.51%	900	0.04%	87	0.00%	3,169	0.15%	2,148,665
Banda	168	0.01%	1,367	0.08%	1,637,549	91.00%	916	0.05%	157,612	8.76%	231	0.01%	50	0.00%	1,517	0.08%	1,799,410
Bara Banki	1,553	0.05%	4,857	0.15%	2,505,444	76.84%	3,016	0.09%	737,106	22.61%	2,090	0.06%	211	0.01%	6,422	0.20%	3,260,699
Bareilly	4,371	0.10%	14,822	0.33%	2,830,768	63.64%	931	0.02%	1,536,534	34.54%	28,187	0.63%	339	0.01%	32,407	0.73%	4,448,359
Basti	9,753	0.40%	3,493	0.14%	2,082,976	84.52%	107	0.00%	364,510	14.79%	900	0.04%	99	0.00%	2,626	0.11%	2,464,464
Bijnor	1,736	0.05%	6,184	0.17%	2,032,081	55.18%	2,134	0.06%	1,585,210	43.04%	50,624	1.37%	41	0.00%	4,703	0.13%	3,682,713
Budaun	1,959	0.05%	6,320	0.17%	2,867,707	77.89%	678	0.02%	790,515	21.47%	1,135	0.03%	87	0.00%	13,495	0.37%	3,681,896
Bulandshahr	669	0.02%	4,088	0.12%	2,707,195	77.37%	1,572	0.04%	777,407	22.22%	2,765	0.08%	86	0.00%	5,389	0.15%	3,499,171
Chandauli	340	0.02%	2,153	0.11%	1,727,869	88.48%	100	0.01%	215,081	11.01%	1,389	0.07%	1,175	0.06%	4,649	0.24%	1,952,756
Chitrakoot	101	0.01%	693	0.07%	955,372	96.33%	285	0.03%	34,559	3.48%	63	0.01%	27	0.00%	630	0.06%	991,730
Deoria	1,182	0.04%	3,626	0.12%	2,730,957	88.07%	209	0.01%	358,539	11.56%	818	0.03%	146	0.00%	5,469	0.18%	3,100,946
Etah	2,887	0.16%	2,464	0.14%	1,611,126	90.79%	5,671	0.32%	146,346	8.25%	708	0.04%	18	0.00%	5,260	0.30%	1,774,480
Etawah	1,733	0.11%	1,362	0.09%	1,457,892	92.17%	3,917	0.25%	113,961	7.20%	1,045	0.07%	94	0.01%	1,806	0.11%	1,581,810
Faizabad	737	0.03%	3,225	0.13%	2,094,271	84.75%	358	0.01%	365,806	14.80%	1,912	0.08%	185	0.01%	4,502	0.18%	2,470,996
Farrukhabad	3,161	0.17%	3,137	0.17%	1,596,278	84.67%	487	0.03%	276,846	14.69%	3,160	0.17%	100	0.01%	2,035	0.11%	1,885,204
Fatehpur	172	0.01%	2,201	0.08%	2,274,674	86.40%	199	0.01%	350,700	13.32%	402	0.02%	47	0.00%	4,338	0.16%	2,632,733
Firozabad	3,395	0.14%	3,370	0.13%	2,140,745	85.69%	19,077	0.76%	314,812	12.60%	1,804	0.07%	61	0.00%	14,892	0.60%	2,498,156
Gautam Buddha Nagar	895	0.05%	7,366	0.45%	1,394,025	84.58%	4,518	0.27%	215,500	13.08%	9,261	0.56%	91	0.01%	16,459	1.00%	1,648,115
Ghaziabad	3,487	0.07%	19,026	0.41%	3,414,427	72.93%	16,412	0.35%	1,186,776	25.35%	23,001	0.49%	265	0.01%	18,251	0.39%	4,681,645
Ghazipur	3,145	0.09%	4,181	0.12%	3,233,790	89.32%	213	0.01%	368,153	10.17%	810	0.02%	184	0.01%	9,792	0.27%	3,620,268
Gonda	649	0.02%	4,735	0.14%	2,739,076	79.77%	338	0.01%	678,615	19.76%	1,893	0.06%	57	0.00%	8,556	0.25%	3,433,919
Gorakhpur	2,848	0.06%	9,662	0.22%	4,009,037	90.28%	460	0.01%	403,847	9.09%	2,123	0.05%	207	0.00%	12,711	0.29%	4,440,895
Hamirpur	74	0.01%	814	0.07%	1,010,014	91.46%	41	0.00%	91,269	8.26%	196	0.02%	273	0.02%	1,604	0.15%	1,104,285
Hardoi	6,671	0.16%	5,822	0.14%	3,508,131	85.71%	446	0.01%	556,219	13.59%	5,688	0.14%	98	0.00%	9,770	0.24%	4,092,845
Jalaun	2,875	0.17%	1,148	0.07%	1,509,708	89.33%	256	0.02%	171,581	10.15%	463	0.03%	145	0.01%	3,798	0.22%	1,689,974
Jaunpur	7,898	0.18%	4,947	0.11%	3,981,502	88.59%	349	0.01%	483,750	10.76%	1,286	0.03%	114	0.00%	14,358	0.32%	4,494,204
Jhansi	1,203	0.06%	7,050	0.35%	1,823,930	91.26%	7,328	0.37%	147,842	7.40%	4,951	0.25%	311	0.02%	5,988	0.30%	1,998,603
Jyotiba Phule Nagar	189	0.01%	5,952	0.32%	1,075,440	58.44%	517	0.03%	750,368	40.78%	5,295	0.29%	21	0.00%	2,439	0.13%	1,840,221
Kannauj	2,033	0.12%	1,263	0.08%	1,375,788	83.05%	606	0.04%	273,967	16.54%	504	0.03%	65	0.00%	2,390	0.14%	1,656,616
Kanpur Dehat	819	0.05%	1,300	0.07%	1,612,968	89.80%	155	0.01%	176,327	9.82%	478	0.03%	103	0.01%	4,034	0.22%	1,796,184
Kanpur Nagar	2,733	0.06%	15,751	0.34%	3,792,174	82.78%	5,710	0.12%	720,660	15.73%	29,676	0.65%	589	0.01%	13,975	0.31%	4,581,268
Kanshiram Nagar	3,907	0.27%	1,969	0.14%	1,211,427	84.32%	313	0.02%	213,822	14.88%	2,280	0.16%	72	0.01%	2,929	0.20%	1,436,719
Kaushambi	687	0.04%	2,225	0.14%	1,372,381	85.80%	545	0.03%	220,423	13.78%	522	0.03%	3	0.00%	2,810	0.18%	1,599,596
Kheri	18,454	0.46%	7,502	0.19%	3,078,262	76.55%	487	0.01%	807,600	20.08%	94,388	2.35%	226	0.01%	14,324	0.36%	4,021,243
Kushinagar	4,619	0.13%	5,006	0.14%	2,928,462	82.16%	383	0.01%	620,244	17.40%	767	0.02%	133	0.00%	4,930	0.14%	3,564,544
Lalitpur	69	0.01%	1,351	0.11%	1,163,804	95.27%	20,390	1.67%	33,724	2.76%	1,034	0.08%	41	0.00%	1,179	0.10%	1,221,592
Lucknow	3,877	0.08%	20,493	0.45%	3,537,787	77.08%	4,975	0.11%	985,070	21.46%	23,883	0.52%	504	0.01%	13,249	0.29%	4,589,838
Mahamaya Nagar	424	0.03%	1,350	0.09%	1,397,225	89.30%	1,289	0.08%	159,448	10.19%	524	0.03%	63	0.00%	4,385	0.28%	1,564,708
Mahoba	94	0.01%	965	0.11%	815,142	93.06%	234	0.03%	57,454	6.56%	389	0.04%	157	0.02%	1,523	0.17%	875,958
Mahrajganj	16,030	0.60%	3,527	0.13%	2,196,884	81.83%	243	0.01%	458,650	17.08%	1,381	0.05%	338	0.01%	7,650	0.28%	2,684,703
Mainpuri	8,814	0.47%	1,729	0.09%	1,746,649	93.48%	4,161	0.22%	100,723	5.39%	475	0.03%	38	0.00%	5,940	0.32%	1,868,529
Mathura	883	0.03%	3,179	0.12%	2,310,776	90.72%	2,056	0.08%	216,933	8.52%	2,872	0.11%	126	0.00%	10,359	0.41%	2,547,184
Mau	564	0.03%	2,109	0.10%	1,769,937	80.23%	155	0.01%	428,555	19.43%	340	0.02%	129	0.01%	4,179	0.19%	2,205,968
Meerut	1,855	0.05%	10,582	0.31%	2,183,255	63.40%	18,544	0.54%	1,185,643	34.43%	24,912	0.72%	236	0.01%	18,662	0.54%	3,443,689
Mirzapur	341	0.01%	2,373	0.10%	2,292,534	91.81%	701	0.03%	195,765	7.84%	1,133	0.05%	27	0.00%	4,096	0.16%	2,496,970
Moradabad	1,260	0.03%	13,157	0.28%	2,488,265	52.14%	2,426	0.05%	2,248,392	47.12%	7,555	0.16%	382	0.01%	10,569	0.22%	4,772,006
Muzaffarnagar	1,516	0.04%	6,495	0.16%	2,382,914	57.51%	16,345	0.39%	1,711,453	41.30%	18,601	0.45%	60	0.00%	6,128	0.15%	4,143,512
Pilibhit	360	0.02%	3,510	0.17%	1,449,007	71.34%	138	0.01%	489,686	24.11%	84,787	4.17%	45	0.00%	3,474	0.17%	2,031,007
Pratapgarh	7,795	0.24%	3,920	0.12%	2,731,351	85.11%	746	0.02%	452,394	14.10%	1,451	0.05%	43	0.00%	11,441	0.36%	3,209,141
Rae Bareli	722	0.02%	3,634	0.11%	2,975,998	87.39%	397	0.01%	413,243	12.13%	2,424	0.07%	602	0.02%	8,539	0.25%	3,405,559
Rampur	384	0.02%	9,201	0.39%	1,073,890	45.97%	1,307	0.06%	1,181,337	50.57%	65,316	2.80%	63	0.00%	4,321	0.18%	2,335,819
Saharanpur	1,937	0.06%	6,523	0.19%	1,966,892	56.74%	10,208	0.29%	1,454,052	41.95%	18,627	0.54%	135	0.00%	8,008	0.23%	3,466,382
Sant Kabir Nagar	4,393	0.26%	1,766	0.10%	1,300,586	75.83%	95	0.01%	404,410	23.58%	447	0.03%	35	0.00%	3,451	0.20%	1,715,183
Sant Ravidas Nagar (Bhadohi)	1,562	0.10%	1,365	0.09%	1,368,291	86.70%	161	0.01%	203,887	12.92%	199	0.01%	7	0.00%	2,741	0.17%	1,578,213
Shahjahanpur	2,312	0.08%	4,630	0.15%	2,412,595	80.24%	301	0.01%	527,581	17.55%	51,090	1.70%	84	0.00%	7,945	0.26%	3,006,538
Shrawasti	323	0.03%	1,427	0.13%	768,643	68.79%	68	0.01%	343,981	30.79%	407	0.04%	56	0.01%	2,456	0.22%	1,117,361
Siddharthnagar	11,964	0.47%	3,042	0.12%	1,789,704	69.93%	179	0.01%	748,073	29.23%	681	0.03%	356	0.01%	5,298	0.21%	2,559,297
Sitapur	2,663	0.06%	6,579	0.15%	3,555,450	79.29%	1,410	0.03%	893,725	19.93%	11,611	0.26%	79	0.00%	12,475	0.28%	4,483,992
Sonbhadra	1,747	0.09%	3,963	0.21%	1,738,769	93.35%	487	0.03%	103,567	5.56%	1,649	0.09%	1,907	0.10%	10,470	0.56%	1,862,559
Sultanpur	9,989	0.26%	4,453	0.12%	3,119,590	82.16%	426	0.01%	650,261	17.13%	1,629	0.04%	336	0.01%	10,433	0.27%	3,797,117
Unnao	920	0.03%	3,574	0.11%	2,732,016	87.89%	240	0.01%	363,453	11.69%	1,204	0.04%	31	0.00%	6,929	0.22%	3,108,367
Varanasi	1,146	0.03%	7,696	0.21%	3,107,681	84.52%	1,898	0.05%	546,987	14.88%	3,309	0.09%	298	0.01%	7,826	0.21%	3,676,841
STATE (Note: Percentages in 'STATE' are calculated out of total population of UP, depicting the share of each religion's population)	206,285	0.10%	356,448	0.18%	159,312,654	79.73%	213,267	0.11%	38,483,967	19.26%	643,500	0.32%	13,598	0.01%	582,622	0.29%	199,812,341

Religion-wise percentage of UP (2011 Census)
Religion	Rural	Urban	Total
Buddhist	0.09%	0.02%	0.10%
Christian	0.09%	0.09%	0.18%
Hindu	65.03%	14.70%	79.73%
Jain	0.02%	0.09%	0.11%
Muslim	12.09%	7.17%	19.26%
Other religions and persuasions	0.00%	0.00%	0.01%
Religion not stated	0.19%	0.10%	0.29%
Sikh	0.22%	0.11%	0.32%
Total	77.73%	22.27%	100.00%

Literacy among women is quite low, going as low as 50.59% in Muslim community. On the contrary, the Jain community with quite high literacy rates, for both males and females as well. Also noteworthy is that Sikh and Hindu communities have very poor sex-ratios.

== Caste ==
For accurate caste population data in India, the Government of India has not publicly released Socio Economic and Caste Census 2011 caste population data for every single non-SC/ST castes, General castes, OBC/EBCs in India, hence no official figures are available for the same.

As per estimations based on 2011 census, Dalits constitute 21.1% of Uttar Pradesh population. Mallah community is divided in 27 sub-castes. Other Backward Classes (OBCs) constitute over 50% of Uttar Pradesh’s population. Yadavs form the single largest group amongst the OBCs, constituting around 40 percent, and forming almost 15-19 percent of the state's population. There are 200-odd OBCs in U.P. In Uttar Pradesh, Muslims are divided into 68 castes and sub-castes, 35 of them are OBCs. Forward castes constitute around 18-20% of Uttar Pradesh population, in which Brahmins are about 9% and Rajputs are 8%.

Castes of Uttar Pradesh
Caste	Population (%)
OBC	50%
Dalits (SCs)	20-21%
Tribals (STs)	0.1%
Forward caste	18-20%
Muslims	19-20%
Others	0.9%

== Ethnic groups ==
As of 1 March 2011, Uttar Pradesh had a population of over 199.5 million, making it the most populous state in India. If it were an independent country, it would be the sixth most populous in the world.

At the 2011 census of India, 79.7% of Uttar Pradesh population is Hindu. Muslims make up 19.3% of the population, most of whom are Rohillas, a clan of ethnic Pathans. The remaining population consists of Sikhs, Buddhists, Christians and Jains.

The population of Uttar Pradesh is divided into numerous castes and sub-castes. Historically, Hindu society is divided into four sub-divisions or varnas, the Brahmins, Kshatriyas, Vaishyas and Shudras. Muslims are also divided as the Shias and Sunnis. In actual practice, Hindu society in generally used to be divided into numerous lineage groups called jatis. Each jati is then sub-divided into clans, called gotras.

The peripheral regions of Uttar Pradesh, are home to a number of tribal communities such as Agaria, Baiga, Bhar, Bhoksa, Chero, Gond, Kol and Korwa. Five of these tribal communities have been recognised by the Government of India as disadvantaged scheduled tribes, viz. Tharus, Boksas, Bhotias, Jaunswaris and Rajis.

== Languages ==
Most people in Uttar Pradesh speak Hindi (including Urdu, which is often considered the same language), followed by Bhojpuri.

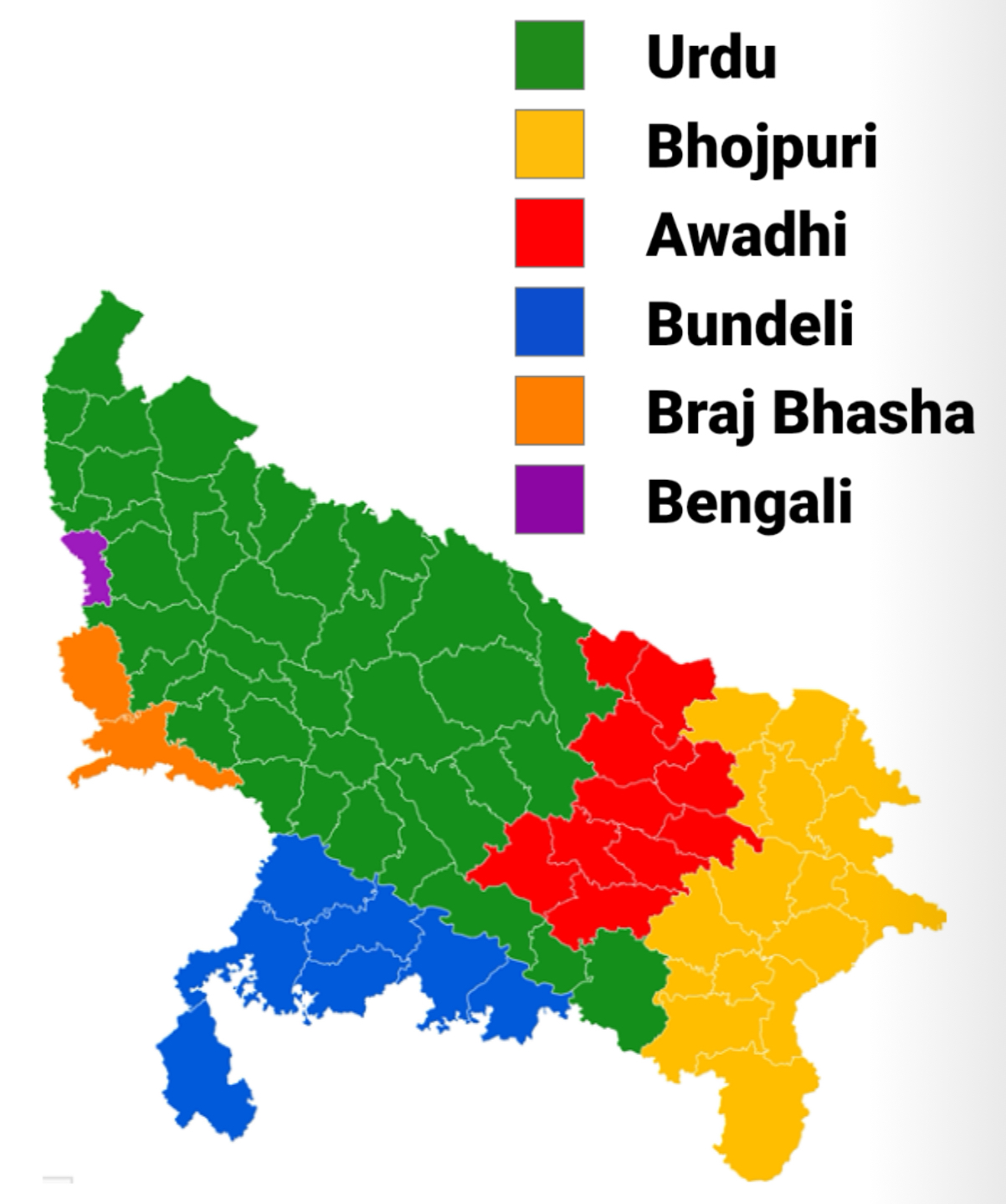
Largest language in Uttar Pradesh besides Hindi, 2011 census

The dialect map of Uttar Pradesh is complex, but, in general, in three of the five sub regions of UP, viz, the Doab, Rohilkhand, and Bundelkhand, both Western and Eastern Hindi, as well as a mixture of the two are spoken. For instance, in the upper and parts of lower Doab (until Etawah), various forms of western Hindi are spoken, including Khari boli and Brij Bhasha. In the rest of lower Doab, various mixes of western and Eastern Hindi (Brij Bhasha/ Bundelkhandi and Awadhi) are spoken). Likewise, in Western Bundelkhand, Bundeli (a language closely related with Brij Bhasha) is spoken, while in Eastern Bundelkhand the dialect is still called 'Bundeli' but is part of Eastern Hindi (actually a mixture of Western and Eastern Hindi). In Western Rohilkhand, Khari boli is spoken. in Central Rohilkhand a mix of Awadhi and Khari boli is spoken, while in Eastern Rohilkhand, Awadhi is the dialect.

As mentioned earlier, often these dialects merge into each other, for example in Shahjahanpur, in Rohilkhand, Khari boli merges into Awadhi.

In eastern Uttar Pradesh, the Bhojpuri language is spoken. It is the second most widely spoken language of Uttar Pradesh after Hindi. It belongs to the Magadhan group of Indo-Aryan languages. This region is known as Bhojpur or Purvanchal. The Bhojpuri variant of Kaithi is the indigenous script of Bhojpuri language.

Uttar Pradesh: mother-tongue of population, according to the 2011 Census.
Mother tongue code	Mother tongue	People	Percentage
001002	Assamese	10,288	0.01%
002007	Bengali	240,966	0.12%
005018	Gujarati	11,938	0.01%
006030	Awadhi	3,801,743	1.90%
006102	Bhojpuri	21,844,783	10.93%
006123	Brajbhasha	713,572	0.36%
006125	Bundeli/Bundel khandi	1,303,940	0.65%
006142	Chhattisgarhi	12,308	0.01%
006195	Garhwali	22,914	0.01%
006235	Haryanvi	16,166	0.01%
006240	Hindi	160,159,977	80.16%
006311	Khari Boli (Kauravi)	16,355	0.01%
006340	Kumauni	11,059	0.01%
006489	Rajasthani	13,382	0.01%
010008	Maithili	16,989	0.01%
011016	Malayalam	24,338	0.01%
013071	Marathi	24,115	0.01%
014011	Nepali	18,734	0.01%
015043	Odia	24,071	0.01%
016038	Punjabi	508,599	0.25%
019014	Sindhi	28,937	0.01%
020027	Tamil	14,426	0.01%
021046	Telugu	13,918	0.01%
022015	Urdu	10,793,391	5.40%
022016	Bhansari	20,993	0.01%
040001	English	13,085	0.01%
N.A.	Others	131,354	0.07%
Total		199,812,341	100.00%

== See also ==
- Distribution of Scheduled Castes by District in Uttar Pradesh
- List of Rajput clans of Uttar Pradesh
