= Bhagmalpur, India =

Bhagmalpur
- Village
- Interactive map of Bhagmalpur
- Country: India
- District: Jaunpur
- State: Uttar Pradesh

Bhagmalpur is a village in the Khuthan block in the district of Jaunpur situated in eastern Uttar Pradesh in India.

The village has been the site of an educational initiative since 2008. Laptops manufactured by as part of the One Laptop Per Child project have been distributed amongst the children in the village and an educational server has been installed which provides offline access to learning content.
