= Pasiyahikhurd =

Pasiyahikhurd is a village in Shahganj, Jaunpur district, Uttar Pradesh, India.
