= Pattinarendrapur =

Village in Varanasi division, Uttar Pradesh

Pattinarendrapur is a village in Khutahan Block, Shahganj Tehsil, Jaunpur District, Varanasi division, Uttar Pradesh, India. Its Postal Code is 223102.

== Colleges ==
- National Inter College( NIC )

प्राथमिक विद्यालय

== Banks ==
- Union Bank of India
- State Bank of India
- State Bank of India – Mini Branch

== ATM's ==
- Union Bank of India ATM
- State Bank of India ATM

== Two wheeler showrooms ==
- Maa Durga Honda
- Hero MotoCorp
- Bajaj Auto

== Transportation ==
=== Road ===
Pattinarendrapur is well connected to Shahganj, Khutahan and Jaunpur. Frequent buses as well as jeeps are available from here.

=== Rail ===
Nearest railway station to this village is Shahganj Railway Station from where there are direct trains to Mumbai, Delhi, Ahmedabad, Varanasi, Allahabad, etc
