= Khetasaray =

Khetasaray is a village in Shahganj, Jaunpur district, Uttar Pradesh, India. It belongs to Faizabad Division. It is located 53 km East of the district headquarters Barabanki, and 81 km from the state capital Lucknow.
