= Sarava Village =

Sarava is a village in Shahganj, Uttar Pradesh, India.
