= Dataon =

Village in Jaunpur, Uttar Pradesh, India

Dataon is a village in Jaunpur, Uttar Pradesh, India.
