= Raidaspur =

Village in Jaunpur, Uttar Pradesh, India

Raidaspur is a village in Jaunpur, Uttar Pradesh, India.
