= Sadatmasaura =

- Census Town
- Interactive map of Sadatmasaura
- Country: India
- State: Uttar Pradesh
- District: Jaunpur district
- Time zone: UTC+5:30 (IST)

Sadatmasaura also known as Sadatmasaura Census Town is a Census Town situated in Jaunpur district of Uttar Pradesh, India.

== Demographics ==
The total population of Sadatmasaura town consists of 4,800 people amongst them 2,452 are males and 2,348 are females.
