= Kashidaspur =

Village in Jaunpur, Uttar Pradesh, India

Coordinates: 25°38′N 83°03′E

Kashidaspur is a village in Jaunpur, Uttar Pradesh, India.
