= Mirsadpur =

Village in Varanasi division, Uttar Pradesh

Mirsadpur is a village in Khutahan, Jaunpur district, Varanasi division, Uttar Pradesh, India.
