= Jamalia =

Village in Jaunpur, Uttar Pradesh, India

Coordinates: 25°35′N 82°37′E

Jamalia is a village in Jaunpur, Uttar Pradesh, India.
