= Nigoh =

Coordinates: 26°45′N 79°09′E

Nigoh is a village located in the Jaunpur district of Uttar Pradesh, India.

Nigoh is located at approximately 50 km from Jaunpur City. There are two railway station in proximity of 12 km. This is central shopping place for surrounding villages. Tej Bahadar Singh High School is situated near the Nigoh market.
