= Khanapatti =

Village in Jaunpur, Uttar Pradesh, India

Coordinates: 25°44′N 82°32′E

Khanapatti is a village in Jaunpur, Uttar Pradesh, India.
