= Birahadpur =

Village in Jaunpur, Uttar Pradesh, India

Birahadpur is a village in Jaunpur, Uttar Pradesh, India.
