= Barhauna =

Village in Jaunpur, Uttar Pradesh, India

Barhauna is a village in Jaunpur, Uttar Pradesh, India.
