= Chakganj =

Village in Uttar Pradesh, India

Chakganj is a village in Khutahan, Jaunpur district, Varanasi division, Uttar Pradesh, India.
