= Sonawan =

Sonawan is a village in Khutahan, Jaunpur district, Varanasi division, Uttar Pradesh, India.
