= Bhadehari =

Coordinates: 25.626°N 82.820°E

Bhadehari is a village in Kerakat nagar panchayat, Jaunpur, Uttar Pradesh, India.

The village contains 360.35 hectares. As at 2011 the population was 2,891 in 442 households.

== Sources ==
- Census of India, 1981: District census handbook. A, Village & town directory; B, Primary census abstract. Controller of Publications, India
