= Kalichabad =

Village in Jaunpur, Uttar Pradesh, India

Kalichabad is a village in Jaunpur, Uttar Pradesh, India.
