= Dhanauha =

Dhanuha
- Census town
- Location in Uttar Pradesh, India Dhanuha (India)
- Coordinates: 25°27′55″N 82°35′05″E
- Country: India
- State: Uttar Pradesh
- District: Jaunpur

Population (2011)
  - Total: 6,212

Language
  - Official: Hindi
  - Additional official: Urdu
- Time zone: UTC+5:30 (IST)
- Vehicle registration: UP
- Website: up.gov.in

Dhanuha is a census town in Jaunpur district in the state of Uttar Pradesh, India.

== Demographics ==
As per 2011 Indian Census, Bahraich had a total population of 6,212, of which 3,277 were males and 2,935 were females. Population within the age group of 0 to 6 years was 846. The total number of literates in Bahraich was 4,090, which constituted 65.4% of the population with male literacy of 71.9% and female literacy of 59.1%. The effective literacy rate of 7+ population of Bahraich was 76.2%, of which male literacy rate was 83.7% and female literacy rate was 68.0%. The Scheduled Castes population was 720. Bahraich had 907 households in 2011.

At the 2001 India census, Dhanauha had a population of 6,213. (males 53%, females 47%). Dhanauha had an average literacy rate of 58%, lower than the national average of 59.5%: male literacy was 69% and female literacy was 46%. 17% of the population were under 6 years of age.
