= Barauna, Jaunpur =

Coordinates: 27°48′N 79°00′E

Barauna is a village in Shahganj tehsil of Jaunpur District in Uttar Pradesh, India. Most of the residents are farmers.

The village has a government primary school, as well as a senior secondary school.
