= Pankaj Patel (politician) =

Indian politician

Member of the Uttar Pradesh Legislative Assembly
- Incumbent
- Assumed office March 2022
- Constituency: Mungra Badshahpur Assembly constituency

Personal details
- Born: 1990 (age 35–36)
- Party: Samajwadi Party
- Education: Bundel Khand Degree College
- Occupation: Politician

Pankaj Patel (born 20 January 1990) is an Indian politician from Uttar Pradesh. He is a member of the Uttar Pradesh Legislative Assembly from Mungra Badshahpur Assembly constituency in Jaunpur district. He won the 2022 Uttar Pradesh Legislative Assembly election representing the Samajwadi Party.

== Early life and education ==
Patel is born in Jaunpur, Jaunpur district, Uttar Pradesh. He is the son of Phool Chand Patel. He completed his LLB in 2013 at Bundel Khand Degree College, Jhansi. and got married recently

== Career ==
Patel won from the Mungra Badshahpur Assembly constituency representing the Samajwadi Party in the 2022 Uttar Pradesh Legislative Assembly election. He polled 92,048 votes and defeated his nearest rival, Ajay Dubey of Bharatiya Janata Party, by a margin of 5,230 votes.
