= Chhitauna =

Village in Jaunpur, Uttar Pradesh, India

Chhitauna is a village in Jaunpur, Uttar Pradesh, India.
