= Sarawan, Jaunpur =

Sarawan, Jaunpur Sarawan
- Village
- Location in Uttar Pradesh, India Sarawan, Jaunpur (India)
- Coordinates: 25.73°N 82.68°E
- Country: India
- State: Uttar Pradesh
- District: Jaunpur
- Elevation: 82 m (269 ft)

Population (2001)
  - Total: 6,700

Languages
  - Official: Hindi
- Time zone: UTC+5:30 (IST)
- Website: www.sarawan.in

Sarawan is a village in Tehsil:"Mungra Badshahpur" and belong to post:"Pawaran", in Jaunpur, Uttar Pradesh, India.
