= Izari =

- Village
- Interactive map of Izari
- Coordinates: 25°37′38″N 82°45′36″E
- Country: India
- State: Uttar Pradesh
- District: Jaunpur district
- Tehsil: Jaunpur
- Time zone: UTC+5.30 (Indian Standard Time)

Izari is a village located in Jaunpur district of Uttar Pradesh, India.

== Demographics ==
According to the 2011 Indian Census the village has a population of 3,702, 1,884 males and 1,818 female.
