= Kabiruddinpur =

Village in Jaunpur, Uttar Pradesh, India

Kabiruddinpur is a village in Jaunpur, Uttar Pradesh, India.
