= Sukkhipur =

Village in Jaunpur, Uttar Pradesh, India

Sukkhipur is a village in Jaunpur, Uttar Pradesh, India.
