= Tej Bahadur Singh =

Indian Politician

Tej Bahadur Singh (1947–2013) was a member of the Indian National Congress who represented Rari state assembly constituency in Jaunpur district of Uttar Pradesh. Being active in youth politics since college days, he was also the president of Youth Congress, Mr. Singh was also the president of management committee of the famous T.D college of Jaunpur.

Singh was killed when he was hit by a train as he was taking his morning walk.
