= Gomateshwar Mahadev Temple, Kerakat =

Hindu Temple in Uttar Pradesh, India

Religion
- Affiliation: Hinduism
- District: Jaunpur district
- Deity: Shiva (Mahadeva)
- Festival: Shivratri

Location
- Location: Sihauli, Kerakat
- State: Uttar Pradesh
- Country: India
- Interactive map of Gomateshwar Mahadev Temple, Kerakat
- Coordinates: 25°38′04″N 82°54′36″E

Architecture
- Creator: Harshvardhan Era

The Gomateshwar Mahadeva Temple Kerakat (Devanagari: गोमतेश्वर महादेव मंदिर केराकत, Gomateshwar Mahādeva Mandir), is a temple at Kerakat in Uttar Pradesh, India. The name means "the Great God of the Gomati River", and it is the largest and most ornate Hindu temple in the medieval temple group. It is considered one of the best examples of temples preserved from the medieval period in India.

== Location ==
It is situated at the bank of Gomati River in Sihauli village in Kerakat.

== History ==
This temple is built in Harshvardhan era, but Shivlinga buried by Muslim attackers. Rebuilt in 1990 by some villagers when they found the shivlinga.
