= Miyanbag =

Miyanbag is a village in Shahganj, Uttar Pradesh, India.
