= Banagawn =

Village in Shahganj, Uttar Pradesh, India

Banagawn is a village in Shahganj, Uttar Pradesh, India.
