= Dhannupur =

Dhannupur is a village in Shahganj, Uttar Pradesh, India.
