= Pilkichha =

Village in Uttar Pradesh, India

Coordinates: 25°58′N 82°33′E

Pilkichha is a village in Khutahan, Jaunpur district, Varanasi division, Uttar Pradesh, India.

- Tehsil Name: Shahganj
- District: Jaunpur
- State: Uttar Pradesh
- Division: Varanasi
- Language: Hindi and Urdu
- Time zone: IST (UTC+5:30)
- Elevation / Altitude: 84 meters above sea level
- Telephone Code / Std Code: 05364
- Pin Code: 223107
- Post Office Name: Pilkichha

== Overview of Pilkichha ==
Pilkichha is 3rd biggest gram sbha in the Jaunpur district. There is a Gomti River in Pilkichha. It's 100 km from Prayagraj and around the same from Varansi.

Jaunpur, Mau, Sultanpur, Azamgarh are the nearby Cities to Pilkichha.

== Demographics of Pilkichha ==
Awadhi is the Local Language here. People speak Hindi as well

== Communications ==
There are two nearby railway stations Shahganj which 13 km from Pilkichha Badalapur (Shri Krishna NagarRailway station) which is almost 15 km from Pilkichha

== Education ==
=== Colleges near Pilkichha ===
Gram Vikas Inter College Khuthan Address : National Intermediate College Pattinarendrapur Address : Madarsa Arbia Riyazul Ulom Address : Baddopur. Shahganj. Jaunpur.u.p...India Madarsa Darul Uloom Address : Baddopur Shahganj Jaunpur Mr.raviraj Post Greaduat College Nauli Jaunpur Address : Nauli Jaunpur Up

=== Schools near Pilkichha ===
Samajvadi I.c. Gabhiran Address : gabhiran, khuthan, jaunpur, Uttar Pradesh . PIN- 222104

Inter College Ranipur Address : rani pur, khuthan, jaunpur, Uttar Pradesh . PIN- 222104

Brijesh I.c.gulalpur Address : gulal pura, khuthan, jaunpur, Uttar Pradesh . PIN- 222139, Post – Khetasarai

Baba M.d.j.h.s.mubarakpur Address : mubarak pur, khuthan, jaunpur, Uttar Pradesh . PIN- 222104

== Administrative division ==
=== Sub Villages in Pilkichha ===
There are 84 Purva(Sub village) and few names are

- Khobhariya
- Harikapura
- Kastura
- Kokana
- Malikpatti
- Nakabi
- Taniya
- Viasiya
- Daulatpur
- Tanaya
- Rampur
