= Mariahu railway station =

Railway station in Uttar Pradesh, India

Mariahu Railway Station

General information
- Location: Mariahu, Jaunpur District, Uttar Pradesh; India
- Coordinates: 25.62°N 82.62°E
- Owner: Ministry of Railways (India)
- Operator: Indian Railways
- Line: Prayagraj-Mau-Gorakhpur line
- Platforms: 1
- Tracks: 1
- Connections: Bus stand, Taxi stand, Auto stand

Construction
- Structure type: Standard

Other information
- Status: Active
- Station code: MAY
- Zone(s): Northern Railway
- Division(s): Lucknow NR

History
- Opened: 1905

Passengers
- 500 - 1,000

Services
Location
- Location within Uttar Pradesh Location within India

Mariahu railway station (station code MAY) is located in Mariahu, Jaunpur District, Uttar Pradesh, India.

This station is part of Northern Railway Zone's Lucknow NR Division and the Prayagraj-Gorakhpur line via Jaunpur-Ayodhya-Mau.

This station is a category (NSG 5) in Northern Railway.

== Overview ==
Mariahu Railway station is a low-revenue station, serving over 500 - 1,000 passengers and over 5 Mail/ Express and almost 8 passenger train on daily basis. It is under the administrative control of the Northern Railway zone's Lucknow NR railway division.

The station is connected to the city via buses and taxis. Tickets can be reserved through a computerized system or online via railway ticketing partners.

Mariahu Railway station is well connected with many important cultural cites such as Mumbai, Varanasi, Ayodhya, Azamgarh, Jaunpur, Chhapra, etc.

It is one of the railway stations in Jaunpur district, Uttar Pradesh, India. It is situated on the south side of the city about 20 km from Jaunpur Junction Railway Station. This station is under the Prayagraj-Mau-Gorakhpur main line.

== History ==
Mariahu Railway Station was constructed by the British in 1905, during the colonial era. Its establishment was a part of the broader expansion of the railway network in British India to connect important trade and administrative centers. The line passing through Mariahu is the Zafarabad-Janghai Junction route, which was initially part of the Oudh and Rohilkhand Railway.

== Key modernization projects ==
Mariahu Railway Station is undergoing a significant modernization project under the Indian Railways' Amrit Bharat Station Scheme. The foundation stone for the redevelopment was virtually laid by Prime Minister Narendra Modi in February 2024. The project is intended to provide world-class amenities and infrastructure.

An investment of ₹11.74 crore has been allocated specifically for Mariahu Railway Station's makeover.

== See also ==
- Northern Railway Zone
- Prayagraj Junction
- Varanasi Junction
- Jaunpur Junction
- Prayagraj-Mau-Gorakhpur line
