= Samodhpur =

Samodhpur is a village in Khutahan, Jaunpur district, Varanasi division, Uttar Pradesh, India. It is a small village located on the border of Jaunpur adjoining Sultanpur. It has an inter college for higher secondary education and a degree college for graduate and postgraduate studies. Village also has a rural bank named Kashi Sanyut Gomati Gramin Bank. Village Samodhpur has a post office and its Pincode 223102. The village has a fair proportion of Muslim and Hindu population. The village has produced many scholars serving for many national and international organisation.
