= Dhamur Khas =

Dhamur Khas is a village in Khutahan, Jaunpur district, Varanasi division, Uttar Pradesh, India.
