= Madho Patti =

Indian village in Jaunpur, Uttar Pradesh

- Village
- Location in Uttar Pradesh, India Madho Patti (India)
- Coordinates: 25°40′36″N 82°41′51″E
- Country: India
- State: Uttar Pradesh
- Division: Varanasi
- District: Jaunpur
- Block: Jaunpur

Government
  - Type: Gram panchayat
- Time zone: UTC+5:30 (IST)
- PIN Code: 222001
- Telephone code: +91-5452
- Vehicle registration: UP-62

Madho Patti (Hindi: माधो पट्टी) is a rural village in Jaunpur Block of Jaunpur district in Uttar Pradesh. People of Kshatriya, Yadav, Maurya, Khatik, Kumhar, Nat, Kayastha etc castes live in Gaddipur Madhopatti village with a population of four thousand. This village is situated around 7 km from Jaunpur city. It is said that village is making a significant contribution to the country. The hamlet has given India 47 Indian Administrative Service and state PCS officers. It all began in 1914, when Mohammad Mustafa Hussain cleared the civil services under British rule, becoming the village's first officer. In 1952, Indu Prakash Singh became the IFS officer followed by Vinay Kumar Singh (IAS) in 1955, who later went on to become the chief secretary of Bihar.

A number of people have chosen for a career in civil services; some youngsters from the village have also found successful careers with the Indian Space Research Organisation (ISRO), the Bhabha Atomic Research Centre and the World Bank. Not just this, the village has broken a record after four siblings cracked the exam and got selected for the IAS.it has an area of about 1500 to 1600 acres

== Relevance ==
It is among those villages that have a status of IAS and IPS officers. This village has so far given 47 IAS and IPS officers to the country. All those were employed in the offices of prime minister and chief ministers. This village was in the media for many years as representatives of news channels and newspapers have been visiting this village. This village is still beyond the eyes of the government.

== Culture of civil service ==
There are a total of 75 houses in Madho Patti village, but the number of officers who came out of this place is more than 50. It is not just about sons and daughters of this village, daughters-in-law are also handling the post of officers. Students here start preparing for the Civil Services Examination from college time itself. They start basic preparation from the time of college, after which they sit in the exam with complete preparation. Local people say that the people here see competition in the field of education and its performance is seen in their results.

== Demographic ==
The village of Madho Patti has a population of around 4,000 which is inhabited by people belonging to the Kshatriya, Yadav, Maurya, Khatik, Kumhar, Nat, Kayastha etc castes. In this village of officers, most of the population is dependent on farming.

Wheat, gram, peas, pigeon pea, mustard, potato, maize, sugarcane etc. are cultivated in the village. The village has three primary schools and a junior high school, two inter colleges.
