= Argupurkala =

Argupurkala is a village in Shahganj, Uttar Pradesh, India.
