= Bansafa =

Village in Jaunpur, Uttar Pradesh, India

Coordinates: 25°45′N 82°31′E

Bansafa is a village in Jaunpur, Uttar Pradesh, India.
