= Khairapara =

Village in Uttar Pradesh, India

Khairapara is a village in Jaunpur, Uttar Pradesh, India.
