= Kulhanamau =

Village in Jaunpur, Uttar Pradesh

Kulhanamau is a village in Jaunpur, Uttar Pradesh, India.
