= Siura =

Village in Jaunpur, Uttar Pradesh, India

Coordinates: 26°24′N 82°03′E

Siura is a village in Jaunpur, Uttar Pradesh, India.
