= Gahlai =

Village in Jaunpur, Uttar Pradesh, India

Coordinates: 25°34′N 82°34′E

Gahlai is a village in Jaunpur, Uttar Pradesh, India. The nearest railway stations to the village are Bhanaur and Mariyahu. The average maximum temperature of the village is 45 °C and the minimum is 12 °C.
