= Sadaruddinpur =

Village in Jaunpur, Uttar Pradesh, India

Sadaruddinpur is a village in Jaunpur, Uttar Pradesh, India.
