= Nanwag =

The Nandwaks/Nanwag Rajputs are a branch of the Kachwaha Rajput in what is now the Indian state of Uttar Pradesh. In the 16th century, founder of nanwag dynasty shree Naun Rao ji and his descendants seized mariahun tahasil and ruled there for many years after. The villages of Atariya Kathiraon, Newarhia (having fort of Nanwag chieftain, Zamindar Sangram Singh) lying at 25" 31' N longitude and 82" 80' E latitude (tahsil Mariahu) and Barsathi, latitude 25" 34' N and longitude 82" 91' E in Mariahu tehsil, were administered by the Nanwag Rajputs from the 16th century to the later part of the 19th century. The whole of Mariahu tehsil was administered by them during the medieval period and the tehsil got its name from Mandav Dev, the presiding deity of Nanwags. currently they are spread in Prayagraj, Azamgarh, Mirzapur and Varanasi district. In census report of 1865, population of Nanwag rajput was approximate 24,000.

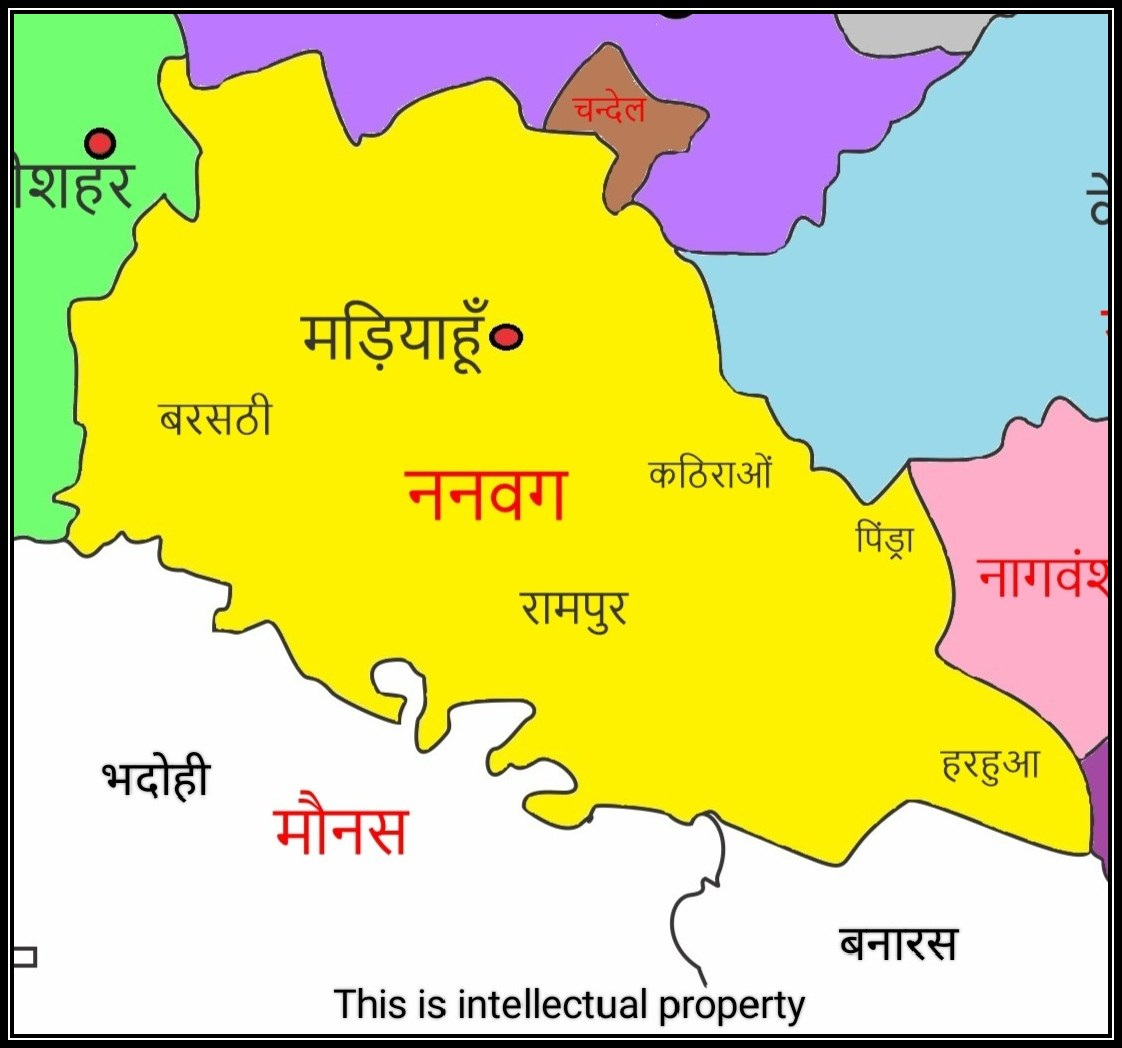

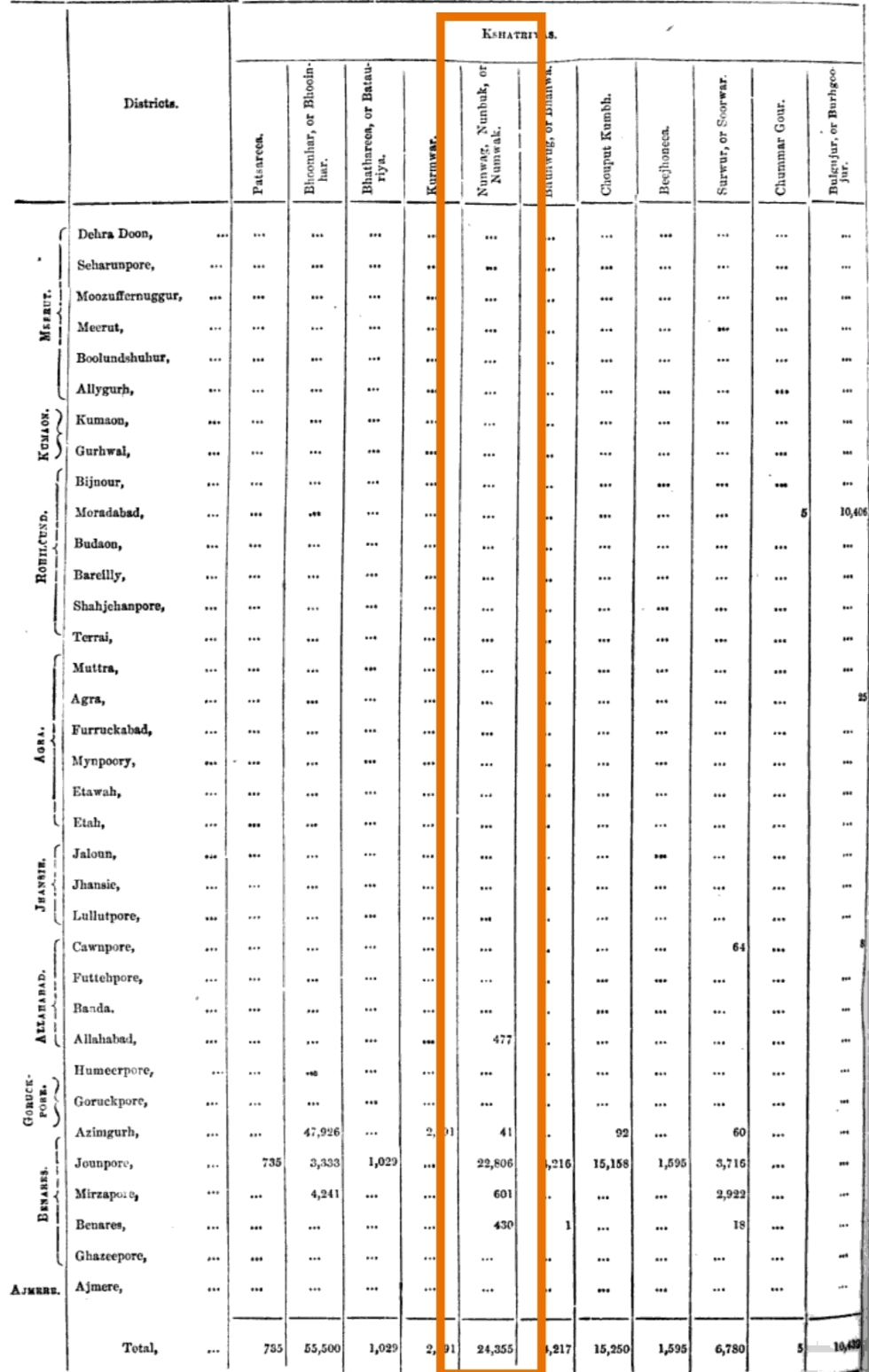
Nanwag census

== See also ==
- Rajput clans
