= List of Rajput clans and dynasties of Uttar Pradesh =

This is a list of Rajput clans of Uttar Pradesh. A clan is a group of people united by actual or perceived kinship and descent. Even if lineage details are unknown, clan members may be organized around a founding member or apical ancestor. The kinship-based bonds may be symbolic, whereby the clan shares a "stipulated" common ancestor that is a symbol of the clan's unity. When this "ancestor" is non-human, it is referred to as a totem, which is frequently an animal.

== Rajput clans of Uttar Pradesh ==
- Bais
- Bandhalgoti
- Bargujar
- Bhati
- Chandel
- Chauhan
- Dor
- Gaharwar/Gahadval
- Gaur
- Gautam
- Gehlot
- Jadaun
- Kachhwaha
- Meghwal people
- Nanwag
- Parihar
- Parmar
- Pundir
- Rathore
- Sengar
- Sisodia
- Solanki
- Tomar

== See also ==
- Caste
- Caste system in India
- Rajputs in Bihar
