= Tekardih =

Village in Jaunpur, Uttar Pradesh, India

Tekardih is a village in Jaunpur, Uttar Pradesh, India.
