= Dakhin Patti =

Village in India

- Village
- Location in Uttar Pradesh, India Dakhin Patti (India)
- Coordinates: 25.8295040°N 82.5381079°E
- Country: India
- State: Uttar Pradesh
- District: Jaunpur

Area
  - Total: 0.4405 km^{2} (0.1701 sq mi)

Population (2011)
  - Total: 1,146
  - Density: 2,602/km^{2} (6,738/sq mi)

Language
  - Official: Hindi
  - Additional official: Urdu
- Time zone: UTC+5:30 (IST)
- PIN: 222109

Dakhin Patti is a village in Baksha block in Jaunpur district, Varanasi division, Uttar Pradesh State, India. It is located 20km towards west from District head quarters Jaunpur. It is 1km from Baksha and 228km from State capital Lucknow.

== Landmarks ==
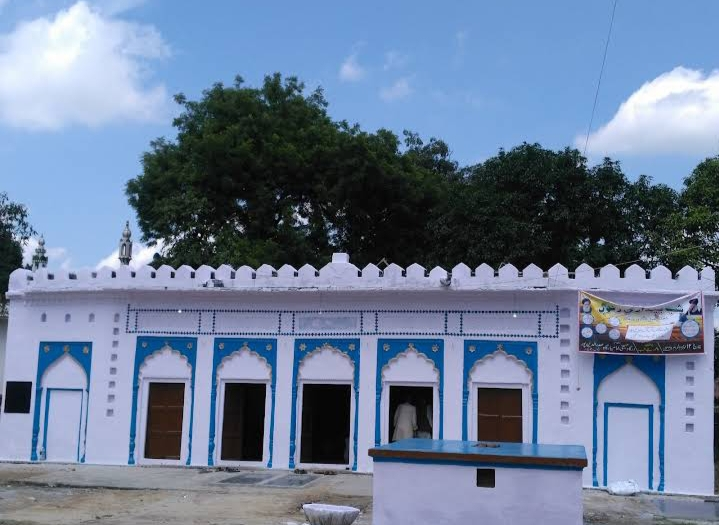
Imambargah Of Dakhin Patti

There are a number of tourist attractions in Dakhin Patti including monuments, and holy places.

=== Religious sites ===
- Anjan Shaheed
- Imambargah Of Dakhin Patti
- Ranno Amari
- Rauza-e-Rasul-e-Khuda
- Rauza-e-Bibi Fatima Zahra

== Census(2011) ==
Dakhin Patti is a medium size village with total 146 families residing. The Dakhin Patti village has population of 1146 of which 563 are males while 583 are females as per Population Census 2011. In Dakhin Patti village population of children with age 0-6 is 211 which makes up 18.41% of total population of village. Average Sex Ratio of Dakhin Patti village is 1036 which is higher than Uttar Pradesh state average of 912. Child Sex Ratio for the Dakhin Patti as per census is 918, higher than Uttar Pradesh average of 902.

Dakhin Patti village has higher literacy rate compared to Uttar Pradesh. In 2011, literacy rate of Dakhin Patti village was 68.34% compared to 67.68% of Uttar Pradesh. In Dakhin Patti male literacy stands at 78.59% while female literacy rate was 58.71%.

As per constitution of India and Panchyati Raaj Act, Dakhin Patti village is administrated by Sarpanch (Head of Village) who is elected representative of village.

== Transportation ==
=== Rail ===
- Bakhsha Rail Way Station 2.9 KM
- Harkhu Rail Way Station 3.5 KM
- City Rail Way Station 17 KM
- Junction Rail Way Station 19 KM

=== Air ===
- Varanasi Airport 58 KM
- Bamrauli Airport 101 KM
- Gorakhpur Airport 153 KM
- Amausi Airport 219 KM
