= Badlapur, Jaunpur =

Badlapur
- Tehsil and Town Area
- Location in Uttar Pradesh, India Badlapur (India)
- Coordinates: 25.53°N 82.27°E
- Country: India
- State: Uttar Pradesh
- District: Jaunpur

Government
  - MLA: Ramesh Mishra (Bhartiya Janta Party)

Population (2011)
  - Total: 36,943
  - Density: 36,943/km^{2} (95,680/sq mi)

Language
  - Official: Hindi
  - Additional official: Urdu
  - Other: Awadhi
- Time zone: UTC+5:30 (IST)
- Postal code: 222125
- Telephone code: 05453
- Vehicle registration: UP-62
- Sex ratio: 1000:1009 ♂/♀

Badlapur is an administrative division in Jaunpur District in the Indian state of Uttar Pradesh. It was accorded the status of Town Area Nagar Panchayat on 27 June 2014.

== Geography ==
Badlapur is located at 25.53°N 82.27°E. It has been assigned 222 125 pin code by India Post.

== Demographics ==
As of the 2001 Census of India, Badlapur had a population of 36,943. Males constitute 51% of the population and females 49%. Machhlishahr has an average literacy rate of 59%, male literacy is 76.99%, and female literacy is 43.35%. In Machhlishahr, 18% of the population is under 6 years of age. Represented in the U.P. State Assembly by MLA Subhash Pandey of the BSP.

== See also ==
- Saraiharkhu
