= Saraiharkhu =

Saraiharkhu a village situated in Jaunpur, Uttar Pradesh in India on the Janpur - Lucknow road, about 18 km (11 mi) form the city of Jaunpur.

It is a green village without pollution. Area of this village is large with a large population including several castes and religions.

In this village, a Bhakti Organization has been running since 1932. It is named "Shri Sitaram Dharm Mandal".

== Shri Sitaram Dharm Mandal ==
The main aim of this organization is to distribute bhakti and to teach rules and regulations of God Ramachandra by organizing Ramleela during Dussehra. This organization is old and famous, large audiences come here every year during the period. Ramleela is enacted for five days and on the sixth day, a large fair is organised in the village named as "Vijyadashmi". The important thing about this organization is that it started with only Kayastha family members of the village as members and now this organization has more than 100 members working in different parts of the country and abroad and in important fields. Every year not only members but also audiences with family come for six days, leaving their important work. This shows how unity and love between the peoples of this village is an example to be followed. Many great personalities also attend Ramleela.

In 2007 "Shri Sitaram Dharm Mandal" is going to celebrate the Platinum Jubilee of completing 75 years of continuous organisation of Ramleela. Residents of the village and members of this organization are excited. They are eagerly await Dusherra. Ramleela is planned along with extra events. An honorable personality will inaugurate the events.

== Sources ==
- dharmmandal.com
