= Sushma Patel =

Indian politician

MLA, 17th Legislative Assembly
- In office 2017–2022
- Constituency: Mungra Badshahpur, Jaunpur, Uttar Pradesh

Personal details
- Party: Bharatiya Janata Party
- Other political affiliations: Samajwadi Party
- Occupation: MLA
- Profession: Politician

Sushma S. Patel is an Indian politician and a member of 17th Legislative Assembly, Uttar Pradesh in India. She represented the Mungra Badshahpur constituency in Jaunpur district of Uttar Pradesh. She is a member of Bharatiya Janata Party.

== Political career ==
Sushma Patel contested Uttar Pradesh Assembly Election as Bahujan Samaj Party candidate and defeated her close contestant Seema Dwivedi from Bharatiya Janata Party with a margin of 5,920 votes.

== Posts held ==
#	From	To	Position	Comments
01	2017	2022	Member, 17th Legislative Assembly	

== See also ==
- Uttar Pradesh Legislative Assembly
