= Kathiraon =

- Village
- Village location on Varanasi district map Kathiraon (Uttar Pradesh) Kathiraon (India)
- Coordinates: 25.533179°N 82.737412°E
- Country: India
- State: Uttar Pradesh
- Elevation: 87.6 m (287 ft)

Population (2011)
  - Total: 11,994

Languages
  - Official: Hindi
- Time zone: UTC+5:30 (IST)
- Postal code: 221207
- Telephone code: +91-5450
- Vehicle registration: UP65 XXXX
- Village code: 208434
- Website: up.gov.in

Kathiraon is a village in Pindra Tehsil of Varanasi district in the Indian state of Uttar Pradesh. Kathiraon has its own gram panchayat in the same name as the village. The village is about 45 kilometres (28 miles) north-west of Varanasi city, 269 kilometres (167 miles) south-east of state capital Lucknow and 778 kilometres (483 miles) south-east of the national capital Delhi.

== Demography ==
Kathiraon has a total population of 11,994 people amongst 1,823 families. The sex ratio of Kathiraon is 1,045 and child sex ratio is 910. The Uttar Pradesh state average for both ratios is 912 and 902 respectively.^{[note]}

Details	Male	Female	Total	Comments
Number of houses	-	-	1,823	(census 2011)
Adult	4,898	5,249	10,147	(census 2011)
Children (0–6 years)	967	880	1,847	(census 2011)
Total population	5,865	6,129	11,994	(census 2011)
Literacy	83.73%	57.02%	69.91%	(census 2011)

== Transportation ==
Kathiraon can be accessed by road and does not have a railway station of its own. The closest railway station to this village is Jalalganj railway station, which is 14 kilometres (8.7 miles) north-east. The nearest operational airports are Varanasi airport, which is 29 kilometres (18 miles) south-east, and Allahabad Airports, that lies 126 kilometres (78 miles) west.

== Notes ==
- All demographic data is based on 2011 Census of India.
