= Khuthan =

Khuthan is a block of Jaunpur District. The Population of Khuthan is 15000. Khuthan is a police station in Shahganj tehsil. It is a market and vegetable Mandi. It was a Vidhan Sabha Constituency till 2012.Sailendra Yadav Lalai was the last MLA of Khuthan.
