= Kerakat =

Kerakat Kitgiri
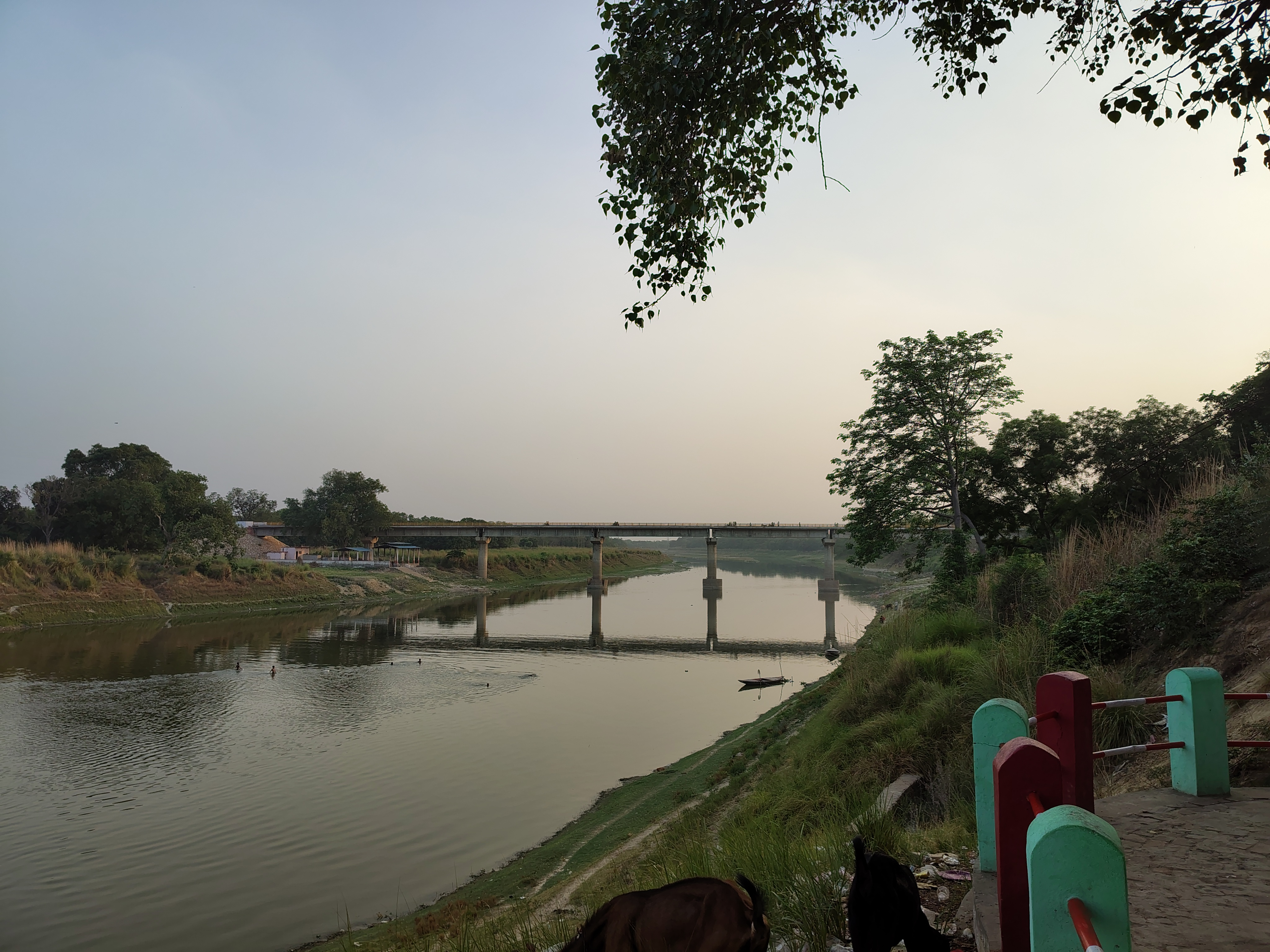
- Town View of Gomti river and the bridge, from the Embankment of Gomateshwar Mahadev Temple

- Location in Uttar Pradesh, India Kerakat (India)
- Coordinates: 25.635152°N 82.922734°E
- Country: India
- State: Uttar Pradesh
- District: Jaunpur
- Tehsil: Kerakat
- Founder: Buddha Dharma

Government
  - Type: Nagar Panchayat/Vidhan Sabha

Area
  - Total: 5 km^{2} (1.9 sq mi)
  - Rank: 2

Population (2011)
  - Total: 13,525
  - Density: 2,700/km^{2} (7,000/sq mi)

Language
  - Official: Hindi
  - Additional official: Urdu
  - Regional: Bhojpuri
- Time zone: UTC+5:30 (IST)
- PIN: 222142,22146
- Vehicle registration: UP-62
- Sex ratio: 1000/943 ♂/♀
- Distance from Varanasi: 41 kilometres (25 mi)
- Distance from Jaunpur: 30 kilometres (19 mi)
- Distance from Ghazipur: 74 kilometres (46 mi)
- Distance from Azamgarh: 70 kilometres (43 mi)
- Lok Sabha constituency: Machhlishahr (Lok Sabha constituency)
- Website: http://jaunpur.nic.in/

Kerakat or Kirakat is a town and nagar panchayat in Jaunpur district of the Indian state of Uttar Pradesh with a population of approximately 13,500. It is situated near the Gomati River, which helps the land around the town stay very fertile. Kerakat or Kirakat forms a part of Varanasi Division. It is located 30 km east of the city of Jaunpur and 279 km from Lucknow, the capital of Uttar Pradesh.

The town's Postal Index Number is 222142 and it has a postal head office, as well as a police station. It is also a block and tehsil.

== History ==
Kerakat was known as Kitagiri in Gautam Buddha's time. According to Kitagiri Sutta, Majjim Nikaya of Suttapitaka, Kerakat is known as Nigam.

== Demographics ==
As of the 2011 Census of India, Kerakat nagar panchayat had a population of 13,525, of which males were 6,987 and females 6,538. Population within the age group of 0 to 6 years was 1,804. The total number of literates in Kerakat was 9,475, which constituted 70.1% of the population with male literacy was 75.2%, and female literacy is 64.6%. The effective literacy rate of 7+ population of Kerakat was 80.8%, of which male literacy rate was 87.2% and female literacy rate was 74.1%. The Scheduled Castes population was 1,835. Kerakat had 1924 households in 2011.

== Administration ==
The town is a part of Machhlishahr constituency for national elections and is Kerakat (Vidhan Sabha constituency) (itself a constituency) for state elections.

== Places of interest ==
- Adi Mata Kali Temple, Kerakat. Built in 1867.
- Gomateshwar Mahadev Temple, Kerakat

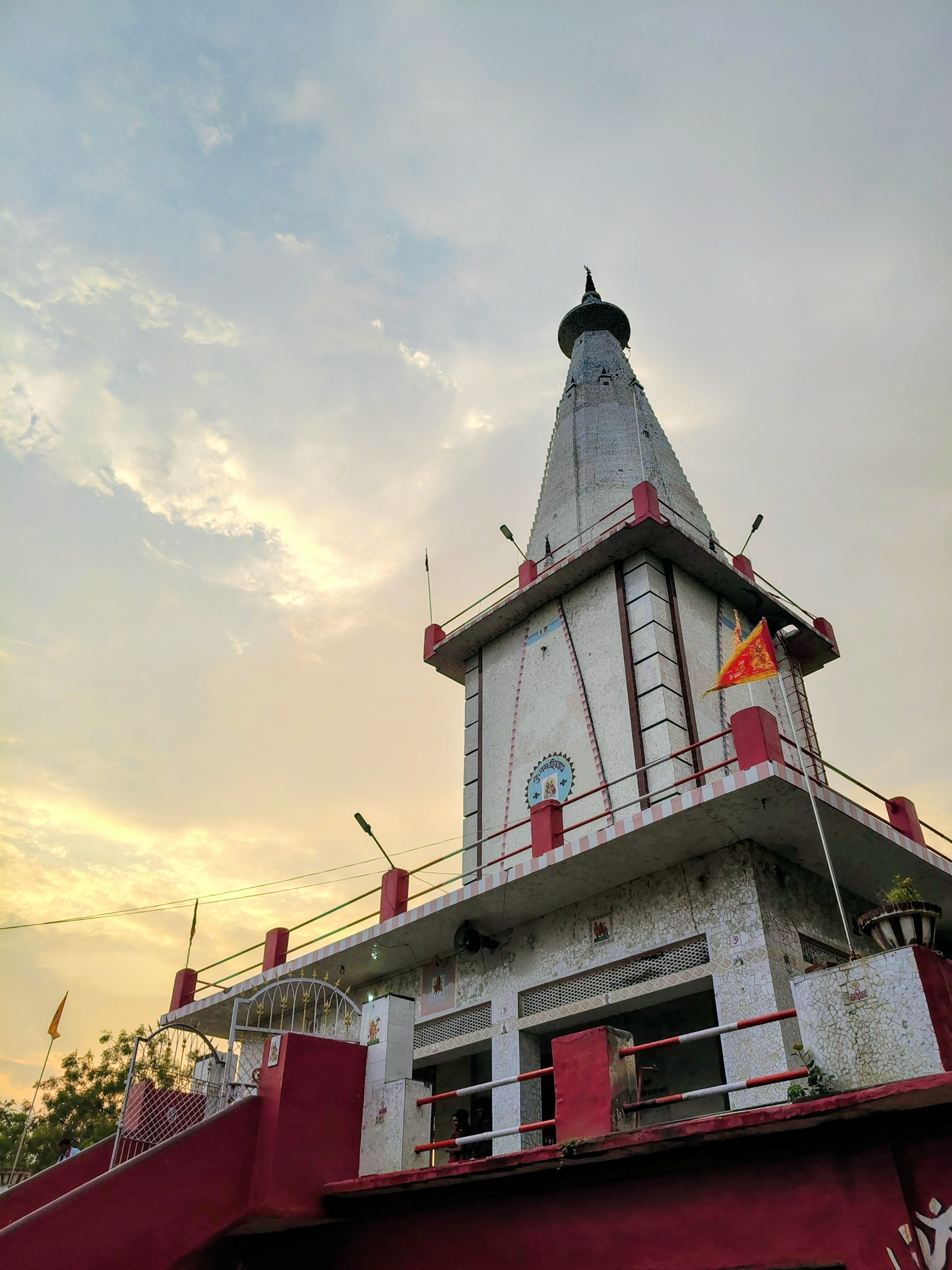
Shikhar of Gomateshwar Mahadev Temple in Kerakat, on the banks of river gomti.

== Transportation ==
=== Rail ===
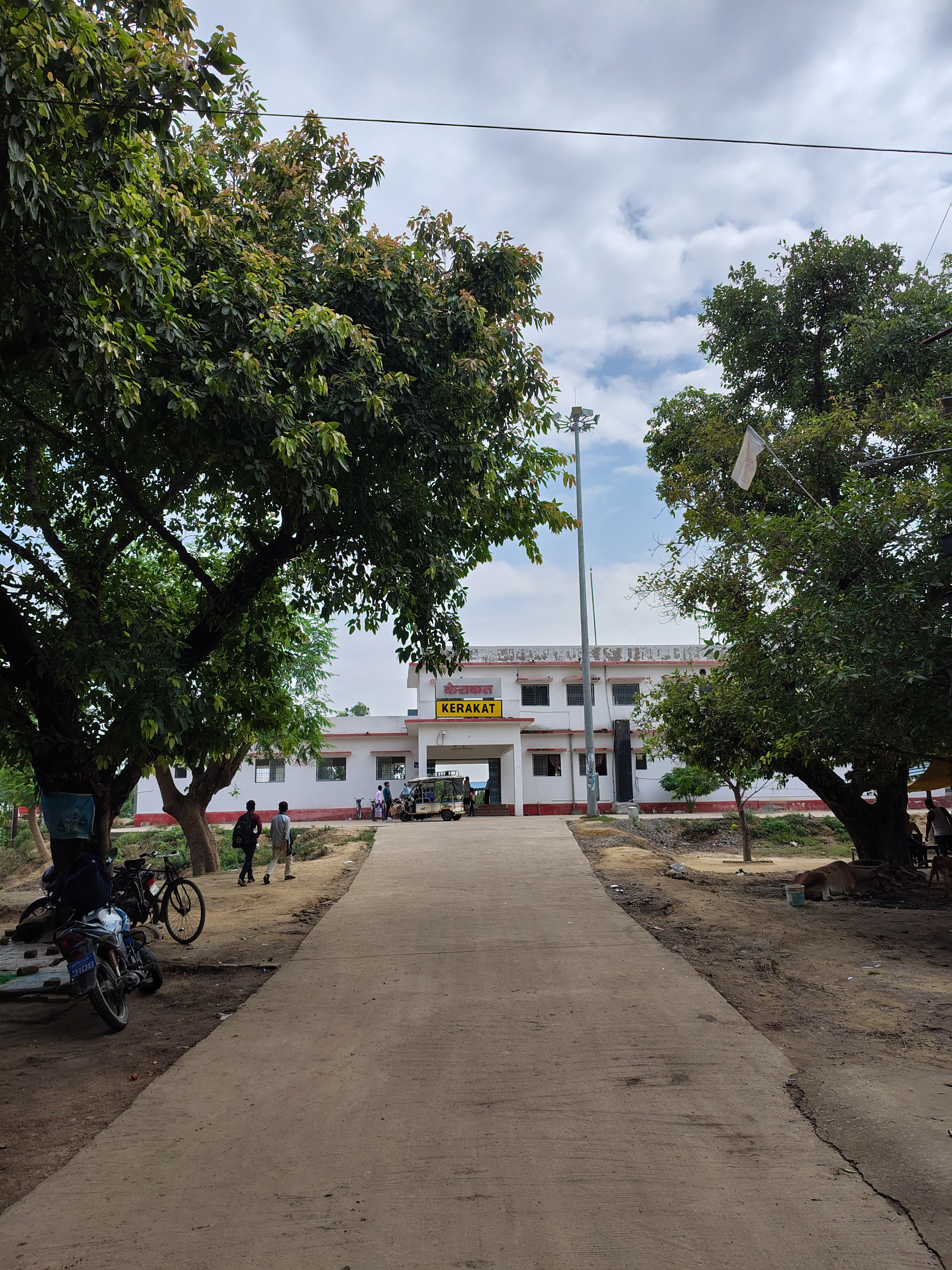
New Building of Kerakat Railway Station; constructed after 2018

Kirakat railway station is a small railway station which belongs to the North Eastern Railway. Kerakat railway station is one of the railway stations on the Aunrihar-Kerakat-Jaunpur Line section. The station is situated 0.7 kilometres (0.43 mi) north side from Kerakat Main Market. The station falls under the administration of Varanasi division, North Eastern Railway zone. The station Code is KCT. Many passenger trains, including expresses, stop at the station. Neighbourhood stations are Dobhi and Gangauli. The closest major station are Jaunpur Junction Railway Station, Varanasi Junction and Aunrihar Junction.

=== Road ===
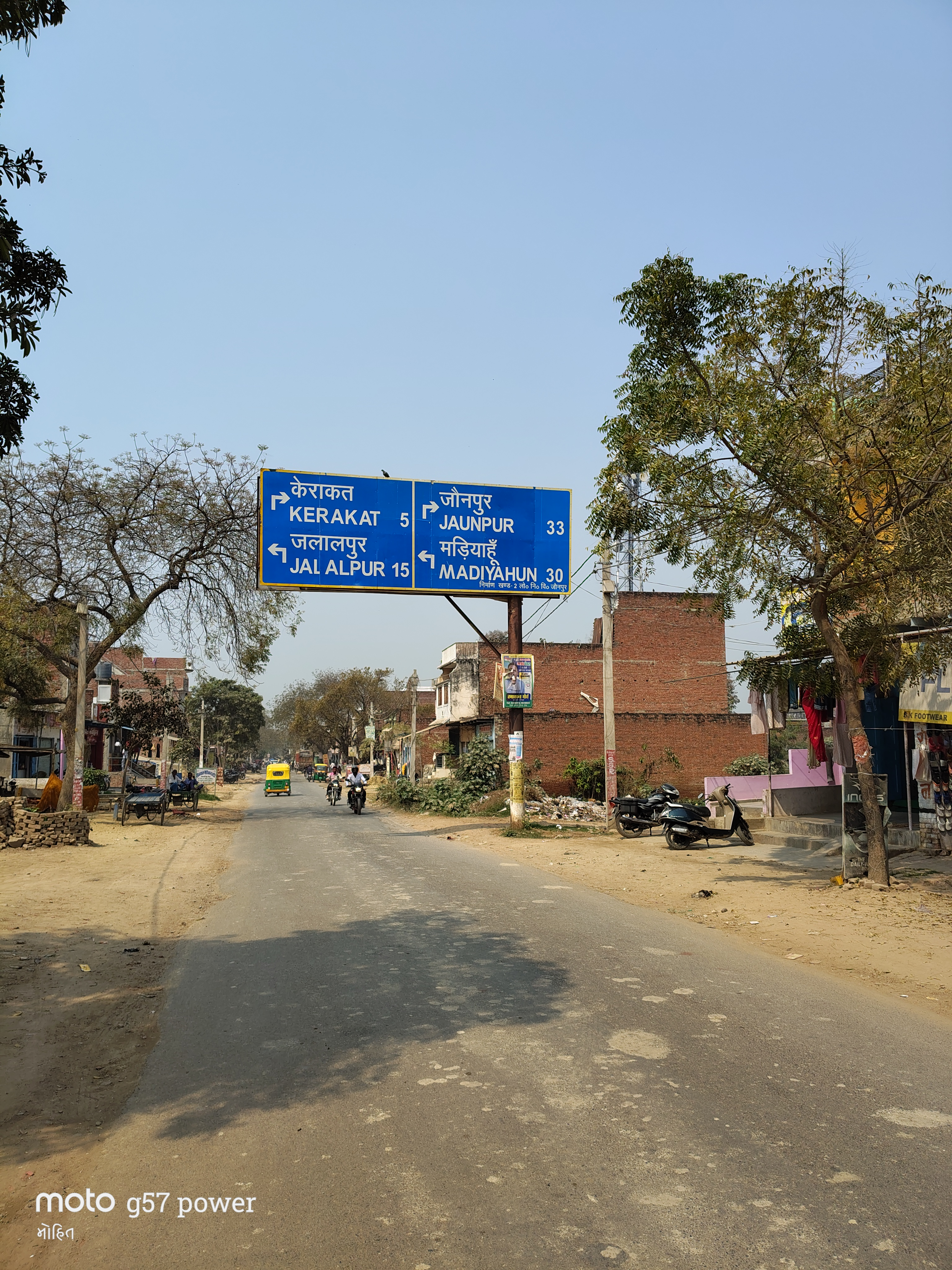
Government Signboard in Thanagaddi Bazar, reading Kerakat as the nearest big Town

Driving distance from Kerakat to the District headquarters Jaunpur is 30 km. Kerakat is also well connected by road to Varanasi, Azamgarh, Ghazipur and other cities of Uttar Pradesh.

A 4-lane highway has been proposed linking Varanasi to Ayodhya which will pass through Kerakat and Shahganj tehsil of Jaunpur.

=== Air ===
The closest major airport to Kerakat is Lal Bahadur Shastri Airport at Varanasi, 31 km by road. Another nearby airport is Azamgarh Airport.

== Education ==
- Shri Ganesh Rai Post Graduate College (SGRPGC)
- Public Inter College, Kerakat
- Green Valley English School
- There are 215+ Schools are available and 102+ College available.

== Notable people ==
- Ravi Kishan, an actor in Bhojpuri cinema and Bollywood, is from Kerakat. He has also worked in Tamil, Telugu, Kannada, Gujrati, English and other language films.

== See also ==
- Anapur
- Bhadehari
