= Mungra Badshahpur =

- Town
- Location in Uttar Pradesh, India Mungra Badshahpur (India)
- Coordinates: 25.65°N 82.18°E
- Country: India
- State: Uttar Pradesh
- District: Jaunpur

Government
  - Type: Municipal board

Area
  - Total: 9 km^{2} (3.5 sq mi)
  - Rank: 7
- Elevation: 403 m (1,322 ft)

Population (2011)
  - Total: 20,004
  - Density: 8,706.86/km^{2} (22,550.7/sq mi)

Language
  - Official: Hindi
  - Other: Awadhi
- Time zone: UTC+5:30 (IST)
- PIN: 222202
- Telephone code: 05454
- Vehicle registration: UP-62
- Sex ratio: 1 ♂/1.024♀

Population Growth
Year	Pop.	±%
1951	11,089	—
1961	13,070	+17.9%
1971	15,640	+19.7%
1981	18,060	+15.5%
1991	20,908	+15.8%
2001	23,980	+14.7%
2011	26,747	+11.5%
Source:Census of India

Mungra Badshahpur (also Mogra Badshahpur) is a town and a municipal board in Jaunpur district of Uttar Pradesh, India. It is situated 48 km north east of Allahabad city in the North-West part of Varanasi Division.

Mungra Badshahpur is home to the Sathariya Industrial Area, which houses several industries, including Hawkins Cookers Limited, PepsiCo, HIL, and many small-scale industries.

The town also has a number of hotels and guest houses for visitors, such as Bombay Guest House, Hotel Raj Residency, and Hotel Aditya.

Bombay Guest House is considered as the first and oldest hotel in Mungra Badshahpur

== Topography ==
Attitude varies from 261 ft to 290 ft. above M.S.L. (Mean Sea Level). The topography of the town is mainly a flat plain. The soil is mainly sandy, loamy and clayey. There is a paucity of minerals. Excavations at some places yield some rocks which are burnt to make lime. The lime obtained from sand and gravel is used in building construction work. The temperatures of the town lie between a minimum of 4.30C and a maximum of 44.60C. Average annual rainfall is 987 mm.

== Demographics ==
As of 2011 Indian Census, Mogra Badshahpur had a total population of 20,004, of which 10,300 were males and 9,704 were females. Population within the age group of 0 to 6 years was 2,713. The total number of literates in Mogra Badshahpur was 14,337, which constituted 71.7% of the population with male literacy of 77.4% and female literacy of 65.6%. The effective literacy rate of 7+ population of Mogra Badshahpur was 82.9%, of which male literacy rate was 89.7% and female literacy rate was 75.8%. The Scheduled Castes population was 1,650. Mogra Badshahpur had 3176 households in 2011.

== Economy ==
As of 2015 the economic development of the town is mainly dependent on agriculture. The chief cause of this is the absence of heavy industry in the town. Several industries are coming up along the Varanasi-Jaunpur highway. A cotton mill is operational near Karanja Kala. At Sathariya Industrial Development Area (SIDA), about 85 industrial units like M/s Raja Flour Mill, Pepsico India Holdings, Howkins Cookers Limited, Amit Oil and Vegetable, Chaudharana Steel Limit, Saurya Aluminium are running. The Animal Husbandry, a dairy unit is established. Three fourths of the population of the town is dependent on agriculture.

== Politics ==
Politics of Mungra Badshahpur is dominated by the Bhartiya Janta Party (BJP). Regional parties Bahujan Samajwadi Party (BSP) and Samajwadi Party (SP) also have presence.

== Places of interest ==
There are some historical sites and worth-seeing sights in the town. Maa Kali Dham is situated in the heart of the town. Other attractions include Daulatiya Hanuman and Manokamna Siddh Dakshin Mukhi Hanuman Hanumant Dham, Goraiyadih Vateswar Mahadev Mandir,

== Industry in mungra badshahpur ==
Mungra Badshahpur has Sathariya Industrial Area there is Hawkins Cooker Limited, Pepsi Co' Hil and many small industries.
