= Shahganj =

- Town
- Location in Uttar Pradesh, India Shahganj (India)
- Coordinates: 26.056°N 82.682°E
- Country: India
- State: Uttar Pradesh
- District: Jaunpur
- Named for: Shah baba

Government
  - MLA: Shri Ramesh Singh
- Elevation: 303 m (994 ft)

Population (2011)
  - Total: 26,556

Language
  - Official: Hindi
  - Additional official: Urdu
- Time zone: UTC+5:30 (IST)
- Postal code: 223101
- Vehicle registration: UP62
- Website: up.gov.in

Shahganj is a town and a municipal board in Jaunpur district in the Indian state of Uttar Pradesh.

== Demographics ==
As of 2011 Indian Census, Shahganj had a total population of 26,556, of which 13,812 were males and 12,744 were females. Population within the age group of 0 to 6 years was 3,534. The total number of literates in Shahganj was 19,686, which constituted 74.1% of the population with male literacy of 78.1% and female literacy of 69.9%. The effective literacy rate of 7+ population of Shahganj was 85.5%, of which male literacy rate was 90.0% and female literacy rate was 80.6%. The Scheduled Castes and Scheduled Tribes population was 9,584 and 2 respectively. Shahganj had 3936 households in 2011.

As of 2001 India census, Shahganj had a population of 24,595. Males constitute 51% of the population and females 49%. Shahganj has an average literacy rate of 59%, lower than the national average of 59.5%: male literacy is 61%, and female literacy is 57%.

Shahganj is famous for its Sita Sringar Mela which is a Bangle fair. Traders from different regions of the Purvanchal come for business in this fair.

== Economy ==
Ratna Sugar Mill, the first sugar mill of the Purvanchal region was located in Shahganj, which is closed now (due to recurring losses).

== See also ==
- Pattinarendrapur
- Shahganj Junction Railway Station
- Manikala
