= Jaunpur district =

District in Uttar Pradesh, India

Coordinates: 25°45′N 82°45′E

- District of Uttar Pradesh
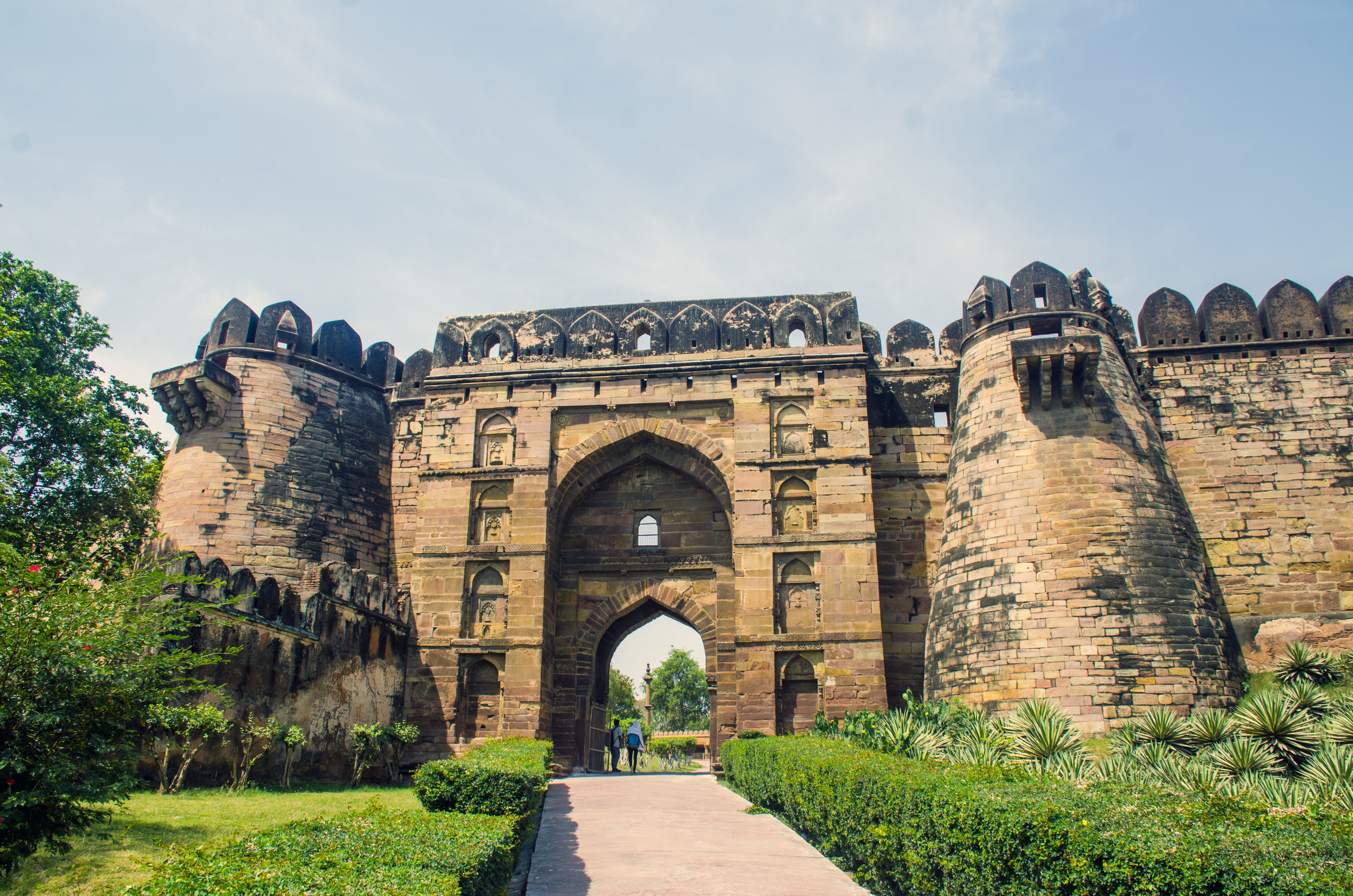
- Shahi Qila in Jaunpur

- Location of Jaunpur district in Uttar Pradesh
- Country: India
- State: Uttar Pradesh
- Division: Varanasi
- Established: 1359
- Headquarters: Jaunpur
- Tehsils: Badlapur; Jaunpur; Shahganj; Machhlishahr; Mariahu; Kerakat

Government
  - District Magistrate: Samuel Paul N.
  - Lok Sabha constituencies: Jaunpur • Machhlishahr
  - Member of Parliament, Lok Sabha: Babu Singh Kushwaha

Area
  - Total: 4,038 km^{2} (1,559 sq mi)

Population (2011)
  - Total: 4,494,204
  - Density: 1,113/km^{2} (2,883/sq mi)
  - Urban: 346,580

Demographics
  - Literacy: 73.66%
  - Sex ratio: 1018
  - Language: Hindi • Bhojpuri • Urdu • Awadhi
- Time zone: UTC+05:30 (IST)
- Vehicle registration: UP-62
- Average annual precipitation: 1098 mm
- Website: Official Website

Jaunpur district is a district in the Varanasi Division of the Indian state of Uttar Pradesh. The district headquarters is the city of Jaunpur which is situated on the banks of the Gomti River. It is located 228 km southeast of the state capital Lucknow. 65 km northwest of Varanasi and 732 km southeast of New Delhi. The district has two Lok Sabha seats and nine Vidhan Sabha seats. According to the 2011 census, Jaunpur has a gender ratio of 1,018 females to 1,000 males, the highest in Uttar Pradesh. The most commonly spoken language in the district is Hindi.

== Geography ==
The district of Jaunpur is situated in the northwest part of Varanasi Division. Its attitude varies from 261 ft to 290 ft above sea level.

=== Climate ===
Jaunpur district has a climate consistent with that of the Northern Plain and Central Highlands including the Aravalli Range, hot semi-arid eco-region 4.3 and hot dry ecoregion 9.2. The temperature varies between about 4 °C (39 °F) and 44 °C (111 °F). The annual normal rainfall is 1,098 millimetres (43.2 in). The monsoon season occurs from the third week of June to the first week of October. Normally, there are 46 rain days per year of which 31 occur in the monsoon season. The district regularly suffers drought and pestilence.

=== Topography ===
The Topography of the district is a flat plain undulating with shallow river valleys. The main permanently flowing rivers are the Gomti and the Sai. The rivers of Jaunpur flow from northwest to southeast and the land slopes in the same direction. Thus, there is a more elevated area in the northwest and a less elevated area of land in the southeast.

=== Rivers ===
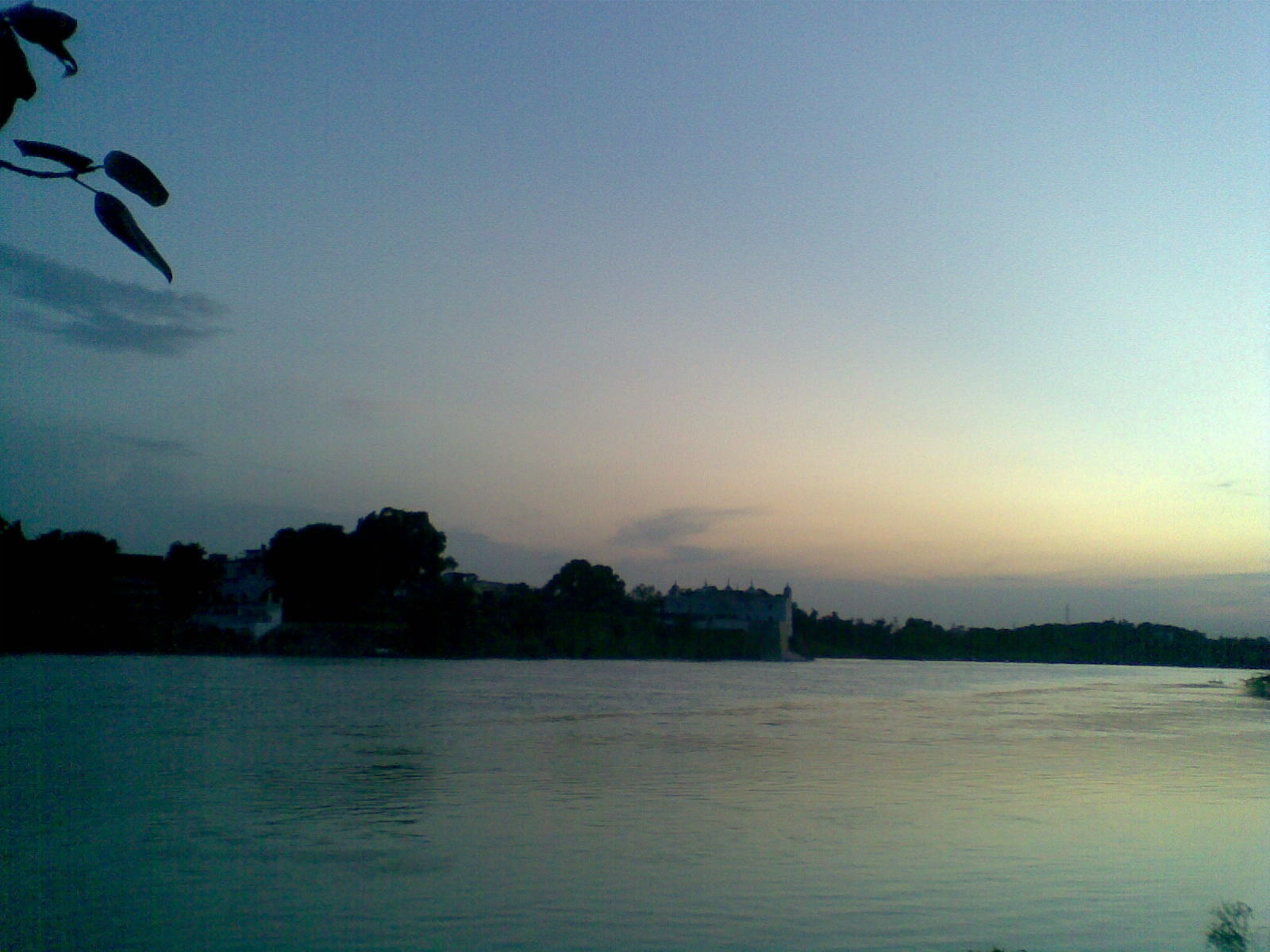
The banks of river Gomati in Jaunpur

Gomti and Sai are its main parental rivers. Besides these, Varuna, Basuhi, Pili. Mamur and Gangi are the smaller rivers here. The rivers Gomti and Basuhi divide the district into nearly four equal landmasses. Jaunpur district is often affected by the disaster of floods.

=== Geology ===
Beneath the surface of the district of Jaunpur, is a thick mantle consisting of the quaternary sediments (silt, sand and clay) of the Ganga river system. Below is Vindhya Range bedrock. Mineral deposits are rare but there is limestone as a conglomerate kanker in nodular and block forms. The limestone can be used in building. Earthquakes have been recorded, the largest in 1927 and 1954.

== Demographics ==
Historical population
Year	Pop.	±% p.a.
1901	1,201,667	—
1911	1,155,244	−0.39%
1921	1,153,633	−0.01%
1931	1,234,365	+0.68%
1941	1,385,490	+1.16%
1951	1,515,043	+0.90%
1961	1,727,264	+1.32%
1971	2,005,434	+1.50%
1981	2,532,734	+2.36%
1991	3,214,636	+2.41%
2001	3,911,679	+1.98%
2011	4,494,204	+1.40%

Religions in Jaunpur district (2011)
Religion	Percent
Hinduism	88.59%
Islam	10.76%
Other or not stated	0.65%

In 2011, an official census was made in Jaunpur district. It recorded a population of 4,494,204 of which 2,258,437 were female and 2,217,635 male making it 7th most populated district in whole state. Jaunpur district has population density of 1,113 persons per km^{2}. Between 2001 and 2011, the population of Jaunpur district grew 14.89%. Literacy increased from 59.84 to 73.66 per cent. In 2011, 86.06 per cent of men were literate and 61.7 per cent of women. Children under six years formed 14.37% of the population. 7.71% of the population lives in urban areas. Scheduled Castes made up 22.04% of the population.

Jaunpur ranks seventh in terms of population in the state and ranks first in terms of sex ratio (1,024). There are 663,513 households in the district accounting for 2% of the total households in the U.P. The average size of households in the district is 6.8 persons. Urban population in the district is only 7.7% of total population.

=== Languages ===
Languages of Jaunpur district (2011)
1. Hindi (92.7%)
2. Bhojpuri (3.58%)
3. Urdu (1.90%)
4. Awadhi (1.73%)
5. Others (0.14%)

At the time of the 2011 Census of India, 92.65% of the population in the district spoke Hindi, 3.58% Bhojpuri, 1.90% Urdu and 1.73% Awadhi as their first language.

== Culture ==
Jaunpur is located in the Purvanchal part of the Bhojpuri region of Uttar Pradesh. It is an important cultural centre for Bhojpuri music, with several popular Bhojpuri singers and composers belonging to the district.

The village of Chaukiya, near Jaunpur city, is notable for the temple of Shitala Debi, which is a popular pilgrimage site.

=== Festivals ===
Chhath Puja, also known as Dala Chhath or Surya Shashti, is celebrated across Jaunpur district. In Jaunpur city, major celebrations take place along the ghats of the Gomti River, where devotees gather to offer arghya to the setting and rising Sun.

Across the district, Chhath is observed along the Gomti, Sai and Pili rivers and at other water bodies. Particularly prominent celebrations take place across Jaunpur Sadar, Kerakat, Shahganj and Madiyahu tehsils. Devotees perform the rituals and sing songs dedicated to Chhathi Maiya.

== Governance ==
=== Divisions ===
Within the district, there are two national lower house constituencies, Lok Sabha, of which Jaunpur constituency is entirely in the district, and nine state lower house constituencies, Vidhan Sabha. Jaunpur district has six administrative subdivisions (Tahsils).

==== Tahsils ====
- Shahganj
- Badlapur
- Machhali Shahar
- Jaunpur
- Mariahu
- Kerakat.

==== Development Blocks ====
Jaunpur district is further divided into twenty-one "development blocks".

- Sondhi (Shahganj)
- Suithakala
- Khuthan
- Karanja Kala
- Badlapur
- Maharajganj
- Sujanganj
- Baksha
- Mungra Badshahpur
- Machhali Shahar
- Mariahu
- Barsathi
- Rampur
- Ramnagar
- Jalalpur
- Kerakat
- Dobhi
- Muftiganj
- Dharmapur
- Bijor
- Sirkoni

==== Thanas ====
There are also twenty-six police districts (Thanas).

- Kotwali
- Sadar
- Line Bazar
- Zafarabad
- KhetaSarai
- Shahganj
- Sarpatahan
- Kerakat
- Chandwak
- Jalalpur
- Sarai Khwaja
- Gaura Badshahpur
- Badlapur
- Khuthan
- Singramau
- Baksha
- Sujanganj
- Maharajganj
- Mungra Badshahpur
- Pawara
- Machhlishahr
- Meerganj
- Sikrara
- Mariahu
- Rampur
- Barsathi
- Nevadhiya
- Sureri
- Baserawan
- Kaserawan
- Janghai

== Notable sites ==
=== Shahi Qila ===
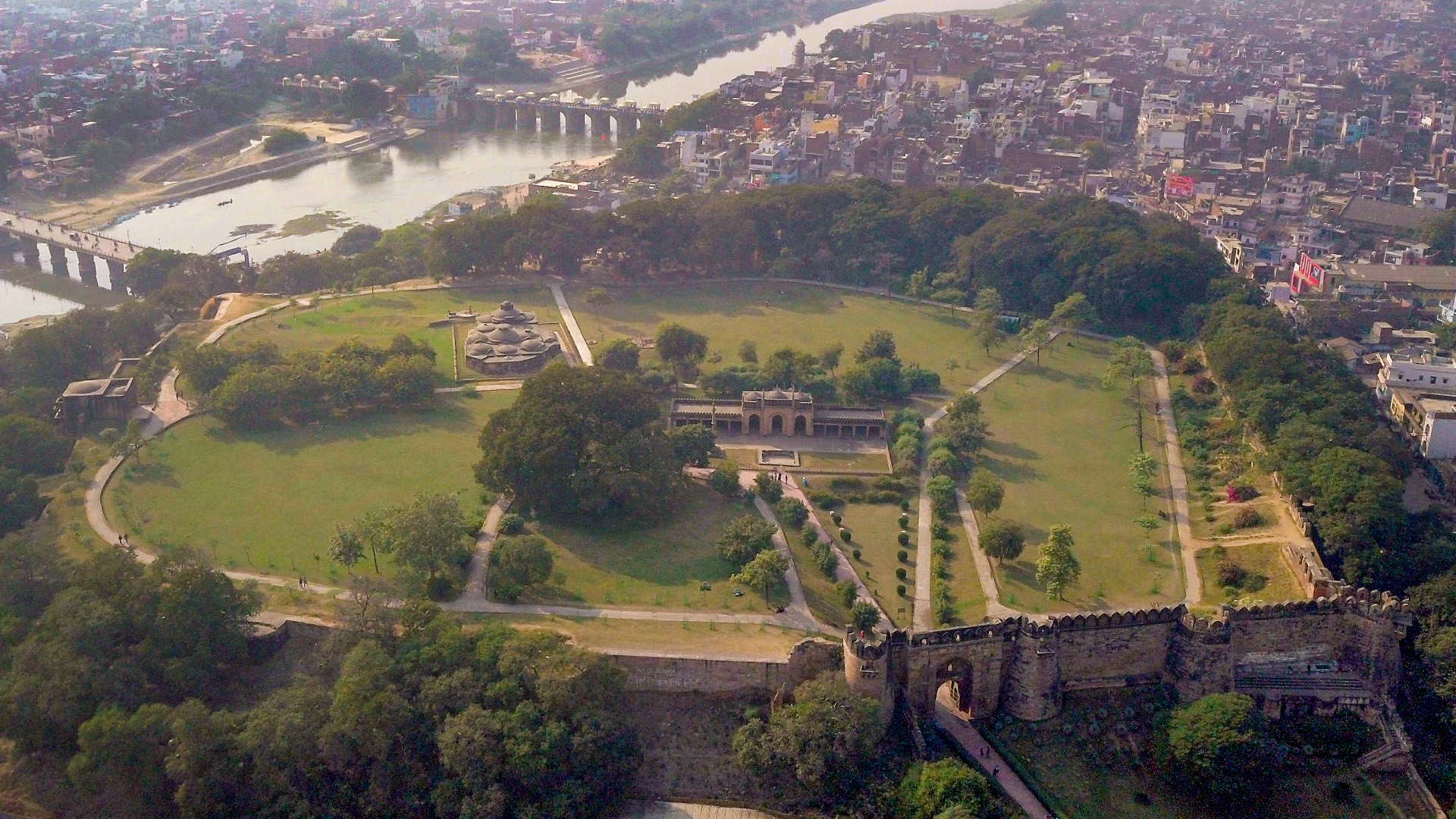
Shahi Qila on banks of Gomti Aerial View

In 1462, Firoz Shah III built the Shahi Qila (the imperial fort). The Kerar Kot fort once stood on the same site in Jaunpur township on the north bank of the Gomti River. It contained a mosque and a spacious and stylish set of baths (hammam) installed by Ibrahim, Firoz's brother. The layout of the fort is an irregular quadrangle enclosed in stone walls. The walls surround raised earthworks. Most of the remains of the original structures are buried or in ruin.

The main gates face east. The largest inner gate is 14 metres (46 ft) in height. Its external surface is set with ashlar stone. A further, outer, gate was installed during the reign of the Mughal king, Akbar, under the patronage of the governor of Jaunpur, Min'im Khan in the 16th century. It is designed in the shape of a flanking bastion. The spandrels or spaces between the arches of the outer gate were decorated with blue and yellow tiles. Ornamental niches are built into the walls of the outer gate. The two-story residential and administrative building or "palace" was built in a square layout. An interior pillared verandah or aiwan overlooked the ground floor from the first..

=== Atala Masjid ===
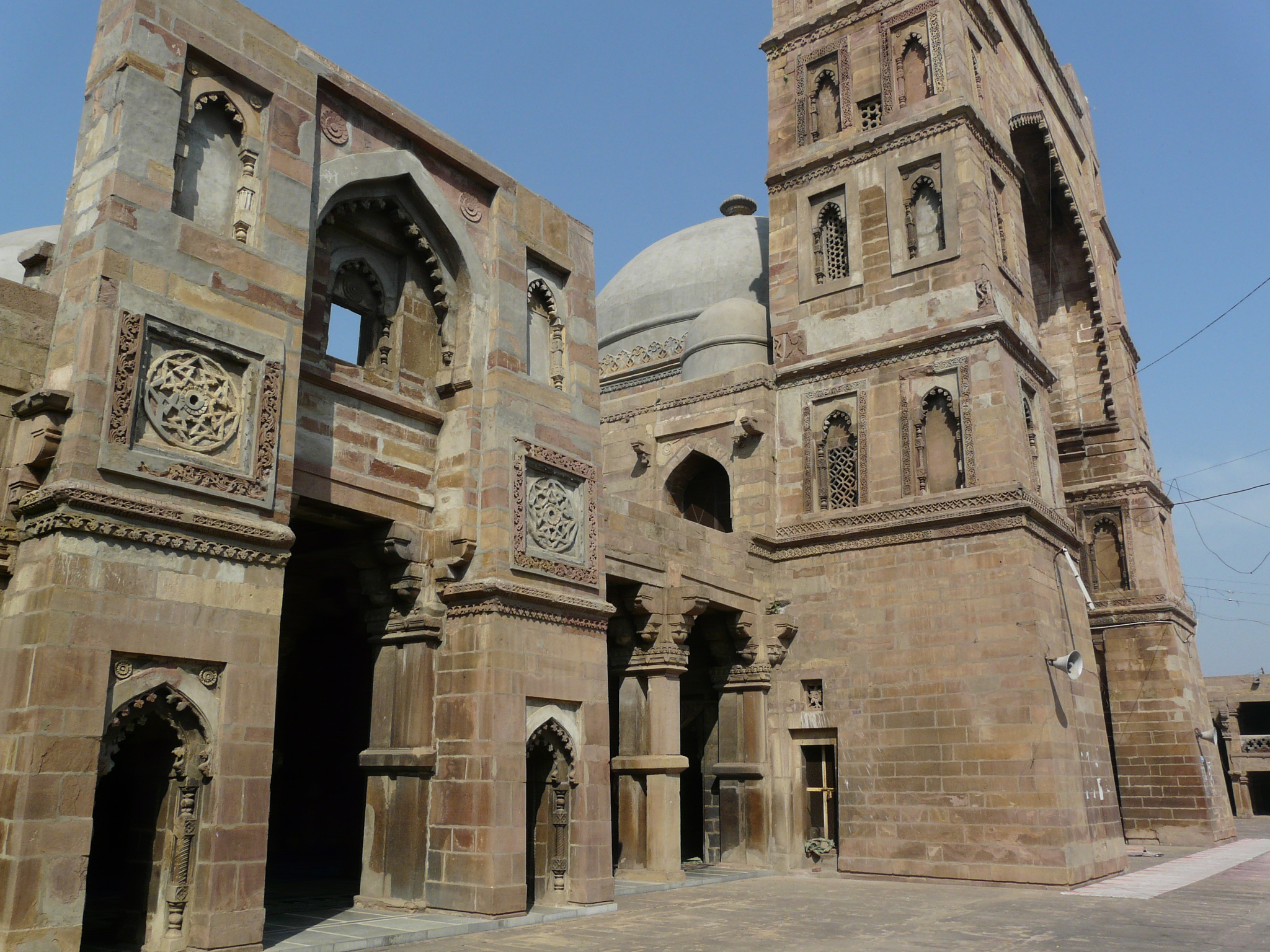
Main pishtaq leading into the iwan of Atala Masjid

Firoz Shah III began the construction of the Atala Masjid in 1393. The Atala masjid is model of Indo-Iran architecture. The Atala became a model for other Masjids in the Jaunpur district. Architecturally, it retained and advanced the element of monumentalism. The height of the Atala masjid is over 100 feet (30 m). The perimeter is 248 feet (76 m). The entrance has three massive stone pylons. The central one consists of a high arch between two sloping towers. These are decorated with arched niches and stone screened windows.

=== Jhanjhari Masjid ===
The Jhanjhari Masjid, on the north bank of the Gomti River, was built by Ibrahim in the Sipah locality of Jaunpur township. It was a residence of Ibrahim himself, as well as a place for saints, scholars (pandits) and the army (who kept animals such as elephants, camels, horses and mules). After human destruction and flood damage, only the facade remains. This consists of an arch, 35 feet (11 m) high and 32 feet (9.8 m) wide. Some of the stones from this masjid were used in the construction of the Shahi bridge.

=== Masjid Jama ash Sharq (Jama Masjid) ===
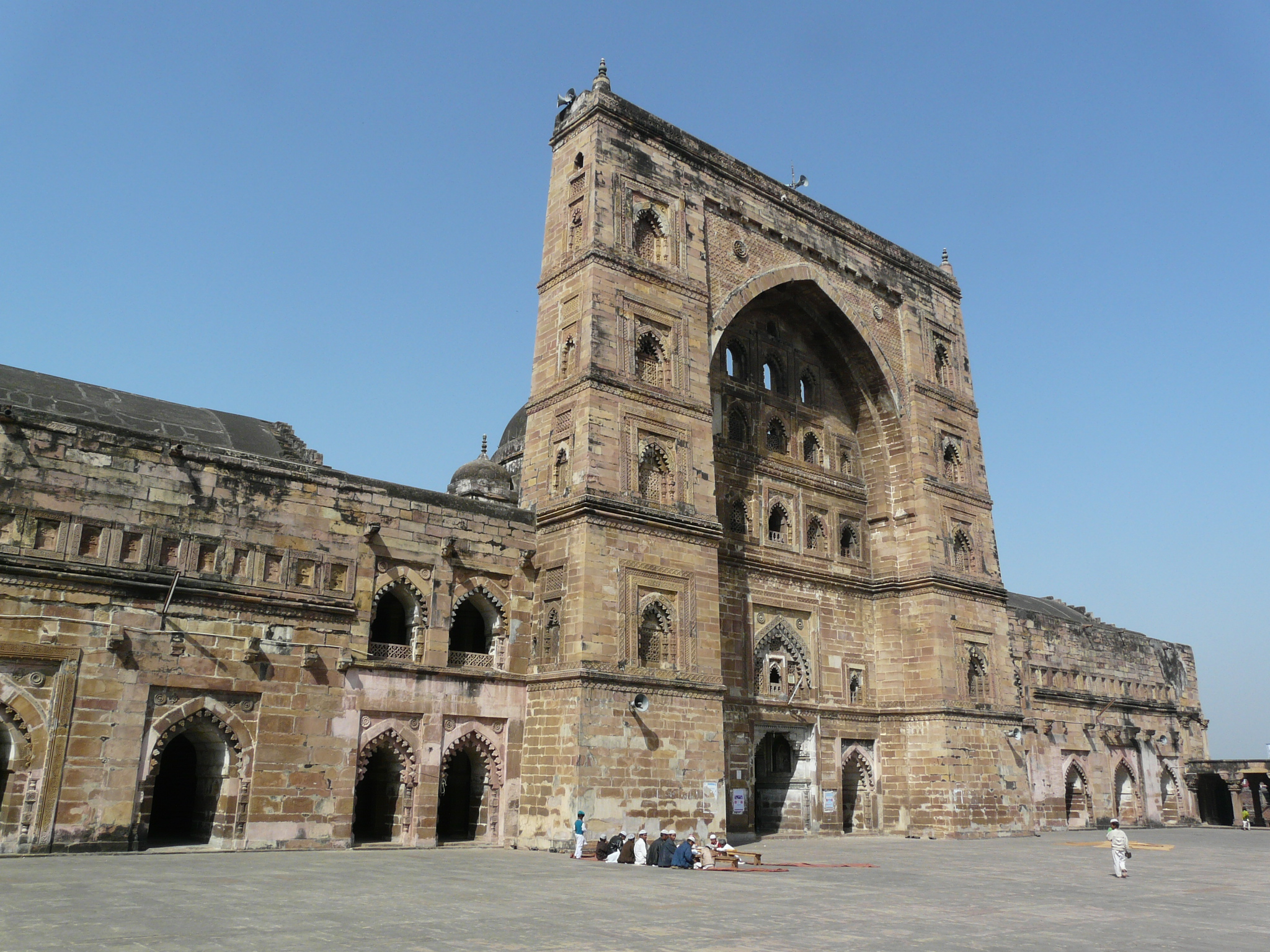
Main arcade facade, Jama Masjid

The Jama Masjid is from the Sharqi dynasty period, started by Ibrahim Shah Sharqi and completed by Hussain Shah. It is located on the Shahganj road near the Purani bazaar in Jaunpur City. The size of the masjid interior is 219 feet (67 m) x 217 feet (66 m). 27 steps climb to the top. There are four gates, one at each cardinal point. The eastern gateway was destroyed by Sikander Lodhi. The masjid is decorated with Egyptian style engravings and lotus, sunflower and rose motifs.

== Notable people ==
- Hasan Abidi — Pakistani journalist, writer, political activist, trade unionist and Urdu poet
- Munna Bajrangi — Indian gangster and politician associated with organised crime in eastern Uttar Pradesh.
- Banarasidas — 17th-century Jain poet and author of the autobiographical work Ardhakathanaka.
- Sharadindu Bandyopadhyay - Indian Bengali language writer and script writer in Bollywood. Creator of the famous detective character Byomkesh Bakshi and also huge number of historical fiction novels and short stories in Bengali language.
- Ashok Bhushan - Judge at the Supreme Court of India and was 31st Chief Justice of Kerala High Court
- Banke Chamar (1820–1857), freedom fighter who participated in the Indian Rebellion of 1857.
- Yadavendra Dutt Dubey — Indian politician and former Member of Parliament who also served in the Uttar Pradesh Legislative Assembly.
- Syed Wazir Hasan — jurist, politician, former Chief Justice of the Awadh Chief Court and President of the All-India Muslim League
- Abdul Awwal Jaunpuri — Indian Islamic scholar and religious figure associated with the Islamic scholarly tradition of Jaunpur.
- Abdul Batin Jaunpuri — Indian Islamic scholar, author, religious preacher and educationist who was born in Jaunpur.
- Abdur Rab Jaunpuri - Indian Muslim scholar and religious leader.
- Karamat Ali Jaunpuri - 19-century Islamic social reformer and founder of the Taiyuni movement
- Majid Ali Jaunpuri - Indian Sunni Islamic scholar and a rationalist thinker
- Muhammad Jaunpuri — Islamic religious leader and founder of the Mahdavia movement
- Muhammad Yunus Jawnpuri, Indian hadith scholar and former Shaykh al-Hadith of Mazahir Uloom, Saharanpur.
- Mulla Mahmud Jaunpuri — 17th-century Indian natural philosopher, astronomer and philosopher, known for his work Shams-e-Bazeghi and his writings on astronomy and natural philosophy.
- Syed Rashid Ahmed Jaunpuri — Indian Sufi saint, Islamic scholar, author and missionary who was born in Jaunpur.
- Nadeem Javed - Indian politician, former member of Uttar Pradesh Legislative Assembly
- Sunit Kumar — Indian Police Service officer who served as Director General of Police of Bihar and held several senior positions in the Bihar police administration.
- Ravi Kishan — Indian actor, television personality and politician who represents Gorakhpur in the Lok Sabha. His family hails from Kerakat in Jaunpur district, where he lived for several years.
- Shailendra Yadav Lalai - MLA Shahganj and former minister of Uttar Pradesh Government
- Mohammad Akram Nadwi - Dean faculty of Islamic studies Oxford University London
- Dinesh Kunwar Patel, developer of world's first homemade humanoid Robot "Shalu" that can speak 47 languages
- Sushma Patel — Indian politician and former member of the Uttar Pradesh Legislative Assembly from Mungra Badshahpur.
- Krishna Pratap — Indian politician and former Member of Parliament from the Jaunpur constituency who served in the 16th Lok Sabha.
- Acharya Ramamurti - Indian social activist (Gandhian) and educationist
- Rambhadracharya - Hindu spiritual leader, poet, commentator, educationist, religious and social figure
- Urvashi Rai — Indian film actress.
- Tribhuvan Ram — Indian engineer and politician who served as a member of the Uttar Pradesh Legislative Assembly.
- Shakeel Ahmed Samdani — Indian academic and lawyer
- Tufani Saroj - Former Member of Parliament Machhlishahr
- Malik Sarwar — founder and first Sultan of the Jaunpur Sultanate and founder of the Sharqi dynasty, ruling from 1394 to 1399.
- Ibrahim Shah Sharqi — third Sultan of Jaunpur, whose reign saw the sultanate reach its greatest extent and Jaunpur develop as a major centre of learning and culture.
- Mahmud Shah Sharqi — fourth Sultan of Jaunpur, who ruled from 1440 to 1457 and was born in Jaunpur.
- Husain Shah Sharqi — sixth and last Sultan of Jaunpur, who ruled from 1458 to 1479 and was a patron of art and music.
- Rasheed Ahmad Siddiqui — Indian Urdu writer, humorist and satirist, born in Mariyahu, Jaunpur. He was a professor and head of the Urdu Department at Aligarh Muslim University and received the Sahitya Akademi Award in 1971.
- Dhananjay Singh — Indian politician and former Member of Parliament from Jaunpur who also served in the Uttar Pradesh Legislative Assembly.
- Harivansh Singh — Indian politician and former Member of Parliament from Pratapgarh.
- Kripashankar Singh — Indian politician and former minister in the Maharashtra government.
- Indu Prakash Singh - Philosopher, economist, politician and former diplomat with the Indian Foreign Service
- Lalji Singh - Scientist who worked in the field of DNA fingerprinting technology
- Jagdish Sonkar — Indian politician and former member of the Uttar Pradesh Legislative Assembly.
- Shah Muhammad Sulaiman — jurist, mathematician, scientist, former Chief Justice of the Allahabad High Court and Vice-Chancellor of Aligarh Muslim University
- Rajesh Vivek - Actor
- Gaurav Yadav — Indian police officer who served as Director General of Police of Punjab.
- Girish Chandra Yadav — Indian politician and member of the Uttar Pradesh Legislative Assembly.
- Jagmohan Yadav - Former IPS police officer and former Director-General of Uttar Pradesh Police
- Lucky Yadav - MLA of Uttar Pradesh Government
- Shyam Singh Yadav — Indian politician, former Member of Parliament from Jaunpur and former civil servant who also represented India in international shooting competitions and coached the Indian shooting team.
- Surendra Kumar Yadav - Special Judge in Demolition of the Babri Masjid case
- Parasnath Yadava - Former MP and former Cabinet minister of Uttar Pradesh Government
- Sajjad Zaheer — Indian Urdu writer, Marxist thinker and revolutionary, and founder of the Progressive Writers' Movement. He belonged to the family of Syed Wazir Hasan of Jaunpur.
- Syed Ali Zaheer — Indian lawyer and politician who served as India's ambassador to Iran and as a minister in Uttar Pradesh. He belonged to the family of Syed Wazir Hasan of Jaunpur.
