= 2019 Indian general election in Uttar Pradesh =

Indian lower house election in UP state

- 11, 18, 23, 29 April 2019; 6, 12, 19 May 2019

80 seats
- Turnout: 59.21% (▲0.77 pp)
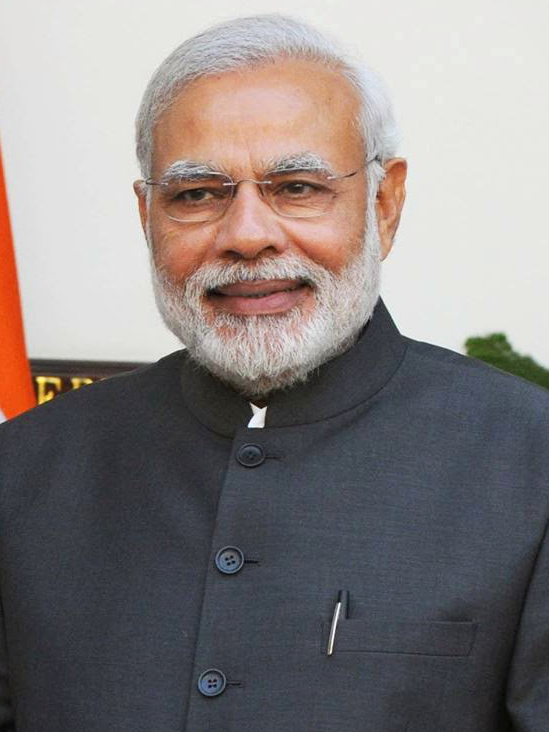

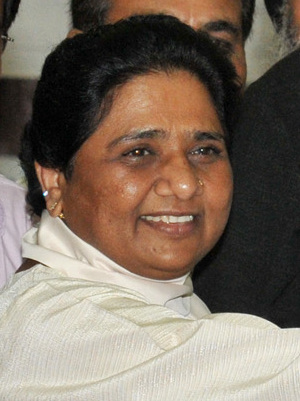

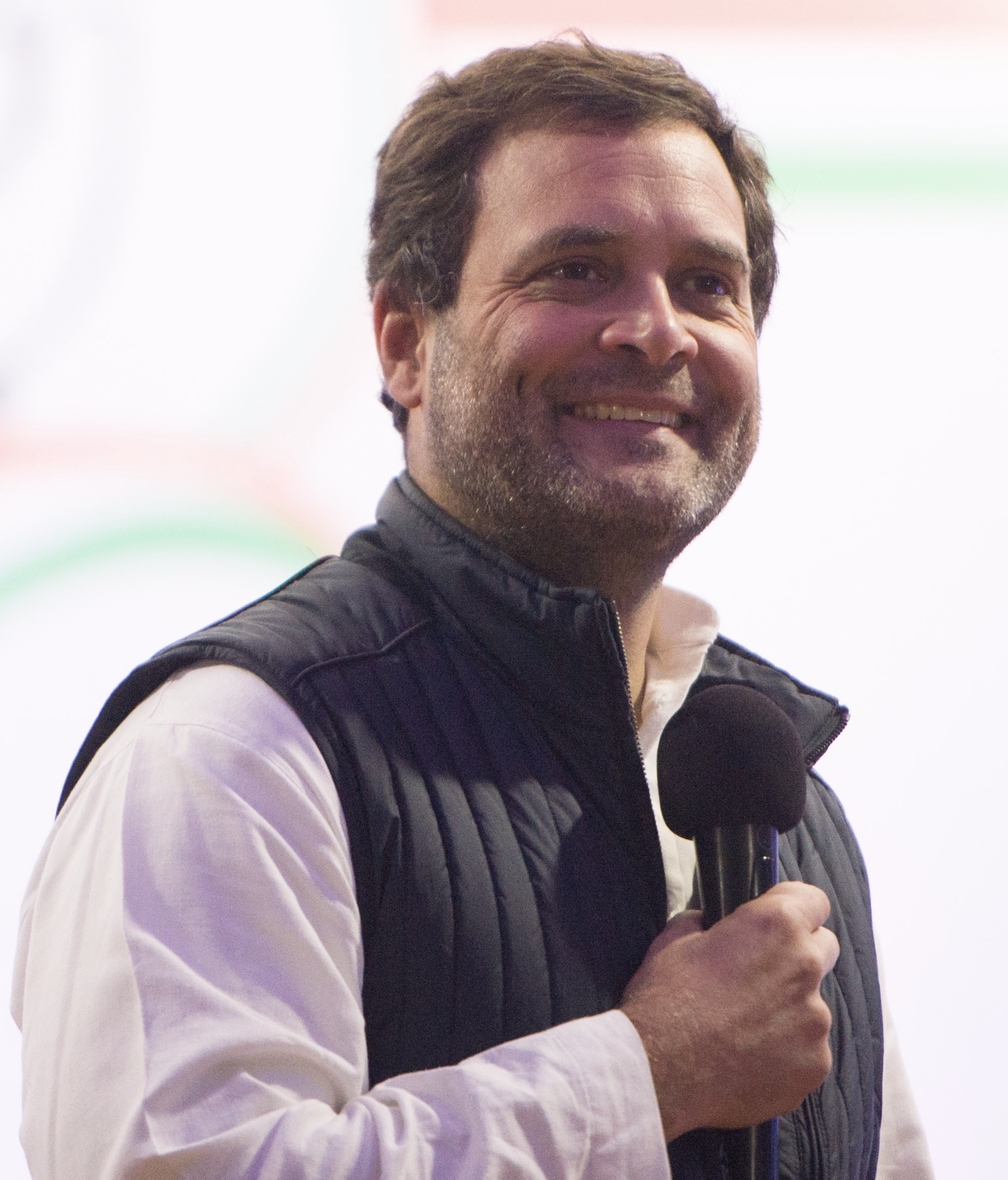
	First party	Second party
Leader	Narendra Modi	Mayawati
Party	BJP	BSP
Alliance	NDA	MGB
Leader's seat	Varanasi (won)	Did Not Contest
Last election	71	0
Seats won	62	10
Seat change	▼9	▲10
Popular vote	42,858,171	16,659,754
Percentage	50.67%	19.13%
Swing	▲7.95 pp	▼0.54 pp
	Third party	Fourth party
Leader	Dimple Yadav	Rahul Gandhi
Party	SP	INC
Alliance	MGB	UPA
Leader's seat	Kannauj (lost); Mainpuri (by- elected)	Amethi (lost)
Last election	5	2
Seats won	5	1
Seat change	No Change	▼1
Popular vote	15,533,620	5,457,269
Percentage	18.03%	6.36%
Swing	▼4.33 pp	▼1.17 pp
- Seatwise Result Map of the 2019 general election in Uttar Pradesh
Prime Minister before election
Narendra Modi
BJP
Prime Minister after election
Narendra Modi
BJP

The 2019 Indian general election in Uttar Pradesh was held between 11 April and 19 May 2019 to constitute the 17th Lok Sabha. The election results were declared on 23 May which saw the BJP led alliance winning majority of seats.

== Election schedule ==
Poll event	Phase						
Poll event	I	II	III	IV	V	VI	VII
Notification date	18 March	19 March	28 March	2 April	10 April	16 April	22 April
Last date for filing nomination	25 March	26 March	4 April	9 April	18 April	23 April	29 April
Scrutiny of nomination	26 March	27 March	5 April	10 April	20 April	24 April	30 April
Last date for withdrawal of nomination	28 March	29 March	8 April	12 April	22 April	26 April	2 May
Date of poll	11 April	18 April	23 April	29 April	6 May	12 May	19 May
Date of counting of votes/result	23 May 2019						
No. of constituencies	8	8	10	13	14	14	13

== Parties and alliances ==
=== National Democratic Alliance ===
National Democratic Alliance
Party	Flag	Symbol	Leader	Seats
Bharatiya Janata Party			Narendra Modi	78
Apna Dal (Sonelal)			Anupriya Patel	2
Total				80

The National Democratic Alliance (NDA), led by the Bharatiya Janata Party (BJP), contested 78 of the 80 seats in Uttar Pradesh in the 2019 Lok Sabha election, leaving two seats for its ally Apna Dal (Sonelal).

Under the seat-sharing arrangement, Anupriya Patel contested from Mirzapur, while the second seat was allotted to Robertsganj. Anupriya Patel retained the Mirzapur seat with a margin of over 200,000 votes, while the alliance fielded Pakodi Lal Kol from Robertsganj.

=== Mahagathbandhan (Uttar Pradesh) ===
Mahagathbandhan seat share for 2019 Lok Sabha Election in Uttar Pradesh.

Mahagathbandhan (Uttar Pradesh)
Party	Flag	Symbol	Leader	Seats
Bahujan Samaj Party			Mayawati	38
Samajwadi Party			Akhilesh Yadav	37
Rashtriya Lok Dal			Ajit Singh	3
Total				78

The Samajwadi Party (SP), Bahujan Samaj Party (BSP), and Rashtriya Lok Dal (RLD) formed a pre-poll alliance in Uttar Pradesh for the 2019 Indian general election to consolidate anti-Bharatiya Janata Party (BJP) votes in the state. The alliance was formally announced on 12 January 2019 by SP president Akhilesh Yadav and BSP chief Mayawati, marking the first major electoral partnership between the two parties since 1993.

Under the seat-sharing agreement, the BSP contested 38 constituencies, the SP 37, and the RLD 3, while the alliance did not field candidates in Amethi and Raebareli, leaving those seats for the Indian National Congress.

The alliance sought to combine the SP's support among Yadavs and Muslims, the BSP's Dalit vote base, and the RLD's influence among Jat voters, particularly in western Uttar Pradesh. Although the alliance succeeded in winning several constituencies in western Uttar Pradesh and increased the BSP's representation in the Lok Sabha, it failed to prevent the BJP-led NDA from retaining its dominance in the state. The BSP won 10 seats, the SP won 5 seats, and the RLD failed to win any seat, while the BJP-led NDA secured 64 of the state's 80 constituencies.

=== United Progressive Alliance ===
UPA Alliance seat share for 2019 Lok Sabha Election in Uttar Pradesh.

United Progressive Alliance
Party	Flag	Symbol	Leader	Seats
Indian National Congress			Ajay Rai	67
Jan Adhikar Party			Babu Singh Kushwaha	3
Total				70

The Indian National Congress contested the election independently in Uttar Pradesh after being excluded from the Samajwadi Party–Bahujan Samaj Party–Rashtriya Lok Dal alliance. Although the party initially announced that it would contest all 80 constituencies, it later decided not to field candidates in several seats contested by prominent alliance leaders, including Mulayam Singh Yadav in Mainpuri, Akhilesh Yadav in Kannauj, Dharmendra Yadav in Firozabad, Mayawati, Ajit Singh, and Jayant Chaudhary, describing the move as a "friendly contest" against the alliance.

The Congress also entered into electoral arrangements with smaller parties. It allotted three constituencies to the Jan Adhikar Party led by Babu Singh Kushwaha, while the Mahan Dal contested on the Congress symbol under an electoral understanding. In addition, the party announced that it would not contest the Gonda and Pilibhit seats, which were left for Apna Dal.

== Opinion poll ==
Date published	Polling agency				Lead
Date published	Polling agency	NDA	UPA	MGB	Lead
8 April 2019	News Nation	37	2	41	4
6 April 2019	India TV – CNX	41	4	35	6
3 April 2019	ABP News – Nielsen	36	2	42	6
1 April 2019	India TV – CNX	46	4	30	16
19 March 2019	Times Now – VMR	42	2	36	6
12 March 2019	News Nation	35	2	43	8
8 March 2019	India TV – CNX	41	4	35	6
31 Jan 2019	Times Now – VMR	27	2	51	24
24 Jan 2019	ABP News – Cvoter	25	4	51	26
23 Jan 2019	India Today	18	4	58	40
2 Nov 2018	ABP News – CVoter	31	5	44	13
5 Oct 2018	ABP News- CSDS	36	2	42	6

Date published	Polling agency				Lead
Date published	Polling agency	NDA	UPA	MGB	Lead
Jan 2019	Republic TV – CVoter	35.5%	17.3%	40.9%	5.4%

== Candidates ==
Constituency		NDA		MGB		UPA	
#	Name	Party	Candidate	Party	Candidate	Party	Candidate
1	Saharanpur	BJP	Raghav Lakhanpal	BSP	Haji Fazlur Rehman	INC	Imran Masood
2	Kairana	BJP	Pradeep Choudhary	SP	Tabassum Hasan	INC	Harendra Singh Malik
3	Muzaffarnagar	BJP	Sanjeev Balyan	RLD	Ajit Singh	(Note: Congress party decided not to field candidates in ten constituencies in Uttar Pradesh to support the SP-BSP-RLD alliance, a reciprocal gesture for the alliance leaving Amethi and Rae Bareli vacant for Rahul Gandhi and Sonia Gandhi.)	
4	Bijnor	BJP	Bharatendra Singh	BSP	Malook Nagar	INC	Nasimuddin Siddiqui
5	Nagina	BJP	Yashwant Singh	BSP	Girish Chandra	INC	Omvati Devi
6	Moradabad	BJP	Sarvesh Kumar Singh	SP	S. T. Hasan	INC	Imran Pratapgarhi
7	Rampur	BJP	Jaya Prada	SP	Mohammad Azam Khan	INC	Sanjay Kapoor
8	Sambhal	BJP	Parmeshwar Lal Saini	SP	Shafiqur Rahman Barq	INC	Major Jagat Pal Singh
9	Amroha	BJP	Kanwar Singh Tanwar	BSP	Kunwar Danish Ali	INC	Sachin Chaudhary
10	Meerut	BJP	Rajendra Agarwal	BSP	Haji Yaqoob Qureshi	INC	Harendra Agarwal
11	Baghpat	BJP	Satya Pal Singh	RLD	Jayant Chaudhary		
12	Ghaziabad	BJP	Vijay Kumar Singh	SP	Suresh Bansal	INC	Dolly Sharma
13	G. B. Nagar	BJP	Mahesh Sharma	BSP	Satveer Nagar	INC	Dr. Arvind Kumar Singh
14	Bulandshahr	BJP	Bhola Singh	BSP	Yogesh Verma	INC	Banshi Singh
15	Aligarh	BJP	Satish Kumar Gautam	BSP	Ajeet Baliyan	INC	Bijendra Singh
16	Hathras	BJP	Rajvir Singh Diler	SP	Ram Ji Lal Suman	INC	Triloki Ram
17	Mathura	BJP	Hema Malini	RLD	Kn. Narendra Singh	INC	Mahesh Pathak
18	Agra	BJP	S. P. Singh Baghel	BSP	Manoj Kumar Soni	INC	Preeta Harit
19	Fatehpur Sikri	BJP	Rajkumar Chahar	BSP	Shribhagwan Sharma	INC	Raj Babbar
20	Firozabad	BJP	Chandrasen Jadon	SP	Akshay Yadav		
21	Mainpuri	BJP	Prem Singh Shakya	SP	Mulayam Singh Yadav		
22	Etah	BJP	Rajveer Singh	SP	Devendra Singh Yadav	JAP	Suraj Singh
23	Badaun	BJP	Sanghmitra Maurya	SP	Dharmendra Yadav	INC	Saleem Iqbal Shervani
24	Aonla	BJP	Dharmendra Kumar	BSP	Ruchi Veera	INC	Kunwar Sarvraj Singh
25	Bareilly	BJP	Santosh Gangwar	SP	Bhagwat Gangwar	INC	Praveen Singh Aron
26	Pilibhit	BJP	Feroze Varun Gandhi	SP	Hemraj Verma		
27	Shahjahanpur	BJP	Arun Kumar Sagar	BSP	Amar Chandra Jauhar	INC	Brahm Swaroop Sagar
28	Kheri	BJP	Ajay Mishra Teni	SP	Purvi Verma	INC	Zafar Ali Naqvi
29	Dhaurahra	BJP	Rekha Verma	BSP	Arshad Ilyas Siddiqui	INC	Jitin Prasada
30	Sitapur	BJP	Rajesh Verma	BSP	Nakul Dubey	INC	Kaiser Jahan
31	Hardoi	BJP	Jai Prakash	SP	Usha Verma	INC	Virendra Kumar
32	Misrikh	BJP	Ashok Kumar Rawat	BSP	Neelu Satyarthi	INC	Manjari Rahi
33	Unnao	BJP	Sakshi Maharaj	SP	Arun Shankar Shukla	INC	Annu Tandon
34	Mohanlalganj	BJP	Kaushal Kishore	BSP	C. L. Verma	INC	R. K. Chaudhary
35	Lucknow	BJP	Rajnath Singh	SP	Poonam Sinha	INC	Acharya P. Krishnam
36	Rae Bareli	BJP	Dinesh Pratap Singh	(Note: The Samajwadi Party (SP) and the Bahujan Samaj Party (BSP) alliance agreed not to field candidates in Amethi and Rae Bareli, thereby supporting Congress candidates Rahul Gandhi and Sonia Gandhi, respectively.)		INC	Sonia Gandhi
37	Amethi	BJP	Smriti Irani	(Note: The Samajwadi Party (SP) and the Bahujan Samaj Party (BSP) alliance agreed not to field candidates in Amethi and Rae Bareli, thereby supporting Congress candidates Rahul Gandhi and Sonia Gandhi, respectively.)		INC	Rahul Gandhi
38	Sultanpur	BJP	Maneka Gandhi	BSP	Chandra Bhadra Singh	INC	Sanjaya Sinh
39	Pratapgarh	BJP	Sangam Lal Gupta	BSP	Ashok Kumar Tripathi	INC	Ratna Singh
40	Farrukhabad	BJP	Mukesh Rajput	BSP	Manoj Agarwal	INC	Salman Khurshid
41	Etawah	BJP	Ram Shankar Katheria	SP	Kamlesh Katheria	INC	Ashok Kumar Doharey
42	Kannauj	BJP	Subrat Pathak	SP	Dimple Yadav		
43	Kanpur	BJP	Satyadev Pachauri	SP	Ram Kumar	INC	Sriprakash Jaiswal
44	Akbarpur	BJP	Devendra Singh	BSP	Nisha Sachan	INC	Raja Ram Pal
45	Jalaun	BJP	Bhanu Pratap Singh	BSP	Ajay Singh	INC	Brijlal Khabri
46	Jhansi	BJP	Anurag Sharma	SP	Shyam Sundar Yadav	INC	Shiv Sharan Kushwaha
47	Hamirpur	BJP	Pushpendra Chandel	BSP	Dilip Kumar Singh	INC	Pritam Singh Lodhi
48	Banda	BJP	R. K. Singh Patel	SP	Shyama Charan Gupta	INC	Bal Kumar Patel
49	Fatehpur	BJP	Niranjan Jyoti	BSP	Sukhdev Prasad Verma	INC	Rakesh Sachan
50	Kaushambi	BJP	Vinod Sonkar	SP	Indrajit Saroj	INC	Girish Chandra Pasi
51	Phulpur	BJP	Keshari Devi Patel	SP	Pandhari Yadav	INC	Pankaj Patel
52	Allahabad	BJP	Rita Bahuguna Joshi	SP	Rajendra Singh Patel	INC	Yogesh Shukla
53	Barabanki	BJP	Upendra Singh Rawat	SP	Ram Sagar Rawat	INC	Tanuj Punia
54	Faizabad	BJP	Lallu Singh	SP	Anand Sen Yadav	INC	Dr. Nirmal Khatri
55	Ambedkar Nagar	BJP	Mukut Bihari	BSP	Ritesh Pandey		
56	Bahraich	BJP	Akshaibar Lal	SP	Shabbir Ahmad	INC	Savitri Bai Phule
57	Kaiserganj	BJP	Brij Bhushan Singh	BSP	Chandradev Ram Yadav	INC	Vinay Kumar Pandey
58	Shrawasti	BJP	Daddan Mishra	BSP	Ram Shiromani Verma	INC	Dhirendra Pratap Singh
59	Gonda	BJP	Kirti Vardhan Singh	SP	Vinod Singh	INC	Krishna Patel
60	Domariaganj	BJP	Jagdambika Pal	BSP	Aftab Alam	INC	Chandresh Upadhyay
61	Basti	BJP	Harish Dwivedi	BSP	Ram Prasad Chaudhary	INC	Raj Kishor Singh
62	Sant Kabir Nagar	BJP	Praveen Kumar Nishad	BSP	Bhishma Shankar Tiwari	INC	Bhal Chandra Yadav
63	Maharajganj	BJP	Pankaj Chaudhary	SP	Akhilesh Singh	INC	Supriya Shrinate
64	Gorakhpur	BJP	Ravi Kishan	SP	Rambhual Nishad	INC	Madhusudan Tripathi
65	Kushinagar	BJP	Vijay Kumar Dubey	SP	N.P. Kushwaha	INC	Ratanjit Pratap Singh
66	Deoria	BJP	Ramapati Ram Tripathi	BSP	Binod Kumar Jaiswal	INC	Niyaz Ahmad Khan
67	Bansgaon	BJP	Kamlesh Paswan	BSP	Sadal Prasad		
68	Lalganj	BJP	Neelam Sonkar	BSP	Sangeeta Azad	INC	Pankaj Mohan Sonkar
69	Azamgarh	BJP	Dinesh Lal Yadav	SP	Akhilesh Yadav		
70	Ghosi	BJP	Harinarayan Rajbhar	BSP	Atul Rai	INC	Balkrishna Chouhan
71	Salempur	BJP	Ravindra Kushwaha	BSP	R. S. Kushwaha	INC	Rajesh Kumar Mishra
72	Ballia	BJP	Virendra Singh Mast	SP	Sanatan Pandey		
73	Jaunpur	BJP	Krishna Pratap Singh	BSP	Shyam Singh Yadav	INC	Deo Vrat Mishra
74	Machhlishahr	BJP	B. P. Saroj	BSP	Tribhuvan Ram	JAP	Dr. Amarnath Paswan
75	Ghazipur	BJP	Manoj Sinha	BSP	Afzal Ansari	INC	Ajit Pratap Kushawaha
76	Chandauli	BJP	Mahendranath Pandey	SP	Sanjay Singh Chauhan	JAP	Shivkanya Kushwaha
77	Varanasi	BJP	Narendra Modi	SP	Shalini Yadav	INC	Ajay Rai
78	Bhadohi	BJP	Rameshchand Bind	BSP	Rangnath Mishra	INC	Ramakant Yadav
79	Mirzapur	AD(S)	Anupriya Singh Patel	SP	Ram Charitra Nishad	INC	Lalitesh Pati Tripathi
80	Robertsganj	AD(S)	Pakaudi Lal Kol	SP	Bhai Lal	INC	Bhagwati Prasad

== Exit polls ==
Polling agency				Lead
Polling agency	NDA	UPA	MGB	Lead
India Today-Axis	62-68	1-2	10-16	52
News24-Today's Chanakya	60 ± 5	1 ± 2	19 ± 6	52
News18-IPSOSCNN-IBN-IPSOS	58-60	1-2	17-19	43
VDP Associates	60	2	18	42
Times Now-VMR	58	2	20	38
Republic-CVoter	35	2	33	2
ABP News	33	2	45	12

== Results ==
Vote Share
1. BJP (49.9%)
2. BSP (19.4%)
3. SP (18.1%)
4. INC (6.30%)
5. RLD (1.69%)
6. AD(S) (1.20%)
7. Other (3.40%)
Seat Share
1. BJP (77.5%)
2. BSP (12.5%)
3. SP (6.25%)
4. AD(S) (2.50%)
5. INC (1.25%)

=== Results by Party/Alliance ===
Alliance/ Party		Popular vote			Seats		
Alliance/ Party		Votes	%	±pp	Contested	Won	+/−
NDA	BJP	4,28,58,171	50.67	▲7.96	78	62	▼9
NDA	AD(S)	10,39,478	1.31	▲0.21	2	2	Steady
NDA	Total	4,38,97,649	51.98	▲8.37	80	64	▼9
MGB	BSP	1,66,59,754	19.13	▼0.59	38	10	▲10
MGB	SP	1,55,33,620	18.03	▼4.37	37	5	Steady
MGB	RLD	14,47,363	1.59	▲0.74	3	0	Steady
MGB	Total	3,36,40,737	38.93	▼3.92	78	15	▲10
UPA	INC	54,57,352	6.36	▼1.11	67	1	▼1
UPA	JAP	2,03,369	0.24	Steady	3	0	Steady
UPA	Total	56,60,721	6.60	Steady	70	1	Steady
Others		9,77,676	1.13	Steady	487	0	Steady
IND		8,54,421	1.00	▼0.74	264	0	Steady
NOTA		7,25,097	0.85	▲0.12			
Total		8,57,56,301	100%	-	979	80	-

=== Results by Region ===
District	Seats					
District	Seats	BJP	BSP	SP	INC	ADS
South-East Uttar Pradesh	8	4	2	—N/a	—N/a	2
Bundelkhand	4	4	—N/a	—N/a	—N/a	—N/a
Rohilkhand	10	5	2	3	—N/a	—N/a
North-East Uttar Pradesh	17	13	3	1	—N/a	—N/a
West Uttar Pradesh	17	14	2	1	—N/a	—N/a
Central Uttar Pradesh	24	22	1	—N/a	1	—N/a
Total	80	62	10	5	1	1

=== Results by Prominent Party ===
62	2	10	5	1
BJP	ADS	BSP	SP	INC

64	15	1
NDA	MGB	UPA

Party	BJP	BSP	SP	AD(S)	INC
Leader	Narendra Modi	Mayawati	Akhilesh Yadav	Anupriya Singh Patel	Rahul Gandhi
Votes	49.56%, 42,857,221	19.26%, 16,658,917	17.96%, 15,533,620	1.01%, 1,038,558	6.31%, 5,457,269
Seats	62 (77.5%)	10 (12.5%)	5 (6.25%)	2 (2.5%)	1 (1.25%)
Seats	62 / 80	10 / 80	5 / 80	2 / 80	1 / 80

== Results by constituency ==
Constituency		Winner				Runner Up				Margin	%
#	Name	Candidate	Party	Votes	%	Candidate	Party	Votes	%	Margin	%
1	Saharanpur	Haji Fazlur Rehman	BSP	514,139	41.72	Raghav Lakhanpal	BJP	491,722	39.90	22,417	1.82
2	Kairana	Pradeep Choudhary	BJP	566,961	50.43	Tabassum Begum	SP	474,801	42.23	92,160	8.20
3	Muzaffarnagar	Sanjeev Balyan	BJP	573,780	49.39	Ajit Singh	RLD	567,254	48.83	6,526	0.56
4	Bijnor	Malook Nagar	BSP	561,045	50.91	Bharatendra Singh	BJP	491,104	44.57	69,941	6.34
5	Nagina (SC)	Girish Chandra	BSP	568,378	56.29	Yashwant Singh	BJP	401,546	39.77	166,832	16.52
6	Moradabad	S. T. Hasan	SP	649,416	50.65	Sarvesh Singh	BJP	551,538	43.01	97,878	7.64
7	Rampur	Azam Khan	SP	559,177	52.69	Jaya Prada	BJP	449,180	42.33	109,997	10.36
8	Sambhal	Shafiqur Rahman Barq	SP	658,006	55.58	Parameshvar Saini	BJP	483,180	40.82	174,826	14.76
9	Amroha	Danish Ali	BSP	601,082	51.39	Kn. Singh Tanwar	BJP	537,834	45.98	63,248	5.41
10	Meerut	Rajendra Agrawal	BJP	586,184	48.17	Yaqub Qureishi	BSP	581,455	47.78	4,729	0.39
11	Baghpat	Satya Pal Singh	BJP	525,789	50.29	Jayant Chaudhary	RLD	502,287	48.04	23,502	2.25
12	Ghaziabad	V. K. Singh	BJP	944,503	61.93	Suresh Bansal	SP	443,003	29.05	501,500	32.88
13	G. B. Nagar	Mahesh Sharma	BJP	830,812	59.64	Satveer Nagar	BSP	493,890	35.45	336,922	24.19
14	Bulandshahr (SC)	Bhola Singh	BJP	681,321	60.56	Yogesh Verma	BSP	391,264	34.78	290,057	25.78
15	Aligarh	Satish Kumar Gautam	BJP	656,215	56.38	Ajeet Baliyan	BSP	426,954	36.68	229,261	19.70
16	Hathras (SC)	Rajvir Singh Diler	BJP	684,299	59.43	Ramji Lal Suman	SP	424,091	36.83	260,208	22.60
17	Mathura	Hema Malini	BJP	671,293	60.79	Kn. Narendra Singh	RLD	377,822	34.21	293,471	26.58
18	Agra (SC)	S. P. Singh Baghel	BJP	646,875	56.46	Manoj Kumar Soni	BSP	435,329	38.00	211,546	18.46
19	Fatehpur Sikri	Rajkumar Chahar	BJP	667,147	64.24	Raj Babbar	INC	172,082	16.57	495,065	47.67
20	Firozabad	Chandrasen Jadon	BJP	495,819	46.06	Akshay Yadav	SP	467,038	43.38	28,781	2.68
21	Mainpuri	Mulayam Singh Yadav	SP	524,926	53.66	Prem Singh Shakya	BJP	430,537	44.01	94,389	9.65
22	Etah	Rajveer Singh	BJP	545,348	54.52	Devendra S. Yadav	SP	422,678	42.25	122,670	12.27
23	Badaun	Sanghmitra Maurya	BJP	511,352	47.28	Dharmendra Yadav	SP	492,898	45.58	18,454	1.70
24	Aonla	Dharmendra Kashyap	BJP	537,675	51.07	Ruchi Veera	BSP	423,932	40.26	113,743	10.81
25	Bareilly	Santosh Gangwar	BJP	565,270	52.88	Bhagwat Gangwar	SP	397,988	37.23	167,282	15.65
26	Pilibhit	Varun Gandhi	BJP	704,549	59.34	Hemraj Verma	SP	448,922	37.81	255,627	21.53
27	Shahjahanpur (SC)	Arun Sagar	BJP	688,990	58.04	Amar Chandra Jauhar	BSP	420,572	35.43	268,418	22.61
28	Kheri	Ajay Mishra Teni	BJP	609,589	53.62	Dr. Purvi Verma	SP	390,782	34.38	218,807	19.24
29	Dhaurahra	Rekha Verma	BJP	512,905	48.21	Arshad Iliyas Siddiqui	BSP	352,294	33.11	160,611	15.10
30	Sitapur	Rajesh Verma	BJP	514,528	48.30	Nakul Dubey	BSP	413,695	38.84	100,833	9.46
31	Hardoi (SC)	Jai Prakash	BJP	568,143	53.71	Usha Verma	SP	435,669	41.18	132,474	12.53
32	Misrikh (SC)	Ashok Rawat	BJP	534,429	52.02	Dr Neelu Satyarthi	BSP	433,757	42.22	100,672	9.80
33	Unnao	Sakshi Maharaj	BJP	703,507	56.85	Arun Shanker Shukla	SP	302,551	24.45	400,956	32.40
34	Mohanlalganj (SC)	Kaushal Kishore	BJP	629,999	49.58	C. L. Verma	BSP	539,795	42.48	90,204	7.10
35	Lucknow	Rajnath Singh	BJP	633,026	56.64	Poonam Sinha	SP	285,724	25.57	347,302	31.07
36	Rae Bareli	Sonia Gandhi	INC	534,918	55.78	Dinesh Pratap	BJP	367,740	38.35	167,178	17.43
37	Amethi	Smriti Irani	BJP	468,514	49.69	Rahul Gandhi	INC	413,394	43.84	55,120	5.85
38	Sultanpur	Maneka Gandhi	BJP	459,196	45.88	Chandra B. Singh	BSP	444,670	44.43	14,526	1.45
39	Pratapgarh	Sangam Lal Gupta	BJP	436,291	47.67	Ashok Tripathi	BSP	318,539	34.80	117,752	12.87
40	Farrukhabad	Mukesh Rajput	BJP	569,880	56.80	Manoj Agarwal	BSP	348,178	34.71	221,702	22.09
41	Etawah (SC)	Ram Katheria	BJP	522,119	50.75	Kamlesh Kumar	SP	457,682	44.49	64,437	6.26
42	Kannauj	Subrat Pathak	BJP	563,087	49.35	Dimple Yadav	SP	550,734	48.27	12,353	1.08
43	Kanpur	Satyadev Pachauri	BJP	468,937	55.60	Sriprakash Jaiswal	INC	313,003	37.11	155,934	18.49
44	Akbarpur	Devendra Singh	BJP	581,282	56.62	Nisha Sachan	BSP	306,140	29.82	275,142	26.80
45	Jalaun (SC)	Bhanu Pratap Singh	BJP	581,763	51.45	Ajay Singh	BSP	423,386	37.44	158,377	14.01
46	Jhansi	Anurag Sharma	BJP	809,272	58.59	Shyam Sundar Singh	SP	443,589	32.12	365,683	26.47
47	Hamirpur	Pushpendra Chandel	BJP	575,122	52.76	Dilip Kumar Singh	BSP	326,470	29.95	248,652	22.81
48	Banda	R. K. Singh Patel	BJP	477,926	46.18	Shyama Charan Gupta	SP	418,988	40.49	58,938	5.69
49	Fatehpur	Niranjan Jyoti	BJP	566,040	54.19	Sukhdev Prasad Verma	BSP	367,835	35.22	198,205	18.97
50	Kaushambi (SC)	Vinod Kumar Sonkar	BJP	383,009	39.28	Indrajeet Saroj	SP	344,287	35.31	38,722	3.97
51	Phulpur	Keshari Devi Patel	BJP	544,701	55.63	Pandhari Yadav	SP	372,733	38.07	171,968	17.56
52	Allahabad	Rita Bahuguna Joshi	BJP	494,454	55.58	Rajendra Singh Patel	SP	310,179	34.87	184,275	20.71
53	Barabanki (SC)	Upendra Singh Rawat	BJP	535,917	46.37	Ram Sagar Rawat	SP	425,777	36.84	110,140	9.53
54	Faizabad	Lallu Singh	BJP	529,021	48.65	Anand Sen	SP	463,544	42.63	65,477	6.02
55	Ambedkar Nagar	Ritesh Pandey	BSP	564,118	51.72	Mukut Bihari	BJP	468,238	42.93	95,880	8.79
56	Bahraich (SC)	Akshaibar Lal	BJP	525,982	53.12	Shabbir Balmiki	SP	397,230	40.12	128,752	13.00
57	Kaiserganj	Brij Bhushan Singh	BJP	581,358	59.18	Chandradev Ram Yadav	BSP	319,757	32.55	261,601	26.63
58	Shrawasti	Ram Shiromani	BSP	441,771	44.30	Daddan Mishra	BJP	436,451	43.77	5,320	0.53
59	Gonda	Kirti Vardhan Singh	BJP	508,190	54.99	Vinod Singh	SP	341,830	36.99	166,360	18.00
60	Domariyaganj	Jagdambika Pal	BJP	492,253	49.96	Aftab Alam	BSP	386,932	39.27	105,321	10.69
61	Basti	Harish Dwivedi	BJP	471,162	44.65	Ram Prasad Chaudhary	BSP	440,808	41.77	30,354	2.88
62	Sant Kabir Nagar	Praveen Nishad	BJP	467,543	43.95	Bhishma Shankar	BSP	431,794	40.59	35,749	3.36
63	Maharajganj	Pankaj Chaudhary	BJP	726,349	59.19	Akhilesh	SP	385,925	31.45	340,424	27.74
64	Gorakhpur	Ravi Kishan	BJP	717,122	60.52	Rambhual Nishad	SP	415,458	35.06	301,664	25.46
65	Kushi Nagar	Vijay Kumar Dubey	BJP	597,039	56.68	N. P. Kushwaha	SP	259,479	24.63	337,560	32.05
66	Deoria	Ramapati Ram Tripathi	BJP	580,644	57.17	Binod Kumar Jaiswal	BSP	330,713	32.56	249,931	24.61
67	Bansgaon (SC)	Kamlesh Paswan	BJP	546,673	56.37	Sadal Prasad	BSP	393,205	40.55	153,468	15.82
68	Lalganj (SC)	Sangeeta Azad	BSP	518,820	53.98	Neelam Sonkar	BJP	357,223	37.17	161,597	16.81
69	Azamgarh	Akhilesh Yadav	SP	621,578	60.36	Dinesh Lal Yadav	BJP	361,704	35.12	259,874	25.24
70	Ghosi	Atul Rai	BSP	573,829	50.27	Harinarayan Rajbhar	BJP	451,261	39.53	122,568	10.74
71	Salempur	Ravindra Kushawaha	BJP	467,940	50.64	R. S. Kushwaha	BSP	355,325	38.45	112,615	12.19
72	Ballia	Virendra Singh	BJP	469,114	47.36	Sanatan Pandey	SP	453,595	45.79	15,519	1.57
73	Jaunpur	Shyam Singh Yadav	BSP	521,128	50.02	Krishna Pratap	BJP	440,192	42.25	80,936	7.77
74	Machhlishahr (SC)	B. P. Saroj	BJP	488,397	47.17	Tribhuvan Ram	BSP	488,216	47.15	181	0.02
75	Ghazipur	Afzal Ansari	BSP	566,082	51.11	Manoj Sinha	BJP	446,690	40.33	119,392	10.78
76	Chandauli	Mahendra Nath Pandey	BJP	510,733	47.02	Sanjay Singh Chauhan	SP	496,774	45.74	13,959	1.28
77	Varanasi	Narendra Modi	BJP	674,664	63.60	Shalini Yadav	SP	195,159	18.40	479,505	45.20
78	Bhadohi	Ramesh Chand Bind	BJP	510,029	49.05	Rangnath Mishra	BSP	466,414	44.85	43,615	4.20
79	Mirzapur	Anupriya Patel	ADAL	591,564	53.34	Ram Charitra Nishad	SP	359,556	32.42	232,008	20.92
80	Robertsganj (SC)	Pakaudi Lal Kol	ADAL	447,914	45.30	Bhai Lal	SP	393,578	39.80	54,336	5.50

== By-polls ==
Constituency			Winner				Runner Up				Margin
No.	Name	Date	Candidate	Party	Votes	%	Candidate	Party	Votes	%	Margin
69	Azamgarh	23 June 2022	Dinesh Lal Yadav	BJP	312,768	34.39	Dharmendra Yadav	SP	304,089	33.44	8,679
69	Azamgarh	23 June 2022	The Azamgarh Lok Sabha bypoll was held following the resignation of the incumbent MP, Akhilesh Yadav, after he was elected to the Uttar Pradesh Legislative Assembly.								
7	Rampur	23 June 2022	Ghanshyam Singh Lodhi	BJP	367,397	51.96	Mohammad Asim Raza	SP	325,205	46.00	42,192
7	Rampur	23 June 2022	The Rampur Lok Sabha bypoll was held following the resignation of the incumbent MP, Azam Khan, after his conviction in a criminal case.								
21	Mainpuri	5 December 2022	Dimple Yadav	SP	618,120	64.08	Raghuraj Singh Shakya	BJP	329,659	34.18	288,461
21	Mainpuri	5 December 2022	The Mainpuri Lok Sabha bypoll was held following the death of the incumbent MP, Mulayam Singh Yadav.								

== Post-election Union Council of Ministers from Uttar Pradesh ==
#	Name	Constituency	Designation	Department	From	To	Party
1	Narendra Modi	Varanasi	Prime Minister	Ministry of Personnel, Public Grievances and Pensions; Department of Atomic Energy; Department of Space; All important policy issues	30 May 2019	9 June 2024	BJP
2	Rajnath Singh	Lucknow	Cabinet Minister	Ministry of Defence	31 May 2019	9 June 2024	BJP
3	Smriti Irani	Amethi	Cabinet Minister	Ministry of Women and Child Development; Ministry of Minority Affairs (from July 2022); Ministry of Textiles (until July 2021)	31 May 2019	9 June 2024	BJP
4	Hardeep Singh Puri	Rajya Sabha (Uttar Pradesh)	Cabinet Minister; MoS (I/C)	Ministry of Petroleum and Natural Gas (Cabinet from July 2021); Ministry of Housing and Urban Affairs (Cabinet from July 2021, MoS (I/C) prior); Ministry of Civil Aviation (MoS (I/C) until July 2021); Ministry of Commerce and Industry (MoS until July 2021)	31 May 2019	9 June 2024	BJP
5	Mahendra Nath Pandey	Chandauli	Cabinet Minister	Ministry of Heavy Industries (renamed from Heavy Industries and Public Enterprises); Ministry of Skill Development and Entrepreneurship (until July 2021)	31 May 2019	9 June 2024	BJP
6	Santosh Kumar Gangwar	Bareilly	MoS (I/C)	Ministry of Labour and Employment	31 May 2019	7 July 2021 (Resigned)	BJP
7	V. K. Singh	Ghaziabad	MoS	Ministry of Road Transport and Highways; Ministry of Civil Aviation (from July 2021)	31 May 2019	9 June 2024	BJP
8	Niranjan Jyoti	Fatehpur	MoS	Ministry of Rural Development; Ministry of Consumer Affairs, Food and Public Distribution (from July 2021)	31 May 2019	9 June 2024	BJP
9	Sanjeev Balyan	Muzaffarnagar	MoS	Ministry of Fisheries, Animal Husbandry and Dairying	31 May 2019	9 June 2024	BJP
10	Pankaj Chaudhary	Maharajganj	MoS	Ministry of Finance	7 July 2021	9 June 2024	BJP
11	S. P. Singh Baghel	Agra (SC)	MoS	Ministry of Health and Family Welfare (from May 2023); Ministry of Law and Justice (until May 2023)	7 July 2021	9 June 2024	BJP
12	Bhanu Pratap Singh Verma	Jalaun (SC)	MoS	Ministry of Micro, Small and Medium Enterprises	7 July 2021	9 June 2024	BJP
13	Kaushal Kishore	Mohanlalganj (SC)	MoS	Ministry of Housing and Urban Affairs	7 July 2021	9 June 2024	BJP
14	B. L. Verma	Rajya Sabha (Uttar Pradesh)	MoS	Ministry of Development of North Eastern Region; Ministry of Co-operation	7 July 2021	9 June 2024	BJP
15	Ajay Mishra Teni	Kheri	MoS	Ministry of Home Affairs	7 July 2021	9 June 2024	BJP
16	Anupriya Singh Patel	Mirzapur	MoS	Ministry of Commerce and Industry	7 July 2021	9 June 2024	AD(S)

== Assembly segments-wise lead of parties ==
Party	Assembly segments	Position in Assembly (as of 2022 election)
Bharatiya Janata Party	274	255
Bahujan Samaj Party	65	1
Samajwadi Party	41	111
Apna Dal (Sonelal)	9	12
NISHAD	0	6
Indian National Congress	8	2
Rashtriya Lok Dal	6	9
Jansatta Dal	2	2
Suheldev Bharatiya Samaj Party	0	6
Total	403	

== See also ==
- 17th Lok Sabha
- 2019 Indian general election
- Elections in Uttar Pradesh
- List of members of the 17th Lok Sabha
- Politics of Uttar Pradesh
