= Parasnath Yadav =

Indian politician (1949–2020)

Member, Legislative Assembly of Uttar Pradesh
- In office March 2012 – June 2020 (died)
- Preceded by: Constituency created
- Succeeded by: Lucky Yadav
- Constituency: Malhani (Assembly constituency)
- In office February 2002 – May 2004
- Preceded by: B R Verma
- Succeeded by: Shraddha Yadav
- In office October 1996 – March 1998
- Preceded by: Savitri Devi
- Succeeded by: B R Verma
- Constituency: Mariyahu (Assembly constituency)
- In office December 1993 – October 1995
- Preceded by: Raghu Raj
- Succeeded by: Vansh Narayan
- In office March 1985 – April 1991 (2 terms)
- Preceded by: Ram Krishan
- Succeeded by: Raghu Raj
- Constituency: Barsathi (Assembly constituency)

Minister of Livestock, Minor Irrigation Government of Uttar Pradesh
- In office March 2012 – March 2017
- Chief Minister: Akhilesh Yadav
- Succeeded by: S. P. Singh Baghel

Member of Parliament, Lok Sabha Jaunpur
- In office May 2004 – May 2009
- Preceded by: Swami Chinmayanand
- Succeeded by: Dhananjay Singh
- In office February 1998 – October 1999
- Preceded by: Rajshekhar Singh
- Succeeded by: Swami Chinmayanand

Minister of Animal Husbandry Government of Uttar Pradesh
- In office August 2003 – May 2004
- Chief Minister: Mulayam Singh Yadav

Minister of State for Secondary Education Government of Uttar Pradesh
- In office December 1989 – April 1991
- Chief Minister: Mulayam Singh Yadav

Personal details
- Born: 12 January 1949 Jaunpur, United Provinces, India
- Died: 12 June 2020 (aged 71) Jaunpur, Uttar Pradesh, India
- Cause of death: Bladder cancer
- Party: Samajwadi Party
- Spouse: Hirawati Devi (m. 1970; died 2016)
- Children: 4, including Lucky Yadav
- As of 12 June, 2020

Parasnath Yadav (12 January 1949 – 12 June 2020) was an Indian politician and was elected 7 times MLA in Legislative Assembly of Uttar Pradesh, 3 times Minister in Government of Uttar Pradesh and 2 times Member of Parliament from Jaunpur.

== Early life and education ==
Paras Nath Yadav was born 12 January 1949 in Barsathi Jaunpur district of Uttar Pradesh to his father Shree Ram Yadav. He married Hirawati Devi in 1970, who was also on post of Block Pramukh of Barsathi till his death (2016). They have three sons and one daughter. He attended Sewashram Inter College Suriyawan, Varanasi and attained Intermediate Certificate.

== Political career ==
Yadav started his journey in politics in 9th Legislative Assembly of Uttar Pradesh (1985) elections, he got ticket by Lok Dal from Barsathi (Assembly constituency). He contested and was elected MLA defeating INC's Rama Krishna by a margin of 6,008 (9.38%) votes. He was also a Member in Public Enterprises and Corporation Joint Committee (1987-1988) and Question and Reference Committee (1988-1989).

In second term, in 10th Legislative Assembly of Uttar Pradesh (1989) elections, he was elected MLA for a second time continuously by defeating INC's Lakshmi Shankar Yadav by a margin of 11,276 (12.23%) votes. He was appointed Minister of State for Secondary Education in Mulayam Singh Yadav ministry. In 1991 elections, he left Lok Dal and joined Janata Party. He again contested from Barsathi but lost to BJP's Raghuraj and stood on third with 14,686 (17%) votes. In 1992, when Mulayam Singh Yadav founded the Samajwadi Party, Yadav also left the Janata Party and joined the Samajwadi Party. From then till his death he remained associated with Samajwadi Party. He was the closest leader to Mulayam Singh Yadav.

In his third Legislature term, in 12th Legislative Assembly of Uttar Pradesh (1993) elections, he got ticket by Samajwadi Party from Barsathi and he was elected MLA. Their winning margin also increased over time, he defeated his nearest candidate INC's Shachindra Nath Tripathi by a huge margin of 41,843 (31.85%) votes.

In his fourth Legislature term, in the 13th Legislative Assembly of Uttar Pradesh (1996) elections, the Samajwadi Party did not give him a ticket from his regular assembly and gave him a ticket from Mariyahu (Assembly constituency). He was also not harmed by changing the assembly constituency and he defeated BJP's Jagannath Rao by a margin of 11,518 (9.04%) votes and was elected MLA. He was also made a member of the "Joint Committee on Scheduled Castes, Scheduled Tribes and Scheduled Castes" (1997–1998).

In 12th Lok Sabha (1998) elections, the Samajwadi Party made him its candidate from Jaunpur (Lok sabha constituency) in the middle of his fourth Legislative term. He contested against contemporaneous MP BJP's Raj Keshar Singh. He defeated Raj Keshar Singh by a margin of 13,426 (1.92%) votes and was elected MP of Jaunpur. They also contested 13th Lok Sabha (1999) elections, but lost to BJP's Swami Chinmayanand by a close margin of 8,635 (1.25%) votes.

In his fifth Legislature term, in the 14th Legislative Assembly of Uttar Pradesh (2002) elections, he again contested from Mariyahu and defeated his nearest candidate Barkhu Ram Verma (Independent) by a margin of 7,077 (5.16%) votes. In 2003, after the fall of the BSP government, when Mulayam Singh Yadav became the Chief Minister, he also got a place in the cabinet with portfolios of Animal Husbandry. In 14th Lok Sabha (2004) elections, despite being a minister, the Samajwadi Party again gave him a ticket from Jaunpur (Lok Sabha Constituency). He was elected second time MP of Jaunpur by defeating BSP's Om Prakash Dubey alias Baba Dubey by a margin of 27,125 (3.80%) votes. He was also made a member of several committees of Parliament. He also contested 15th Lok Sabha (2009) elections, but lost to BSP's Dhananjay Singh by a margin of 80,381 (10.52%) votes.

In his sixth Legislature term, in the 16th Legislative Assembly of Uttar Pradesh (2012) elections, Samajwadi Party gave him ticket from newly created Malhani (Assembly constituency). He defeated Independent candidate Dr Jagriti Singh (wife of Dhananjay Singh) by a huge margin of 31,502 (16.28%) votes and was elected MLA of Malhani. After the elections, the Samajwadi Party government was formed and Akhilesh Yadav became the new Chief Minister of Uttar Pradesh. He was also appointed Cabinet Minister in Akhilesh Yadav ministry with portfolios of Minor Irrigation and Animal Husbandry. In 16th Lok Sabha (2014) elections, despite being a minister, Samajwadi Party again made him its candidate from Jaunpur (Lok Sabha Constituency). He contested election but lost in Modi wave, he lost to BJP's Krishna Pratap Singh and stood on third with 1,80,003 (17.87%) votes.

In his last or seventh Legislature term, in 17th Legislative Assembly of Uttar Pradesh (2017) elections, he again contested from Malhani. He defeated NISHAD Party candidate Dhananjay Singh by a margin of 21,210 (10.30%) votes and was elected MLA. In June 2020, during the tenure of his seventh legislature, he died by Bladder cancer. He continued to serve the people of Jaunpur till his death.

== Death ==
On 12 June 2020, after a long battle with bladder cancer, he died aged 71 at his house in the Jaunpur district of Uttar Pradesh.

== Posts held ==
| From | To | Position | Office |
|---|---|---|---|
| 2017 | 2020 | Member, 17th Legislative Assembly of Uttar Pradesh | Malhani |
| 2012 | 2017 | Cabinet Minister, Minor Irrigation and Animal Husbandry | Government of Uttar Pradesh |
| 2012 | 2017 | Member, 16th Legislative Assembly of Uttar Pradesh | Malhani |
| 2004 | 2009 | Member, 14th Lok Sabha | Jaunpur |
| 2003 | 2004 | Cabinet Minister, Animal Husbandry | Government of Uttar Pradesh |
| 2002 | 2004 | Member, 14th Legislative Assembly of Uttar Pradesh | Mariyahu |
| 1998 | 1999 | Member, 12th Lok Sabha | Jaunpur |
| 1997 | 1998 | Member, Joint Committee on Scheduled Castes, Scheduled Tribes and Declined Castes | Government of Uttar Pradesh |
| 1996 | 1998 | Member, 13th Legislative Assembly of Uttar Pradesh | Mariyahu |
| 1993 | 1995 | Member, 12th Legislative Assembly of Uttar Pradesh | Barsathi |
| 1989 | 1991 | Minister of State, Secondary Education | Government of Uttar Pradesh |
| 1989 | 1991 | Member, 10th Legislative Assembly of Uttar Pradesh | Barsathi |
| 1988 | 1989 | Member, Question and Reference Committee | Government of Uttar Pradesh |
| 1987 | 1988 | Member, Public Enterprises and Corporation Joint Committee | Government of Uttar Pradesh |
| 1985 | 1989 | Member, 9th Legislative Assembly of Uttar Pradesh | Barsathi |
