= Raj Veer Singh =

Indian Politician

Member of Parliament, Lok Sabha
- In office 1998–1999
- Preceded by: Sarvraj Singh
- Succeeded by: Sarvraj Singh
- Constituency: Aonla
- In office 1989–1996
- Preceded by: Kalyan Singh Solanki
- Succeeded by: Sarvraj Singh
- Constituency: Aonla

Personal details
- Born: 15 October 1938 Haldwani, Uttar Pradesh
- Died: 29 December 2021 (aged 83) Noida, Uttar Pradesh
- Party: Bharatiya Janata Party
- Spouse: Lata Singh (m. 1968)
- Children: 1 son, 1 daughter
- Parent: Dharmvir Singh (father)

Raj Veer Singh (15 October 1938 – 29 December 2021) was an Indian politician from Uttar Pradesh who had represented Aonla in the Lok Sabha from 1989 to 1996 and 1998 to 1999.
