= Nadeem Javed =

Indian politician

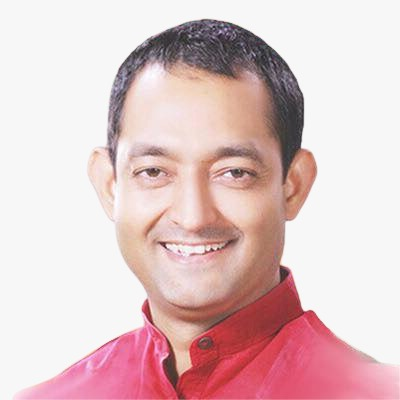

Member of Uttar Pradesh Legislative Assembly
- In office 2012 – 2017
- Succeeded by: Girish Chandra Yadav
- Constituency: Jaunpur (Assembly constituency)

Chairman of All India Minority Congress
- In office 23 May 2018 – 3 June 2021
- Preceded by: Khurshid Ahmed Saiyed
- Succeeded by: Imran Pratapgarhi

President of National Students' Union of India
- In office 2005–2008
- Preceded by: Ashok Tanwar
- Succeeded by: Hibi Eden

Personal details
- Born: 1 April 1976 (age 50) Jaunpur, Uttar Pradesh, India
- Party: Indian National Congress

Nadeem Javed is an Indian politician, affiliated to Indian National Congress. He served as the MLA representing the Jaunpur of Uttar Pradesh from 2012 to 2017. He was appointed as the chairman of All India Minority Congress, minority department of Indian National Congress, in May 2018.

== Political career ==
In March 2012, Javed won the Jaunpur (Assembly constituency) in 2012 Uttar Pradesh Legislative Assembly election, securing 50,863 votes for Indian National Congress. In 2017, he lost the UP assembly election from Jaunpur constituency.

In May 2018, he was appointed as chairperson of All India Congress Committee's Minority department by Rahul Gandhi.

He also has served as national president of All India Congress Committee students' wing National Students' Union of India and later, general secretary of Indian Youth Congress. He also served as a National Media Panelist for All India Congress Committee.

== Personal life ==
Nadeem Javed is married to Asma Nadeem Javed and they have two children, one son and one daughter.

== Posts held ==
#	From	To	Position
01	2018	3 June 2021	Chairman, All India Minority Congress
02	2012	2017	Member, Uttar Pradesh Legislative Assembly
03	2005	2008	President, National Students' Union of India

== See also ==
- Uttar Pradesh Legislative Assembly

Political offices
Preceded by Javed Ansari	MLA for Jaunpur; 2012 – 2017	Succeeded by Girish Yadav
