= Arjun Singh Yadav =

Indian politician (born 1954)

Member of Parliament, Lok Sabha
- In office 1991-1996
- Preceded by: Yadavendra Dutt Dubey
- Succeeded by: Raj Keshar Singh
- Constituency: Jaunpur, Uttar Pradesh

Personal details
- Born: 10 January 1954 (age 72) Deokali, Jaunpur, Uttar Pradesh
- Party: Janata Dal
- Spouse: Kamla Devi

Arjun Singh Yadav is an Indian politician. He was elected to the Lok Sabha, the lower house of the Parliament of India from the Jaunpur constituency in Uttar Pradesh as a member of the Janata Dal.
