= Manju Rani Chauhan =

Indian High Court judge

Hon'ble Ms. Justice Manju Rani Chauhan

Judge of Allahabad High Court
- Incumbent
- Assumed office 22 November 2018
- Nominated by: Dipak Misra
- Appointed by: Ram Nath Kovind

Personal details
- Born: 29 August 1966 (age 60)
- Education: Allahabad University

Manju Rani Chauhan (born 29 August 1966) is an additional judge of the Allahabad High Court, in Uttar Pradesh, India. She gained public attention in 2019, as a judge adjudicating several widely publicized cases, including a case concerning rape allegations against BJP politician Chinmayanand, and another regarding allegations of illegal acquisition of land against Samajwadi Party politician Azam Khan.

== Life ==
Chauhan studied law at the Allahabad University.

== Career ==
Chauhan enrolled with the Bar Council of Uttar Pradesh in 1995, and practiced civil and criminal law. She was appointed to represent the Uttar Pradesh Government and several government bodies, including the Allahabad Development Authority, and the Allahabad Gas Authority.

On 22 November 2018, she was appointed an additional judge of the Allahabad High Court. In August 2020, the Indian Supreme Court approved a proposal to make her appointment permanent.

In 2019, Chauhan was part of a bench charged by the Indian Supreme Court with monitoring a widely reported investigation into allegations of rape made by a student against BJP politician Chinmayanand. In September 2019, she refused to grant the student protection from arrest after Chinmayanand filed a complaint against her, alleging that she had been trying to extort money from him.

In September 2019, Chauhan temporarily barred the arrest of Samajwadi Party politician and Member of Parliament Azam Khan, in connection with a case relating to allegations of illegal acquisition of farmland. She also directed Bharatiya Janata Party politician and Bollywood actress Jaya Prada, who had been involved in the case, to respond to statements from Khan's lawyers that the allegations were false.

In October 2020, Chauhan quashed a case of rape and allowed the parties to arrive at a settlement, despite a Supreme Court order disallowing settlements in rape cases. The victim who had filed the case made a statement before the court that she was willing to withdraw her allegations as she had since been married to the accused. Chauhan's decision is among several High Court orders that have allowed cases of rape to be settled between parties instead of prosecuted under criminal law.
