= Jaunpur Lok Sabha constituency =

Lok Sabha Constituency in Uttar Pradesh, India

Coordinates: 25.74°N 82.67°E

Jaunpur UP-62
- Lok Sabha constituency
- Interactive Map Outlining Jaunpur Lok Sabha constituency

Constituency details
- Country: India
- Region: North India
- State: Uttar Pradesh
- Assembly constituencies: Badlapur; Shahganj; Jaunpur; Malhani; Mungra Badshahpur
- Established: 1952- Present
- Reservation: None

Member of Parliament
- 18th Lok Sabha
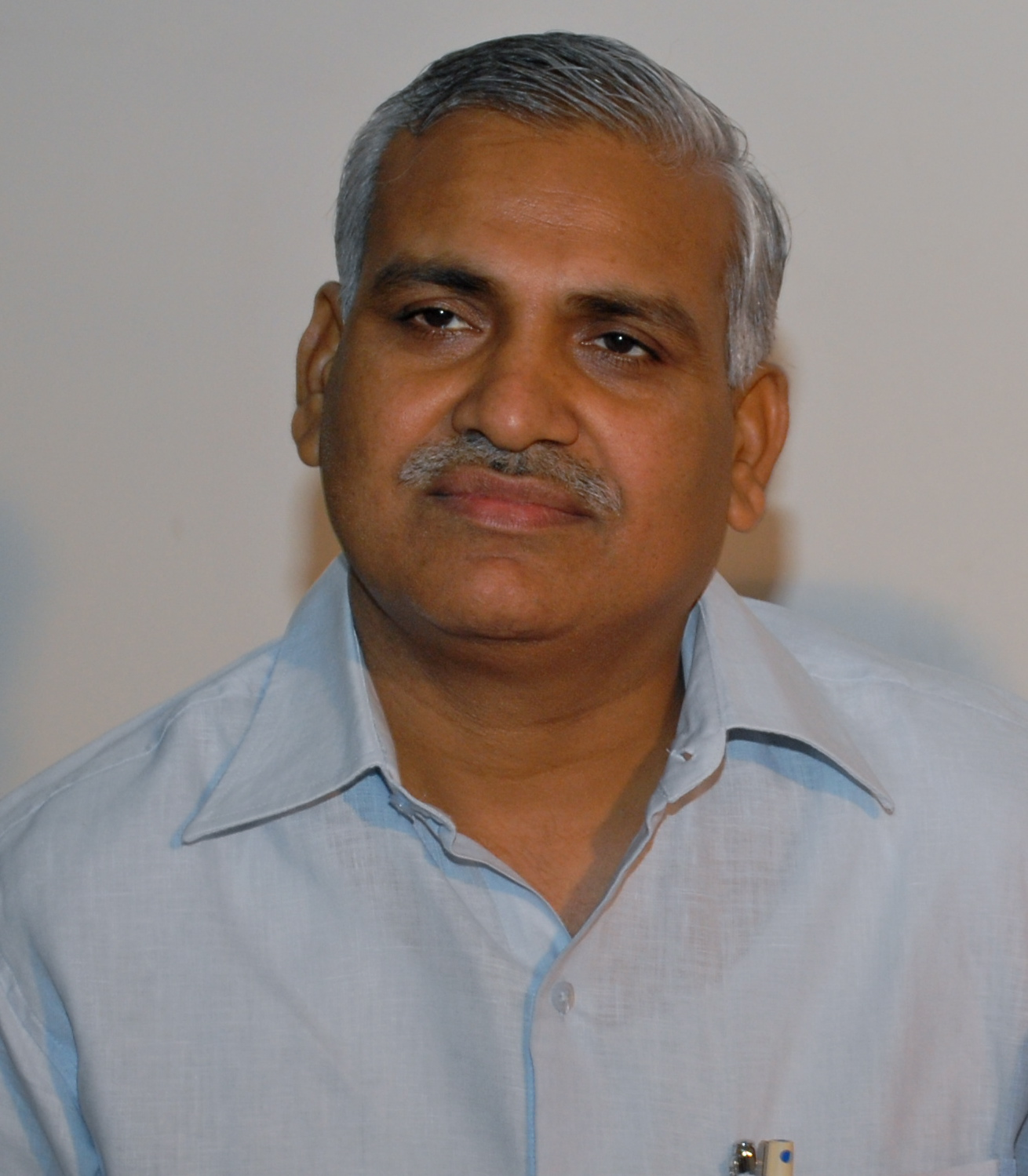
- Incumbent Babu Singh Kushwaha
- Party: Samajwadi Party
- Elected year: 2024

Jaunpur Lok Sabha Constituency is a parliamentary constituency in Purvanchal region of Uttar Pradesh in northern India.

== Assembly segments ==
The legislators on assembly segments of Jaunpur as of 2024 is:

No	Name	District	Member	Party	2024 Lead
364	Badlapur	Jaunpur	Ramesh Chandra Mishra	BJP	SP
365	Shahganj	Jaunpur	Ramesh Singh	NISHAD	SP
366	Jaunpur	Jaunpur	Girish Yadav	BJP	SP
367	Malhani	Jaunpur	Lucky Yadav	SP	SP
368	Mungra Badshahpur	Jaunpur	Pankaj Patel	SP	SP

== Members of Parliament ==
Year	Elected MP	Party
1952	Birbal Singh	Indian National Congress
1957	Birbal Singh	Indian National Congress
1962	Brahmjeet Singh	Bharatiya Jana Sangh
1963^	Rajdeo Singh	Indian National Congress
1967	Rajdeo Singh	Indian National Congress
1971	Rajdeo Singh	Indian National Congress
1977	Yadavendra Dutt Dubey	Janata Party
1980	Azizullah Azmi	Janata Party
1984	Kamla Prasad Singh	Indian National Congress
1989	Yadavendra Dutt Dubey	Bharatiya Janata Party
1991	Arjun Singh Yadav	Janata Dal
1996	Raj Keshar Singh	Bharatiya Janata Party
1998	Parasnath Yadav	Samajwadi Party
1999	Swami Chinmayanand	Bharatiya Janata Party
2004	Parasnath Yadav	Samajwadi Party
2009	Dhananjay Singh	Bahujan Samaj Party
2014	Krishna Pratap Singh	Bharatiya Janata Party
2019	Shyam Singh Yadav	Bahujan Samaj Party
2024	Babu Singh Kushwaha	Samajwadi Party

^ by poll

== Demographics ==
As per various estimates, the constituency has a population of nearly 1.2 lakh voters in this constituency are Brahmins, approximately 2.25 lakh voters are from Scheduled Castes, Yadavs make up another 2.05 lakhs, approximately 1.15 lakhs voters are Thakur, Muslims around 2.15 lakhs, Kushwaha(Maurya) are 1.50 lakhs and Other Backward Class (Other than Maurya & Yadav) makes up a little over 2.2 lakhs. In 2019, there were nearly 10.4 lakh voters in Jaunpur.

== Election results ==
=== General Election 2024 ===
General Election, 2024: Jaunpur
Party	Candidate	Votes	%	±%
SP	Babu Singh Kushwaha	509,130	46.21	▲46.21
BJP	Kripashankar Singh	4,09,795	37.19	▼5.11
BSP	Shyam Singh Yadav	1,57,137	14.26	▼35.82
NOTA	None of the Above	6,329	0.57	▲0.34
Majority		99,335	9.02	▲1.24
Turnout		11,01,788	55.72	▼0.05
SP gain from BSP		Swing		

Detailed Results at: https://results.eci.gov.in/PcResultGenJune2024/ConstituencywiseS2473.htm

=== General Election 2019 ===
2019 Indian general elections: Jaunpur
Party	Candidate	Votes	%	±%
BSP	Shyam Singh Yadav	500,543	50.08	+32.21
BJP	Krishna Pratap Singh	4,40,192	42.30	+5.85
INC	Deo Vrat Mishra	27,185	4.25	−1.64
NOTA	None of the Above	2,441	0.23	−0.03
Margin of victory		80,936	7.78	−6.74
Turnout		10,41,833	55.77	+1.29
BSP gain from BJP		Swing	+13.63	

=== General Election 2014 ===
2014 Indian general elections: Jaunpur
Party	Candidate	Votes	%	±%
BJP	Krishna Pratap (K. P.)	3,67,149	36.45	+17.68
BSP	Subhash Pandey	2,20,839	21.93	−17.68
SP	Parasnath Yadav	1,80,003	17.87	−11.23
IND.	Dhananjay Singh	64,137	6.37	New
AAP	Dr. K. P. Yadav	43,471	4.32	New
INC	Ravi Kishan	42,759	4.25	New
IND.	Ravikant Yadav	20,832	2.07	New
RUC	Shahabuddin	19,636	1.95	New
IND.	Jogendra Prasad	7,281	0.72	New
NOTA	None of the Above	2,595	0.26	New
Margin of victory		1,46,310	14.52	+4.01
Turnout		10,07,243	54.48	+8.52
BJP gain from BSP		Swing	-3.16	

== See also ==
- Jaunpur district
- List of constituencies of the Lok Sabha
