= Jan Adhikar Party =

- Abbreviation: JAP
- President: Shivkanya Kushwaha
- Lok Sabha Leader: Babu Singh Kushwaha
- Founder: Babu Singh Kushwaha
- Founded: 9 December 2016; 9 years ago
- Headquarters: Offices in New Delhi: Kothi No-11A, Near Copernicus Marg, Balwant Rai Mehta Lane, New Delhi India-110001
- Ideology: Kushwahs Interest
- Political position: Centre-left
- Colours: Yellow Maroon
- ECI status: registered unrecognised party
- Alliance: B.P.M(2022) I.N.D.I.A. (2024-Present)
- Seats in Lok Sabha: 1 / 543
- Seats in Uttar Pradesh Vidhan Sabha: 0 / 403
- Seats in Uttar Pradesh Vidhan Parishad: 0 / 100

Website
- https://www.janadhikarparty.org

The Jan Adhikar Party was founded on 9 December 2016 by Babu Singh Kushwaha with the ideology to provide equal rights to all sections of society according to their population. The party aims to empower all the deprived, exploited, labourers, farmers, poor, and women and to provide them with their rights. The main objective of the party is to release the caste census report and to give a share in all the resources of the country to all the sections in proportion to the population.

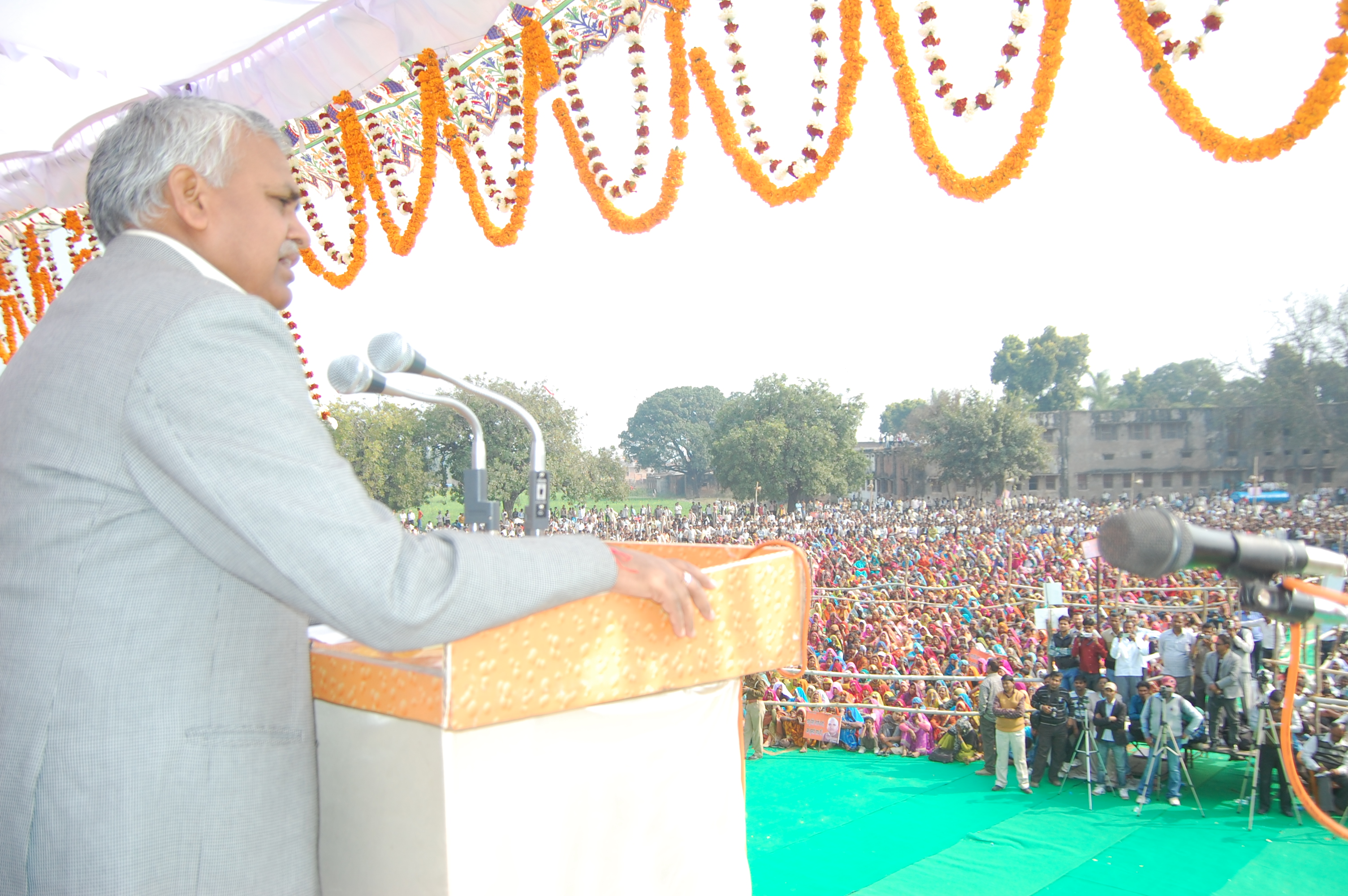
Babu Singh Kushwaha in a rally in Uttar Pradesh

In the 2019 Lok Sabha elections, the Congress party in Uttar Pradesh formed an electoral alliance with the Jan Adhikar Party.

His Jan Adhikar Party was a part of the coalition Bhagidari Parivartan Morcha in the 2022 Uttar Pradesh Legislative Assembly elections. The party did not manage to win any seats in the elections of Uttar Pradesh.

== Office holders ==
President
S.No.	Portrait	Name (born /death)	Term in office		
S.No.	Portrait	Name (born /death)	Assumed office	Left office	Time in office
1		Babu Singh Kushwaha born 7 May 1966	9 December 2016	4 August 2024	7 years, 239 days
2		Shivkanya Kushwaha born 1974	4 August 2024	Incumbent	2 years, 1 day

== 2024 General elections ==
Kushwaha won the 2024 general election from Jaunpur Lok Sabha Constituency on Samajwadi Party Symbol. His Jan Adhikar Party is a part of the INDIA Alliance .

After his victory, it was reported that despite being supported by muscleman politician Dhananjay Singh, Bharatiya Janata Party candidate Kripa Shankar Singh was unable to take an edge over Kushwaha. He was defeated by over 99,000 votes. Sitting member of parliament and Bahujan Samaj Party candidate Shyam Singh Yadav finished in third position.

Soon after his election to Lok Sabha, he was made the deputy leader of Samajwadi Party in the Lok Sabha by Akhilesh Yadav.

== Uttar Pradesh Electoral performance ==
=== Lok Sabha ===
The Lok Sabha, also known as the House of the People, is the lower house of the bicameral Parliament of India, where the upper house is Rajya Sabha. Members of the Lok Sabha are elected by an adult universal suffrage and a first-past-the-post system to represent their respective constituencies, and they hold their seats for five years or until the body is dissolved by the president of India on the advice of the union council of ministers. The house meets in the Lok Sabha chamber of the Parliament House in New Delhi.

Members of the Lok Sabha
Election Year	Leader	Alliance	seats contested	seats won	+/- in seats	Overall votes	votes %	+/- in vote share	Sitting side
2019	Babu Singh Kushwaha	UPA	3	0 / 543	New entry	2,03,369	0.24%	New entry	Others
2024	Babu Singh Kushwaha	INDIA	1	1 / 543	▲1	5,09,130	0.56%	▲0.32%	Opposition

== List of Members of the Lok Sabha ==
Sr. No.	Portrait	Member of Parliament	Winner			Term in office		
Sr. No.	Portrait	Member of Parliament	Elecation Year	Constituency	Winner Margin	Assumed office	Left office	Time in office
1		Babu Singh Kushwaha born 7 May 1966	2024	Jaunpur	99,335✓	4 June 2024	Incumbent	2 years, 62 days

== Uttar Pradesh Assembly Electoral performance ==
The Uttar Pradesh Legislative Assembly, also known as Uttar Pradesh Vidhan Sabha, is the lower house of bicameral legislature of the Indian state Uttar Pradesh. There are 403 seats in the house. Members of the Assembly are elected by an adult universal suffrage and a first-past-the-post system to represent their respective constituencies, and they hold their seats for five years or until the body is dissolved by the Governor on the advice of the council of ministers. The house meets in the Vidhan Sabha Chambers of the Vidhan Bhavan, Lucknow is the capital.

== History ==
The Legislative Assembly for the United Provinces was constituted for the first time on 1 April 1937 in accordance with the Government of India Act, 1935 with a strength of 228. The size of the Uttar Pradesh Legislative Assembly was decided as 403 members after the Uttar Pradesh Reorganisation Act, 2000. There is one nominated Anglo-Indian member in addition to 403 members. The first session of the provisional Uttar Pradesh Legislature under the new Constitution of India that established the country as a republic began on 2 February 1950. After the first elections the newly elected Assembly of Uttar Pradesh met on 19 May 1952.

Uttar Pradesh Legislative Assembly
Election Year	Leader	Alliance	seats contested	seats won	+/- in seats	Overall votes	votes %	+/- in vote share	Sitting side
2017	Babu Singh Kushwaha	NONE	39	0 / 403	New entry	22,466	0.4%	New entry	Others
2022	Babu Singh Kushwaha	BPM	137	0 / 403	▲	1,80,645,	0.19%	▲0.15%	Opposition
2027	Babu Singh Kushwaha	INDIA	TBA						
