= Neeraj Kushwaha Maurya =

Indian politician

Member of Parliament, Lok Sabha
- Incumbent
- Assumed office 4 June 2024
- Preceded by: Dharmendra Kumar Kashyap
- Constituency: Aonla

Member of Uttar Pradesh Legislative Assembly
- In office 2007–2017
- Preceded by: Sharadveer Singh
- Succeeded by: Sharadveer Singh
- Constituency: Jalalabad

Personal details
- Born: 7 July 1969 (age 57) Lucknow, Uttar Pradesh, India
- Party: Samajwadi Party
- Spouse: Rashmi Maurya
- Children: 1 son and 1 daughter
- Parent: Late Nalneesh Maurya (father)
- Education: Vidyant Hindu Post Graduation College, Dr. Ram Manohar Lohia Avadh University
- Profession: Farmer and politician

Neeraj Kushwaha Maurya (Hindi: नीरज कुशवाहा मौर्य; Hindi pronunciation: [n̪iːɾəd͡ʒ kʊʃʋaːɦaː mɔːɾjə]; born 7 July 1969) is a leader of Samajwadi Party & Hon'ble Member of Parliament from Aonla Lok Sabha Constituency, Aonla, Uttar Pradesh. He is a former member of the Uttar Pradesh Legislative Assembly. Initially, he was associated with Bahujan Samaj Party and has been an MLA from 2007 to 2017, elected twice from Jalalabad constituency in 2007 and 2012. In 2017, he left the BSP to join the Bharatiya Janata Party and played a key role in the Jalalabad Nagar Palika election. But he left the party soon afterwards and finally joined SP in 2022.

== Early life and education ==
Neeraj Kushawaha was born in Samesi Lucknow. He attended the Vidyant Hindu PG College and attained Bachelor's degree. He belongs to kushwaha caste.

== Political career ==
Neeraj Kushawaha has been an MLA for two terms. He represented the Jalalabad constituency and was a member of the Bahujan Samaj Party political party. In 2024 Indian general election, he was made a candidate of Samajwadi Party from Aonla Lok Sabha constituency. He won this seat to become the member of Indian parliament for the first time.

== Posts held ==
#	From	To	Position	Comments
01	2012	2017	Member, 16th Legislative Assembly	
02	2007	2012	Member, 15th Legislative Assembly	

== See also ==
- Jalalabad (UP Assembly constituency)
- Sixteenth Legislative Assembly of Uttar Pradesh
- Uttar Pradesh Legislative Assembly
