= Rajdeo Singh =

Indian politician

Member of Parliament, Lok Sabha
- In office 1963–1977
- Preceded by: Birbal Singh
- Succeeded by: Yadavendra Dutt Dubey
- Constituency: Jaunpur, Uttar Pradesh

Personal details
- Born: 4 October 1908 Nathupur, Jaunpur, United Provinces, British India (present-day Uttar Pradesh, India)
- Died: 25 February 1984 (aged 75)
- Party: Indian National Congress
- Spouse: Gujrati Devi
- Children: 2 son

Rajdeo Singh (4 October 1908 – 25 February 1984 ) was an Indian politician. He was elected to the Lok Sabha, the lower house of the Parliament of India from the Jaunpur constituency in Uttar Pradesh as a member of the Indian National Congress.
