= Aonla Assembly constituency =

Constituency of the Uttar Pradesh Legislative Assembly, India

Aonla
- Constituency No. 126 for the Uttar Pradesh Legislative Assembly

Constituency details
- Country: India
- Region: North India
- State: Uttar Pradesh
- District: Bareilly
- Total electors: 3,49,275 (2022)
- Reservation: None

Member of Legislative Assembly
- 18th Uttar Pradesh Legislative Assembly
- Incumbent Dharmpal Singh
- Party: Bharatiya Janata Party
- Elected year: 2022

Aonla Assembly constituency (Hindi pronunciation: [ãːʋlaː]) is one of the 403 constituencies of the Uttar Pradesh Legislative Assembly, India. It is a part of the Bareilly district and one of the five assembly constituencies in the Aonla Lok Sabha constituency. First election in this assembly constituency was held in 1952 after the "DPACO (1951)" (delimitation order) was passed in 1951. After the "Delimitation of Parliamentary and Assembly Constituencies Order" was passed in 2008, the constituency was assigned identification number 126.

== Wards / Areas ==
Extent of Aonla Assembly constituency is KCs Aonla, Aliganj, Siroli, Aonla NPP & Siroli NP of Aonla Tehsil.

== Members of the Legislative Assembly ==
Year	Member	Party
1952	Nawal Kishore	Indian National Congress
1957	Nawal Kishore	Indian National Congress
1962	Nawal Kishore	Indian National Congress
1967	D. Prakash	Bharatiya Jana Sangh
1969	Kesho Ram	Indian National Congress
1974	Shyam Bihari Singh	Bharatiya Jana Sangh
1977	Shyam Bihari Singh	Janata Party
1980	Kalyan Singh	Indian National Congress (Indira)
1985	Shyam Bihari Singh	Bharatiya Janata Party
1989	Shyam Bihari Singh	Bharatiya Janata Party
1991	Shyam Bihari Singh	Bharatiya Janata Party
1993	Mahipal Singh Yadav	Samajwadi Party
1996	Dharmpal Singh	Bharatiya Janata Party
2002	Dharmpal Singh	Bharatiya Janata Party
2007	Radha Krishan Sharma	Bahujan Samaj Party
2012	Dharmpal Singh	Bharatiya Janata Party
2017	Dharmpal Singh	Bharatiya Janata Party
2022	Dharmpal Singh	Bharatiya Janata Party

== Election results ==
=== 2027 ===
2027 Uttar Pradesh Legislative Assembly election: Aonla
Party	Candidate	Votes	%	±%
INDIA				
NDA				
BSP				
NOTA	None of the above			
Majority				
Turnout				
gain from		Swing		

=== 2022 ===
2022 Uttar Pradesh Legislative Assembly election: Aonla
Party	Candidate	Votes	%	±%
BJP	Dharmpal Singh	88,956	46.45	+11.69
SP	Radha Krishan Sharma	70,532	36.83	+4.02
BSP	Laxman Prasad	18,773	9.8	−20.02
Independent	Jeeraj Singh	5,382	2.81	
INC	Omveer Yadav	2,307	1.2	
NOTA	None of the above	1,211	0.63	−0.37
Majority		18,424	9.62	+7.67
Turnout		191,509	60.79	−0.17
BJP hold		Swing		

=== 2017 ===
2017 Uttar Pradesh Legislative Assembly election: Aonla
Party	Candidate	Votes	%	±%
BJP	Dharmpal Singh	63,165	34.76	
SP	Sidhraj Singh	59,619	32.81	
BSP	Agam Kumar Maurya	54,192	29.82	
NOTA	None of the above	1,794	1.0	
Majority		3,546	1.95	
Turnout		181,709	60.96	

=== 2012 ===
2012 General Elections: Aonla
Party	Candidate	Votes	%	±%
BJP	Dharmpal Singh	50,782	30.85	−
SP	Mahipal Singh Yadav	46,374	28.17	−
BSP	Sajid Ali Khan	41,082	24.96	−
	Remainder 15 candidates	26,375	16.04	−
Majority		4,408	2.68	−
Turnout		164,613	66.3	−
BJP gain from BSP		Swing		

== See also ==
- Aonla Lok Sabha constituency
- Bareilly district
- Sixteenth Legislative Assembly of Uttar Pradesh
- Uttar Pradesh Legislative Assembly
- Vidhan Bhawan
