= Brij Raj Singh =

Indian politician

Member of Parliament, Lok Sabha
- In office 1962–1967
- Preceded by: Post Established
- Succeeded by: Savitri Shyam
- Constituency: Anola

Member of Parliament, Lok Sabha
- In office 1977–1980
- Preceded by: Savitri Shyam
- Succeeded by: Jaipal Singh Kashyap
- Constituency: Anola

Personal details
- Born: 24 May 1924 Bareilly, Uttar Pradesh, India
- Party: Janata Party
- Other political affiliations: Bharatiya Lok Dal; Bharatiya Jan Sangh; Indian National Congress
- Spouse: Subhadra Thakur

Brij Raj Singh is an Indian politician and was a member of 6th Lok Sabha. He left education for participating in the youth rally of Netaji Subhas Bose in the year 1941 and joined Indian National Congress. He remained with Indian National Congress till 1957 then joined Bharatiya Jana Sangh in 1962. He was elected to 6th Lok Sabha from Anola as a member of Hindu Mahasabha and again 6th Lok Sabha as a member of Bharatiya Lok Dal from Anola.

== See also ==
- Politics of India
- List of political parties in India
