= Bhagidari Parivartan Morcha =

Indian political alliance

- Abbreviation: BPM
- Leader: Asaduddin Owaisi
- President: Babu Singh Kushwaha
- Chairperson: Waman Meshram
- Founder: Asaduddin Owaisi and Babu Singh Kushwaha, Waman Meshram
- Founded: 22 January 2022; 4 years ago
- Dissolved: 6 March 2023; 3 years ago
- Ideology: Minority, Adivasi, Dalit Rights; Constitutionalism; Secularism; Democracy
- Political position: Big tent
- ECI status: Unrecognised
- Seats in Rajya Sabha: 0 / 245
- Seats in Lok Sabha: 0 / 543
- Seats in Uttar Pradesh Legislative Assembly: 0 / 403
- Number of states and union territories in government: 0 / 31

The Bhagidari Parivartan Morcha is a Political Alliance of All India Majlis-e-Ittehadul Muslimeen, Jan Adhikar Party of Babu Singh Kushwaha, Rashtriya Parivartan Morcha of Waman Meshram, Bahujan Mukti Party, Bhartiya Vanchit Samaj Party and Janata Kranti Party for 2022 Uttar Pradesh Legislative Assembly election. Morcha had promised Two Chief Ministers and Three Deputy Chief Ministers if they come to power. Morcha decided to support Candidates of Peace Party of India in February 2022.

== Candidates ==
Candidate name	Constituency	Party
Priti Mishra	Shikohabad	AIMIM
Irfan Ahmad Malik	Domariyaganj	AIMIM
Mo Rafiq	Sandila	AIMIM
Mo Usman Siddique	Lakhimpur	AIMIM
Mohd Islam	Gorakhpur Rural	AIMIM
Abdul Qadir	Allahabad North	AIMIM
Haider	Pratappur	AIMIM
Sita Ram Saroj	Soraon	AIMIM
Mohammad Asif (Hakeem ji)	Gopalpur	AIMIM
D.P Singh	Rampur Maniharan	BMP
Chaudhary Sonu Kumar	Nakur	BMP
Maulana Umair Madni	Deoband	AIMIM
Rita	Saharanpur Rural	BMP
Guddu Jamali	Mubarakpur	AIMIM
Abdullaha	Gopalpur	AIMIM
Kamar Kamal	Azamgarh	AIMIM
Abdur Rahman	Nizamabad	AIMIM
Mohd Javed	Didarganj	AIMIM
Karamveer Azad	Mehnagar	AIMIM
Adv Nayab Ahmad	Shahganj	AIMIM
Abhay Raj Bharti	Jaunpur	AIMIM
Ramzan Ali	Mungra Badshahpur	AIMIM
DR. Mohd Saad Adil	Ghazipur Sadar	AIMIM
Shaukat Ali	Zahoorbad	AIMIM
Abid Ali	Mughalsarai	AIMIM
Harish Mishra	Varanasi North	AIMIM
Parvez Quadir Khan	Varanasi South	AIMIM
Ravi Shankar Jaiswal	Bhadohi	AIMIM
Terhai Ram	Aurai	AIMIM
Badruddin Hashmi	Mirzapur	AIMIM
Md Shameem Khan	Ballia Sadar	AIMIM
Pandit Manmohan Gama	Sahibabad	AIMIM
Intaezaar Ansari	Muzaffarnagar Sadar	AIMIM
Tahir Ansari	Charthawal	AIMIM
Talib Siddiqui	Bhojpur	AIMIM
Sadiq Ali	Jhansi Sadar	AIMIM
Sher Afghan	Rudauli	AIMIM
Taufeeq Pradhan	Bithri Chainpur	AIMIM
Dr. Abdul Mannan	Utraula	AIMIM
Dr. Mahtab	Loni	AIMIM
Furqan Chaudhari	Garh Mukteshwar	AIMIM
Haji Arif	Dhaulana	AIMIM
Rafat Khan	Siwal Khas	AIMIM
Zeeshan Alam	Saradhana	AIMIM
Tasleem Ahmad	Kithore	AIMIM
Amjad Ali	Behat	AIMIM
Raju Khan	Bareily	AIMIM
Marghoob Hasan	Saharanpur Rural	AIMIM
Asim Waqar	Lucknow West	AIMIM
Salman Siddiqui	Lucknow Central	AIMIM
Mohd Ali	Naugawan Sadat	AIMIM
Geeta Rani	Dhanaura	AIMIM
