= Yadavendra Dutt Dubey =

Indian politician

- Maharaja of Jaunpur
- Reign: 1944-1971
- Coronation: 1944
- Predecessor: Shrikrishna Dutt Dubey
- Successor: Title Abolished
- Born: 7 December 1918; Jaunpur, Uttar Pradesh(Oudh), British India
- Died: 9 September 1999 (aged 80); Varanasi, Uttar Pradesh, India
- Spouse: Rani Dayavati Dube (m. 1940)
- Father: Raja Shri Krishna Dutt Dube

Member of Parliament, Lok Sabha
- In office 1989–1991
- Preceded by: Kamla Prasad Singh
- Succeeded by: Arjun Singh Yadav
- Constituency: Jaunpur
- In office 1977–1980
- Preceded by: Rajdeo Singh
- Succeeded by: Azizullah Azmi
- Constituency: Jaunpur

Leader of the Opposition Uttar Pradesh Legislative Assembly
- In office 28 March 1962 – 2 February 1964
- Chief Minister: Chandra Bhanu Gupta; Sucheta Kripalani
- Preceded by: Triloki Singh
- Succeeded by: Sharda Bhukt Singh

Member of Uttar Pradesh Legislative Assembly
- In office 1969–1974
- Preceded by: K.Prasad
- Succeeded by: Naju Ram
- Constituency: Barsathi
- In office 1957–1967
- Preceded by: constituency established
- Succeeded by: K.Pati
- Constituency: Jaunpur

Personal details
- Party: Bharatiya Janata Party (1980-his death)
- Other political affiliations: Bharatiya Jan Sangh (till 1977)

Yadavendra Dutt Dube (7 December 1918 – 1999) was the 11th Maharaja of Jaunpur (1944-1971). He had been a member of the Hindu nationalist organisation Rashtriya Swayamsevak Sangh since 1942 and became its sanghchalak (director) for the Varanasi division. He was elected to the 6th (1977) and 9th (1989) Lok Sabha from Jaunpur on a Bharatiya Jan Sangh ticket. He was a member of Uttar Pradesh Legislative Assembly for 17 years and served as its leader of opposition from 1962 to 1964.
