= Savitri Shyam =

India politician (1918–1989)

Member of Parliament, Lok Sabha
- In office 1967–1977
- Preceded by: Brij Raj Singh
- Succeeded by: Brij Raj Singh
- Constituency: Aonla, Uttar Pradesh

Personal details
- Born: 2 May 1918 Muzaffarnagar, United Provinces, British India
- Died: 28 November 1989 (aged 71)
- Party: Indian National Congress
- Spouse: Shyam Sunder

Savitri Shyam (2 May 1918 – 28 November 1989) was an Indian politician. She was elected to the Lok Sabha, lower house of the Parliament of India from Aonla, Uttar Pradesh as member of the Indian National Congress. She was defeated in 1977 by Brij Raj Singh.

Shyam died on 28 November 1989, at the age of 71.
