= Babu Singh Kushwaha =

Indian politician (born 1966)

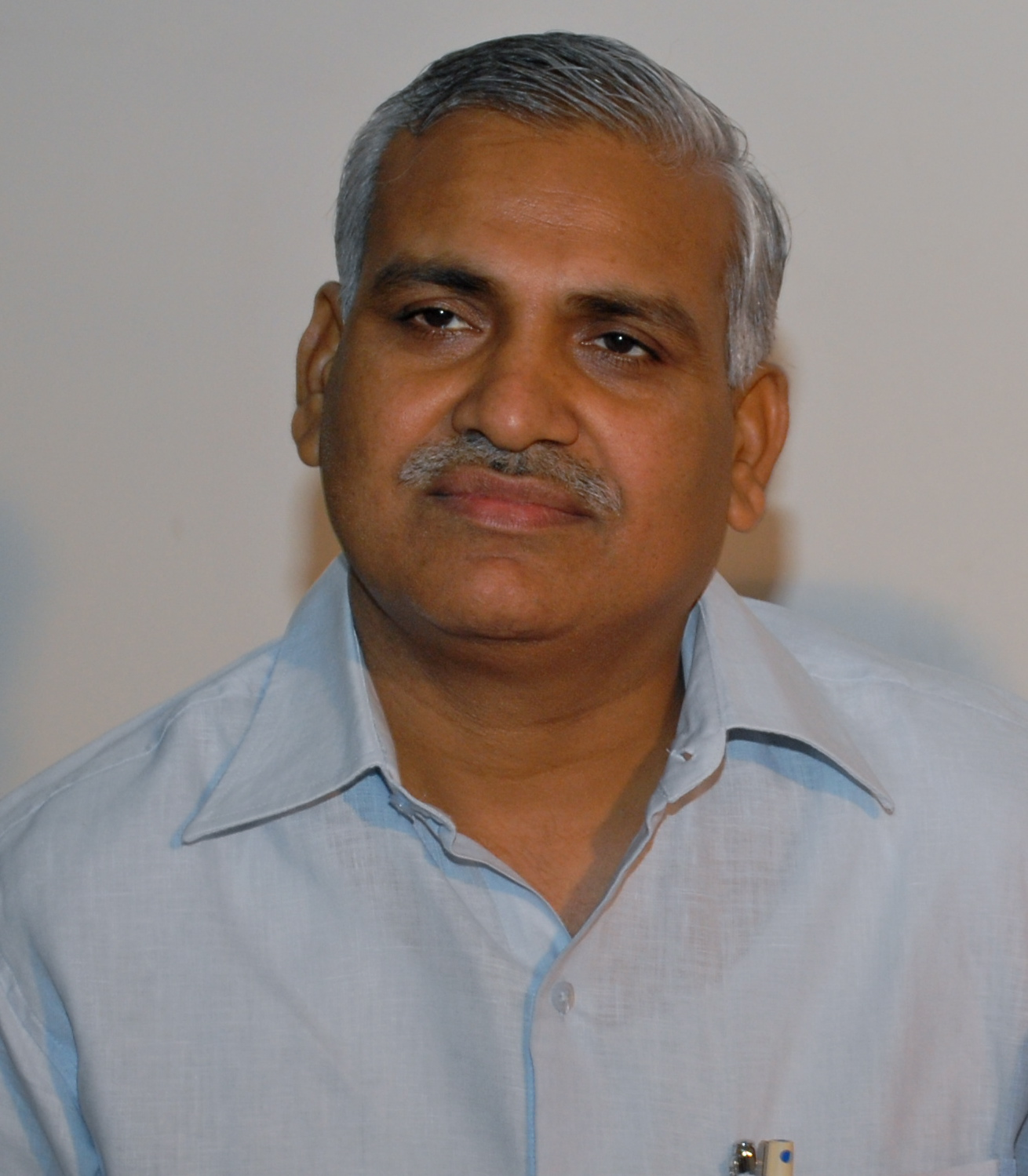

Deputy Leader, Samajwadi Party in Lok Sabha
- Incumbent
- Assumed office 30 July 2024
- Leader: Akhilesh Yadav

Member of Parliament, Lok Sabha
- Incumbent
- Assumed office 4 June 2024
- Preceded by: Shyam Singh Yadav
- Constituency: Jaunpur

Cabinet Minister Government of Uttar Pradesh
- In office 13 May 2007 – 8 April 2011
- Chief Minister: Mayawati
- Ministry & Department's: Family Welfare.; Panchayati Raj.; Mining.; Geology.; Cooperative.
- In office 11 October 2002 – 28 May 2003
- Chief Minister: Mayawati
- Ministry & Department's: Mining.; Geology.

Member of the Uttar Pradesh Legislative Council
- In office 6 May 2000 – 5 May 2012
- Constituency: elected by MLA'S

Personal details
- Born: 7 May 1966 (age 60) Pakhrauli, Uttar Pradesh, India
- Party: Samajwadi Party (2024-Present)
- Other political affiliations: Bahujan Samaj Party (1984-2011) Jan Adhikar Party (2016-2024)
- Spouse: Shivkanya Kushwaha
- Children: 4
- Profession: Politician
- Website: https://www.janadhikarparty.org/

Babu Singh Kushwaha (born 7 May 1966) is an Indian politician from Uttar Pradesh, serving as chief of the Jan Adhikar Party and former Family Welfare Minister in the Uttar Pradesh government under Mayawati. He was also one of Behenji’s trusted backroom boys, who besides working at the grassroots looked after the party’s administrative affairs. In the 2024 Indian general election, he won from the Jaunpur Lok Sabha constituency on a Samajwadi Party ticket, becoming a member of Lok Sabha for the first time.

== Background ==
Kushwaha belongs to a farming family in Pakhrauli village of Banda district, and graduated in 1985. After this, he started his life by putting a dump in Atarra. In April 1988, he came in contact with BSP founder Kanshi Ram. Kanshi Ram called him to Delhi.

Within six months, he was promoted and sent to do organisation work in the Lucknow office. He became the District President of Banda in 1993. In 2003, he was made the Minister of Panchayati Raj in the BSP government.

In 2007, when BSP came to power with an absolute majority, Kushwaha was appointed to important departments like minerals, appointments, and cooperatives. When the Department of Family Welfare was formed, this department was also handed over to him. He was one of the three pillars of the Bahujan Samaj Party when Mayawati was at the peak of her political career along with Swami Prasad Maurya and Nasimuddin Siddiqui.

== Political journey ==
Kushwaha had been a member of Bahujan Samaj Party for 27 years. He was for years perceived as the closest to Mayawati. He was a member of the Uttar Pradesh Legislative Council and was also appointed as a cabinet minister twice. Kushwaha was the second most powerful person in the Bahujan Samaj Party. After the successive murders of two medical officers in Lucknow he blew the lid off the giant National Rural Health Mission scam. He had held the portfolio of the Family Welfare, Mining, Panchayati Raj and several other departments before resigning.

Kushwaha joined the BJP in the presence of senior leaders Vinay Katiyar and Surya Pratap Shahi, but his induction resulted in voices of dissent in the party, after which he wrote a letter to BJP national president Nitin Gadkari requesting him to suspend his membership until proven innocent. Kushwaha formed the political party Jan Adhikar Party in 2016.

His wife Shivkanya Kushwaha contested for Ghazipur Lok Sabha constituency from the Samajwadi Party (SP) in 2014. She placed second, receiving 27.82% of votes, and losing by 32,452 votes to Manoj Sinha of BJP.

== Jan Adhikar Party ==
Babu Singh Kushwaha founded the Jan Adhikar party on 9 December 2016, with the ideology to provide equal rights to all sections of society according to their population. The party aims to empower all the deprived, exploited, labourers, farmers, poor, and women and to provide them with their rights. The main objective of the party is to release the caste census report and to give a share in all the resources of the country to all the sections in proportion to the population.

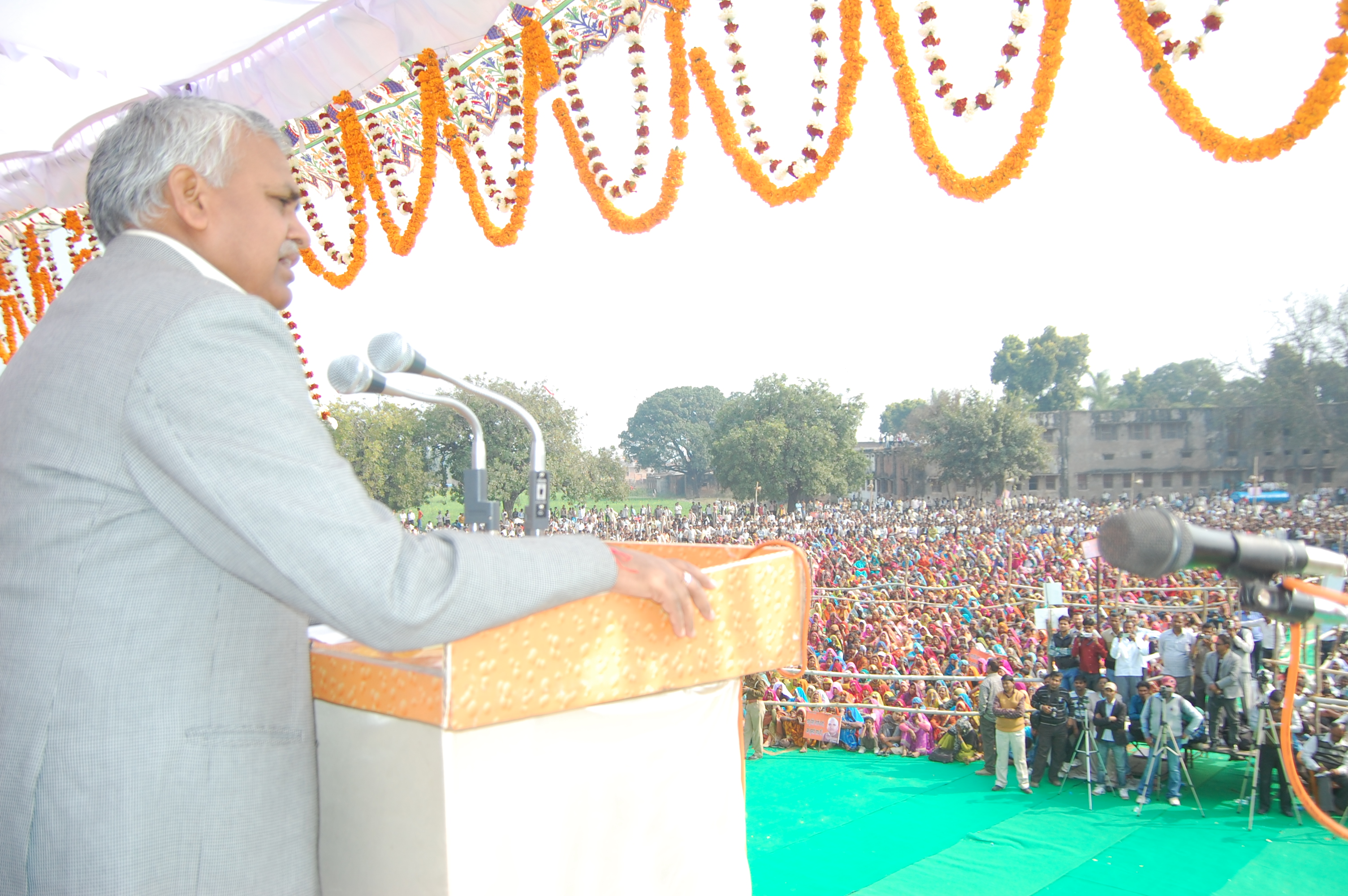

His Jan Adhikar Party was a part of the coalition Bhagidari Parivartan Morcha in the 2022 Uttar Pradesh Legislative Assembly elections. The party did not manage to win any seats in the elections of Uttar Pradesh.

== 2024 General elections ==
Kushwaha won the 2024 general election from Jaunpur Lok Sabha Constituency on Samajwadi Party Symbol. His Jan Adhikar Party is a part of the INDIA Alliance .

After his victory, it was reported that despite being supported by muscleman politician Dhananjay Singh, Bharatiya Janata Party candidate Kripa Shankar Singh was unable to take an edge over Kushwaha. He was defeated by over 99,000 votes. Sitting member of parliament and Bahujan Samaj Party candidate Shyam Singh Yadav finished in third position.

Soon after his election to Lok Sabha, he was made the deputy leader of Samajwadi Party in the Lok Sabha by Akhilesh Yadav.
