= Mahagathbandhan (Uttar Pradesh) =

Political alliance in the 2019 Indian general election

- Abbreviation: MGB
- Founder: Mayawati (Bahujan Samaj Party); Akhilesh Yadav (Samajwadi Party)
- Headquarters: Uttar Pradesh
- Ideology: Big tent Factions: Social equality Social justice Self-respect; Social democracy Left-wing populism Social conservatism Communism; Marxism-Leninism

The Mahagathbandhan (or Grand Alliance), or MGB, or simply the Gathbandhan (Alliance), was an anti-Congress, anti-BJP, Indian political alliance formed in the run-up to the 2019 general election under the leadership of two former Chief Ministers of Uttar Pradesh, Akhilesh Yadav of the Samajwadi Party and Mayawati of the Bahujan Samaj Party, along with Ajit Singh's Rashtriya Lok Dal.

The Mahagathbandhan left 2 seats in Uttar Pradesh for Congress president Rahul Gandhi and his mother Sonia Gandhi to run in and Mayawati declared its support for the two. The coalition alliance has brought together "two arch rivals" of the past, and have been campaigning at the grassroots level.

Mahagathbandhan opposed BJP's Narendra Modi in the 2019 general elections. According to the Business Standard, the Mahagathbandhan attempted to compete in the 2019 election using caste vote bank arithmetic. The Mahagathbandhan alliance was projected as a "bulwark against a second term for BJP", but found little support among the voters and was "virtually swept away", according to The Tribune India. In June 2019, Mayawati blamed the general elections defeat of the alliance on the weakness within the Samajwadi party, its failure to consolidate the backward caste votes. Mayawati ended the alliance. The Samajwadi Party confirmed the "undoing of the Mahagathbandhan", according to The Week.

== Background ==
The Samajwadi Party (SP) and the Bahujan Samaj Party (BSP) are the two largest parties in the 2019 Mahagathbandhan. Kanshi Ram and Mulayam Singh Yadav formed an alliance in the early 1990s, when they formed a coalition government in the state of Uttar Pradesh, with Mulayam Singh Yadav as the state's chief minister. The alliance won the 1993 assembly elections against BJP. They used the slogan Mile Mulayam, Kanshi Ram, Hava mein ud gaye Jai Shri Ram in the wake of the Ram Janmabhoomi movement, with the slogan meaning "Mulayam & Kanshiram Come Together, Jai Shri Ram Vanishes". In 1991 and 1993 elections, Mulayam Singh Yadav transferred his votes to Kanshi Ram's BSP. In undivided UP, BSP contested 164 seats and won 67 while SP contested 256 seats and won 109 in the house of 425 resulting in coalition government formed with Congress's support from the outside.

On 1 June 1995, Mayawati accused Samajwadi party of usurping its voters and decided to end the alliance. The Samajwadi leadership learned that the Bahujan Samaj Party had decided to end the alliance. On 2 June 1995, states the Indian Express, Samajwadi Party's leaders decided to raid BSP, create a breakaway group in the BSP, bring the breakaway group into the SP to keep power. These leaders, along with grassroots level workers of the Samajwadi Party, then went to the Bahujan Samaj Party guest house where a meeting was in progress. There, they surrounded the premises and began a rampage armed with weapons. According to the Economic Times, the Samajwadi workers "hurled casteist slurs at her and threatened her." The SP group is alleged to have beaten up the BSP representatives and workers with lathis (wooden rods), held them against their will, and had sought to beat up Mayawati. A Bharatiya Janata Party leader named Brahm Dutt Dwivedi, states The Indian Express, present at the site, protected Mayawati from a physical assault from the rampaging Samajwadi Party team. This event, called the "Guest House Episode" in regional political history, led to a nearly two-decade split and bitter confrontation between the Samajwadi Party and the Bahujan Samaj Party. After the fall of the government, BJP offered support to BSP to form the government. The journalist Subhash Mishra alleges that the BJP extended its support to the BSP in 1995 to divide the Dalit, Other Backward Castes and Muslim vote banks of SP and BSP.

Both SP and BSP have alternatively held power and accused the other of corruption since 1995. In 2003, for example, Mayawati alleged corruption by Samajwadi Party leadership. Her government filed 136 charges against Mulayam Singh Yadav for misusing the state's discretionary fund. In 2007, Mulayam Singh Yadav slapped corruption charges on Mayawati in the Taj corridor scam, according to The Times of India. In 2009, while Mayawati was in power, her BSP party workers were accused by the opposition for framing them, burning their house, and of physical assault. In 2012, the Samajwadi Party won the state assembly elections, and after the election results were announced, its workers physically assaulted the Bahujan Samaj Party leaders. In 2013, Mayawati termed the Samajwadi-led government as "mafias, goondas and criminals" running the show, demanding the central Congress-led government to intervene in the law and order situation in the state.

During a series of by-elections in March 2018, Mayawati ordered BSP voters to transfer their votes to Samajwadi Party candidates. The journalist Piyush Srivastava states that this defeated the BJP candidates in the Gorakhpur and Phulpur constituencies.

== Mahagathbandhan members ==
Party		Symbol	Leader(s)	Seats contested
Bahujan Samaj Party	BSP		Mayawati	38
Samajwadi Party	SP		Akhilesh Yadav	37
Rashtriya Lok Dal	RLD		Chaudhary Ajit Singh	3

== Mahagathbandhan campaign ==
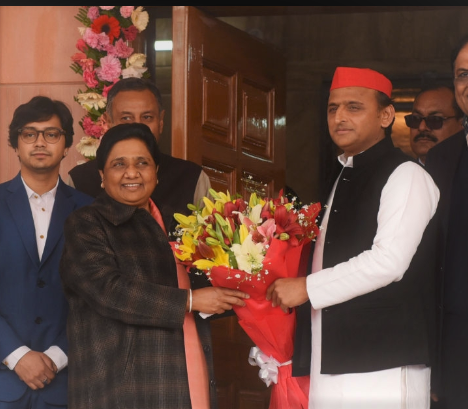
Mahagathbandhan leaders before a crucial meeting

Mahagathbandhan held many election rallies in different Lok Sabha constituencies. BSP's unit Bahujan Volunteer Force and SP's unit Lohia Vahini worked with cooperation during campaign. BSP pledged to offer new farming model in Himachal Pradesh. In Punjab, resurgent BSP drew huge crowds in comparison to Congress. Mayawati herself campaigned for Mulayam Singh Yadav, Akhilesh Yadav and Dimple Yadav and herself voted for SP's cycle symbol first time in her political history. BSP-LSP Alliance in Haryana created Dalit-OBC social coalition. Slogans of Mahagathbandhan include Jai Bhim, Jai Bharat, Jai Lohia and Mahagathbandhan Se Mahaparivartan. University of Oxford's Oxford Internet Institute conducted study which stated that Mahagathbandhan shared least junk news while BJP and Congress shared large amount of divisive and conspiratorial content on social media in 2019 elections.

== Support to Mahagathbandhan ==
Mahagathbandhan has received support from Aam Aadmi Party, Congress, Akhil Bhartiya Jat Aarakshan Sangharsh Samiti and Jamaat-e-Islami Hind.

=== Opinion polls ===
In a survey conducted by the India Today group, the Mahagathbandhan was expected to have considerable success in the 2019 elections, being projected to win 58 seats in total. According to a News Nation's opinion poll, the SP-BSP alliance was "likely to win 41 to 42 seats" in Uttar Pradesh, the BJP-AD alliance was likely to win 37 seats, and the Congress winning only 1 seat. According to India TV-CNX opinion poll, the BJP-AD alliance was likely to win 41 seats, the BSP-SP-RLD alliance likely to win 35, while 4 seats were likely for the Congress. Ambit projected BJP winning just 30 to 35 seats with 34.2 per cent vote share and Mahagathbandhan getting 45 per cent votes in UP. Om Prakash Rajbhar claimed BJP would get less seats than BSP-SP-RLD combined.

However, in the election, the Mahagathbandhan performed much more poorly than those projections securing 15 seats of 80, while the BJP performed much better securing 62 of the 80 seats.

== Electoral performance ==
=== Indian general election in Uttar Pradesh ===
Year	Seats won/ Seats contested	Change in seats	Vote share (%)	+/- (%)	Popular vote
2019	15 / 78	▲15	38.92%	▲38.92	3,57,02,733

Party-wise results
Party	Popular vote			Seats		
Party	Votes	%	±pp	Contested	Won	+/−
Bahujan Samaj Party	16,659,754	19.43	▲0.19	38	10	▲10
Samajwadi Party	15,533,620	18.11	▲4.07	37	5	-
Rashtriya Lok Dal	1,447,363	1.69	▲0.84	3	0	-
Total	33,640,737	39.23	3.42	78	15	10

=== Uttar Pradesh Legislative Assembly election ===
Year	Seats won/ Seats contested	Change in seats	Vote share (%)	+/- (%)	Popular vote
1993	176 / 422	▲176	29.45%	▲29.45	1,75,29,213

== Views on other parties ==
In May 2019, Mayawati of the Mahagathbandhan accused BJP and Congress of being anti-Dalit and anti-OBC.

== See also ==
- Mahagathbandhan (Bihar)
