= Malhani Assembly constituency =

Constituency of the Uttar Pradesh legislative assembly in India

Coordinates: 25.85°N 82.63°E

Malhani
- Constituency No. 367 for the Uttar Pradesh Legislative Assembly

Constituency details
- Country: India
- Region: North India
- State: Uttar Pradesh
- District: Jaunpur
- Total electors: 379,389
- Reservation: None

Member of Legislative Assembly
- 18th Uttar Pradesh Legislative Assembly
- Incumbent Lucky Yadav
- Party: Samajwadi Party
- Elected year: 2022
- Preceded by: Parasnath Yadav

Malhani is a constituency of the Uttar Pradesh Legislative Assembly covering the city of Malhani in the Jaunpur District of Uttar Pradesh, India.

Malhani is one of five Assembly constituencies in the Jaunpur Lok Sabha constituency. Since 2008, this Assembly constituency is numbered 367 amongst 403 constituencies.

== Members of Legislative Assembly ==
| Year | Member | Party |
|---|---|---|
Till 2012 : Constituency did not exist
| 2012 | Parasnath Yadav | Samajwadi Party |
| 2017 | Parasnath Yadav | Samajwadi Party |
| 2020^ | Lucky Yadav | Samajwadi Party |
| 2022 | Lucky Yadav | Samajwadi Party |

^ by-election

== Election results ==
=== 2027 ===
2027 Uttar Pradesh Legislative Assembly election: Malhani
| Party | Candidate | Votes | % | ±% |
|---|---|---|---|---|
| INDIA | | | | |
| IND | Dhananjay Singh | | | |
| NDA | | | | |
| BSP | | | | |
| NOTA | None of the above | | | |
| Majority | | | | |
| Turnout | | | | |
| gain from | | Swing | | |

=== 2022 ===
2022 Uttar Pradesh Legislative Assembly election: Malhani
| Party | Candidate | Votes | % | ±% |
|---|---|---|---|---|
| SP | Lucky Yadav | 97,357 | 42.57 | +9.17 |
| JD(U) | Dhananjay Singh | 79,830 | 34.91 | |
| BSP | Shailendra Yadav | 24,007 | 10.5 | −11.66 |
| BJP | Krishna Pratap Singh K.P. | 18,319 | 8.01 | −10.75 |
| AAP | Jay Prakash | 2,697 | 1.18 | |
| NOTA | None of the above | 1,333 | 0.58 | −0.25 |
| Majority | | 17,527 | 7.66 | −2.56 |
| Turnout | | 228,695 | 60.28 | +0.24 |
| SP hold | | Swing | | |

=== 2020 ===
In the 2020 assembly by-election, Shri. Lucky Yadav, son of late Shri. Parasnath Yadav has won the MLA seat defeating Shri. Dhananjay Singh by the margin of around 4000 votes.

This seat was vacant since June 2020 due to the demise of former MLA Shri. Parasnath Yadav. Now this position has been taken by his son Shri. Lucky Yadav. Last Election Samajwadi Party candidate Parasnath Yadav won in 2017 Uttar Pradesh Legislative Elections defeating Nishad Party candidate Dhananjay Singh by a margin of 21,210 votes.

By-election, 2020: Malhani
| Party | Candidate | Votes | % | ±% |
|---|---|---|---|---|
| SP | Lucky Yadav | 73,468 | 35.45 | +1.78 |
| IND. | Dhananjay Singh | 68,836 | 33.12 | |
| BJP | Manoj Kumar Singh | 28,840 | 13.92 | +5.00 |
| BSP | Jai Prakash Dubey | 25,180 | 12.15 | −10.19 |
| INC | Rakesh Mishra Mangala Guru | 2,871 | 1.39 | |
| Majority | | 4,632 | 2.33 | −7.97 |
| Turnout | | 2,07,252 | 56.69 | −3.35 |
| SP hold | | Swing | | |

=== 2017 ===
2017 Uttar Pradesh Legislative Assembly election: Malhani
| Party | Candidate | Votes | % | ±% |
|---|---|---|---|---|
| SP | Parasnath Yadav | 69,351 | 33.4 | |
| NISHAD | Dhananjay Singh | 48,141 | 23.18 | |
| BSP | Vivek Yadav | 46,011 | 22.16 | |
| BJP | Satish Kumar Singh | 38,966 | 18.76 | |
| NOTA | None of the above | 1,707 | 0.83 | |
| Majority | | 21,210 | 10.22 | |
| Turnout | | 207,665 | 60.04 | |
