= Shyam Singh Yadav =

Indian politician (born 1954)

Member of Parliament, Lok Sabha
- In office 23 May 2019 – 2 June 2024
- Preceded by: Krishna Pratap
- Succeeded by: Babu Singh Kushwaha
- Constituency: Jaunpur, Uttar Pradesh

Personal details
- Born: 31 March 1954 (age 72) Jaunpur, Uttar Pradesh, India
- Party: Bahujan Samaj Party
- Spouse: Pushpa Yadav (m. 1986)
- Children: 2
- Education: Allahabad University: LLB (1979); MSC (Maths) Year 1976)
- Profession: Advocate; Agriculturalist; Politician

Shyam Singh Yadav (born 31 March 1954) is an Indian politician who was a Member of Parliament in the 17th Lok Sabha from Jaunpur, Uttar Pradesh. He is a member of Bahujan Samaj Party (BSP). He was the chairperson of the Parliamentary Committee on Papers laid on the Table from 2019, till 2024. He was also the member of Parliamentary Standing Committee on Coal and Steel; Parliamentary Joint Committee on Offices of Profit; former member of Parliamentary General Purposes Committee (Lok Sabha); and former member of Parliamentary Consultative Committee of the Ministry of Petroleum and Natural Gas. He is also a former PCS officer.

Yadav has represented India in international shooting events and has also coached the Indian shooting team at the Beijing Olympic Games 2008 and Melbourne Commonwealth Games 2006.

== Personal life ==
Shyam Singh Yadav was born on 31 March 1954 to father Uma Shankar Singh Yadav and mother Indrawati Yadav in Jaunpur, Uttar Pradesh. He achieved his Bachelor of Science, Master of Science (1976) and LLB (1979) degrees from Allahabad University. He married Pushpa Yadav on 11 March 1986, with whom he has a son and a daughter. He is an advocate and agriculturalist by profession. He lives in Ranipatti village in Mariahu.

== Career ==
Yadav held various posts as a civil servant.

As a former civil servant, Yadav has worked in various capacities, including sub-divisional magistrate, municipal commissioner, special secretary and vice-chairman of different development authorities.

Yadav is also an ace shooter. He has participated in a number of shooting competitions at both national and international level. He was the Indian coach of rifle shooting and has also coached Rajyavardhan Singh Rathore. He coached the Indian shooting team at the Beijing Olympic Games 2008 and Melbourne Commonwealth Games 2006. Yadav is the President of Uttar Pradesh State Rifle Association and the Vice President of Uttar Pradesh Olympic Association. He has also been the Treasurer of the National Rifle Association of India (NRAI). Was a member of Advisory Board of Censor Board in Mumbai from 2016-2019.

== Awards and achievements ==
1. Laxman Awardee U.P. Government 2000

Lok Sabha
Preceded by Krishna Pratap Singh	Member of Parliament for Jaunpur; 2019 – 2024	Succeeded by Babu Singh Kushwaha
Party political offices
Preceded by Kunwar Danish Ali	Leader of the Bahujan Samaj Party in the Lok Sabha; 8 August 2019 – 4 June 2024	Succeeded by Vacant
