= Dharmendra Kashyap =

Indian politician

Dharmendra Kumar Kashyap

Member of Parliament Lok Sabha
- In office 16 May 2014 – 4 June 2024
- Preceded by: Maneka Gandhi
- Succeeded by: Neeraj Kushwaha Maurya
- Constituency: Aonla

Personal details
- Born: 1 June 1968 (age 58) Kandharpur, Bareilly, Uttar Pradesh, India
- Party: Bharatiya Janata Party (2014-2026); Samajwadi Party (2026-present)
- Spouse: Saroj Kashyap
- Children: 2 Daughters
- Occupation: Agriculturist
- As of 17 December, 2016

Dharmendra Kashyap is a member of the Samajwadi Party. He has won the 2014 and 2019 elections from the Aonla (Lok Sabha constituency) with a BJP ticket.
