= Aonla Lok Sabha constituency =

Lok Sabha Constituency in Uttar Pradesh

Coordinates: 28.28°N 79.16°E

Aonla UP-24
- Lok Sabha constituency
- Interactive Map Outlining Aonla Lok Sabha constituency

Constituency details
- Country: India
- Region: North India
- State: Uttar Pradesh
- Assembly constituencies: Shekhupur; Dataganj; Faridpur; Bithari Chainpur; Aonla
- Established: 1962-present
- Reservation: None

Member of Parliament
- 18th Lok Sabha
- Incumbent Neeraj Kushwaha Maurya
- Party: Samajwadi Party
- Elected year: 2024

Aonla Lok Sabha constituency (Hindi pronunciation: [ãːʋlaː]) is one of the 80 Lok Sabha (parliamentary) constituencies in Uttar Pradesh state in northern India.

== Assembly segments ==
Assembly segments are:

No	Name	District	Member	Party	2024 Lead
116	Shekhupur	Budaun	Himanshu Yadav	SP	SP
117	Dataganj	Budaun	Rajeev Kumar Singh	BJP	BJP
122	Faridpur (SC)	Bareilly	Vacant	BJP	SP
123	Bithari Chainpur	Bareilly	Raghavendra Sharma	BJP	SP
126	Aonla	Bareilly	Dharmpal Singh	BJP	BJP

== Members of Parliament ==
Year	Member	Party
1962	Brij Raj Singh	Hindu Mahasabha
1967	Savitri Shyam	Indian National Congress
1971	Savitri Shyam	Indian National Congress
1977	Brij Raj Singh	Janata Party
1980	Jaipal Singh Kashyap	Janata Party (Secular)
1984	Kalyan Singh Solanki	Indian National Congress
1989	Raj Veer Singh	Bharatiya Janata Party
1991	Raj Veer Singh	Bharatiya Janata Party
1996	Sarvraj Singh	Samajwadi Party
1998	Raj Veer Singh	Bharatiya Janata Party
1999	Sarvraj Singh	Samajwadi Party
2004	Sarvraj Singh	Janata Dal (United)
2009	Maneka Gandhi	Bharatiya Janata Party
2014	Dharmendra Kashyap	Bharatiya Janata Party
2019	Dharmendra Kashyap	Bharatiya Janata Party
2024	Neeraj Kushwaha Maurya	Samajwadi Party

== Election results ==
=== General election 2024 ===
2024 Indian general elections: Aonla
Party	Candidate	Votes	%	±%
SP	Neeraj Kushwaha Maurya	492,515	45.23	▲45.23
BJP	Dharmendra Kashyap	4,76,546	43.76	▼7.31
BSP	Abid Ali	95,630	8.78	▼31.49
NOTA	None of the Above	6,858	0.63	▼0.24
Majority		15,969	1.47	▼9.33
Turnout		10,88,896	57.56	▼1.41
SP gain from BJP		Swing		

=== General election 2019 ===
2019 Indian general elections: Aonla
Party	Candidate	Votes	%	±%
BJP	Dharmendra Kumar	537,675	51.07	
BSP	Ruchi Veera	4,23,932	40.27	
INC	Kunwar Sarvraj Singh	62,548	5.94	
NOTA	None of the Above	9,198	0.87	
Majority		1,13,743	10.80	
Turnout		10,52,902	58.97	
BJP hold		Swing		

=== General election 2014 ===
2014 Indian general elections: Aonla
Party	Candidate	Votes	%	±%
BJP	Dharmendra Kumar	409,907	41.16	
SP	Kunwar Sarvraj Singh	2,71,478	27.26	
BSP	Sunita Shakya	1,90,200	19.10	
INC	Saleem Iqbal Shervani	93,861	9.43	
ABHM	Yogendra Kumar Verma	4,332	0.44	
NOTA	None of the Above	10,496	1.05	
Majority		1,38,429	13.90	
Turnout		9,95,817	60.22	
BJP hold		Swing		

== See also ==
- Bareilly district
- List of constituencies of the Lok Sabha
