= Lucky Yadav =

Indian politician

Member of the Uttar Pradesh Legislative Assembly
- Incumbent
- Assumed office 2020
- Preceded by: Parasnath Yadav
- Constituency: Malhani

Personal details
- Parent: Parasnath Yadav
- Education: Graduation
- Occupation: Politician
- Profession: Agriculture

Lucky Yadav (born 15 November 1980) is an Indian politician.

He is a member of the Samajwadi Party, and a MLA of the Eighteenth Uttar Pradesh Assembly for the Malhani Assembly constituency.

Yadav was elected in a by-election in 2020, following the death of his father (and predecessor in the seat) Parasnath Yadav. He stood for re-election in 2022, in the 2022 Uttar Pradesh Legislative Assembly election, and was re-elected.
