= Dharmpal Singh =

Indian politician

Member of Parliament, Rajya Sabha
- Incumbent
- Assumed office 26 November 2026
- Preceded by: Hardeep Singh Puri
- Constituency: Uttar Pradesh

Minister of Animal Husbandry & Dairying Government of Uttar Pradesh
- Incumbent
- Assumed office 25 March 2022
- Chief Minister: Yogi Adityanath
- Preceded by: Chaudhary Laxmi Narayan Singh

Minister of Irrigation Government of Uttar Pradesh
- In office 19 March 2017 – 21 August 2019
- Chief Minister: Yogi Adityanath
- Succeeded by: Mahendra Kumar Singh

Minister of Labour Government of Uttar Pradesh
- In office 11 October 2002 – 29 August 2003
- Chief Minister: Mayawati

Minister of Panchayat Raj Government of Uttar Pradesh
- In office 21 September 1997 – 8 March 2002
- Chief Minister: Kalyan Singh; Ram Prakash Gupta; Rajnath Singh

Minister of state for Public Works & Tourism Government of Uttar Pradesh
- In office 27 March 1997 – 20 September 1997
- Chief Minister: Mayawati
- Minister: Kalraj Mishra

Member of Uttar Pradesh Legislative Assembly
- Incumbent
- Assumed office 2012
- Preceded by: Radha Krishna
- In office 1996–2007
- Preceded by: Mahipal Yadav
- Succeeded by: Radha Krishna
- Constituency: Aonla

Personal details
- Born: 15 January 1953 (age 73) Bareilly district
- Party: Bharatiya Janata Party
- Spouse: Vandana Singh (m. 1970)
- Children: 3 sons
- Education: LLB, B.Ed
- Alma mater: M. J. P. Rohilkhand University
- Profession: Politician; teacher; farmer

Dharmpal Singh is an Indian politician and a member of the Seventeenth Legislative Assembly of Uttar Pradesh in India. He is currently the cabinet minister of irrigation and represents the Aonla constituency of Uttar Pradesh and is a member of the Bharatiya Janata Party political party.

== Early life and education ==
Dharmpal Singh was born in Bareilly district in a Lodhi family. He attended the M. J. P. Rohilkhand University and attained LL.B., BEd and MA degrees.

== Political career ==
Dharmpal Singh has been a MLA for five terms. He represented the Aonla constituency and is a member of the Bharatiya Janata Party political party.

He won his seat in the 2017 Uttar Pradesh Assembly election to Sidh raj Singh of the Samajwadi Party.

== Member of the Legislative Assembly ==
#	From	To	MLA in Assembly
01	2017	2022	Member, 17th Legislative Assembly
02	2012	2017	Member, 16th Legislative Assembly
03	2002	2007	Member, 14th Legislative Assembly
04	1996	2002	Member, 13th Legislative Assembly

== Political position ==
=== Cow ===
In May 2022, he said, "sprinkling cow urine will remove obstacles in the house", the Goddess Ganga "resides in the urine of the cow" and "Sprinkling it in the house removes vastu defects or any other obstacles". He added that Goddess Lakshmi resides in cow dung.

== See also ==
- Aonla (Assembly constituency)
- Sixteenth Legislative Assembly of Uttar Pradesh
- Uttar Pradesh Legislative Assembly
