= Azizullah Azmi =

Indian politician (1929-2010)

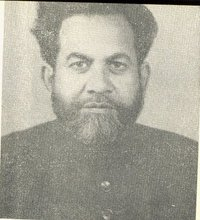

Members of the 7th Lok Sabha
- In office 1980–1984
- President: Neelam Sanjiva Reddy; Giani Zail Singh
- Prime Minister: Indira Gandhi; Rajiv Gandhi
- Constituency: Jaunpur

Personal details
- Born: April 7, 1929 Uttar Pradesh, India
- Died: 24 May 2010 (aged 81) Delhi, India
- Party: Janata Party (S)
- Spouse: Masroor Jahan Azmi
- Children: 10
- Education: Bachelor's degree
- Alma mater: Aligarh Muslim University

Azizullah Azmi (7 April 1929 – 24 May 2010), also known as A. U. Azmi, was an Indian politician who served as member of the 7th Lok Sabha from Jaunpur parliamentary constituency in 1980. He was affiliated with Janata Party (S).

== Biography ==
He was born on 7 April 1929 to Alhaj Mohammad Nazir at Bakhra village of Azamgarh district, UP. He received his education from Darul Uloom Nadwatul Ulama and later obtained bachelor's degree in Unani Medicine and Surgery (BUMS) from Aligarh Muslim University in 1956. After obtaining his medicine degree, he established All India Unani Tibbi Conference and served its president, in addition to practising medicine at Jaunpur, Uttar Pradesh. He was also associated with All India Muslim Majlis.

He was married to Masroor Jahan Azmi, with whom he had ten children, including two daughters and eight sons.
