= Girish Yadav =

Indian politician (born 1974)

Girish Chandra Yadav

Minister of State (Independent Charge) Youth Affairs & Sports Government of Uttar Pradesh
- Incumbent
- Assumed office 25 March 2022
- Chief Minister: Yogi Adityanath
- Preceded by: Upendra Tiwari

Minister of State Housing and Urban Planning Government of Uttar Pradesh
- In office 19 March 2017 – 25 March 2022
- Chief Minister: Yogi Adityanath
- Succeeded by: Rakesh Rathour

Member of Uttar Pradesh Legislative Assembly
- Incumbent
- Assumed office 2017
- Preceded by: Nadeem Javed
- Constituency: Jaunpur

Personal details
- Born: 10 January 1974 (age 52) Samaspur, Jaunpur, Uttar Pradesh
- Party: Bharatiya Janata Party
- Spouse: Sanju Yadav (m. 1990)
- Children: 2
- Parent: Savadhu Yadav (father)
- Education: L.L.B. B.Ed.
- Profession: Advocate; Agriculture

Girish Chandra Yadav (born January 10, 1974) is an Indian politician serving as the State Minister (Independent charge) in the Government of Uttar Pradesh. Born in Samaspur, Paniaria in Jaunpur, Mr. Yadav married Smt. Sanju Yadav in 1990, and together they have a son and two daughters.

Yadav is member of the Bharatiya Janata Party and is a sitting member of the U.P. Vidhan Sabha (lower house of the state legislature). Yadav is an agriculturist by profession and has a special interest in social service. He holds three bachelor's degrees: in Science, Education, Law.

== Political career ==
Yadav was appointed to the cabinet of Yogi Adityanath in March 2017. He serves as the incumbent Minister of State for Sport And Youth Welfare.

== Social media ==
Yadav is an active user of social media including Twitter on which he has more than ten thousand followers. He has written more than two thousand tweets.

== See also ==
- Yogi Adityanath ministry (2017–)
