= Krishna Pratap =

Indian politician

Member of Parliament, Lok Sabha
- In office 16 May 2014 – 23 May 2019
- Preceded by: Dhananjay Singh
- Succeeded by: Shyam Singh Yadav
- Constituency: Jaunpur

Personal details
- Born: 9 February 1977 (age 49) Jaunpur, Uttar Pradesh, India
- Party: Bharatiya Janata Party
- Spouse: Reena Singh (m. 2005)
- Children: Rudra Pratap Singh and Kritika Singh
- Parents: Umanath Singh (father); Susheela Singh (mother)
- Education: Doctor of Philosophy
- Alma mater: Veer Bahadur Singh Purvanchal University
- Profession: Agriculturist, Politician

Krishna Pratap Singh (born 9 February 1977) is a member of the Bharatiya Janata Party and won the 2014 Indian general elections from the Jaunpur (Lok Sabha constituency).

== Early life and education ==
Krishna Pratap Singh was born on 9 February 1977 to Shri Umanath Singh and Smt. Susheela Singh. He was born in Jaunpur in Uttar Pradesh. His educational qualifications include Ph.D. and he received his education from T.D.P.G. College, Jaunpur and Purwanchal University Jaunpur, Uttar Pradesh. He married Reena Singh on 23 November 2005.

== Political career ==
- May 2014: Elected to 16th Lok Sabha
- 1 September 2014 onwards: Member, Standing Committee on Chemicals and Fertilizers; Member, Consultative Committee, Ministry of Water Resources, River Development and Ganga Rejuvenation
