= Chinmayanand (politician) =

Former Union Minister of State for Home Affairs

Swami Chinmayanand
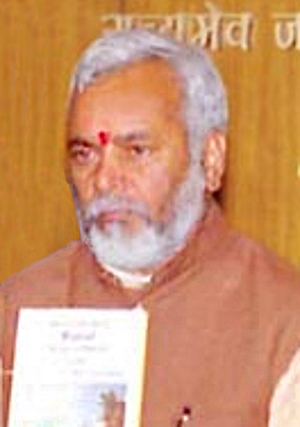

Member of the Indian Parliament for 10th Lok Sabha from Badaun in Uttar Pradesh
- In office 1991–1996

Member of the Indian Parliament for 12th Lok Sabha from Machhlishahr in Uttar Pradesh
- In office 1998–1999

Member of the Indian Parliament for 13th Lok Sabha from Jaunpur, Uttar Pradesh
- In office 1999–2003

Swami Chinmayanand (born Krishna Pal Singh) is a former union minister from the Indian state of Uttar Pradesh. He was minister of state for internal affairs in third Vajpayee ministry. He was elected to 13th Lok Sabha from Jaunpur in Uttar Pradesh as a Bharatiya Janata Party candidate in 1999. He was member of 10th Lok Sabha from Badaun in 1991 and from Machhlishahr in 1998.

He is also credited with amicably resolving the dispute of Armed rebellion for Bodo land in the North Eastern region. After he assumed the charge of Minister of State in Vajpayee Ministry, his efforts to reinstate peace in North Eastern region were widely appreciated in 2003. He also strived for the inclusion of Bodo language in the eighth schedule of Indian Constitution which was added through 92nd Constitutional Amendment in 2003.

== Rape allegations, arrest and acquittal ==
In August 2019, a female student at a college run by him posted a video alleging sexual exploitation by Swami Chinmayanand. He was arrested after the girl allegedly went missing. He was charged for misusing authority for sex, stalking, wrongful confinement and criminal intimidation. In response to the allegations, He alleged that the woman had attempted to extort money from him. She was arrested in connection with his complaint and is currently in custody. The case against Chinmayanand and the woman are pending.

In February 2020, Chinmayanand was granted bail, but was re-arrested in July 2020. The head of the Special Investigative Tribunal stated to press that Chinmayanand had admitted to asking the student to massage him. He has been charged with offences including sexual exploitation and criminal intimidation.

In February 2024, Swami Chinmayanand was acquitted by the MP MLA Court in Shahjahanpur in cases levelled against him.
