= Sarvraj Singh =

Indian politician

Kunwar Aditya

Member of Parliament of Lok Sabha
- In office 1999–2009
- Preceded by: Raj Veer Singh
- Succeeded by: Maneka Gandhi
- Constituency: Aonla

Personal details
- Born: 14 August 1952 (age 73) Bareilly, Uttar Pradesh, India
- Party: Indian National Congress
- Spouse: Saloni Singh (m.1978)
- Children: 2
- As of 17 September, 2006

Kunwar Sarvraj Singh (born 14 August 1952) is an Indian politician for the Aonla (Lok Sabha Constituency) in Uttar Pradesh during the eleventh, thirteenth, and fourteenth Lok Sabha. He was first elected as a member of the Samajwadi Party.
