= Dhananjay Singh =

Indian politician

Member of Parliament, Lok Sabha
- In office 16 May 2009 – 16 May 2014
- Preceded by: Parasnath Yadav
- Succeeded by: Krishna Pratap Singh
- Constituency: Jaunpur

Member of Uttar Pradesh Legislative Assembly
- In office 2002–2009
- Preceded by: Shriram Yadav
- Succeeded by: Rajdeva Singh Chandel
- Constituency: (Rari) Malhani

Personal details
- Born: 16 July 1975 (age 51) Bansafa Village, Jaunpur, India
- Party: Janata Dal (United) (2022-present)
- Other political affiliations: Janata Dal (United) (2007-2009); Bahujan Samaj Party (2009-2012)
- Spouse(s): Meenu Singh (2006-2007); Jagriti Singh (2009-17); Srikala Reddy (2017- present)
- Parent: Rajdeva Singh Chandel (father)
- Education: University of Lucknow
- Occupation: Politician, businessperson

Dhananjay Singh Chandel (Hindi: धनंजय सिंह चन्देल), commonly known as Dhananjay Singh, is an Indian Gangster turned politician and former Member of Parliament from Jaunpur, Uttar Pradesh.

He served as a two-times MLA and represented the Jaunpur constituency in the 15th Lok Sabha from 2009 to 2014. On 17 October 1998, police reports claimed that he had been killed in an encounter. However, he resurfaced alive four months later and subsequently surrendered before a court. Throughout his political career, Dhananjay emained a controversial figure, with his name being linked to several criminal cases and legal proceedings, and frequently mentioned by the Indian media as a "Criminal who came back from dead", "Bahubali" and "mafia-turned-politician". He was convicted in a kidnapping and extortion case in 2024 and was subsequently granted bail.

== Early life and career ==
Dhananjay Singh was born on 16 July 1975 in Bansafa village in Jaunpur district, Uttar Pradesh, India. His father name is Rajdeva Singh, who was a Government Teacher. He belongs to the Chandel clan. Jaunpur is dominated by the Chandelas, This helped Dhananjay move forward, and also supported him during his early days of struggles and disputes in other villages. Dhananjay completed his intermediate education at T.D. College, Jaunpur. According to the Lok Sabha, he is also involved in business and farming. He graduated from University of Lucknow in political science.

== Personal life ==
Singh married his first wife, Meenu, on 12 December 2006. She died ten months later on 12 September 2007. Family members claimed that she committed suicide. He married his second wife, Dr. Jagriti Singh, on 29 June 2009. After mutual disagreement, they separated and he married his third wife, Srikala Reddy, a BJP politician, in 2017. She won the Jaunpur zila panchayat (district council) chairperson poll in July 2021.

== Crime and Politics ==
Dhananjay Singh first became known as a student leader when he attended Tilak Dhari (TD) College in Jaunpur. In the late 1990s, he studied at Lucknow University and graduated with a master's in political science, and also started gaining notoriety around this time for his involvement in gang activity. His opposition to the Mandal Commission recommendations increased his political popularity. Between 1996 and 2013, Singh had been charged four times under the Gangster Act.

In October 1998, it was claimed by police that they killed Singh in an encounter in Bhadohi while he was robbing a petrol pump. However, he appeared in public alive four months later, leading to an investigation that filed cases on up to 34 officers for the false claim.

In 2002 he was elected as MLA from Rari now Malhani constituency, Jaunpur district in the Uttar Pradesh Legislative Assembly from 2002 to 2009 as an independent candidate. In 2007, he was again elected as an MLA from the aforesaid constituency on the Janta Dal (United) ticket. In 2009 Indian General Elections, he was elected as Member of Parliament (MP) in the 15th Lok Sabha as a Bahujan Samaj Party (BSP) member.

Up to 2024, Singh has 41 criminal cases to his record, with ten still pending and others being dismissed or acquitted in, partially due to witnesses who later backed out.
