= Jaunpur Assembly constituency =

Constituency of the Uttar Pradesh legislative assembly in India

Coordinates: 25.75°N 82.68°E

Jaunpur
- Constituency No. 366 for the Uttar Pradesh Legislative Assembly

Constituency details
- Country: India
- Region: North India
- State: Uttar Pradesh
- District: Jaunpur
- Total electors: 4,35,634
- Reservation: None

Member of Legislative Assembly
- 18th Uttar Pradesh Legislative Assembly
- Incumbent Girish Chandra Yadav
- Party: Bharatiya Janta Party
- Elected year: 2017

Jaunpur is a constituency of the Uttar Pradesh Legislative Assembly covering the city of Jaunpur in the Jaunpur district of Uttar Pradesh, India.

Jaunpur is one of five assembly constituencies in the Jaunpur Lok Sabha constituency. Since 2008, this assembly constituency is numbered 366 amongst 403 constituencies.

== Members of Legislative Assembly ==
Election	Name	Party
1957	Yadavendra Dutt Dubey	Bharatiya Jana Sangh
1962	Yadavendra Dutt Dubey	Bharatiya Jana Sangh
1967	Kailashpati	Indian National Congress
1969	Jang Bahadur Yadav	Bharatiya Jana Sangh
1974	Om Prakash	Indian National Congress
1977	Kamla Prasad Singh	Indian National Congress
1980	Kamla Prasad Singh	Indian National Congress
1985	Chandrasen	Lokdal
1989	Arjun Singh Yadav	Independent
1991	Lal Chand	Janata Dal
1993	Mohammad Arshad Khan	Bahujan Samaj Party
1996	Afzal Ahmad	Samajwadi Party
2002	Surendra Pratap Singh	Bharatiya Janata Party
2007	Javed Ansari	Samajwadi Party
2012	Nadeem Javed	Indian National Congress
2017	Girish Yadav	Bharatiya Janata Party
2022	Girish Yadav	Bharatiya Janata Party

== Election results ==
=== 2027 ===
2027 Uttar Pradesh Legislative Assembly election: Jaunpur
Party	Candidate	Votes	%	±%
INDIA				
NDA				
BSP				
NOTA	None of the above			
Majority				
Turnout				
gain from		Swing		

=== 2022 ===
2022 Uttar Pradesh Legislative Assembly election: Jaunpur
Party	Candidate	Votes	%	±%
BJP	Girish Yadav	97,760	39.35	−0.69
SP	Mohd. Arshad Khan	89,708	36.11	
BSP	Saleem Khan	30,579	12.31	−6.25
INC	Nadeem Javed	12,150	4.89	−29.71
AIMIM	Abhayraj	6,228	2.51	
VIP	Anjoo	2,445	0.98	
NOTA	None of the above	542	0.22	−0.65
Majority		8,052	3.24	−2.2
Turnout		248,447	57.03	−0.72
BJP hold		Swing		

=== 2017 ===
Bharatiya Janta Party candidate Girish Chandra Yadav won in 2017 Uttar Pradesh Legislative Elections defeating Indian National Congress candidate Nadeem Javed by a margin of 12,284 votes.

2017 Uttar Pradesh Legislative Assembly Election: Jaunpu
Party	Candidate	Votes	%	±%
BJP	Girish Chandra Yadav	90,324	40.04	
INC	Nadeem Javed	78,040	34.6	
BSP	Dinesh Tandan	41,877	18.56	
NISHAD	Sher Bahadur	5,797	2.57	
NOTA	None of the above	1,939	0.87	
Majority		12,284	5.44	
Turnout		225,577	57.75	
