= Atala Mosque, Jaunpur =

Mosque in Jaunpur, Uttar Pradesh, India

Atala Mosque
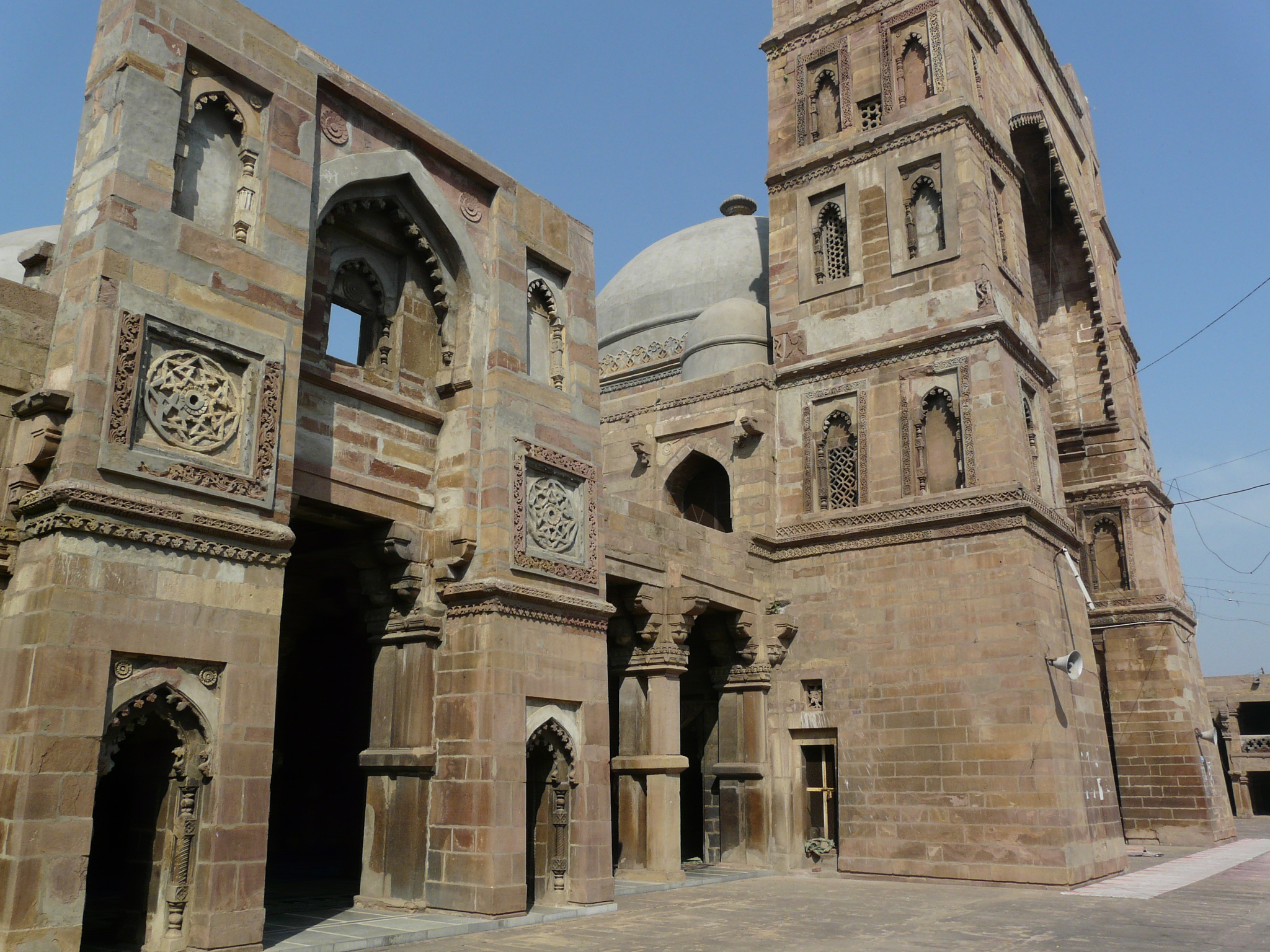
- Main pishtaq leading into the iwan of the mosque

- Location of the mosque in Uttar Pradesh

Religion
- Affiliation: Islam
- Ecclesiastical or organisational status: Mosque
- Status: Active

Location
- Location: Shahi Qila fort, Jaunpur, Uttar Pradesh
- Country: India
- Coordinates: 25°45′9.54″N 82°41′26.22″E

Architecture
- Type: Mosque architecture
- Style: Indo-Islamic; Sharqi
- Groundbreaking: 1376 CE
- Completed: 1408 CE

Specifications
- Height (max): 30 m (98 ft)
- Dome: One (maybe more)

The Atala Mosque, also known as the Atala Masjid, is a 15th-century mosque in Jaunpur, in the state of Uttar Pradesh, India.

The mosque is situated 300 metres (330 yd) from Shahi Qila (English: Royal Fort); 1 kilometre (1,100 yd) from the Jama Mosque; 2.2 kilometres (1.4 mi) north-northeast of Jaunpur; 7.3 kilometres (4.5 mi) northwest of Zafarābād; 16.8 kilometres (10.4 mi) north-northeast of Mariāhū; and 26.3 kilometres (16.3 mi) west-northwest of Kirākat.

== Architecture ==
William Hodges sketched the mosque when he visited Jaunpur, and included the skitch in his book Selected Views in India, Drawn on the Spot, in the Years 1780, 1781, 1782 and 1783, and Executed in Aqua Tinta.

The entire mosque covers a square of 78.5 metres (258 ft) on each side. There are three huge gateways for the entrance. The height of the mosque is more than 30 metres (100 ft), and the total perimeter is 76 metres (248 ft). The central dome is almost 17 metres (56 ft) above the ground, but cannot be seen from the front because of the tall 23-metre (75 ft) tower.

== Gallery ==
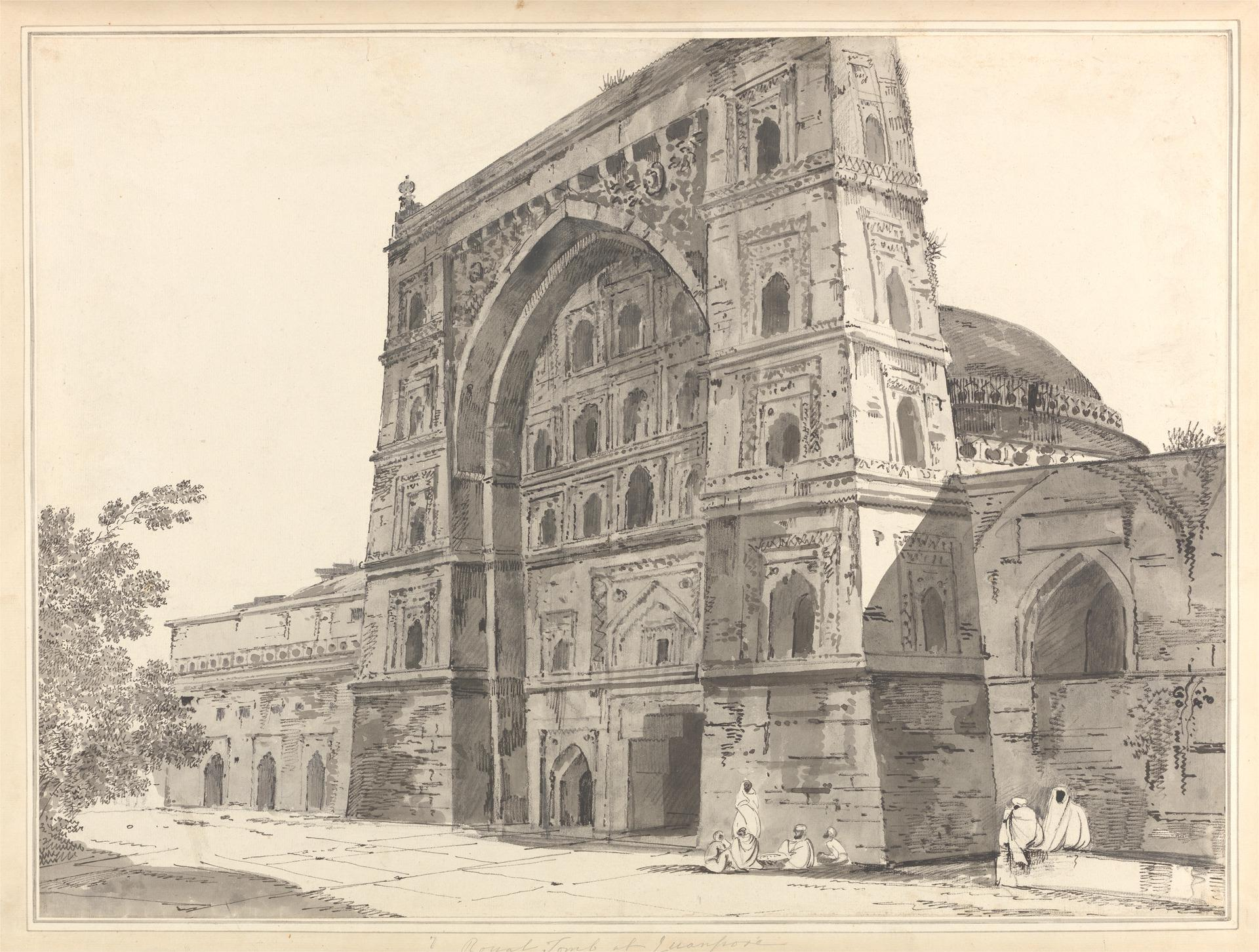
Original wash drawing

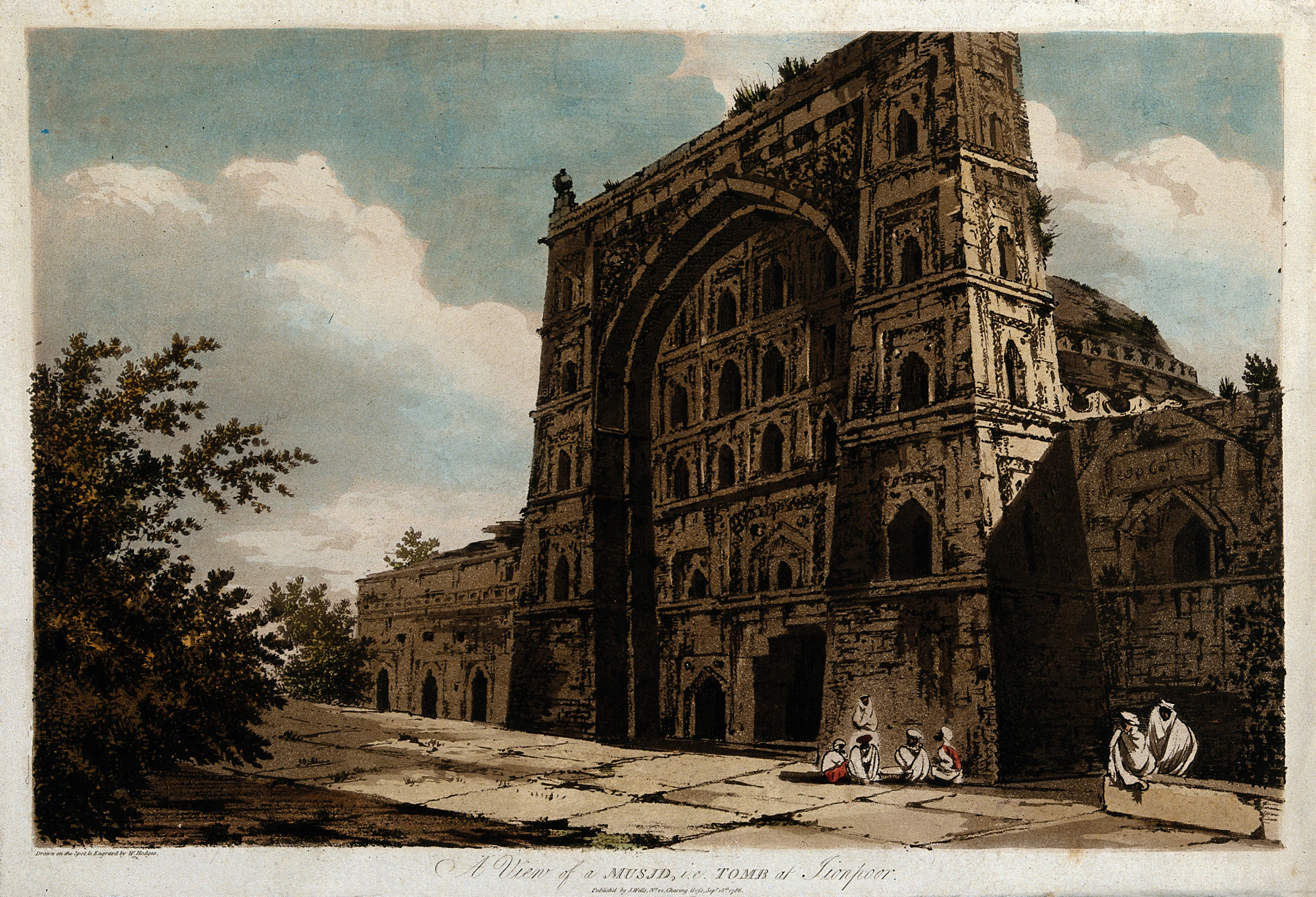
Coloured etching

== See also ==
- Islam in India
- List of mosques in India
- Shahi Bridge, Jaunpur

== Sources ==
- Michell, George (ed). Architecture of the Islamic World: Its History and Social Meaning. London: Thames and Hudson, 272.
- Nath, R. 1978. History of Sultanate Architecture. New Delhi, Abhinav Publications, 98-100.
- Williams, John A. and Caroline. 1980. Architecture of Muslim India. Set 4: The Sultanate of Jaunpur about 1360-1480. Santa Barbara, California: Visual Education, Inc.
