= Jhanjhari Masjid =

Mosque in Jaunpur, Uttar Pradesh, India

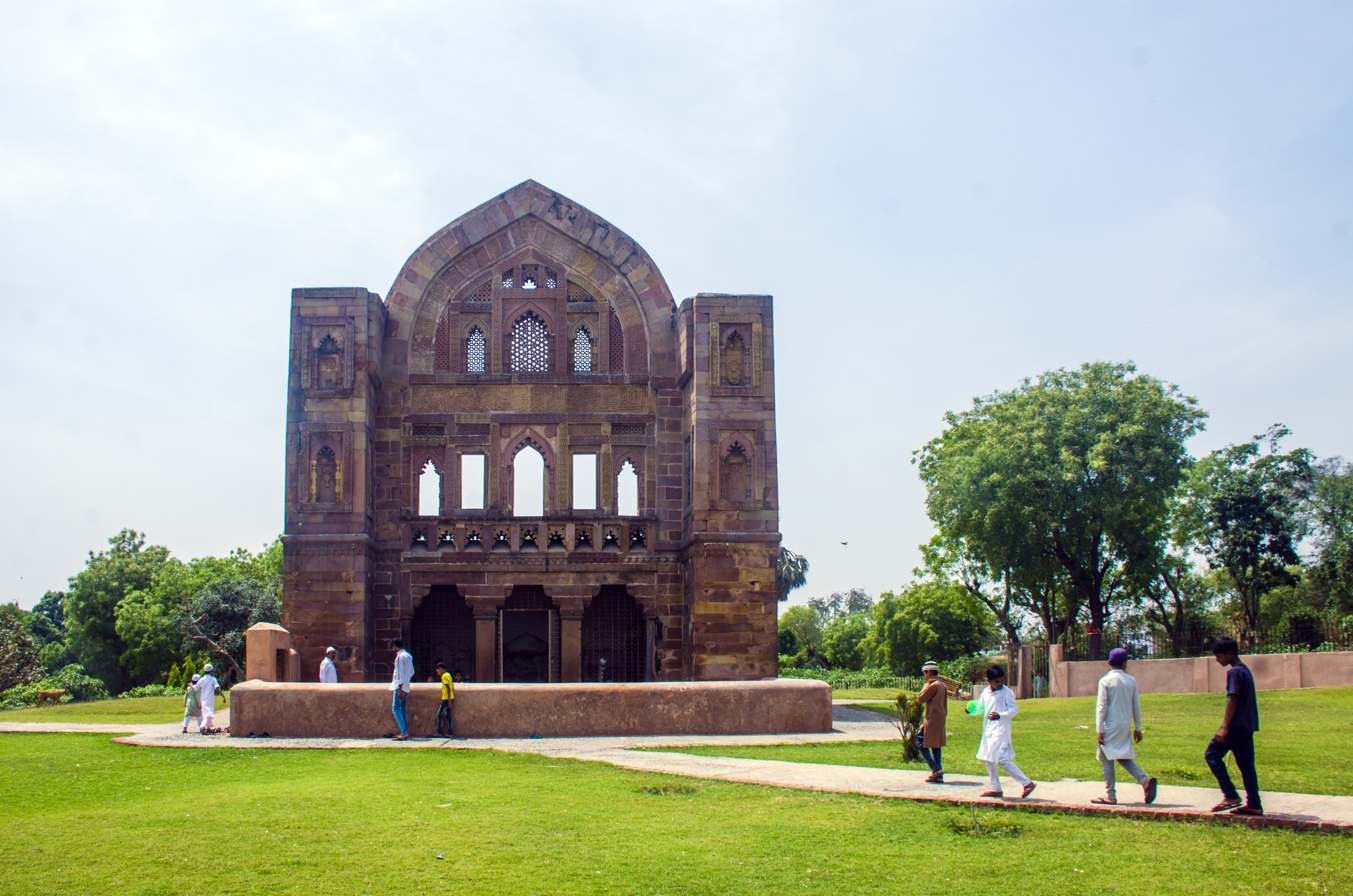
- The mosque in 2023

- Location of the mosque in Uttar Pradesh

Religion
- Affiliation: Islam
- Ecclesiastical or organizational status: Mosque
- Status: Active

Location
- Location: Jaunpur, Uttar Pradesh
- Country: India
- Interactive map of Jhanjhari Masjid
- Coordinates: 25°44′36″N 82°42′02″E

Architecture
- Type: Mosque architecture
- Style: Sharqi
- Founder: Ibrahim Shah
- Completed: 1430 CE

The Jhanjhari Masjid, also known as the Jhanjhari Mosque, is a mosque located in Jaunpur, in the state of Uttar Pradesh, India. Located in the Sipah area of Jaunpur on the banks of the river Gomti, the mosque was constructed in 1430 CE by Ibrahim Shah, the ruler of the Jaunpur Sultanate.

== History ==
The mosque was commissioned by Ibrahim Shah during the reign of the Jaunpur Sultanate. It was built in honour of Hazrat Said Sadr Jahan Ajmali.

A significant portion of this mosque was demolished by Sikandar Lodi and the stones were used in construction of other monuments, most notably, the Shahi bridge. The mosque suffered further damage by floods of the river Gomti.

== Description ==
It consists of a towering arched gateway upon which are Arabic inscriptions in the Tughra script. An excerpt from Surah Baqara is inscribed on the two sides of the arch, and a hadith is inscribed on the base of the pointed arch.

== Gallery ==
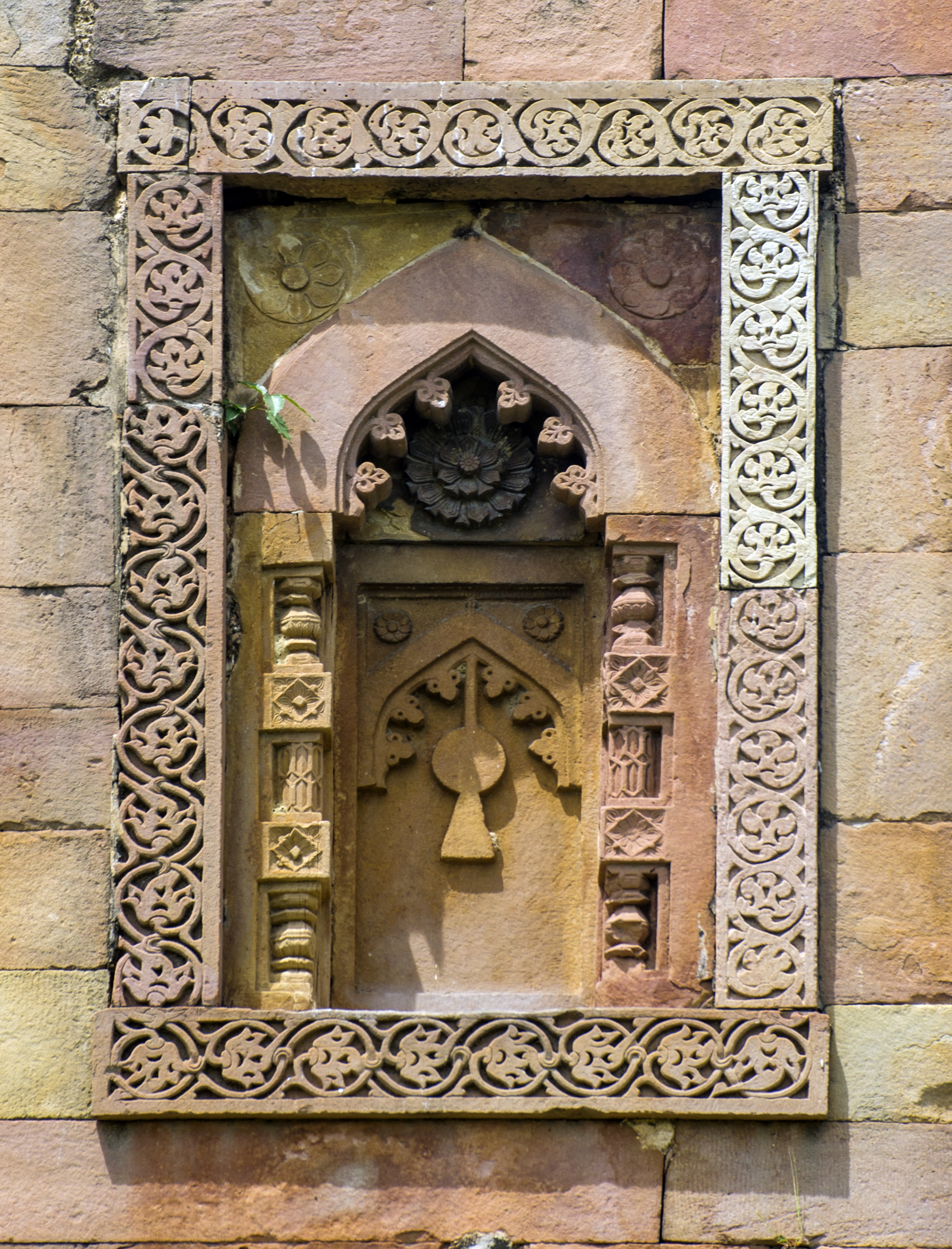
Ornamentation

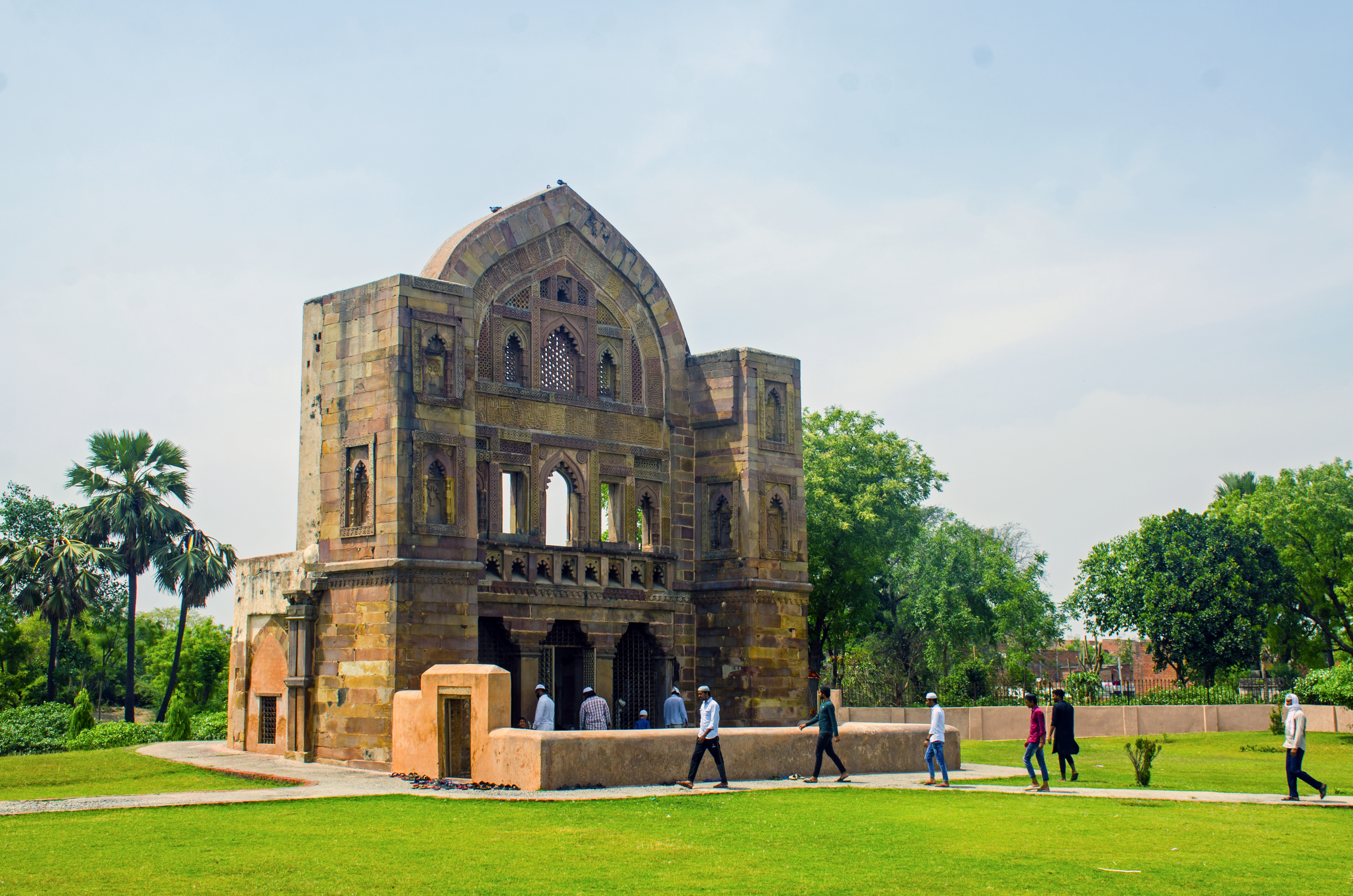
Side view

== See also ==
- Islam in India
- List of mosques in India
