= Jama Mosque, Jaunpur =

Mosque in Jaunpur, Uttar Pradesh, India

Jama Masjid
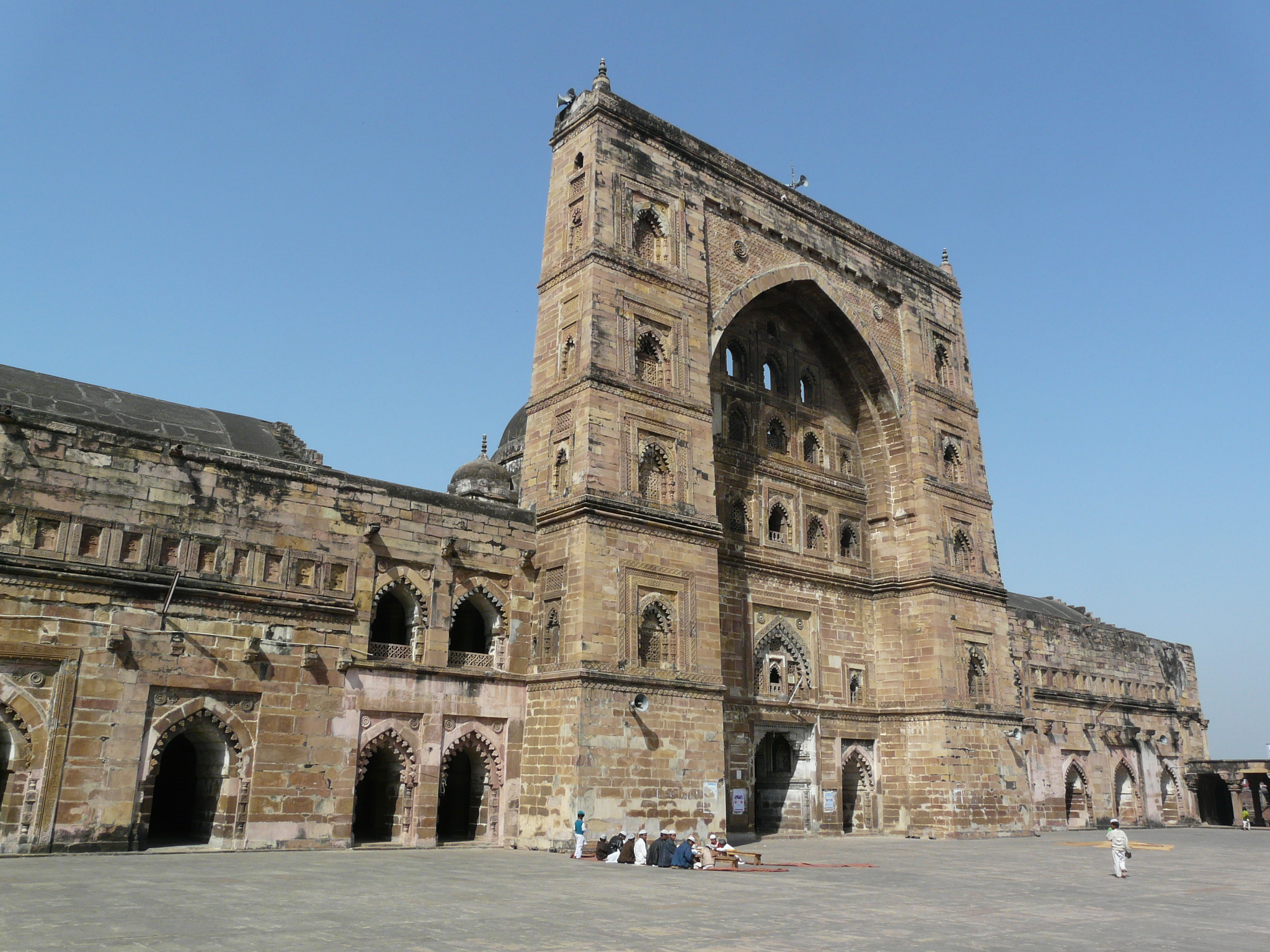

Religion
- Affiliation: Islam
- District: Jaunpur
- Ecclesiastical or organizational status: Masjid

Location
- Location: Jaunpur, Uttar Pradesh, India
- Interactive map of Jama Masjid
- Territory: Uttar Pradesh
- Coordinates: 25°45′32.41″N 82°41′6.23″E

Architecture
- Architect: Husain Shah Sharki
- Type: Mosque
- Style: Islamic, Jaunpur architecture, Indo-Islamic architecture
- Completed: 1470
- Dome dia. (inner): 11.4m

Jama Masjid, also known as Jama Mosque, Jami Masjid or Badi Masjid, one of the largest mosques in India, is a 15th-century mosque built by Hussain Shah Sharqi of the Jaunpur Sultanate in Jaunpur, Uttar Pradesh, India. It is one of the chief tourist attractions in Jaunpur. The mosque is 2.2 km north-northeast of Jaunpur, 7.3 km northwest of Zafarābād, 16.8 km north-northeast of Mariāhū, 26.3 km west-northwest of Kirākat. It is 1 km from the Atala mosque.

Special prayers are held every Friday. The five regular prayers are offered every day.

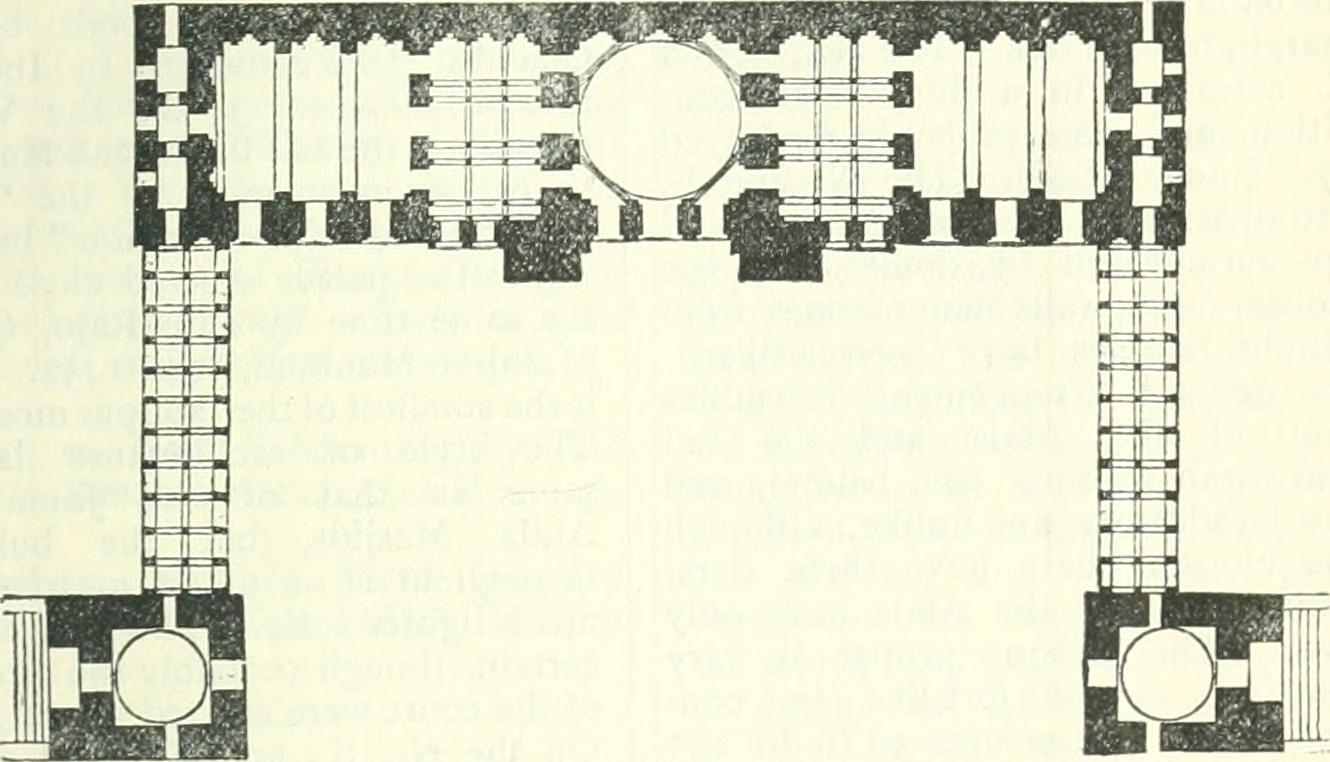
Plan of Western Half of Jami Masjid Jaunpur India

== History ==
The mosque was built by the Sharqi dynasty of the Shia Jaunpur Sultanate in the 15th century. The dynasty was established by the powerful eunuch Malik Sarwar (also known as Malik-as-Sharq, meaning "peer of the east") in Jaunpur after the decline in Tughlaq dynasty power, precipitated by both internal decline due to factors such as profligate spending by Firuz Tughlaq and by the sack of Delhi by Timur in 1398. Malik-as-Sharq seized control of Jaunpur, a city founded in 1360 by Firuz Shah near a Hindu town whose temples he desecrated, in 1394 and declared himself an independent Sultan in 1398 after the sack of Delhi. The Jaunpur Sultanate controlled territory in the Bihar and Uttar Pradesh regions of India and was a cultural center of Islam, known as Shiraz-e-Hind (the Shiraz of India), in India with its rulers being important patrons of the arts who created what is arguably distinctive style of architecture.

The foundation of the mosque was laid in 1438 by Ibrahim Shah but the first steps of construction above ground level only began in 1440 with his death. The purpose for its construction is unknown but two prevalent stories are that Ibrahim Shah constructed the mosque to save a hermit from having to walk barefoot to a far off mosque or that he created it to boost employment during a famine. The complex was built in stages but was finally completed in 1473 by the final Sharqi Monarch Hussain Shah.

After being at peace during the Sayyid dynasty, the rise of the Lodi dynasty in Delhi caused several wars between Hussain Shah Sharqi and both Bahlul Lodi and Sikandar Lodi, which led to the fall of the Jaunpur Sultanate to the Delhi Sultanate. In most sources, these wars cause Sikandar Lodi to destroy or damage most of Hussain Shah's public works including the East Gate of the Jama Mosque, almost the entirety of the Jhanjri Mosque, and the majority of non-religious Sharqi buildings. In contrast to this view, Ram Nath argues that Sikandar Lodi's status as a devout Muslim precluded him from damaging mosques and that the absence of non-religious buildings is due to their not having ever existed on account of Sharqi incompetence.

=== Under the British ===
The Jama Mosque as well as other elements of Jaunpur's architecture were reinterpreted under British rule. In 1783, William Hodges made a sketch of the entrance of the mosque, published in his book Select Views in India. Hodges was influenced by the picturesque school of painters that focused on the importance of ruins and numerous paintings focused on ruins surrounded by nature.

Within the Indian context this focus on ruins contributed to a portrayal of India as a civilization in decline. Michael S. Dodson argues that while the picturesque painters used this theme to speculate about the impermanence of the British Empire a latent aspect of the identification of India with ruin was the idea that the colonial government should take charge of restoration. This second idea gained in prominence as the colonial government carried out numerous surveys of India such as those of the Architectural Survey of India (ASI). The latter was carried out a detailed survey by Albert Führer on Jaunpur's architecture, including the Jama Mosque. This trend, according to Dodson, culminated in George Curzon's passing of the Ancient Monuments Preservation Act 1904 which included the Jama Mosque under its jurisdiction in 1919 but did not include other, less monumental works.

At that time, there was no daytime adhan in Jaunpur, it could only be heard with the rising and setting of the sun. Karamat Ali Jaunpuri reformed this un-Islamic ritual and with great effort issued adhan in Jaunpur's mosques. There were also concerns behind the management of the historic Jama Mosque. Instead of adhan and prayers, this mosque was used for worldly gatherings like baraat, clubbing and marriage ceremonies regardless oreligion. Cattle were also tied in some parts of the Jama Mosque. It continued for many years after until Jaunpuri managed to re-establish the five daily prayers at the mosque. Similarly, after Jama Masjid Jaunpur, he started a series of Friday sermons which continued for many years after his death. Due to his preaching efforts, attempts were made to kill him several times but he escaped due to his skill in martial arts.

== Architecture ==
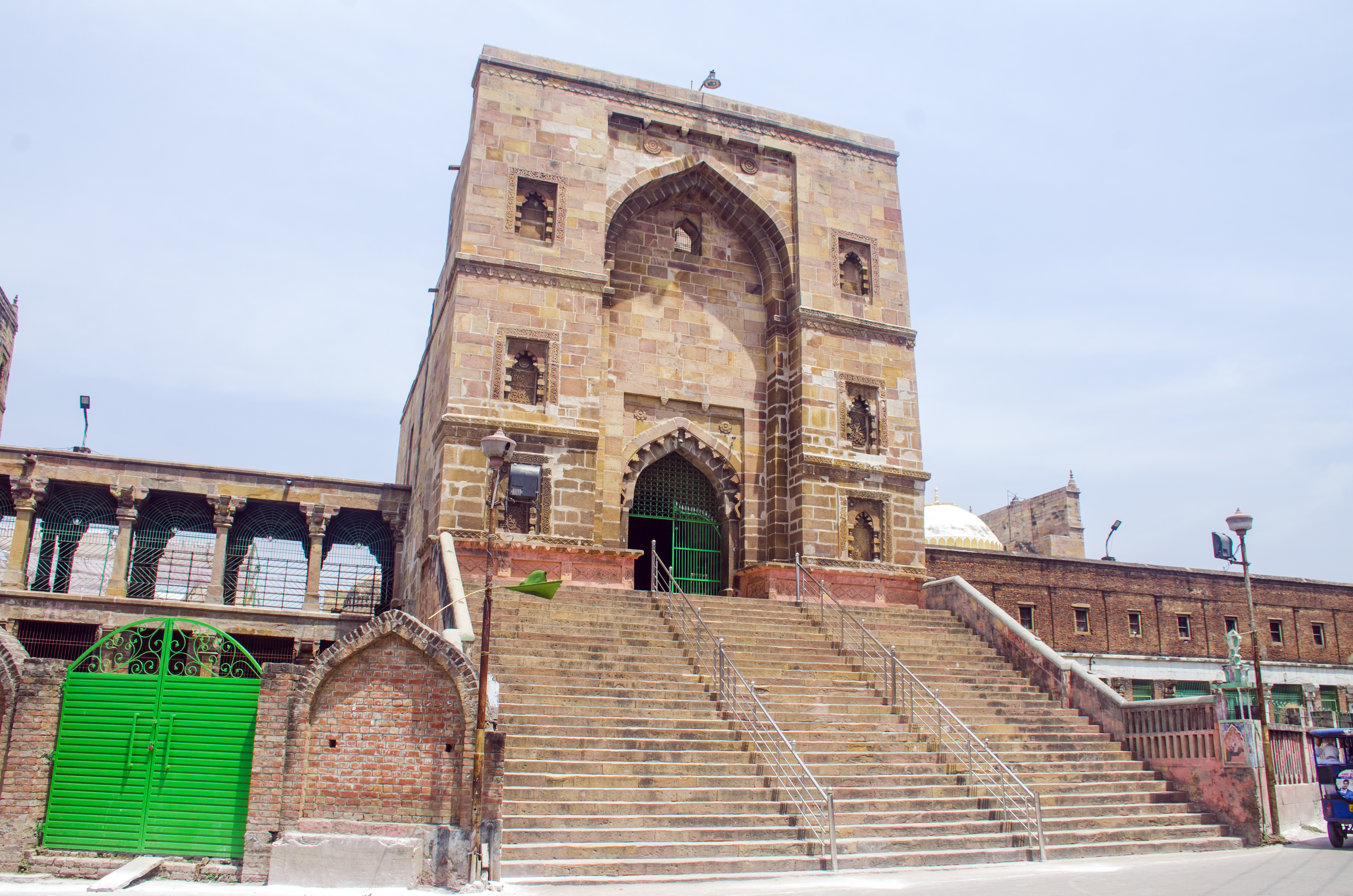
Southern gaate of Jaunpur Jama Masjid

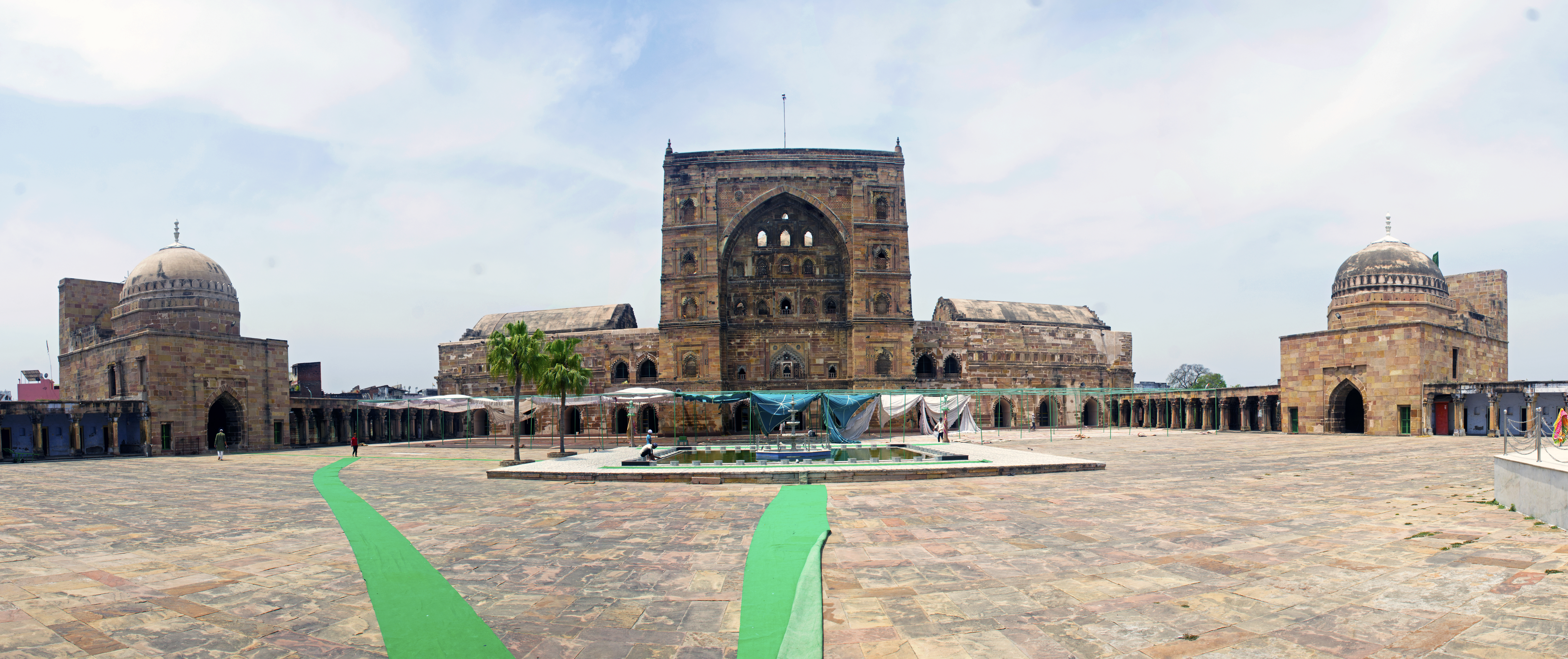
Panoramic view of the compoind of Jaunpur Jama Masjid

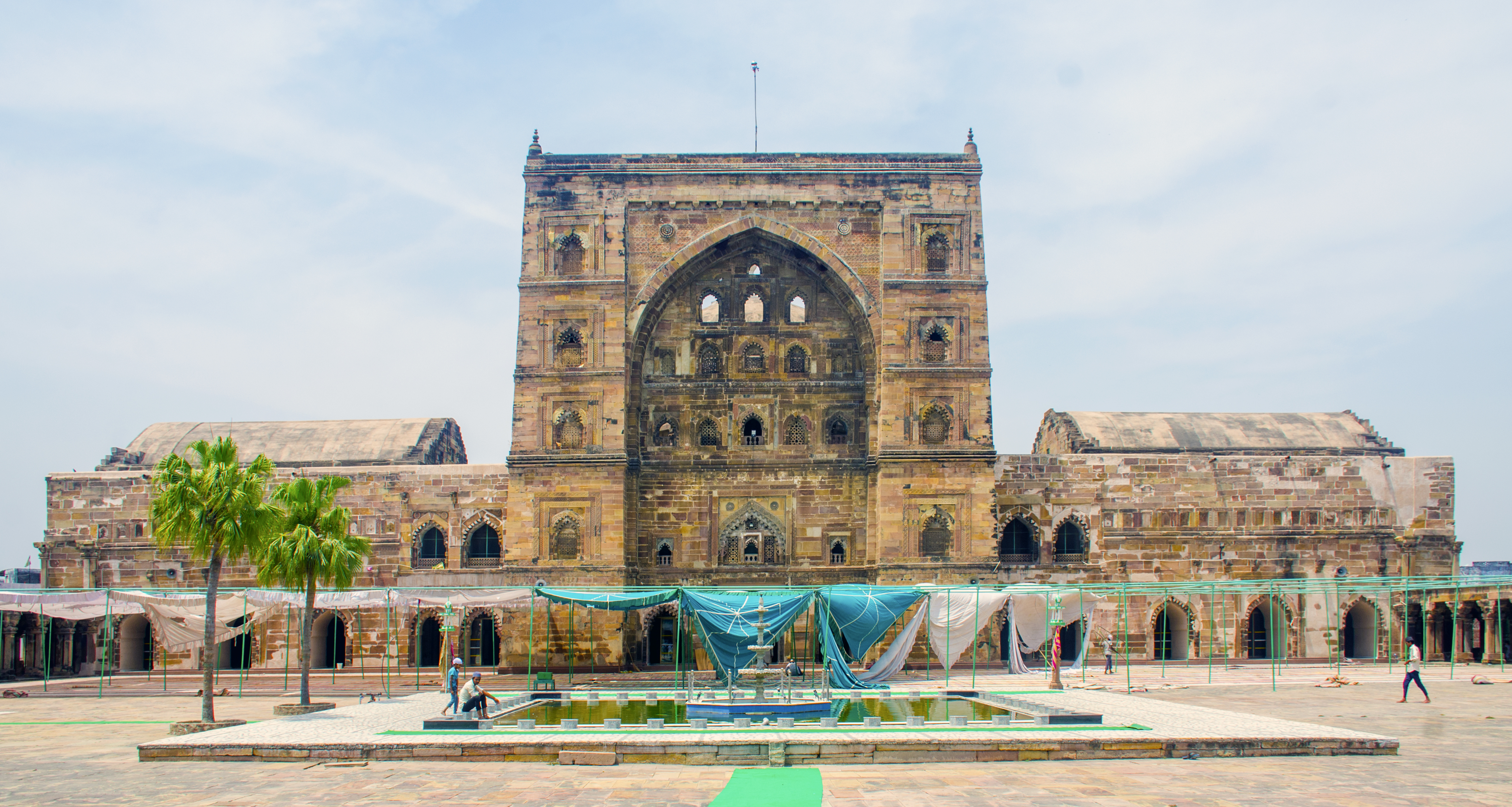
Compound of Jaunpur Jama Masjid

The Jama Mosque is one of the three most famous mosques in Jaunpur, the others being the Atala Mosque and the Lal Darwaza Mosque. Of these it is both the largest and most recent. The Jama Mosque and the Lal Darwaza Mosque are heavily based upon the model of the Atala Mosque. According to Michael S. Dodson the focus of this style is the enormous and visually dominating pishtaq (portal) which obscures the dome behind it. All mosques in this style are arranged around a courtyard with four large gateways facing North, South, East, and West. The most significant of these faces West (towards Mecca) and contains the pishtaq and dome.

The mosque is built on a base that is nearly 20 feet high and is accessible by a flight of steps. This fact distinguishes it from the Atala Mosque which has no base and is similar to many mosques in Delhi with such a base. Although the general style is influenced by Delhi, some of the arches flanking the pishtaq are believed to be derived from Bengal. The courtyard is surrounded on all sides by cloisters that A. A. Führer claims were two stories high before the second story was destroyed by Sikandar Lodi when he conquered Jaunpur. In the west wall are several mihrabs, each of which are flanked by ornately carved plates. The pishtaq is over 200 feet tall and the dome behind it is 38 feet in diameter. On each side of the portal are two dominating propylons 70 feet long decorated with several arches. The mosque is made of brick, some of which was gathered from pre-existing Hindu temples. Although the general style of the Sharqis contains minimal ornamentation some of these fragments of Hindu temples were heavily ornamented.

A. A. Führer's survey of the mosque notes several Greek elements such as Greek crosses. This may tie into the project of Orientalist James Prinsep, creator of the AIS (Führer's patron organization), to argue that Indian artistic traditions were derivative of Greek art.

The entire Sharqi royal family is unostentatiously buried near the mosque. This lack of sepulchral architecture, as opposed to the Lodi dynasty is interpreted by Abha Narain Lambah as symbolizing the military simplicity of the Sharqi monarchs. It is interpreted by Ram Nath as evidence of the lack of concern by the Sharqis with non-religious or military architecture, evidencing what he sees to be the lack of a distinct Jaunpuri style of architecture.

=== Inscriptions ===
The Jama Mosque contains several inscriptions. Around the central mihrab are two Quranic verses, one from the Surah Al-Fath in Tughra characters describing conversion and one from the Surah Al-Baqara in Arabic characters praising the omnipotence of Allah. Another inscription is a 6th-century Sanskrit text from Maukhari dynasty. It was originally attributed to Iśvaravarman but Hans Bakker argues that it actually comes from the reign of his son Iśanavarman. The inscription describes and praises the first four Maukhari rulers. The presence of this inscription speaks to the reuse of local Hindu materials in the construction of mosques.

=== Analysis ===
Abha Narain Lambah argues that the Jama Mosque functioned as a continuation and fulfillment of the Tughlaq style of architecture. He cites the general layout of Tughlaq mosques, the general sparseness of decoration, and the prominent pashtaq. He remarks on the unadorned militaristic style of the architecture, something he sees as speaking to the militaristic character of the Tughlaqs and Sharqis. This interpretation is part of a broader project of seeing the architecture of pre-Mughal sultanates as being a period of architectural diversity of style.

Ram Nath also remarks on militaristic style, comparing the cloisters to barracks. However, he considers it out of place in the mosque. He also considers the monumentality of the pishtaq obscuring the dome to be a mistake. Generally he considers the Jama Mosque to be a series of failed experiments with a pre-existing style, rather than a new distinct style. He considers the value of the mosque to be in the individual stonework, which he attributes to local craftsmen or previous Hindu temples that stones for the mosques were taken from.

== Miscellany ==
Bernard O'Kane, Professor of Islamic Art and Architecture at the American University in Cairo, included the Jama Mosque in his book Mosques: the 100 Most Iconic Islamic Houses of Worship.

== See also ==
- Shahi Bridge, Jaunpur
- Atala Masjid, Jaunpur

== Notes ==
- Nath, R. 1978. History of Sultanate Architecture. New Delhi, Abhinav Publications, 102–104.
- Williams, John A. and Caroline. 1980. Architecture of Muslim India. Set 4: The Sultanate of Jaunpur, about 1360–1480. Santa Barbara, California: Visual Education, Inc.
