= Dhannopur =

Coordinates: 25°46′N 82°41′E

Dhannupur is a village in jaunpur, Uttar Pradesh, India.
