= Gauryadih =

Village in Jaunpur, Uttar Pradesh, India

Gauryadih is a village in Jaunpur, Uttar Pradesh, India.
