= Agraura =

Coordinates: 25°51′N 82°31′E

Agraura is a village in Jaunpur, Uttar Pradesh, India.
