= Islamic Welfare Society =

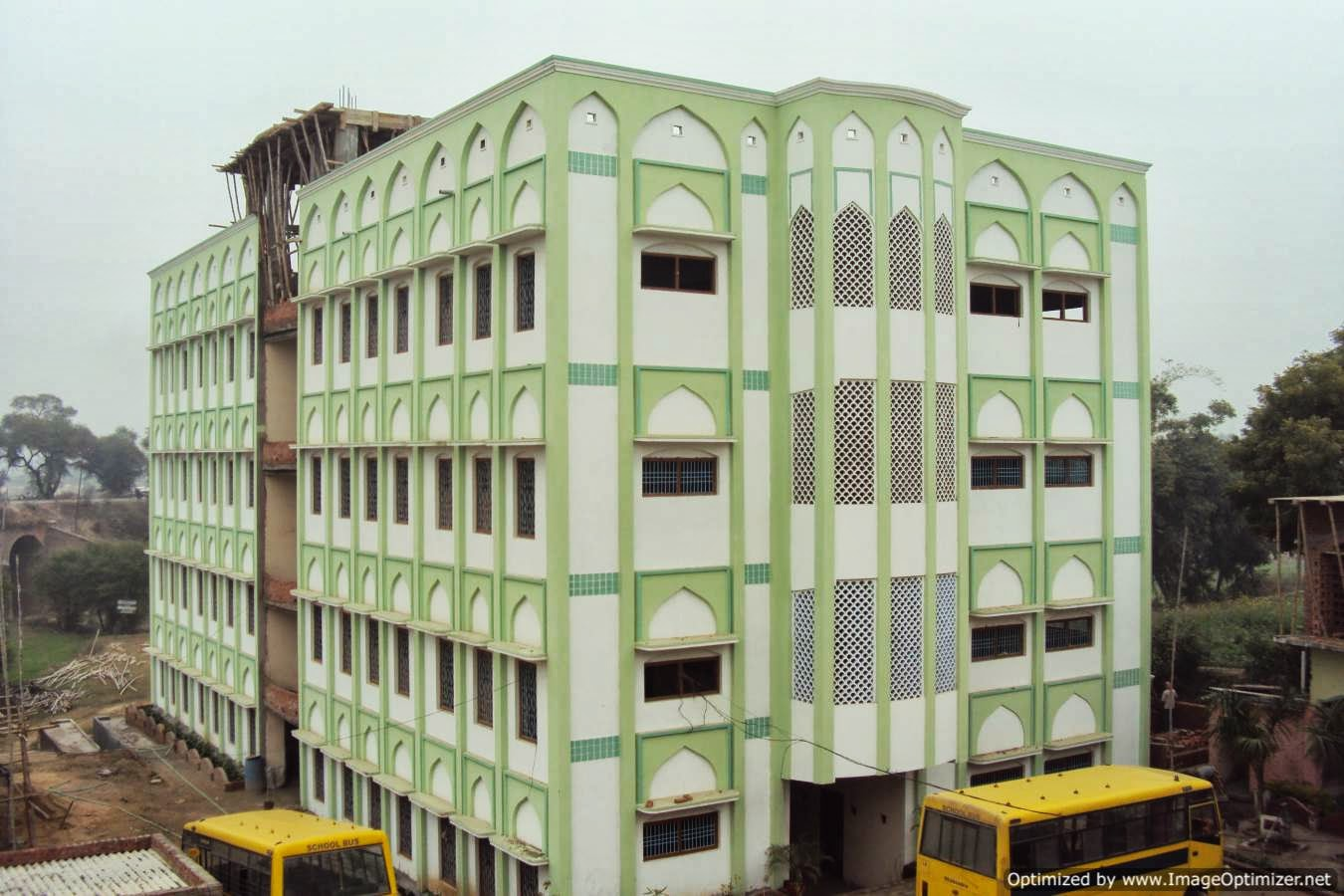
- Headquarters
- Abbreviation: IWS
- Established: 1995
- Founder: Maulana Anwar Ahmad Qasmi
- Type: NGO
- Headquarters: Jaunpur, Uttar Pradesh
- Region served: India
- Patron: Naiyar Iqbal
- Affiliations: Islamic Development Bank (IDB); Al Falah Al Khairiyah)
- Website: www.islamicwelfaresociety.in

Islamic Welfare Society (Urdu: اسلامک ویلفیئر سوسائٹی, Hindi: इस्लामिक वेलफेयर सोसाइटी) is a nonprofit organization located in Jaunpur. It was established in 1996.
