= Murara, Jaunpur =

Murara is a village in Jaunpur, Uttar Pradesh, India.
