= Kathaitkhas =

Katahit Khas is a village in Jaunpur, Uttar Pradesh, India.
