= Indu Prakash Singh =

Indu Prkash Singh
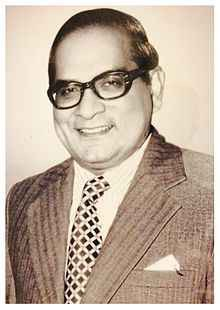
- Born: 23 July 1931; Jaunpur, United Provinces, British India
- Died: 16 August 2002 (aged 71); London, England
- Occupations: Indian Ambassador, Author, Civil Servant, Politician
- Spouse: Asha Singh

Indu Prakash Singh (I. P. Singh; 23 July 1931 – 16 August 2002) was an Indian philosopher, economist, politician, scholar, author and former diplomat with the Indian Foreign Service. He served as General Secretary of the Indian National Congress (Socialist) and was also a member of the National Executive of the Bharatiya Janata Party. He was appointed as Indian Ambassador to Nepal in 2001. He died in office on 16 August 2002 after a long battle with cancer.

== Early life ==
Indu Prakash Singh was born in the city of Jaunpur, in the Indian state of Uttar Pradesh to Dayawati Singh and Bhagwati Din Singh who was a Barrister at the time of the British Raj. His grandfather Suraj Bali Singh was a freedom fighter in the Indian independence movement.

He finished his schooling from Madho Patti, Jaunpur, from where he did his undergraduate degree at Tilakdhari College, Jaunpur. He went on to do a M.A degree in Philosophy from Allahabad University from where he also received his PHd in 1958.

== Career ==
He joined the Indian Foreign Service in the batch of 1955, having stood first in the All-India IFS entrance examination. After administrative training in the state of West Bengal which included a spell at Santiniketan, he joined the Oxford University for a special course in International relations. After serving in Indian Diplomatic Mission in Cairo, Beirut, Washington, D.C. and Kathmandu, he was appointed India's Ambassador to Sudan. Subsequently, he served as Deputy High Commissioner and Acting High Commissioner of India in London and as ambassador in Madrid and Rangoon, Myanmar. He also served in the Ministry of External Affairs and the Ministry of Commerce and Industry of the Government of India in various capacities.

As a diplomat, Dr. Singh had the opportunity to take part in a large number of international and bilateral meetings. Among these were the first Islamic Summit held in Rabat in 1969, the Indo-Pak meeting in Islamabad to resume diplomatic relations in 1976, the Non-aligned Coordination Bureau Foreign Ministers' Meeting in New Delhi in 1977 (of which he was Secretary-General), and the meeting of the Commonwealth Committee on Southern Africa to discuss the independence of Zimbabwe. He retired from the Indian Foreign Service in September 1989, after declining an offer of extension of service by the Government of India.

== Political career ==
Following his retirement in 1989, Dr. Singh entered political life, joining the Indian National Congress (Socialist), which was then part of V.P Singh's National Front. He stood in the 1989 Lok Sabha elections from the Jaunpur constituency, U.P, on the Congress (S) ticket but was defeated by the BJP's Raja Yadavendra Dutt Dubey. He went on to become General Secretary of the Congress (S) in 1990.

Dr I. P. Singh
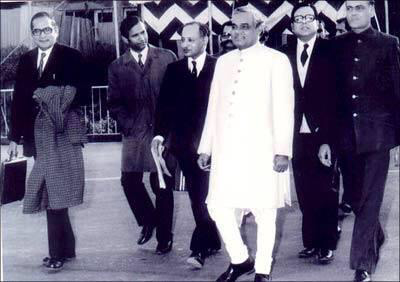
- Dr Singh (Extreme Left) accompanying the then Minister of External Affairs, Shri Atal Bihari Vajpayee and other dignitaries in the capacity of Joint Secretary Pakistan, Iran and Afghanistan.

In 1991, he launched his own Political party – the ‘Sajhawadi Party’ – modeled around the politico-economic ideology he had outlined in his last book – "Commonism – A Manifesto of a New Social Order". He had another failed attempt at standing for Lok Sabha from the Sajhawadi Party in the Delhi by-election in 1992, which was won by Indian National Congress candidate and veteran Bollywood actor Rajesh Khanna.

In 1995, Dr. Singh merged the Sajhawadi Party with the Bharatiya Janata Party and became head of the BJP’s foreign cell. He became a National Council Member of the BJP when the party briefly held power in 1998–99. During this period he became Chairman of the Indo-German Consultative Group carrying a Cabinet Rank. He also served from 1999 to 2002 as Vice-Chairman of the Research and Information Systems (RIS) for Developing Countries – an autonomous think tank under the Ministry of External Affairs that specializes in policy research on international economic issues and development cooperation.

== Family ==
Dr. Singh is survived by his wife and five children. His eldest daughter, Sujata Singh is an established Artist and teaches Art at The British School, New Delhi. His eldest son Rahul Kumar Singh is on the Board of Directors of Indian Company Severus and was formerly married to Princess Gayatri Singh Bhati of Jaisalmer State. His youngest daughter, Dr Naveena Singh is an accomplished Pathologist at St Bartholomew's Hospital, London and is married to eminent artist Stuart Robertson. His second son Amitabh Singh is an Officer in the Indian Postal Service of the Government of India, Amitabh Singh's wife Kalpana Singh is also a Joint Secretary to the Government of India. His youngest son, Janmejay Singh works for The World Bank in Washington D.C along with his wife, Ruchira Kumar who works at the International Finance Corporation.

Indian Entrepreneur Vijayraj Singh is his Grandson.

Dr. I. P. Singh's Family Members
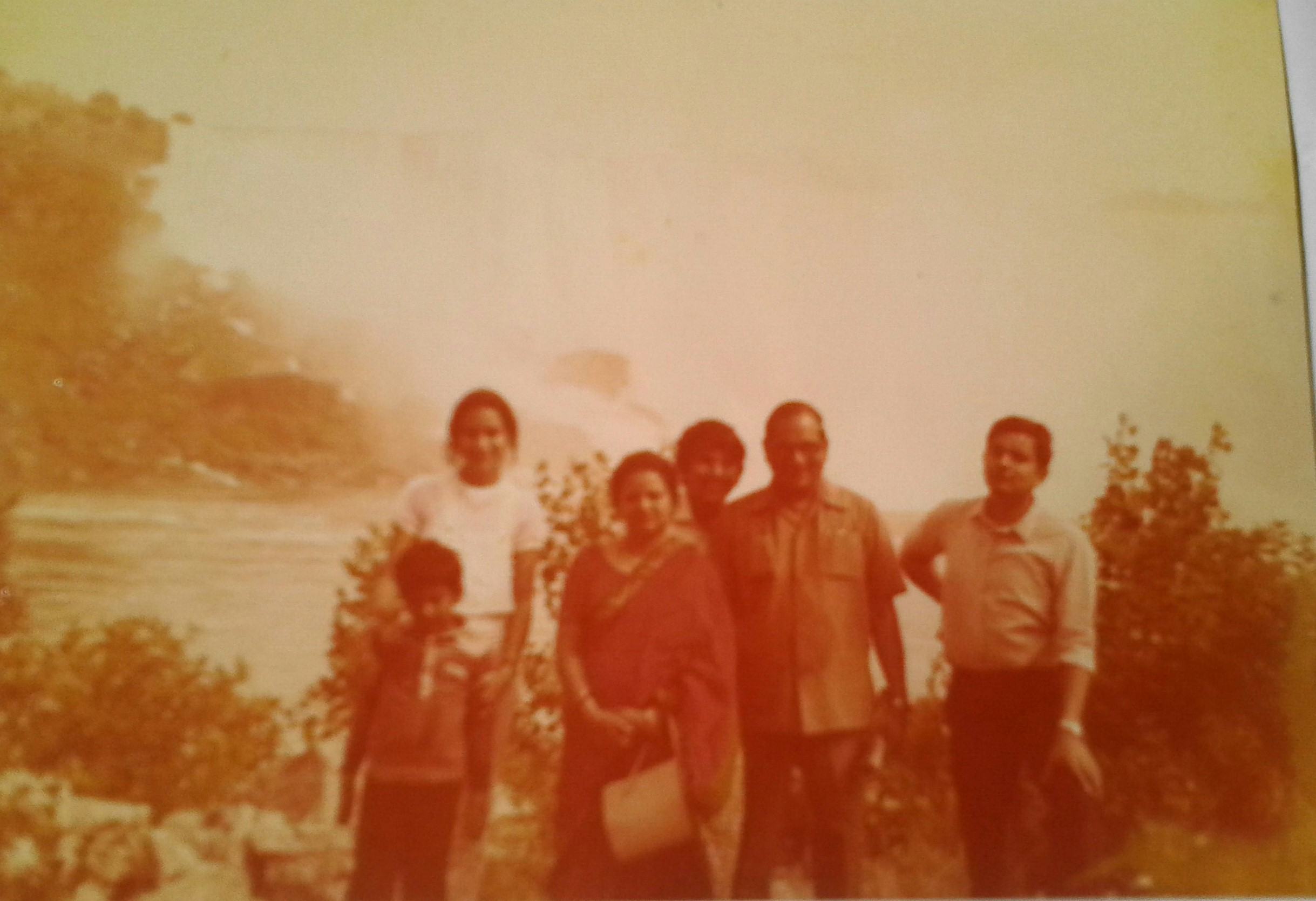
- This photo shows the whole family members of Dr. I P Singh. MERGEDr. Singh (Second from right) with his Family members, Mrs. Asha Singh his wife (Third from left), Mr. Rahul Kumar Singh (Eldest Son, Extreme right), Amitabh Singh (Forth from left behind his parents), Dr Naveena Singh (Extreme left) and Janmejay Singh the youngest son of Dr Singh.(Standing with his eldest sister Naveena Singh)

== Books ==
Dr. Singh was a regular contributor to newspaper and media articles and radio/television stores. He has authored various books:

- Diplommetry (1970)
- The Gita – A Workshop on the Expansion of Self (1977)
- The Aborted Revolution (1990)
- Commonism – The Manifesto of a New Social Order (1991)
- Women, Law and Social Change in India
- Indian Women: The Power Trapped
- Art of Partnership: Networking for the Rights of Homeless
- Indian Women, The Captured Beings
