= Sheetala Chaukiya Dham =

Hindu Temple in Uttar Pradesh, India

Sheetla Chaukiya Dham Temple
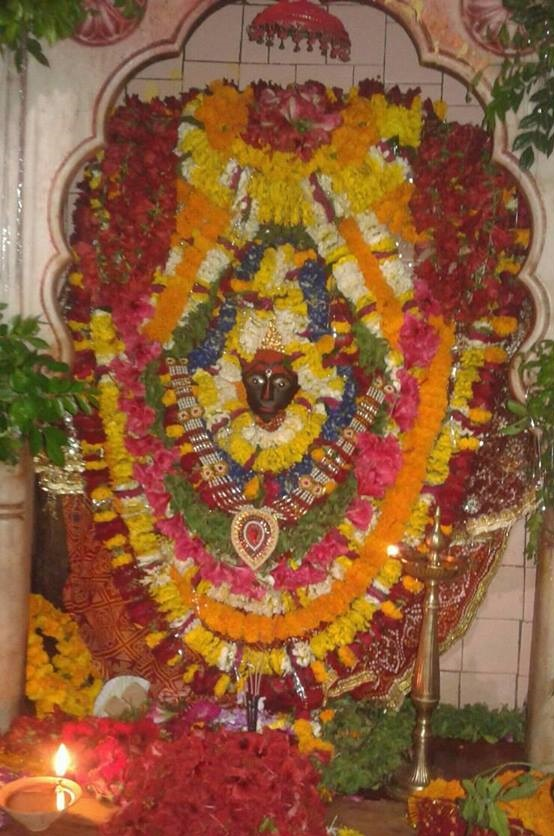
- Sheetla Chaukiya Dham Temple

- Sheetla Chaukiya Dham

Religion
- Affiliation: Hinduism
- District: Jaunpur
- Deity: Sheetla Devi (Shitala)
- Festival: Maha Navaratri

Location
- Location: Jaunpur
- State: Uttar Pradesh
- Country: India
- Coordinates: 25.765299°N 82.718486°E

Architecture
- Type: Mandir
- Creator: Heerchand Yadav (Ahir Ruler)

Website
- https://sheetalamatachaukiya.com/

Sheetla Chaukiya Dham Temple is a Hindu temple dedicated to Goddess Sheetla. It is located in Chaukiya Dham, in Jaunpur, Uttar Pradesh, India. The temple is a Hindu pilgrimage site. The presiding deity is known by the names Shitala and Sheetala (शीतला śītalā), meaning Goddess Of Coolness. This is an ancient temple of Maa Sheetla Chaukiya Devi.

== History ==
The History of Sheetla Chaukiya Dham is a blend of Royal patronage, ancient tribal traditions, and deep-seated religious folklore. Historical records indicate that during the era of Hindu monarchs, Jaunpur was governed by Heerchand who traditionally recognized as the first ruler of this region. His clan (Group) is believed to have constructed the temple in honor of their clan-deity. Many historians argue that the temple was actually built by the Bhars, a non-Aryan group that held significant power in ancient Jaunpur. The Bhars were devoted worshippers of Shiva and Shakti and were known for constructing sacred ponds; the existence of the large pond next to the temple supports this theory. The Temple's name reflects its humble beginnings Evolution of the Name Chaukiya Devi. At first, the Devi must have been installed on a raised platform or mound, locally called a Chauki and probably because of this she was referred to as Chaukiya Devi. Maa Sheetala represents the divine blessing of bestowing cool relief from the human suffering i.e Diseases. Devi is considered as the representative of blissful aspect of the Divine Mother. The temple is open daily and is most crowded on Monday and Friday, and during the Navratri festivals.

== Mythological Origins / Legends ==
The spiritual History of the Goddess is tied to the Puranas and local folklore One story says Goddess Durga has incarnated as little Katyayani, the daughter of sage Katyayan to destroy all arrogant evil demonic forces of the world, in her real form as Durga, she killed many demons that were sent by Kaalkeya.

A demon named Jvarasura, the demon of fever, started spreading incurable diseases to Katyayani's childhood friends, such as cholera, dysentery, measles, smallpox etc. Katyayani cured the diseases of some of her friends. To relieve the world from all fevers and diseases, Katyayani assumed the form of Shitala Devi. Each of her four hands held a short broom, winnowing fan, jar of cooling water and a drinking cup. With her power, she cured all the children's diseases. Katyayani then requests her friend, Batuk to go out and confront the demon Jvarasura. A battle ensued between the young Batuk and demon Jvarasura. Jvarasura succeeds in defeating Batuk. Then, Batuk lying dead, magically faded into dust. Jvarasura was shocked that Batuk disappeared and wondered where he went. Then, what he doesn't know that Batuk has assumed the form of an awful male figure with three-eyed and had four arms. He held a battle-axe, sword, trident and demon head. He was pitch-black in color. His hair was flowing. Eyes blazed with fury. This figure wore a tiger-skin and a garland of skulls. Batuk assumed the form of Lord Shiva's ferocious form, the terrible Bhairav. Bhairav reprimands Jvarasura and told him that he is the servant of Goddess Durga (incarnate as Katyayani). A long discussion ensued but then converted into battle. Jvarasura created many demons from his powers but Bhairav managed to destroy all of them. Finally, Bhairav wrestled with Jvarasura and killed him with his trident.

== Festivals ==
The primary festivals at Sheetla Chaukiya Dham revolve around the worship of Goddess Sheetla, with the temple serving as a major spiritual hub in the Purvanchal region. The most significant celebrations include the annual Shringar Mahotsav, Sheetala Ashtami, and the bi-annual Navratri fairs.

- Shringar Mahotsav: A grand three-day annual festival featuring elaborate floral decorations (shringar) of the deity using flowers from Varanasi and Kolkata. The event includes evening Bhajan Sandhyas and cultural programs.
- Sheetala Ashtami / Basoda: Also known as Basoda, this is the most important day for the deity. Devotees offer pre-cooked "cold" food (Basoda) to the goddess, seeking protection from diseases.
- Chaitra Navratri: A nine-day spring festival where the temple experiences a massive surge in devotees. It culminates with Ram Navami.
- Sharad Navratri: The most widely celebrated Navratri, marked by grand rituals and fairs. Maha Ashtami will be observed in October and the festival concludes with Vijayadashami.

== Modernization Projects ==
The Uttar Pradesh Tourism Department has recently initiated a major modernization and beautification project for Sheetla Chaukiya Dham in Jaunpur, with an investment of approximately ₹6 crore. This project aims to transform the shrine into a grand religious corridor, drawing inspiration from the Vindhyavasini Corridor in Mirzapur.

Key Modernization Features:

- Grand Entry Gates: Two new entrance gates are being constructed—one on the Shahganj route and another on the Pachatiya-Sheetla Chaukiya route—to manage crowd flow.
- Main Entrance Revamp: The main gate will be redesigned to include a statue of Goddess Sheetla and an idol of Lord Ganesha, creating a more spiritual welcoming atmosphere.
- Renovated Verandas: Old tin sheds over the temple courtyard (veranda) are being replaced with modern, architecturally aesthetic structures to give the temple a "magnificent and grand" look.
- Sagar (Sacred Pond) Beautification: The historic pond behind the temple will feature new fountains, updated stone designs on walls, and spiritual paintings.
- New Amenities:
- Dedicated Sitting Areas for pilgrims.
- A Cultural Stage for hosting religious events and festivals.
- CC Roads and Interlocking Tiles in the surrounding lanes for easier access.
- New Sulah Shauchalaya (public restrooms) and improved drainage systems.

== Transport ==
The temple is easily accessible from local and regional transport hubs.

By Air: The nearest airport is Lal Bahadur Shastri International Airport in Varanasi, approximately 50 km away.

By Train: Jaunpur Junction (JNU): Located about 3 km from the temple. Jaunpur City Station (JOP): Located about 8 km from the temple. Yadvendranagar (YDV): Located about 1.5 Km from the temple.

By Road: The Jaunpur Bus Stand is about 5 km away. If driving your own vehicle, the temple offers free parking facilities. Small vehicles can go directly to the main gate, which is helpful for senior citizens.
