= Shahi Qila, Jaunpur =

Fort in Uttar Pradesh, India

Shahi Qila
- Jaunpur, Uttar Pradesh in India
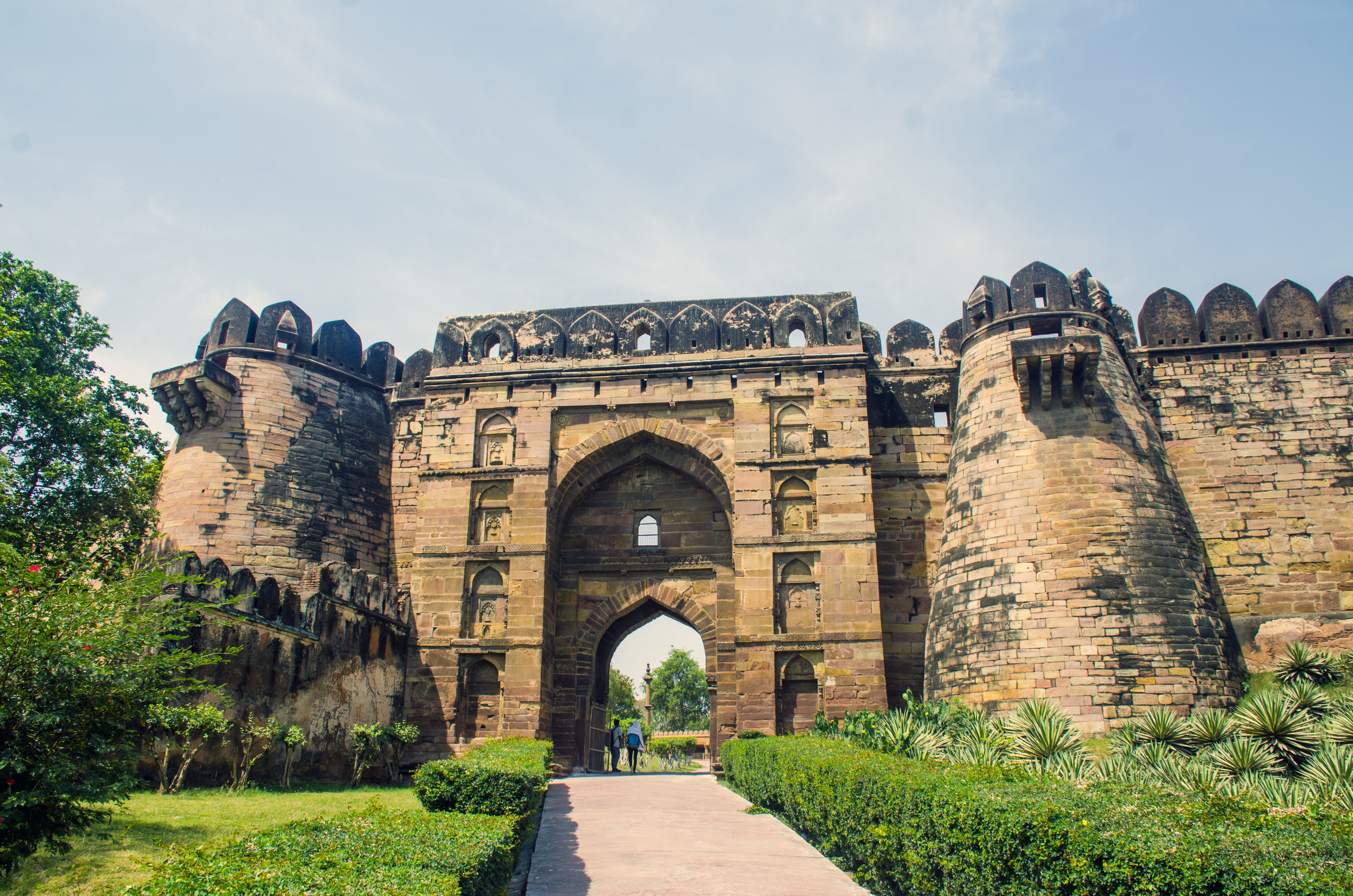
- Inner gate of the Shahi Qila, Jaunpur

Site information
- Type: River side fort
- Owner: Government of India
- Controlled by: Tughlak's Lodi dynasty Mughal emperors: Humayun and; Akbar; India (1947-Present )
- Open to the public: Yes
- Condition: Good
- Website: http://jaunpur.nic.in/

Location
- Shown within Uttar Pradesh
- Location within Uttar Pradesh Location within India
- Coordinates: 25.749619°N 82.688506°E

Site history
- Built: 1362, (Rebuilt - 1576-77)
- Built by: Ibrahim Naib Barbak
- Materials: Stone

Shahi Qila (English: Royal Fort), also known as Karar Fort or Jaunpur Fort, is a fort built during the 14th century in Jaunpur, Uttar Pradesh, India. The fort is located close to the Shahi Bridge on the Gomti River.

== Background ==
A tourist attraction of the Jaunpur city, it is located near Shahi Bridge on the Gomti River, 2.2 kilometres (1.4 mi) from Jaunpur.

Constructed by Ibrahim Naib Barbak, a chieftain of Firoz Shah Tughlaq, it was constructed using material from old Rathore structures. The fort was destroyed multiple times by rulers, including the Lodhis and the British Empire. It went through extensive renovations and repairs during the Mughal Empire.

== History ==
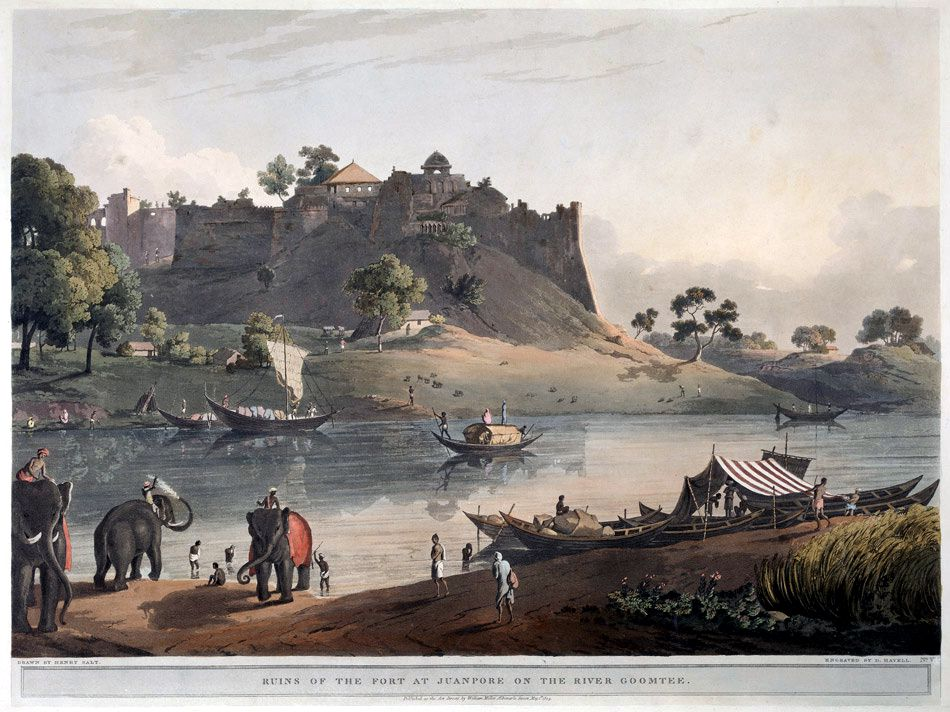
The Fort in 1805, by Daniel Havell, after Henry Salt

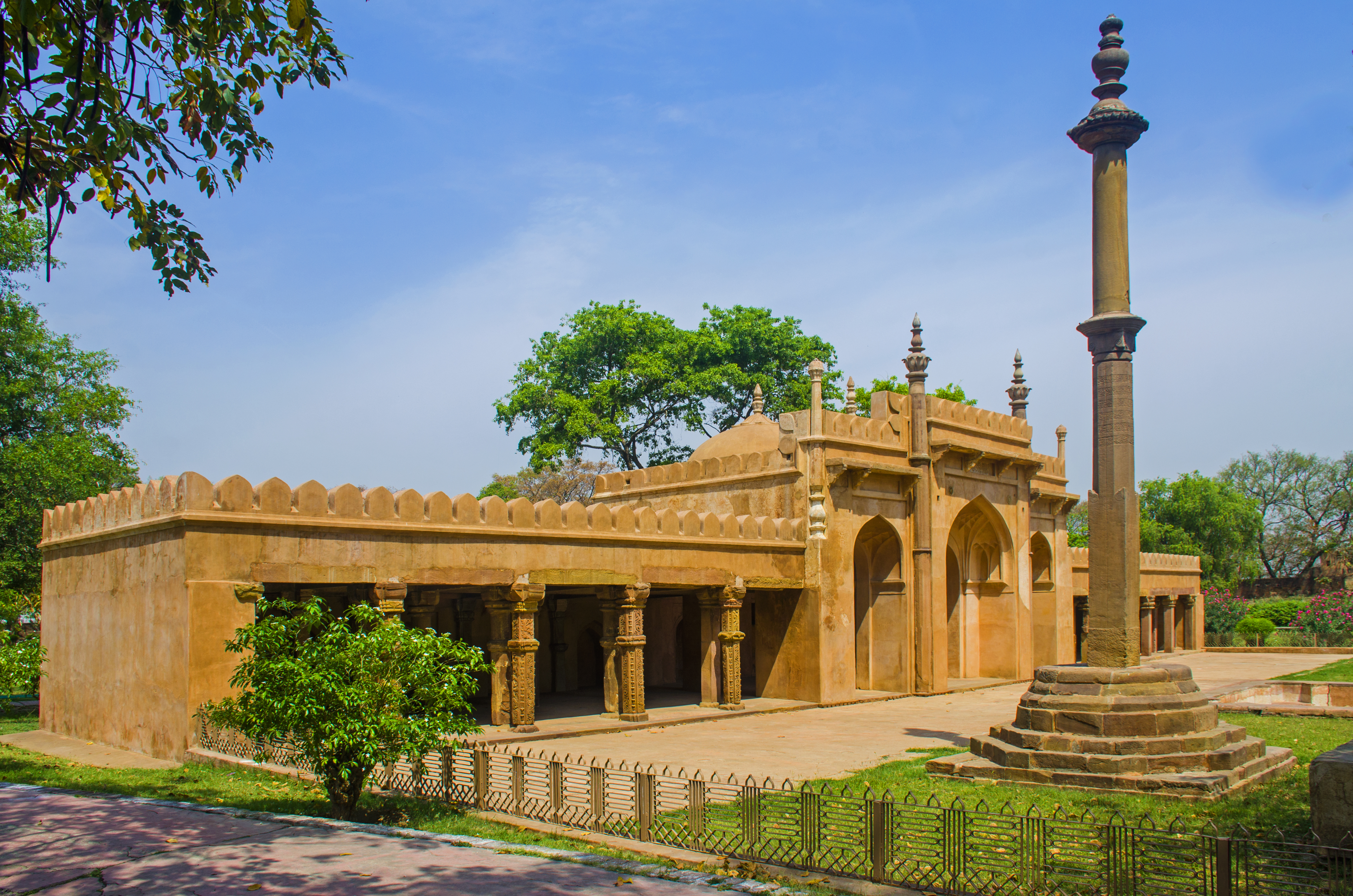
Mosque inside Jaunpur Fort

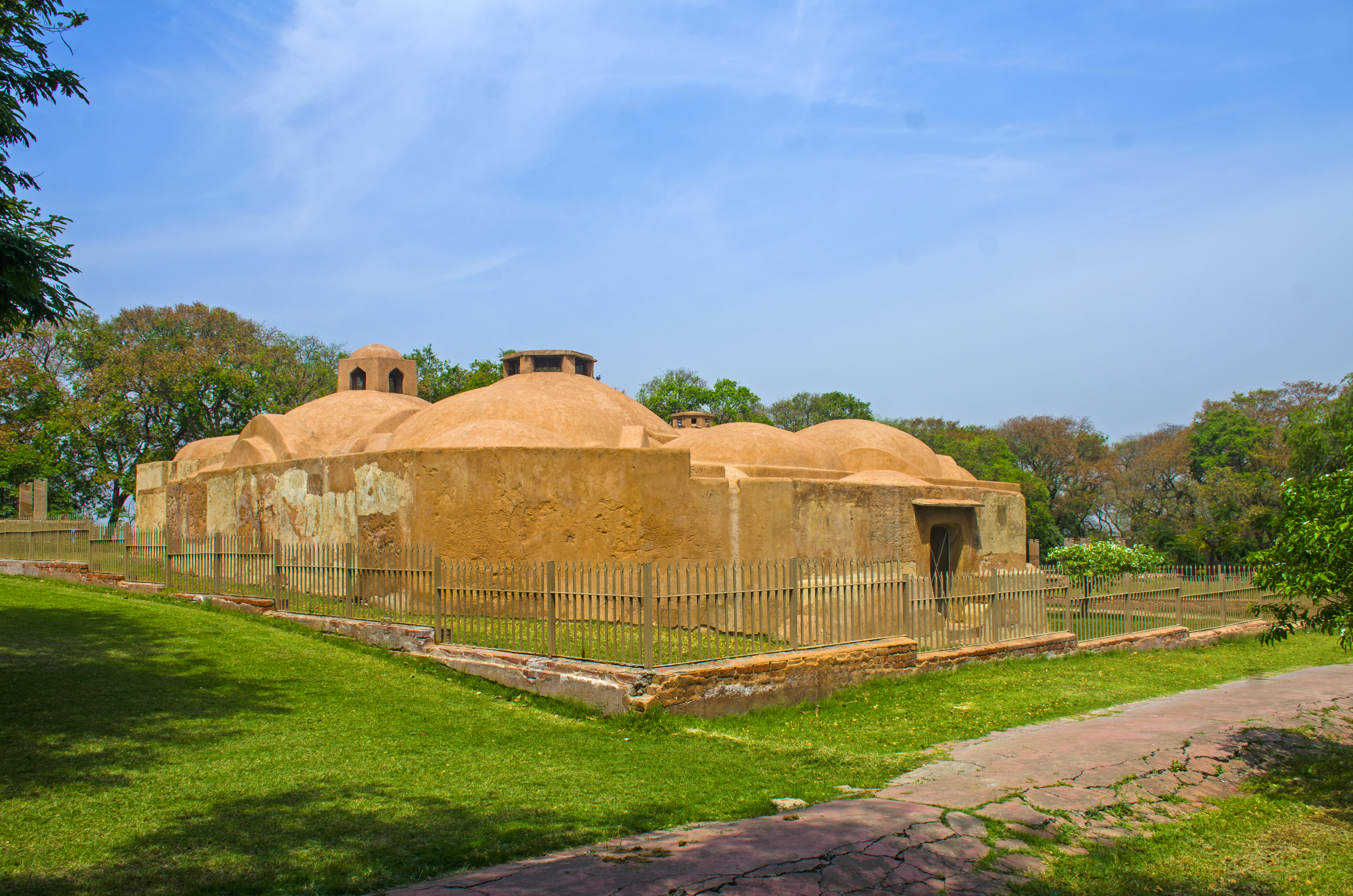
Hammam inside Jaunpur Fort

The Kerar Kot fort once stood on the same site on the left (north) bank of the Gomti River. It contained a mosque and a spacious and stylish set of baths (hammam) installed by Barbak, the brother of Tughlaq. The fort's layout is an irregular quadrangle enclosed in stone walls. The walls surround raised earthworks. Most of the remains of the original structures are buried or in ruin.

The main gates face east. The largest inner gate is 14 metres (46 ft) in height. Its external surface is set with ashlar stone. A further outer gate was installed during the reign of the Mughal emperor Akbar under the patronage of the governor of Jaunpur, Min'im Khan, in the 16th century. It is designed in the shape of a flanking bastion. The spandrels or spaces between the arches of the outer gate were decorated with blue and yellow tiles. Ornamental niches are built into the walls of the outer gate.

The two-storey residential and administrative building or "palace" was built in a square layout. An interior pillared verandah or aiwan overlooked the ground floor from the first.

Nothing much has survived inside the fort. A mosque and a Turkish hammam are the only two prominent structures within the fort complex. Apart from these the complex also contains a gate-like structure along with a dargah.

=== Bhool bhulaiya ===
The structure consists of several domes with openings on tops allowing light to filter in. The interior consists of several rooms complete with water channels and tubs. The rooms are connected with a complex maze of passageways giving it a bhulaiya -like appearance.

=== The Mosque ===
The mosque or masjid is likely the oldest building in Jaunpur township. It follows a rectangular plan of dimension 39.40 metres (129.3 ft) x 6.65 metres (21.8 ft). The mosque has a triple arch and is topped with three low central domes. There is a stone pillar next to the mosque.

== See also ==
- List of forts in Uttar Pradesh
