= Shahi Bridge =

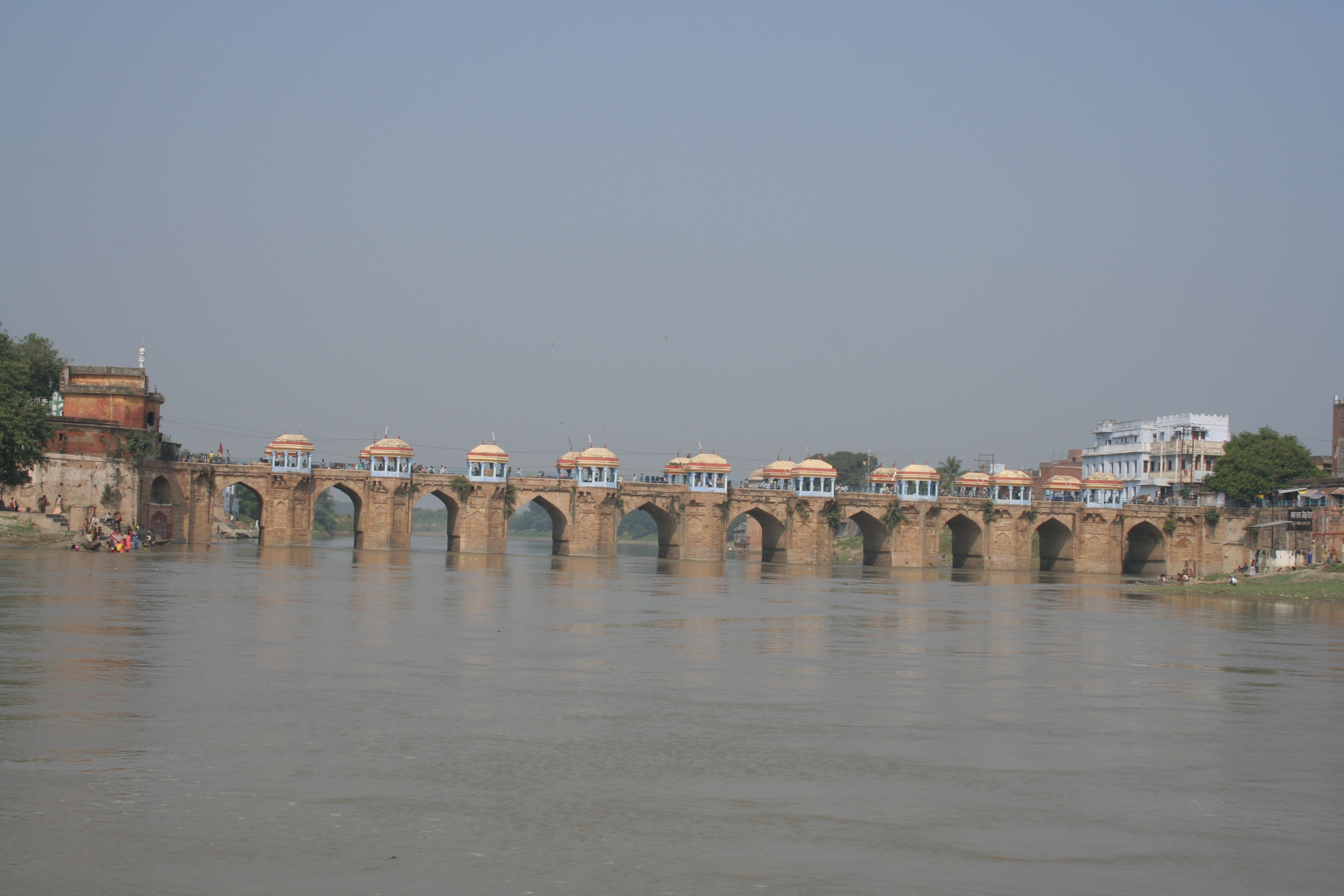
- Panoramic view of Shahi bridge
- Coordinates: 25.74870°N 82.68468°E
- Crossed: Gomti River
- Locale: Jaunpur
- Official name: Akbari Bridge
- Maintained by: Directorate of Archaeology, (U.P.); UP-PWD; UP Bridge corporation
- Heritage status: 1978
- Preceded by: Boat Bridge of Sharqi's
- Followed by: Sadbhavana Bridge

Characteristics
- Design: Arch bridge

History
- Designer: Afzal Ali
- Construction start: 1564
- Construction end: 1567
- Opened: 1567
- Collapsed: 1934 (partial i.e. ⅓)

Statistics
- Toll: free

Location
- Interactive map of Shahi Bridge

Shahi Bridge, also known as Munim Khan's Bridge, Akbari Bridge, Mughal Bridge or Jaunpur Bridge,is a 16th-century bridge over river Gomti in Jaunpur, Uttar Pradesh, India. The Shahi Bridge is located 1.7 kilometres (1.1 mi) north of Jaunpur Railway station, 7.3 kilometres (4.5 mi) northwest of Zafarābād, 16.2 kilometres (10.1 mi) north-northeast of Mariāhū and 26.6 kilometres (16.5 mi) west-northwest of the town of Kirākat.

== Construction ==
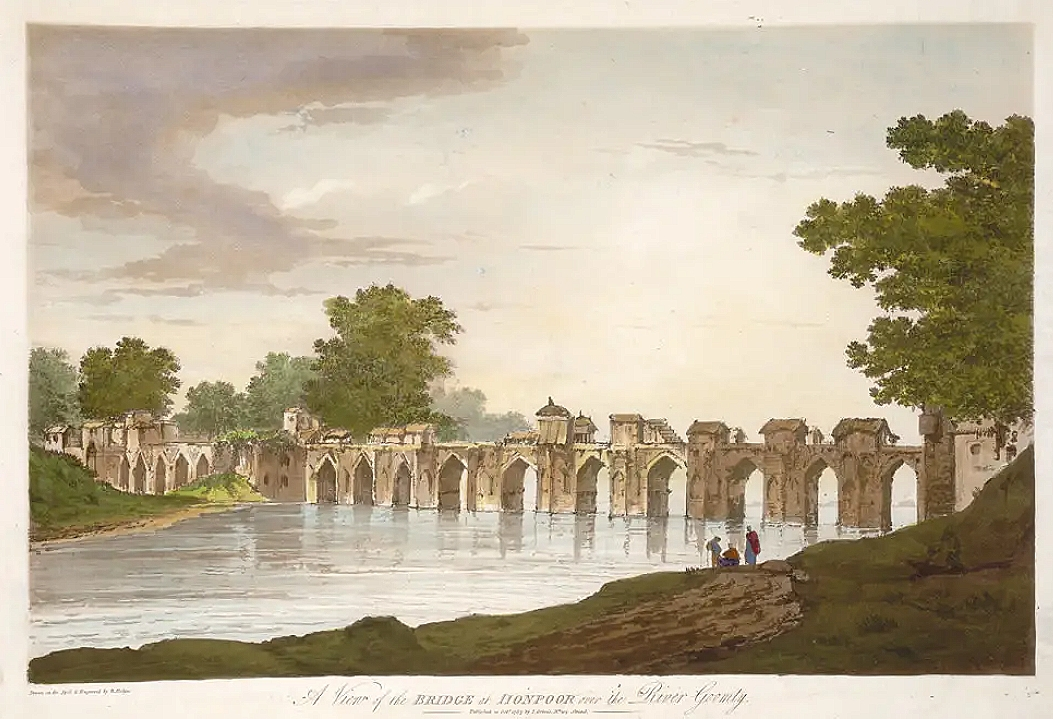
Jaunpur Bridge: a plate from 'William Hodges' book 'Select Views in India'

Mughal Emperor Akbar ordered the construction of the Shahi Bridge, which was completed in the year 1568–69 by Munim Khan. It took four years to complete the bridge. It was designed by Afghan architect Afzal Ali.

== Current use ==
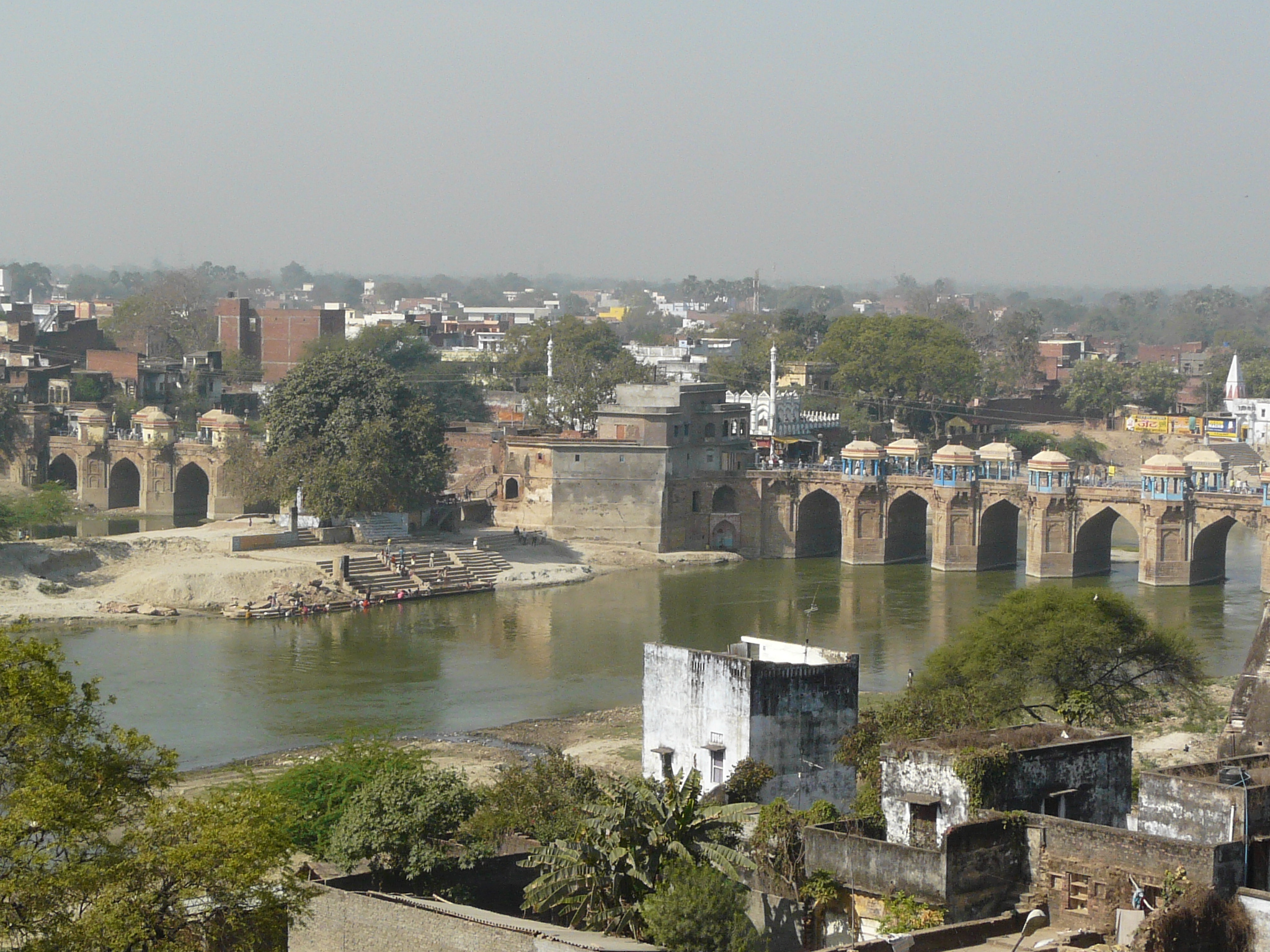
Distant view of Shahi bridge over Gomti river, Jaunpur.

The bridge was severely damaged in the 1934 Nepal–Bihar earthquake. Seven of its arches had to be rebuilt. In addition to its historical significance, the bridge is still in use. The bridge consists of 28 colourful chattris, which presently operates as makeshift shops.

The bridge is on the Protection & Conservation list of Directorate of Archaeology, (U.P.) since 1978. The bridge is generally recognised as Jaunpur's most significant Mughal structure.

A new bridge parallel to Shahi Bridge was opened on 28 November, 2006 by the then Chief Minister of Uttar Pradesh, Mulayam Singh Yadav.

== In literature ==
William Hodges in his book 'Select Views in India' mentions about bridge:

"The inundations have been frequently known to rise even over the bridge in so much that in the year 1774 a whole brigade of the British forces was passed over it in boats."

Rudyard Kipling's poem Akbar's Bridge mentions this bridge.

== See also ==
- Atala Masjid, Jaunpur
- Jama Masjid, Jaunpur

== Notes ==
- Alfieri, Bianca Maria. 2000. Islamic Architecture of the Indian Subcontinent. London: Laurence King Publishing, 103.
