= Jafarabad, Uttar Pradesh =

Jafarabad
- Town
- Location in Uttar Pradesh, India Jafarabad (India)
- Coordinates: 25°42′N 82°42′E
- Country: India
- State: Uttar Pradesh
- District: Jaunpur

Government
  - Type: Chairman
  - Body: Central government

Population (2011)
  - Total: 10,792

Language
  - Official: Hindi
  - Additional official: Urdu
- Time zone: UTC+5:30 (IST)
- Postal code: 222180
- Vehicle registration: UP 62
- Website: up.gov.in

Jafarabad (sometimes Zafarabad) is a town and nagar panchayat in Jaunpur district in the Indian state of Uttar Pradesh.

== Demographics ==
As of 2011 Indian Census, Jafarabad had a total population of 10,792, of which 5,578 were males and 5,214 were females. Population within the age group of 0 to 6 years was 1,595. The total number of literates in Jafarabad was 6,897, which constituted 63.9% of the population with male literacy at 71.1% and female literacy at 56.3%. The effective literacy rate of 7+ population of Jafarabad was 75.0%, of which male literacy rate was 84.0% and female literacy rate 65.5%. The Scheduled Castes and Scheduled Tribes population was 1,374 and 27, respectively. Jafarabad had 1,497 households in 2011.

As of the 2001 Census of India, Jafarabad had a population of 8,801. Males constitute 50% of the population and females 50%. Jafarabad has an average literacy rate of 58%, lower than the national average of 59.5%: male literacy is 68%, and female literacy is 48%. In Jafarabad, 20% of the population is under 6 years of age.

== Travel ==
Zafarabad (IR Station code ZBD) is an important railway junction station under Allahabad division of Northern Railway (India) zone of Indian Railways.

It connects Jaunpur Junction on north direction, Janghai junction, Phaphamau Junction, Allahabad of east direction, Varanasi Junction on south-east direction and Sultanpur junction on North-west direction.
