= Jaunpur, Uttar Pradesh =

City in Uttar Pradesh, India

Jaunpur
- City
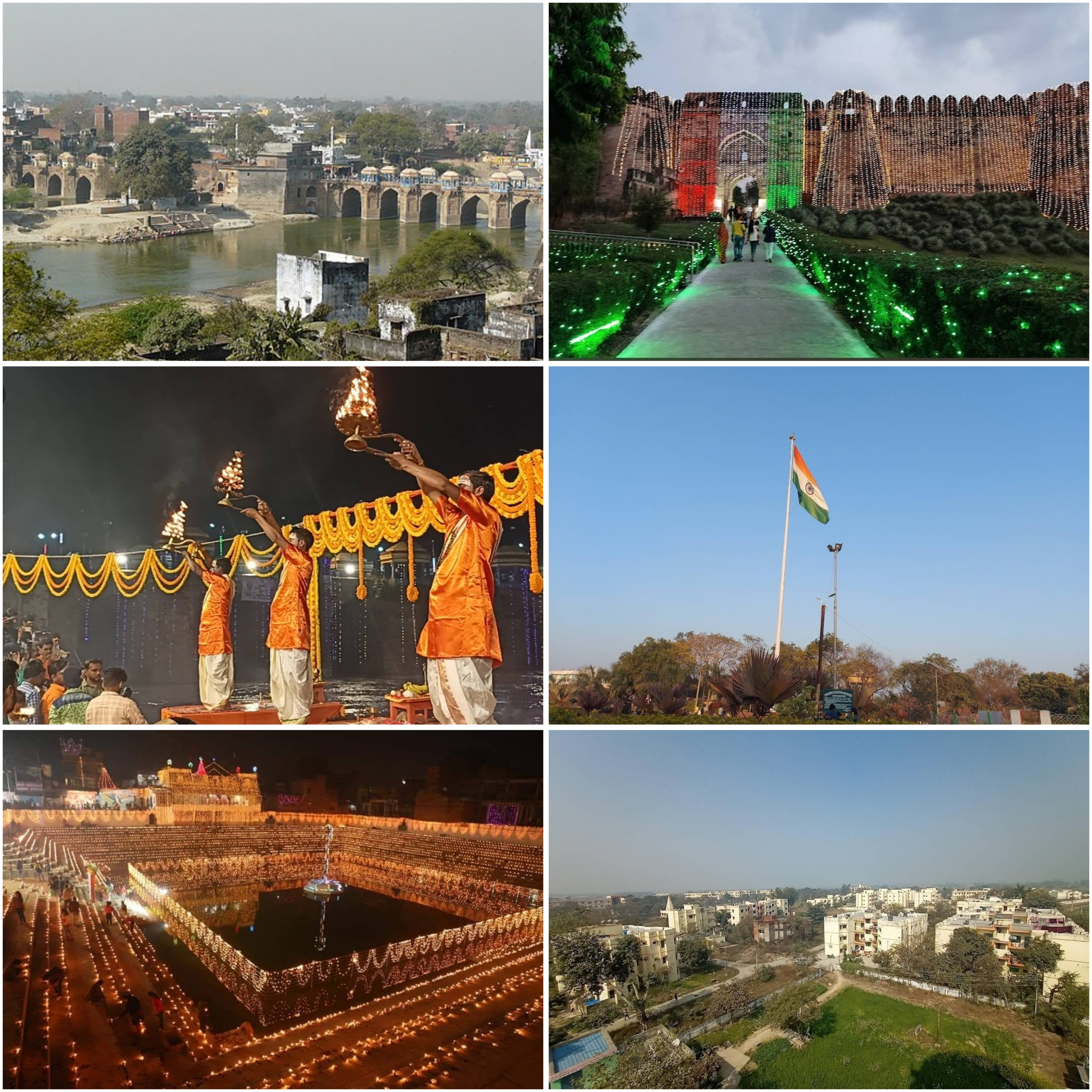
- Jaunpur From Top Left to Bottom Right: Shahi Bridge, Shahi Quila, Gomti Arti at Gopighat, Lohia Paryawaran Park, Sheetla Chaukiya Temple, Purvanchal University Campus

- Location within Uttar Pradesh Location within India
- Coordinates: 25.73°N 82.68°E
- Country: India
- State: Uttar Pradesh
- District: Jaunpur
- Founded: 1359
- Named for: Muhammad bin Tughlaq; (known as "Juna Khan" as Prince)

Government
  - Member of Parliament: Babu Singh Kushwaha
- Elevation: 82 m (269 ft)

Population (2011)
  - Total: 180,362
  - Density: 1,113/km^{2} (2,880/sq mi)

Language
  - Official: Hindi
  - Additional official: Urdu
  - Regional: Awadhi, Bhojpuri
- Time zone: UTC+5:30 (IST)
- Postal code: 222001
- Vehicle registration: UP-62
- Sex ratio: 925 females per 1000 males ♂/♀
- Website: jaunpur.nic.in

Jaunpur (Hindustani pronunciation: [dʒɔːnpʊr]) is a city and a municipal board in Jaunpur district in the Indian state of Uttar Pradesh. It is located 228 km southeast of state capital Lucknow. Demographically, Jaunpur resembles the rest of the Purvanchal area in which it is located.

== History ==
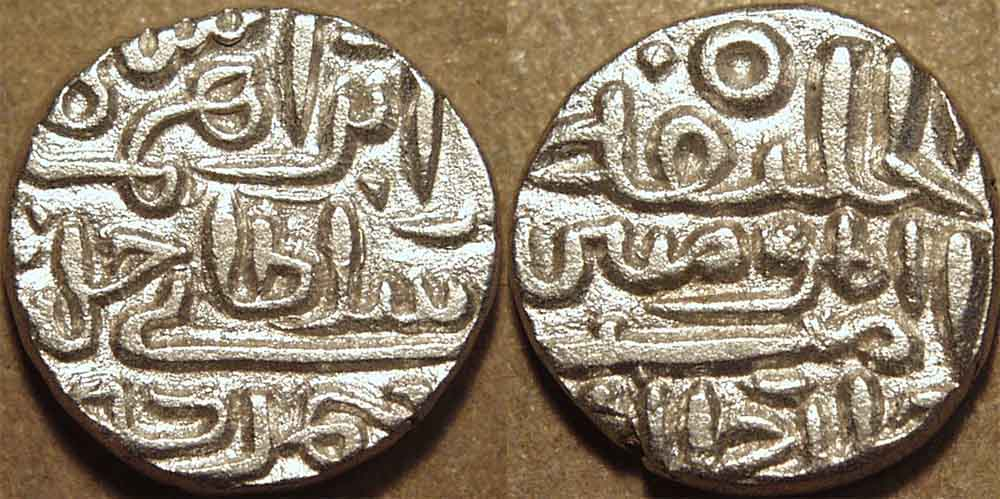
Billon coin of 32 rattis, issued by Ibrahim Shah of Jaunpur.

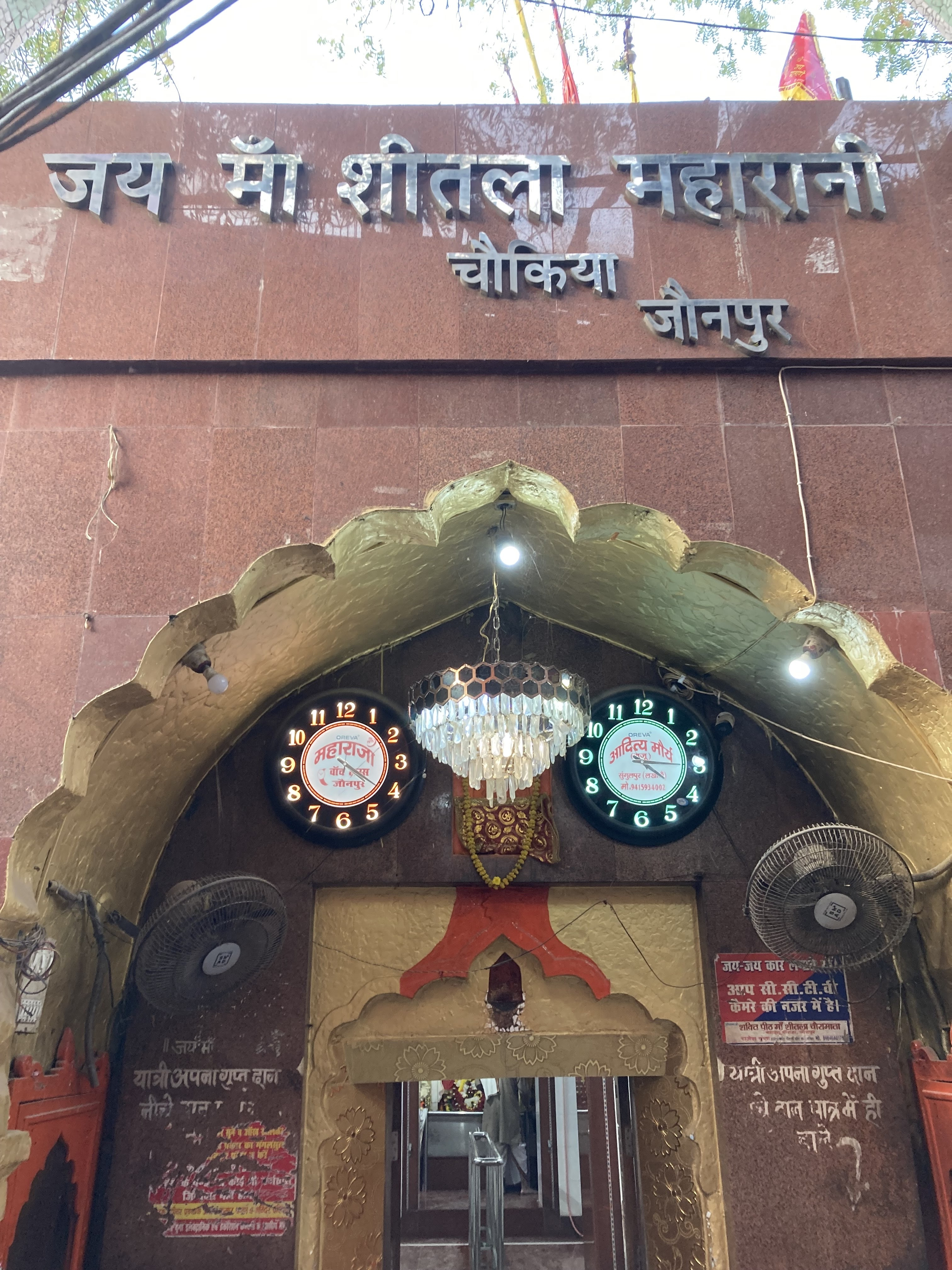
The famous Sheetla Mata Chaukiya Temple was built by either Yadavs or Bhars

Earliest Hindu rulers of Jaunpur were the Ahirs/Yadavs, Heerchand Yadav being the first ruler of Jaunpur. Ahirs/Yadavs built forts at Chandwak and Gopalpur villages of Jaunpur

It is believed that the famous temple of Chaukiya Devi was built in the glory of their clan-deity either by the Yadavs or the Bhars- but in view of the predilections of the Bhars, it seems more logical to conclude that this temple was built by the Bhars. The Bhars were non-Aryans. The worship of Shiv and Shakti was prevalent in the non-aryans. The Bhars also held some power in Jaunpur.

In 1359, the city was invaded by the Sultan of Delhi Feroz Shah Tughlaq and named in memory of his cousin, Muhammad bin Tughluq, whose given name was Jauna Khan. In 1388, Feroz Shah Tughlaq appointed Malik Sarwar (an eunuch, who was notorious for having been the lover of Feroz Shah Tughlaq's daughter) as the governor of the region. The Sultanate was in disarray because of factional fighting for power, and in 1393 Malik Sarwar declared independence. He and his adopted son Mubarak Shah founded what came to be known as the Sharqi dynasty (dynasty of the East). During the Sharqi period (1394 and 1479) the Jaunpur Sultanate was a strong military power in Northern India, and on several occasions threatened the Delhi Sultanate.

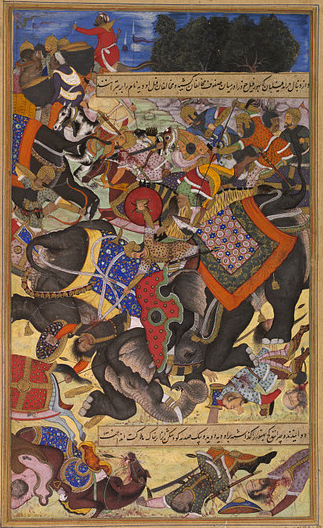
It depicts the elephant Citranand attacking another, called Udiya, during the Mughal campaign against the rebel forces of Khan Zaman and Bahadur Khan in 1567.

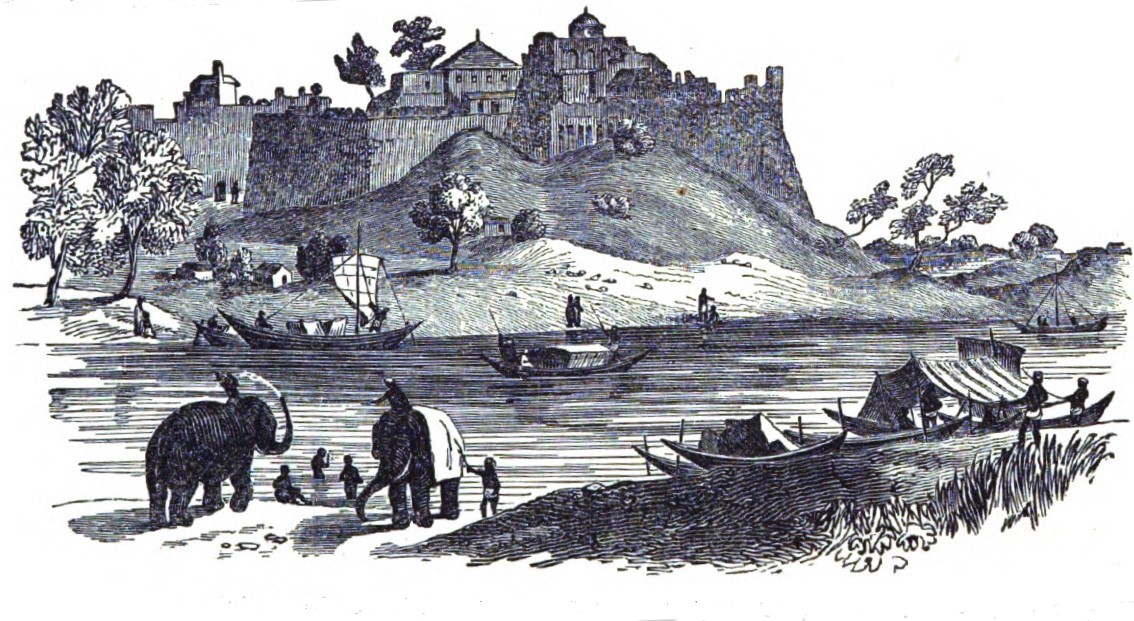
View at Juanpore, on the River Gomti (1847)

The Jaunpur Sultanate attained its greatest height under the younger brother of Mubarak Shah, who ruled as Shams-ud-din Ibrahim Shah (ruled 1402–1440). To the east, his kingdom extended to Bihar, and to the west, to Kanauj; he even marched on Delhi at one point. Under the aegis of a Muslim holy man named Qutb al-Alam, he threatened the Sultanate of Bengal under Shihabuddin Bayazid Shah.

During the reign of Husain Shah (1456–76), the Jaunpur army was perhaps the biggest in India, and Husain decided to attempt a conquest of Delhi. However, he was defeated on three successive attempts by Bahlul Khan Lodi. It is a dominant trend in modern historiography of the period that this defeat was a cause of a large number of eunuchs in the military ranks. Finally, under Sikandar Lodi, the Delhi Sultanate was able to reconquer Jaunpur in 1493, bringing that sultanate to an end.

The Jaunpur Sultanate was a major center of Urdu and Sufi knowledge and culture. The Sharqi dynasty was known for its excellent communal relations between Muslims and Hindus, perhaps stemming from the fact that the Sharqis themselves were originally indigenous converts to Islam, as opposed to descendants of Persians or Afghans. Jaunpur's independence came to an end in 1480, when the city was conquered by Sikander Lodi, the Sultan of Delhi. The Sharqi kings attempted for several years to retake the city, but ultimately failed.

Although many of the Sharqi monuments were destroyed when the Lodis took the city, several important mosques remain, most notably the Atala Masjid, Jama Masjid (now known as the Badi (big mosque) Masjid) and the Lal Darwaza Masjid. The Jaunpur mosques display a unique architectural style, combining traditional Hindu and Muslim motifs with purely original elements. The old bridge over the Gomti River in Jaunpur dates from 1564, the era of the Mughal Emperor Akbar. The bridge is still being used for transportation. The Jaunpur Qila, a fortress from the Tughlaq era, also remains in good form.

Jaunpur district was annexed into British India based on the Permanent settlement of 1779, and thus was subject to the Zamindari system of land revenue collection.

During the Revolt of 1857 the Sikh troops in Jaunpur joined the Indian rebels. The district was eventually reconquered for the British by Gurkha troops from Nepal. Jaunpur then became a district administrative center. The major rebellion took place in Jaunpur when freedom fighters, led by Pandit Badrinath Tiwari, unfurled national flag at the railway station of Nibhapur. It was marked by a series of government-led suppressions of Pandit Badrinath Tiwari and his fellow freedom fighters throughout the district brave Pandit Ji refused to bow down in front of British atrocities.

=== Present state ===
Jaunpur is the district headquarters. The district has 2 Lok Sabha and 9 Vidhan Sabha constituencies.

== Geography ==
Jaunpur is located in the eastern part of Uttar Pradesh on the Indo-Gangetic plain. It is located along the Gomti river.

=== Rivers ===
Gomti, Sai, Varuna, Pili Nadi ('yellow rivulet' or 'river'), Mayur and Basuhi are the five local rivers. Gujar tal in Jaunpur is the largest lake in Varanasi division. Efforts are being made to develop it as an eco-tourism site.

== Demographics ==
Religions in Jaunpur (2011)
Religion	Percent
Hinduism	63.48%
Islam	33.28%
Other or not stated	3.24%
Distribution of religions

As per 2011 Indian Census, Jaunpur NPP had population of 180,362 of which male and female were 93,718 and 86,644 respectively, that is a sex ratio of 1024 females per 1000 males. Child population in the age range of 0–6 years was 22,710. The total number of literates in Jaunpur was 128,050, which constituted 71% of the population with male literacy of 75.2% and female literacy of 66.5%. The effective literacy rate of 7+ population of Jaunpur was 81.2%, of which male literacy rate was 86.1% and female literacy rate was 75.9%. The Scheduled Castes and Scheduled Tribes population was 12,703 (7.04%) and 195 (0.11%) respectively. There were 26216 households as of 2011.

The largest religion is Hinduism which is followed by 63% of the population. Muslims are a significant minority in the city, followed by 1/3 of the population.

90.86% of the population speaks Hindi as their first language. 8.81% of the population speaks Urdu as their first language.

== Landmarks ==
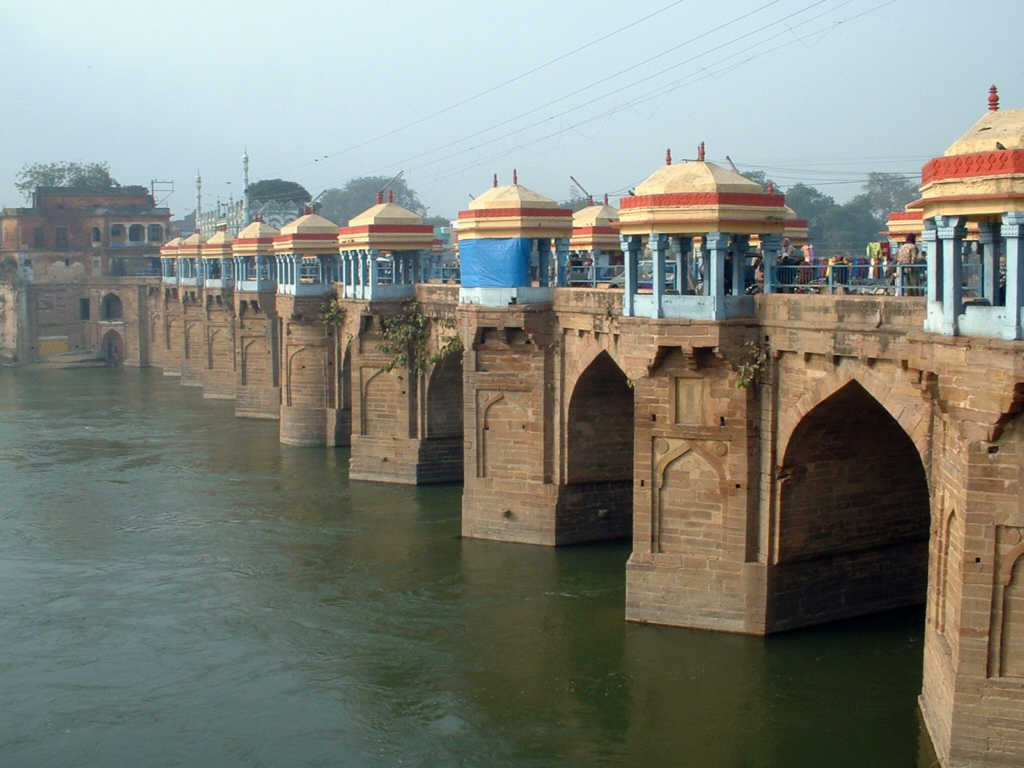
Shahi Bridge

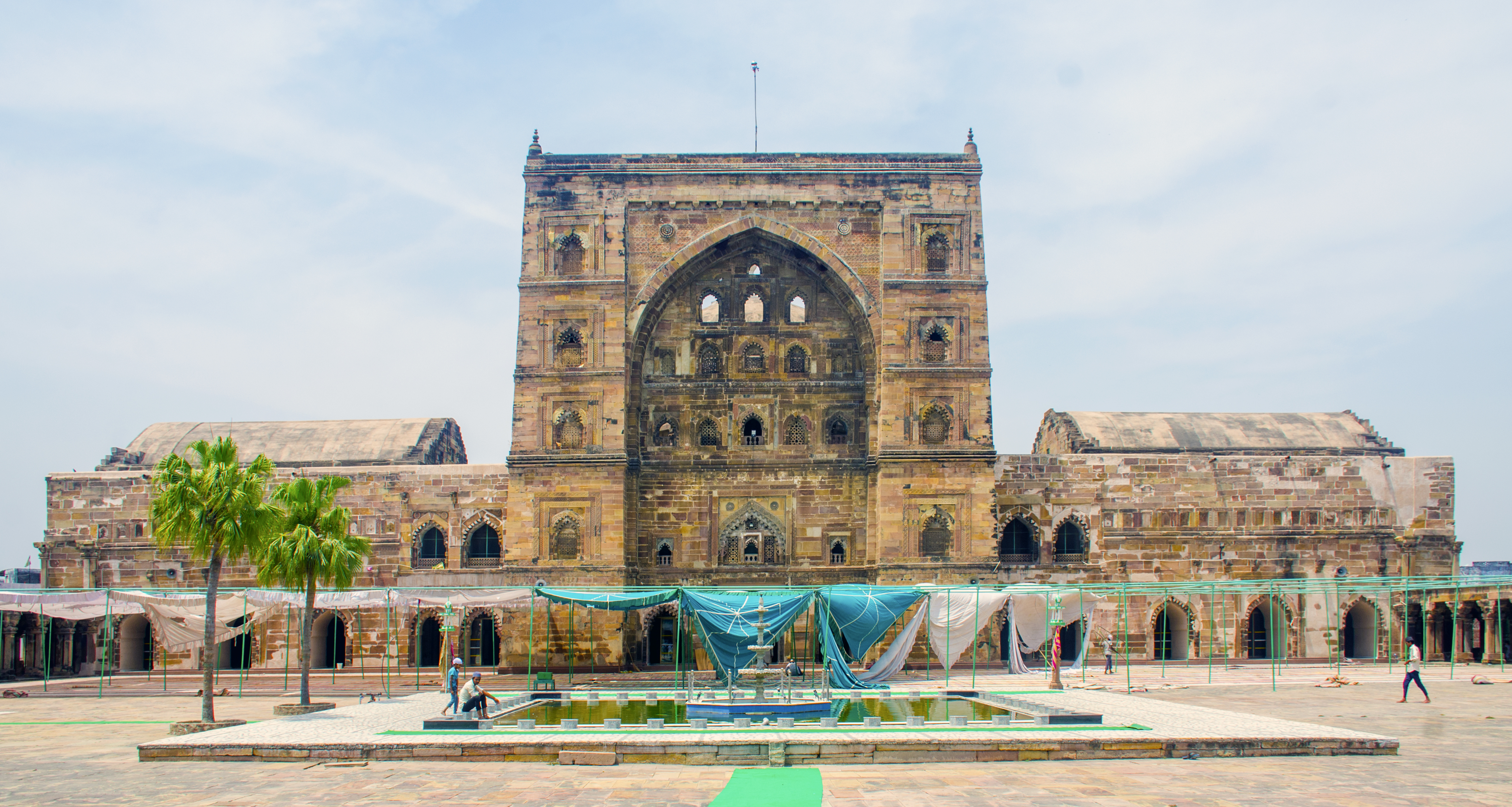
Jaunpur Jama Masjid

Tourist attractions in Jaunpur include monuments and religious sites.

=== Monuments ===
- Shahi Bridge
- Shahi Quila (Jaunpur Fort)

=== Religious sites ===
- Atala Masjid
- Jhanjhari Masjid
- Jama Masjid
- Lal Darwaza Masjid
- Sheetala Chaukia Dham Mandir

== Transportation ==
=== Rail ===
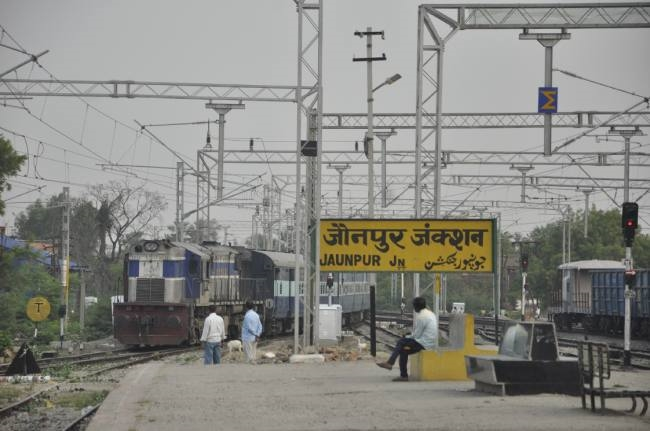
Jaunpur Junction

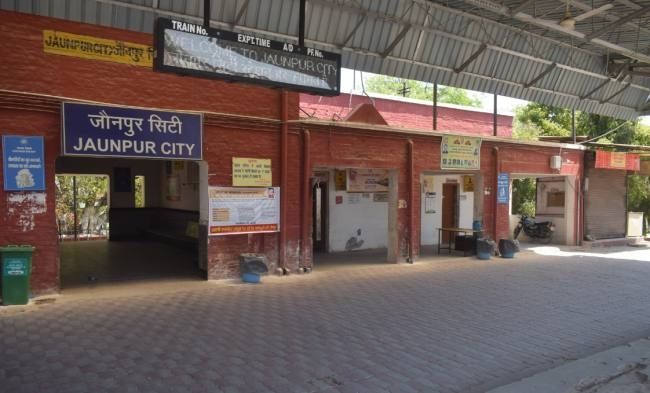
Jaunpur City

Jaunpur has four major railway stations: Jaunpur City Railway Station(JOP) and Jaunpur Junction (JNU), Shahganj Junction (SHG), Janghai Junction, Kerakat railway station (KCT).

=== Air ===
The nearest airport is Lal Bahadur Shastri Airport in Varanasi, which is roughly 39 km (24 mi) from the city.

== Education ==
=== University ===
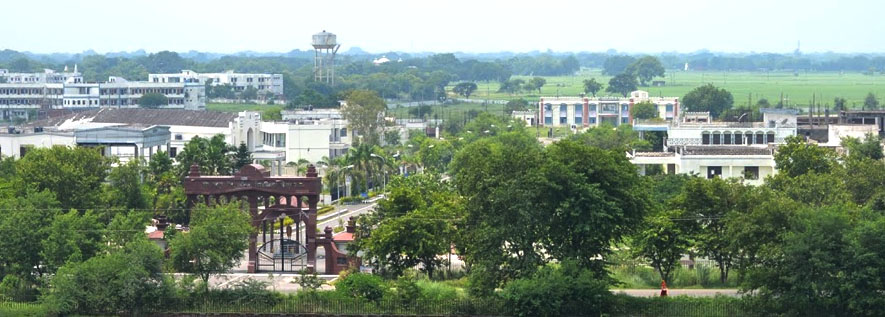
Aerial View of Main Campus of VBSPU

- Veer Bahadur Singh Purvanchal University, formerly Purvanchal University, is in Jaunpur.
- Umanath Singh Autonomous State Medical College (UNS ASMC), in Siddiqpur was inaugurated by Prime Minister under One District One medical college in late 2021.

=== Notable institutes ===
- Jawahar Navodaya Vidyalaya
- Prasad Institute of Technology, affiliated to Dr. A.P.J. Abdul Kalam Technical University
- Tilak Dhari Singh Post Graduate Degree College,

== Notable people ==
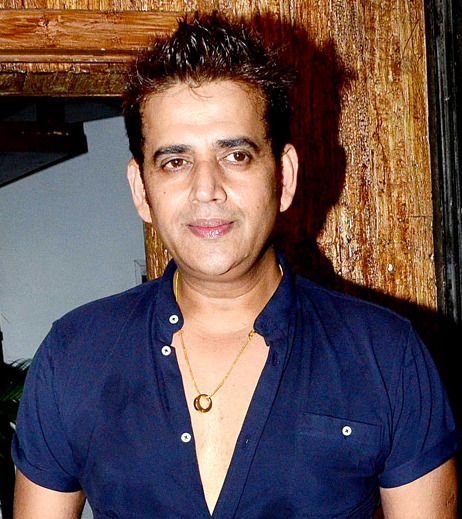
Ravi Kishan, a Bhojpuri film actor and Member of Parliament

Jagmohan Yadav addressing a press conference

- Hasan Abidi
- Sharadindu Bandyopadhyay
- Munna Bajrangi
- Banarasidas
- Ashok Bhushan
- Yadavendra Dutt Dubey
- Syed Wazir Hasan
- Majid Ali Jaunpuri, Islamic scholar
- Muhammad Jaunpuri
- Ravi Kishan
- Shailendra Yadav Lalai
- Mohammad Akram Nadwi, Islamic scholar
- Sushma Patel
- Urvashi Rai, Indian film actress
- Tribhuvan Ram
- Dhananjay Singh
- Harivansh Singh
- Indu Prakash Singh
- Kripashankar Singh
- Lalji Singh
- Shakeel Ahmed Samdani
- Jagdish Sonkar
- Rajesh Vivek
- Rambhadracharya, spiritual leader
- Gaurav Yadav, DGP of Punjab Police
- Girish Chandra Yadav
- Jagmohan Yadav, former DGP of Uttar Pradesh Police
- Jawahar Yadav, politician
- Lucky Yadav, politician
- Parasnath Yadav, politician, founding member of Samajwadi Party
- Surendra Kumar Yadav, judge
