= List of United Progressive Alliance candidates in the 2019 Indian general election =

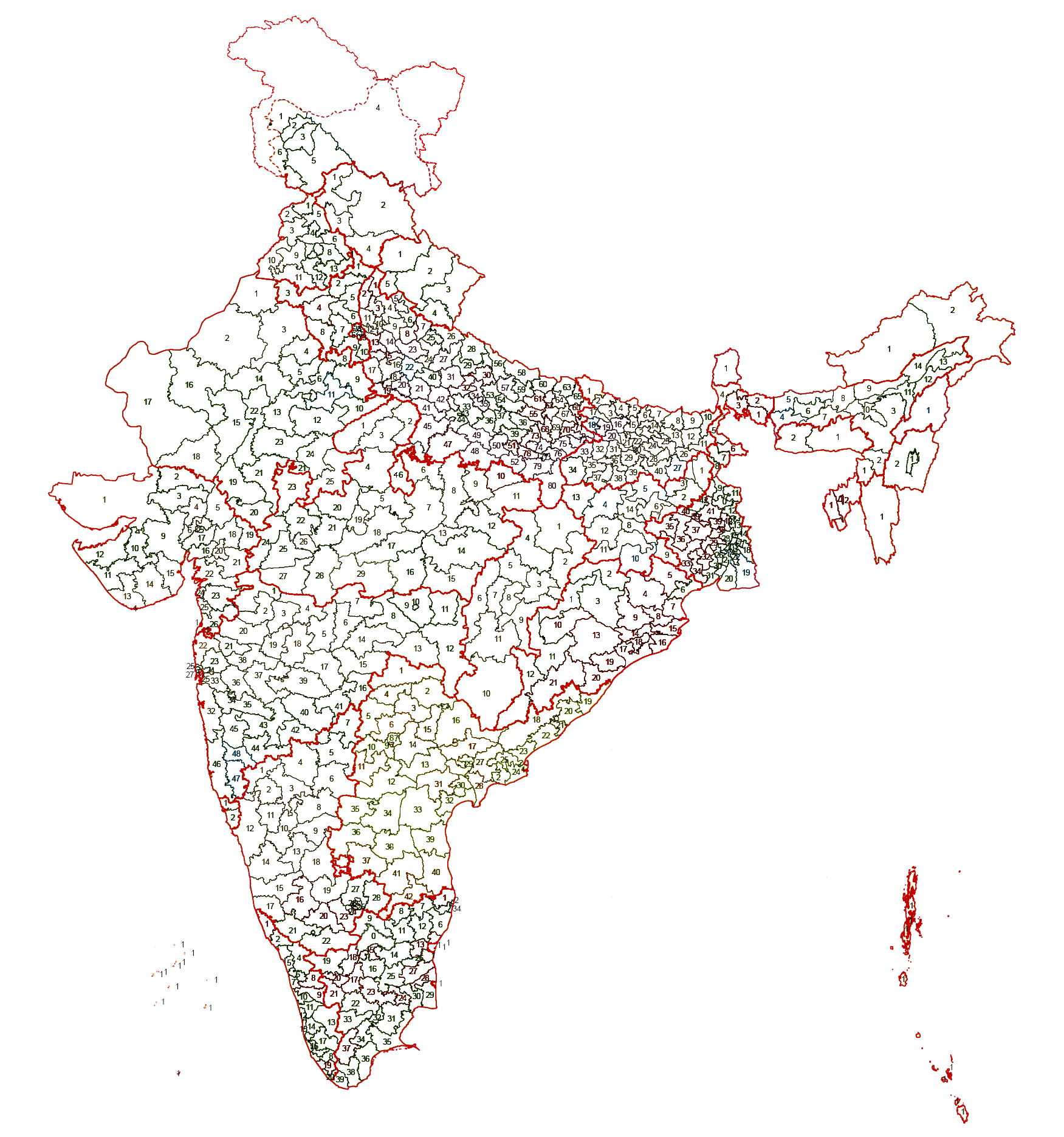
Lok Sabha constituencies of India

United Progressive Alliance was an Indian political party coalition led by Indian National Congress.

== Seat sharing summary ==
For the 2019 Indian general election, the UPA's is an alliance led by Indian National Congress with following parties:

Constituents of the United Progressive Alliance (Pre-poll Alliance)
| # | Party | Alliance in states | Seats sharing | References |
|---|---|---|---|---|
| 1 | Indian National Congress | All States and UTs | 421 | |
| 2 | Dravida Munnetra Kazhagam | Tamil Nadu | 20 | |
| 3 | Rashtriya Janata Dal | Bihar, Jharkhand | 20 | |
| 4 | Nationalist Congress Party | Maharashtra | 19 | |
| 5 | Janata Dal (Secular) | Karnataka | 7 | |
| 6 | Rashtriya Lok Samta Party | Bihar | 5 | |
| 7 | Jharkhand Mukti Morcha | Jharkhand, Odisha | 5 | |
| 8 | Communist Party of India (Marxist) | Odisha, Tamil Nadu | 3 | |
| 9 | Hindustani Awam Morcha | Bihar | 3 | |
| 10 | Vikassheel Insaan Party | Bihar | 3 | |
| 11 | Communist Party of India | Odisha, Tamil Nadu | 3 | |
| 12 | Indian Union Muslim League | Kerala, Tamil Nadu | 3 | |
| 13 | Jan adhikar party | Uttar Pradesh | 3 | |
| 14 | Viduthalai Chiruthaigal Katchi | Tamil Nadu | 2 | |
| 15 | Jharkhand Vikas Morcha (Prajatantrik) | Jharkhand | 2 | |
| 16 | Swabhimani Paksha | Maharashtra | 2 | |
| 17 | Bahujan Vikas Aaghadi | Maharashtra | 1 | |
| 18 | Communist Party of India (Marxist–Leninist) Liberation | Bihar | 1 | |
| 19 | Kerala Congress (M) | Kerala | 1 | |
| 20 | Revolutionary Socialist Party | Kerala | 1 | |
| 21 | Kongunadu Makkal Desia Katchi | Tamil Nadu | 1 | |
| 22 | Indhiya Jananayaga Katchi | Tamil Nadu | 1 | |
| 23 | Marumalarchi Dravida Munnetra Kazhagam | Tamil Nadu | 1 | |
| 24 | Jammu & Kashmir National Conference (supported by INC in Srinagar) | Jammu and Kashmir | 1 | |
| 25 | Navaneet Kaur (Independent candidate supported by INC in Amravati) | Maharashtra | 1 | |
| 26 | Lalnghinglova Hmar (Independent candidate supported by INC in Mizoram) | Mizoram | 1 | |
| 27 | Surendra Kumar Gupta (Independent candidate supported by INC in Pilibhit) | Uttar Pradesh | 1 | |
| Total UPA Candidates | | | 532 | |

For the 2019 Indian general election, the UPA's candidates for the Lok Sabha constituencies are as follows.

== Andhra Pradesh ==
INC (25)

| Constituency No. | Constituency | Reserved for (SC/ST/None) | Candidate | Party | Poll On | Result |
|---|---|---|---|---|---|---|
| 1 | Araku | ST | V. Shruti Devi | Indian National Congress | 11 April 2019 | Lost |
| 2 | Srikakulam | None | Dola Jaganmohan Rao | Indian National Congress | 11 April 2019 | Lost |
| 3 | Vizianagaram | None | Yedla Adiraju | Indian National Congress | 11 April 2019 | Lost |
| 4 | Visakhapatnam | None | Ramana Kumari Pedada | Indian National Congress | 11 April 2019 | Lost |
| 5 | Anakapalli | None | Sreeram Murthy | Indian National Congress | 11 April 2019 | Lost |
| 6 | Kakinada | None | M. M. Pallam Raju | Indian National Congress | 11 April 2019 | Lost |
| 7 | Amalapuram | SC | Janga Gowtham | Indian National Congress | 11 April 2019 | Lost |
| 8 | Rajahmundry | None | Nalluri Vijaya Srinivasa Rao | Indian National Congress | 11 April 2019 | Lost |
| 9 | Naraspur | None | Kanumuri Bapi Raju | Indian National Congress | 11 April 2019 | Lost |
| 10 | Eluru | None | Jetti Gurunadha Rao | Indian National Congress | 11 April 2019 | Lost |
| 11 | Machilipatnam | None | Golu Krishna | Indian National Congress | 11 April 2019 | Lost |
| 12 | Vijayawada | None | Naraharasetti Narasimha Rao | Indian National Congress | 11 April 2019 | Lost |
| 13 | Guntur | None | Shaik Mastan Vali | Indian National Congress | 11 April 2019 | Lost |
| 14 | Narasaraopet | None | Pakkala Suribabu | Indian National Congress | 11 April 2019 | Lost |
| 15 | Bapatla | SC | Jesudasu Seelam | Indian National Congress | 11 April 2019 | Lost |
| 16 | Ongole | None | Dr. SDJM Prasad | Indian National Congress | 11 April 2019 | Lost |
| 17 | Nandyal | None | J Lakshmi Narasimha Yadav | Indian National Congress | 11 April 2019 | Lost |
| 18 | Kurnool | None | Ahmed Ali Khan | Indian National Congress | 11 April 2019 | Lost |
| 19 | Anantapur | None | Kuncham Rajeev Reddy | Indian National Congress | 11 April 2019 | Lost |
| 20 | Hindupur | None | K. T. Sreedhar | Indian National Congress | 11 April 2019 | Lost |
| 21 | Kadapa | None | Gundlakunta Sreeramulu | Indian National Congress | 11 April 2019 | Lost |
| 22 | Nellore | None | Chevura Devkumar Reddy | Indian National Congress | 11 April 2019 | Lost |
| 23 | Tirupati | SC | Chinta Mohan | Indian National Congress | 11 April 2019 | Lost |
| 24 | Rajampet | None | Mohd. Shahjahan Basha | Indian National Congress | 11 April 2019 | Lost |
| 25 | Chittoor | SC | Cheemala Rangappa | Indian National Congress | 11 April 2019 | Lost |

== Arunachal Pradesh ==
INC (2)

| Constituency No. | Constituency | Reserved for (SC/ST/None) | Candidate | Party | Poll On | Result |
|---|---|---|---|---|---|---|
| 1 | Arunachal West | None | Nabam Tuki | Indian National Congress | 11 April 2019 | Lost |
| 2 | Arunachal East | None | James Lowangcha Wanglet | Indian National Congress | 11 April 2019 | Lost |

== Assam ==
INC (14)

| Constituency No. | Constituency | Reserved for (SC/ST/None) | Candidate | Party | Poll On | Result |
|---|---|---|---|---|---|---|
| 1 | Karimganj | SC | Swarup Das | Indian National Congress | 18 April 2019 | Lost |
| 2 | Silchar | None | Sushmita Dev | Indian National Congress | 18 April 2019 | Lost |
| 3 | Autonomous District | ST | Biren Singh Engti | Indian National Congress | 18 April 2019 | Lost |
| 4 | Dhubri | None | Abu Taher Ali Bepari | Indian National Congress | 23 April 2019 | Lost |
| 5 | Kokrajhar | ST | Sabda Ram Rabha | Indian National Congress | 23 April 2019 | Lost |
| 6 | Barpeta | None | Abdul Khaleque | Indian National Congress | 23 April 2019 | Won |
| 7 | Gauhati | None | Bobbeeta Sharma | Indian National Congress | 23 April 2019 | Lost |
| 8 | Mangaldoi | None | Bhubaneswar Kalita | Indian National Congress | 18 April 2019 | Lost |
| 9 | Tezpur | None | MGVK Bhanu | Indian National Congress | 11 April 2019 | Lost |
| 10 | Nowgong | None | Pradyut Bordoloi | Indian National Congress | 18 April 2019 | Won |
| 11 | Kaliabor | None | Gaurav Gogoi | Indian National Congress | 11 April 2019 | Won |
| 12 | Jorhat | None | Sushanta Borgohain | Indian National Congress | 11 April 2019 | Lost |
| 13 | Dibrugarh | None | Paban Singh Ghatowar | Indian National Congress | 11 April 2019 | Lost |
| 14 | Lakhimpur | None | Anil Borgohain | Indian National Congress | 11 April 2019 | Lost |

== Bihar ==
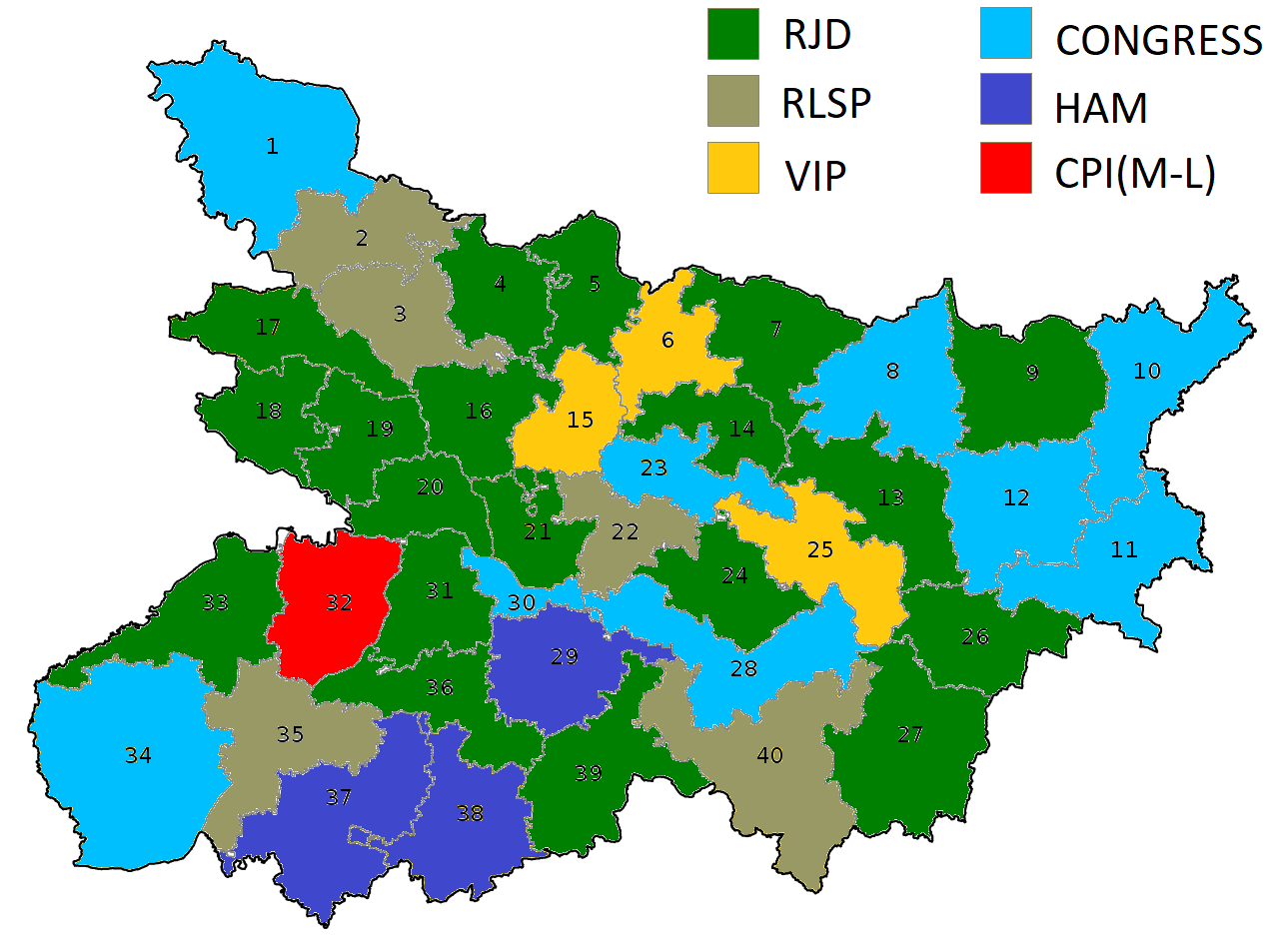
Bihar UPA

RJD (19) INC (9) RLSP (5) HAM(3) VIP (3) CPI (M-L) (1)

| Constituency No. | Constituency | Reserved for (SC/ST/None) | Candidate | Party | Poll On | Result |
|---|---|---|---|---|---|---|
| 1 | Valmiki Nagar | None | Shashwat Kedar | Indian National Congress | 12 May 2019 | Lost |
| 2 | Paschim Champaran | None | Brajesh Kumar Kushwaha | Rashtriya Lok Samta Party | 12 May 2019 | Lost |
| 3 | Purvi Champaran | None | Akash Kumar Singh | Rashtriya Lok Samta Party | 12 May 2019 | Lost |
| 4 | Sheohar | None | Syed Faisal Ali | Rashtriya Janata Dal | 12 May 2019 | Lost |
| 5 | Sitamarhi | None | Arjun Rai | Rashtriya Janata Dal | 6 May 2019 | Lost |
| 6 | Madhubani | None | Badrinath Purve | Vikassheel Insaan Party | 6 May 2019 | Lost |
| 7 | Jhanjharpur | None | Gulab Yadav | Rashtriya Janata Dal | 23 April 2019 | Lost |
| 8 | Supaul | None | Ranjeet Ranjan | Indian National Congress | 23 April 2019 | Lost |
| 9 | Araria | None | Sarfaraz Alam | Rashtriya Janata Dal | 23 April 2019 | Lost |
| 10 | Kishanganj | None | Mohammad Jawed | Indian National Congress | 18 April 2019 | Won |
| 11 | Katihar | None | Tariq Anwar | Indian National Congress | 18 April 2019 | Lost |
| 12 | Purnia | None | Uday Singh aka Pappu Singh | Indian National Congress | 18 April 2019 | Lost |
| 13 | Madhepura | None | Sharad Yadav | Rashtriya Janata Dal | 23 April 2019 | Lost |
| 14 | Darbhanga | None | Abdul Bari Siddiqui | Rashtriya Janata Dal | 29 April 2019 | Lost |
| 15 | Muzaffarpur | None | Rajbhushan Choudhary Nishad | Vikassheel Insaan Party | 6 May 2019 | Lost |
| 16 | Vaishali | None | Raghuvansh Prasad Singh | Rashtriya Janata Dal | 12 May 2019 | Lost |
| 17 | Gopalganj | SC | Surinder Ram | Rashtriya Janata Dal | 12 May 2019 | Lost |
| 18 | Siwan | None | Hena Shahab | Rashtriya Janata Dal | 12 May 2019 | Lost |
| 19 | Maharajganj | None | Randhir Singh | Rashtriya Janata Dal | 12 May 2019 | Lost |
| 20 | Saran | None | Chandrika Rai | Rashtriya Janata Dal | 6 May 2019 | Lost |
| 21 | Hajipur | SC | Shrichandra Ram | Rashtriya Janata Dal | 6 May 2019 | Lost |
| 22 | Ujiarpur | None | Upendra Kushwaha | Rashtriya Lok Samta Party | 29 April 2019 | Lost |
| 23 | Samastipur | None | Dr. Ashok Kumar | Indian National Congress | 29 April 2019 | Lost |
| 24 | Begusarai | None | Tanveer Hasan | Rashtriya Janata Dal | 29 April 2019 | Lost |
| 25 | Khagaria | None | Mukesh Sahni | Vikassheel Insaan Party | 23 April 2019 | Lost |
| 26 | Bhagalpur | None | Bulo Mandal | Rashtriya Janata Dal | 18 April 2019 | Lost |
| 27 | Banka | None | Jay Prakash Narayan Yadav | Rashtriya Janata Dal | 18 April 2019 | Lost |
| 28 | Munger | None | Neelam Devi | Indian National Congress | 29 April 2019 | Lost |
| 29 | Nalanda | None | Ashok Kumar Azad Chandravanshi | Hindustani Awam Morcha | 19 May 2019 | Lost |
| 30 | Patna Sahib | None | Shatrughan Sinha | Indian National Congress | 19 May 2019 | Lost |
| 31 | Pataliputra | None | Misa Bharti | Rashtriya Janata Dal | 19 May 2019 | Lost |
| 32 | Arrah | None | Raju Yadav | Communist Party of India (M-L) | 19 May 2019 | Lost |
| 33 | Buxar | None | Jagdanand Singh | Rashtriya Janata Dal | 19 May 2019 | Lost |
| 34 | Sasaram | SC | Meira Kumar | Indian National Congress | 19 May 2019 | Lost |
| 35 | Karakat | None | Upendra Kushwaha | Rashtriya Lok Samta Party | 19 May 2019 | Lost |
| 36 | Jahanabad | None | Surendra Yadav | Rashtriya Janata Dal | 19 May 2019 | Lost |
| 37 | Aurangabad | None | Upendra Prasad | Hindustani Awam Morcha | 11 April 2019 | Lost |
| 38 | Gaya | SC | Jitan Ram Manjhi | Hindustani Awam Morcha | 11 April 2019 | Lost |
| 39 | Nawada | None | Vibha Devi | Rashtriya Janata Dal | 11 April 2019 | Lost |
| 40 | Jamui | SC | Bhudeo Choudhary | Rashtriya Lok Samta Party | 11 April 2019 | Lost |

== Chhattisgarh ==
INC (11)

| Constituency No. | Constituency | Reserved for (SC/ST/None) | Candidate | Party | Poll On | Result |
|---|---|---|---|---|---|---|
| 1 | Sarguja | ST | Khel Sai Singh | Indian National Congress | 23 April 2019 | Lost |
| 2 | Raigarh | ST | Laljeet Singh Rathia | Indian National Congress | 23 April 2019 | Lost |
| 3 | Janjgir | SC | Ravi Bhardwaj | Indian National Congress | 23 April 2019 | Lost |
| 4 | Korba | None | Jyotsna Mahant | Indian National Congress | 23 April 2019 | Won |
| 5 | Bilaspur | None | Atal Shrivastav | Indian National Congress | 23 April 2019 | Lost |
| 6 | Rajnandgaon | None | Bholaram Sahu | Indian National Congress | 18 April 2019 | Lost |
| 7 | Durg | None | Pratima Chandrakar | Indian National Congress | 23 April 2019 | Lost |
| 8 | Raipur | None | Pramod Dubey | Indian National Congress | 23 April 2019 | Lost |
| 9 | Mahasamund | None | Dhanendra Sahu | Indian National Congress | 18 April 2019 | Lost |
| 10 | Bastar | ST | Deepak Baij | Indian National Congress | 11 April 2019 | Won |
| 11 | Kanker | ST | Biresh Thakur | Indian National Congress | 18 April 2019 | Lost |

== Goa ==
INC (2)

| Constituency No. | Constituency | Reserved for (SC/ST/None) | Candidate | Party | Poll On | Result |
|---|---|---|---|---|---|---|
| 1 | North Goa | SC | Girish Chodankar | Indian National Congress | 23 April 2019 | Lost |
| 2 | South Goa | None | Francisco Sardinha | Indian National Congress | 23 April 2019 | Won |

== Gujarat ==
INC (26)

| Constituency No. | Constituency | Reserved for (SC/ST/None) | Candidate | Party | Poll On | Result |
|---|---|---|---|---|---|---|
| 1 | Kachchh | SC | Naresh N. Maheshwari | Indian National Congress | 23 April 2019 | Lost |
| 2 | Banaskantha | None | Parthi Bhatol | Indian National Congress | 23 April 2019 | Lost |
| 3 | Patan | None | Jagdish Thakor | Indian National Congress | 23 April 2019 | Lost |
| 4 | Mahesana | None | A J Patel | Indian National Congress | 23 April 2019 | Lost |
| 5 | Sabarkantha | None | Rajendra Thakor | Indian National Congress | 23 April 2019 | Lost |
| 6 | Gandhinagar | None | C. J. Chavada | Indian National Congress | 23 April 2019 | Lost |
| 7 | Ahmedabad East | None | Geetaben Patel | Indian National Congress | 23 April 2019 | Lost |
| 8 | Ahmedabad West | SC | Raju Parmar | Indian National Congress | 23 April 2019 | Lost |
| 9 | Surendranagar | None | Somabhai Patel | Indian National Congress | 23 April 2019 | Lost |
| 10 | Rajkot | None | Lalit Kagathara | Indian National Congress | 23 April 2019 | Lost |
| 11 | Porbandar | None | Lalit Vasoya | Indian National Congress | 23 April 2019 | Lost |
| 12 | Jamnagar | None | Murubhai Kandoriya Ahir | Indian National Congress | 23 April 2019 | Lost |
| 13 | Junagadh | None | Punjabhai Vansh | Indian National Congress | 23 April 2019 | Lost |
| 14 | Amreli | None | Paresh Dhanani | Indian National Congress | 23 April 2019 | Lost |
| 15 | Bhavnagar | None | Manhar Patel | Indian National Congress | 23 April 2019 | Lost |
| 16 | Anand | None | Bharatsinh Solanki | Indian National Congress | 23 April 2019 | Lost |
| 17 | Kheda | None | Bimal Shah | Indian National Congress | 23 April 2019 | Lost |
| 18 | Panchmahal | None | V K Khant | Indian National Congress | 23 April 2019 | Lost |
| 19 | Dahod | ST | Babubhai Katara | Indian National Congress | 23 April 2019 | Lost |
| 20 | Vadodara | None | Prashant Patel | Indian National Congress | 23 April 2019 | Lost |
| 21 | Chhota Udaipur | ST | Ranjit Mohansinh Rathwa | Indian National Congress | 23 April 2019 | Lost |
| 22 | Bharuch | None | Sherkhan Abdul Shakur Pathan | Indian National Congress | 23 April 2019 | Lost |
| 23 | Bardoli | ST | Tushar Chaudhary | Indian National Congress | 23 April 2019 | Lost |
| 24 | Surat | None | Ashok Adhevada | Indian National Congress | 23 April 2019 | Lost |
| 25 | Navsari | None | Dharmesh Bhimbhai Patel | Indian National Congress | 23 April 2019 | Lost |
| 26 | Valsad | ST | Jitu Chaudhary | Indian National Congress | 23 April 2019 | Lost |

== Haryana ==
INC (10)

| Constituency No. | Constituency | Reserved for (SC/ST/None) | Candidate | Party | Poll On | Result |
|---|---|---|---|---|---|---|
| 1 | Ambala | SC | Selja Kumari | Indian National Congress | 12 May 2019 | Lost |
| 2 | Kurukshetra | None | Nirmal Singh (Haryana) | Indian National Congress | 12 May 2019 | Lost |
| 3 | Sirsa | SC | Ashok Tanwar | Indian National Congress | 12 May 2019 | Lost |
| 4 | Hissar | None | Bhavya Bishnoi | Indian National Congress | 12 May 2019 | Lost |
| 5 | Karnal | None | Kuldeep Sharma | Indian National Congress | 12 May 2019 | Lost |
| 6 | Sonipat | None | Bhupinder Singh Hooda | Indian National Congress | 12 May 2019 | Lost |
| 7 | Rohtak | None | Deepender Singh Hooda | Indian National Congress | 12 May 2019 | Lost |
| 8 | Bhiwani–Mahendragarh | None | Shruti Chaudhary | Indian National Congress | 12 May 2019 | Lost |
| 9 | Gurgaon | None | Ajay Singh Yadav | Indian National Congress | 12 May 2019 | Lost |
| 10 | Faridabad | None | Avtar Singh Bhadana | Indian National Congress | 12 May 2019 | Lost |

== Himachal Pradesh ==
INC (4)

| Constituency No. | Constituency | Reserved for (SC/ST/None) | Candidate | Party | Poll On | Result |
|---|---|---|---|---|---|---|
| 1 | Kangra | None | Pawan Kajal | Indian National Congress | 19 May 2019 | Lost |
| 2 | Mandi | None | Ashray Sharma | Indian National Congress | 19 May 2019 | Lost |
| 3 | Hamirpur | None | Ram Lal Thakur | Indian National Congress | 19 May 2019 | Lost |
| 4 | Shimla | SC | Dhani Ram Shandil | Indian National Congress | 19 May 2019 | Lost |

== Jammu and Kashmir ==
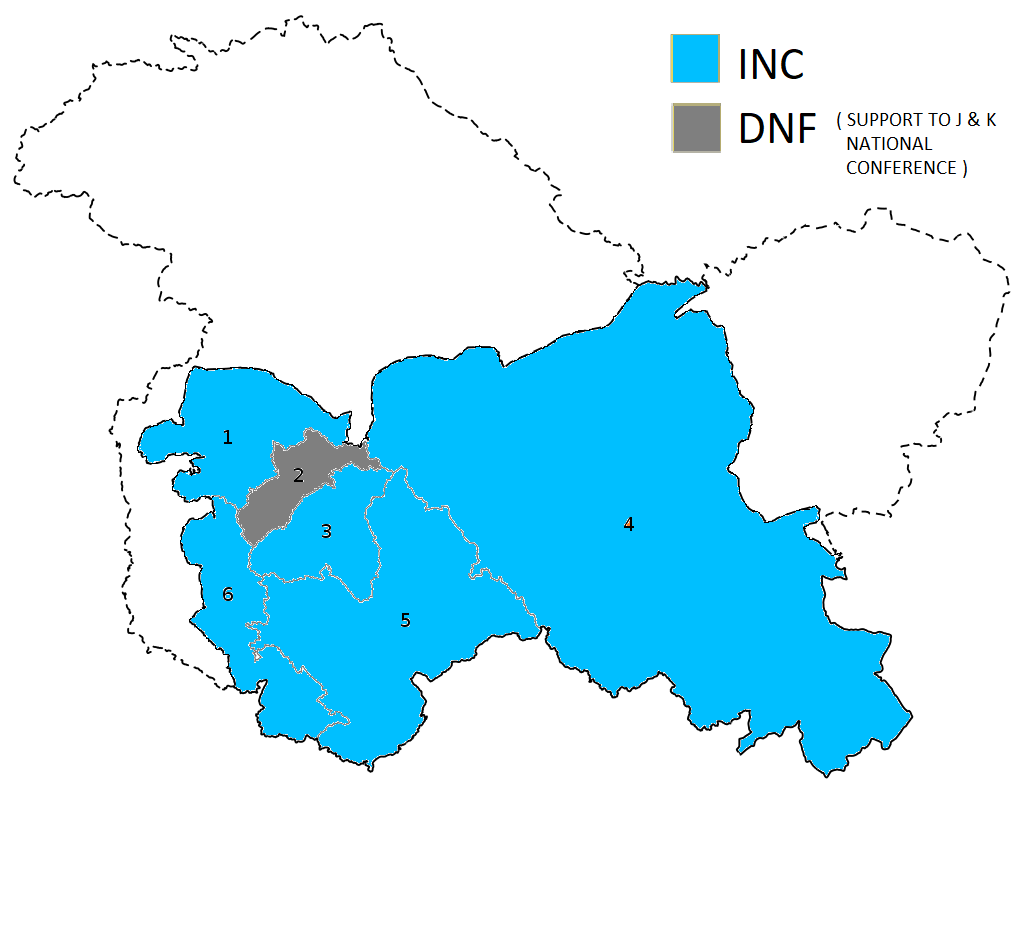
Jammu & Kashmir UPA

INC (5) JKNC (1)

| Constituency No. | Constituency | Reserved for (SC/ST/None) | Candidate | Party | Poll On | Result |
|---|---|---|---|---|---|---|
| 1 | Baramulla | None | Haji Farooq Mir | Indian National Congress | 11 April 2019 | Lost |
| 2 | Srinagar | None | Farooq Abdullah | Jammu & Kashmir National Conference (supported by INC) | 18 April 2019 | Won |
| 3 | Anantnag | None | Ghulam Ahmad Mir | Indian National Congress | 23 April 2019; 29 April 2019; 6 May 2019 | Lost |
| 4 | Ladakh | None | Rigzin Spalbar | Indian National Congress | 6 May 2019 | Lost |
| 5 | Udhampur | None | Vikramaditya Singh | Indian National Congress | 18 April 2019 | Lost |
| 6 | Jammu | None | Raman Bhalla | Indian National Congress | 11 April 2019 | Lost |

== Jharkhand ==
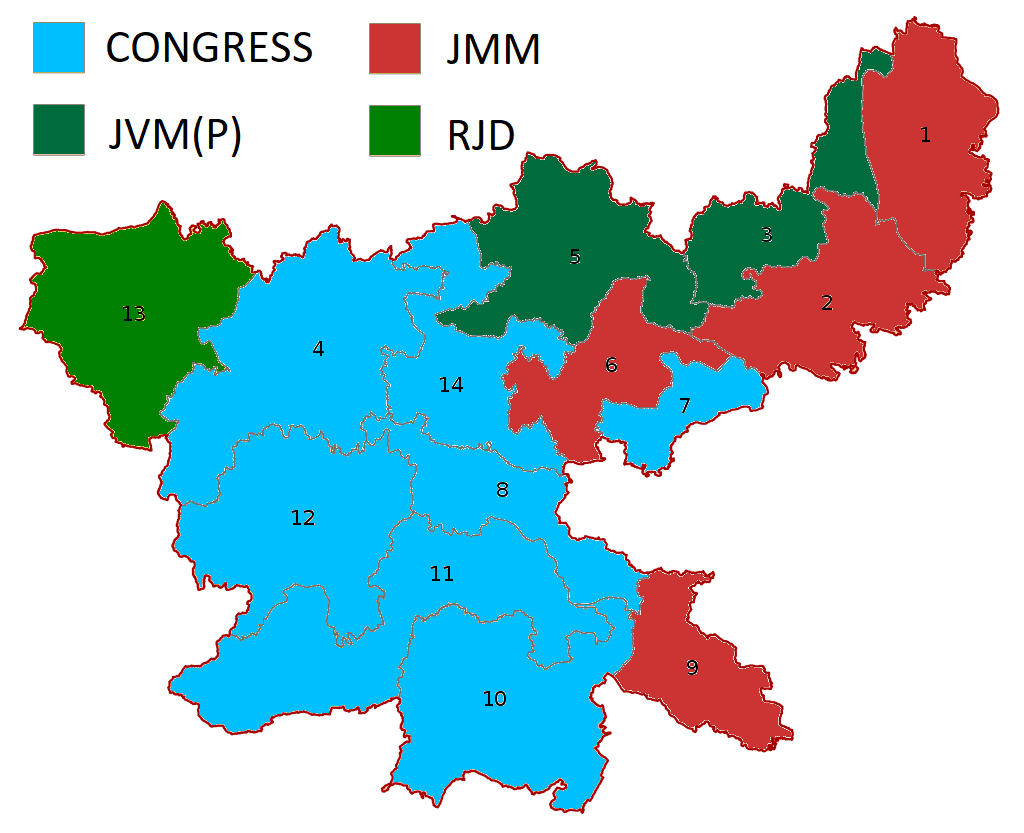
Jharkhand UPA

INC (7) JMM (4) JVM (2) RJD (1)

| Constituency No. | Constituency | Reserved for (SC/ST/None) | Candidate | Party | Poll On | Result |
|---|---|---|---|---|---|---|
| 1 | Rajmahal | ST | Vijay Hansdak | Jharkhand Mukti Morcha | 19 May 2019 | Won |
| 2 | Dumka | ST | Shibu Soren | Jharkhand Mukti Morcha | 19 May 2019 | Lost |
| 3 | Godda | None | Pradeep Yadav | Jharkhand Vikas Morcha | 19 May 2019 | Lost |
| 4 | Chatra | None | Manoj Kumar Yadav | Indian National Congress | 29 April 2019 | Lost |
| 5 | Kodarma | None | Babulal Marandi | Jharkhand Vikas Morcha | 6 May 2019 | Lost |
| 6 | Giridih | None | Jagarnath Mahto | Jharkhand Mukti Morcha | 12 May 2019 | Lost |
| 7 | Dhanbad | None | Kirti Azad | Indian National Congress | 12 May 2019 | Lost |
| 8 | Ranchi | None | Subodh Kant Sahay | Indian National Congress | 6 May 2019 | Lost |
| 9 | Jamshedpur | None | Champai Soren | Jharkhand Mukti Morcha | 12 May 2019 | Lost |
| 10 | Singhbhum | ST | Geeta Koda | Indian National Congress | 12 May 2019 | Won |
| 11 | Khunti | ST | Kali Charan Munda | Indian National Congress | 6 May 2019 | Lost |
| 12 | Lohardaga | ST | Sukhdeo Bhagat | Indian National Congress | 29 April 2019 | Lost |
| 13 | Palamau | SC | Ghuran Ram | Rashtriya Janata Dal | 29 April 2019 | Lost |
| 14 | Hazaribagh | None | Gopal Sahu | Indian National Congress | 6 May 2019 | Lost |

== Karnataka ==
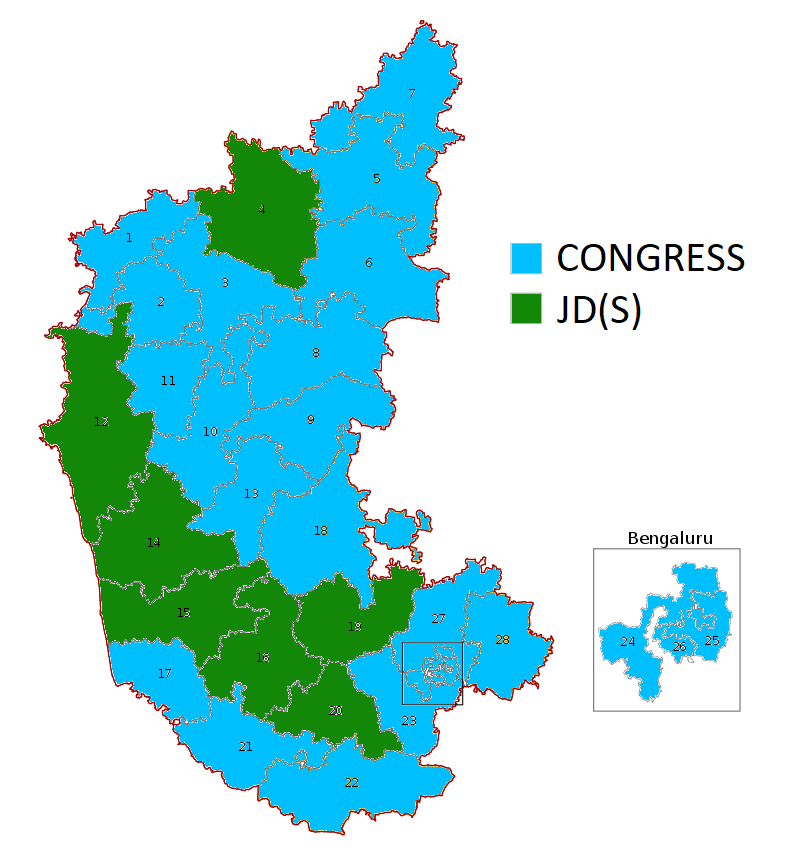
Karnataka UPA

INC (21) JD(S) (7)

| Constituency No. | Constituency | Reserved for (SC/ST/None) | Candidate | Party | Poll On | Result |
|---|---|---|---|---|---|---|
| 1 | Chikkodi | None | Prakash Babanna Hukkeri | Indian National Congress | 23 April 2019 | Lost |
| 2 | Belagavi | None | Virupakshi S Sadhunavar | Indian National Congress | 23 April 2019 | Lost |
| 3 | Bagalkot | None | Veena Kashappanavar | Indian National Congress | 23 April 2019 | Lost |
| 4 | Bijapur | SC | Sunitha Devanand Chavan | Janata Dal (Secular) | 23 April 2019 | Lost |
| 5 | Kalaburagi | SC | Mallikarjun Kharge | Indian National Congress | 23 April 2019 | Lost |
| 6 | Raichur | ST | B. V. Nayak | Indian National Congress | 23 April 2019 | Lost |
| 7 | Bidar | None | Eshwara Khandre | Indian National Congress | 23 April 2019 | Lost |
| 8 | Koppal | None | Rajashekar Hitnal | Indian National Congress | 23 April 2019 | Lost |
| 9 | Bellary | ST | V. S. Ugrappa | Indian National Congress | 23 April 2019 | Lost |
| 10 | Haveri | None | D. R. Patil | Indian National Congress | 23 April 2019 | Lost |
| 11 | Dharwad | None | Vinay Kulkarni | Indian National Congress | 23 April 2019 | Lost |
| 12 | Uttara Kannada | None | Anand Asnotikar | Janata Dal (Secular) | 23 April 2019 | Lost |
| 13 | Davanagere | None | H. B. Manjappa | Indian National Congress | 23 April 2019 | Lost |
| 14 | Shimoga | None | Madhu Bangarappa | Janata Dal (Secular) | 23 April 2019 | Lost |
| 15 | Udupi Chikmagalur | None | Pramod Madhwaraj | Janata Dal (Secular) | 18 April 2019 | Lost |
| 16 | Hassan | None | Prajwal Revanna | Janata Dal (Secular) | 18 April 2019 | Won |
| 17 | Dakshina Kannada | None | Mithun Rai | Indian National Congress | 18 April 2019 | Lost |
| 18 | Chitradurga | SC | B. N. Chandrappa | Indian National Congress | 18 April 2019 | Lost |
| 19 | Tumkur | None | H. D. Deve Gowda | Janata Dal (Secular) | 18 April 2019 | Lost |
| 20 | Mandya | None | Nikhil Gowda | Janata Dal (Secular) | 18 April 2019 | Lost |
| 21 | Mysore | None | C. H. Vijayashankar | Indian National Congress | 18 April 2019 | Lost |
| 22 | Chamarajanagar | SC | R. Dhruvanarayana | Indian National Congress | 18 April 2019 | Lost |
| 23 | Bangalore Rural | None | D. K. Suresh | Indian National Congress | 18 April 2019 | Won |
| 24 | Bangalore North | None | Krishna Byre Gowda | Indian National Congress | 18 April 2019 | Lost |
| 25 | Bangalore Central | None | Rizwan Arshad | Indian National Congress | 18 April 2019 | Lost |
| 26 | Bangalore South | None | B. K. Hariprasad | Indian National Congress | 18 April 2019 | Lost |
| 27 | Chikballapur | None | Veerappa Moily | Indian National Congress | 18 April 2019 | Lost |
| 28 | Kolar | SC | K. H. Muniyappa | Indian National Congress | 18 April 2019 | Lost |

== Kerala ==
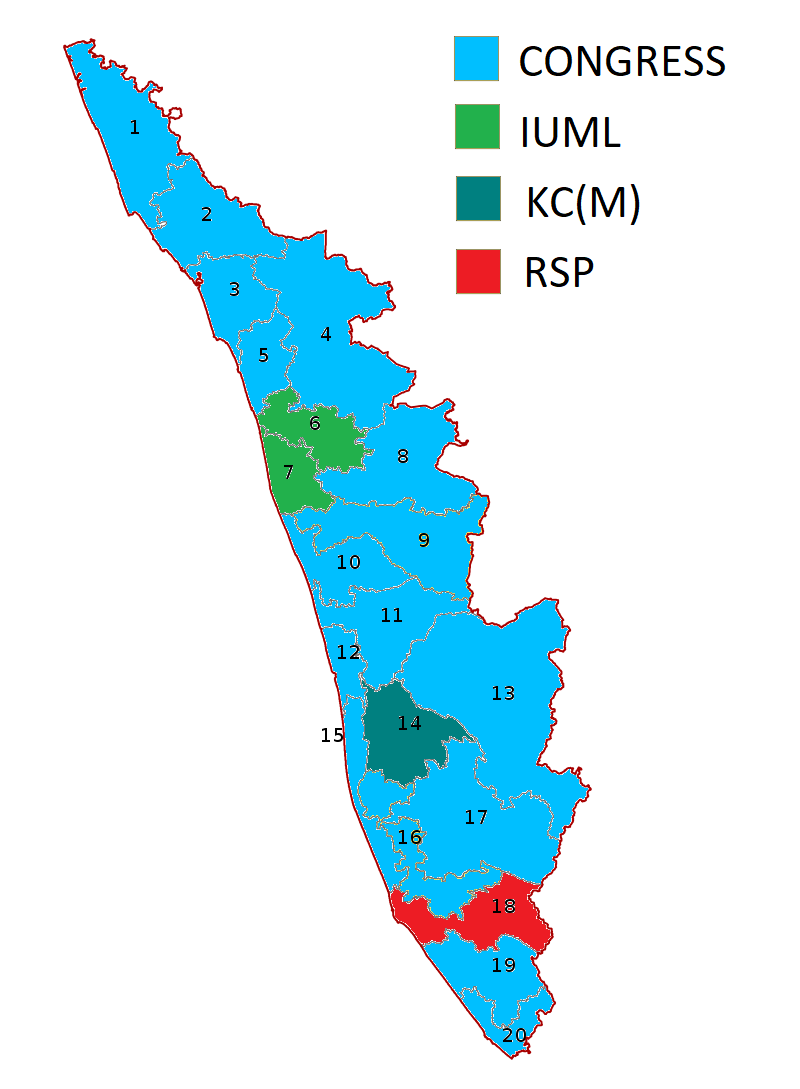
Kerala UPA

INC (16) IUML (2) RSP (1) KC(M) (1)

| Constituency No. | Constituency | Reserved for (SC/ST/None) | Candidate | Party | Poll On | Result |
|---|---|---|---|---|---|---|
| 1 | Kasaragod | None | Rajmohan Unnithan | Indian National Congress | 23 April 2019 | Won |
| 2 | Kannur | None | K. Sudhakaran | Indian National Congress | 23 April 2019 | Won |
| 3 | Vatakara | None | K. Muraleedharan | Indian National Congress | 23 April 2019 | Won |
| 4 | Wayanad | None | Rahul Gandhi | Indian National Congress | 23 April 2019 | Won |
| 5 | Kozhikode | None | M. K. Raghavan | Indian National Congress | 23 April 2019 | Won |
| 6 | Malappuram | None | P. K. Kunhalikutty | Indian Union Muslim League | 23 April 2019 | Won |
| 7 | Ponnani | None | E. T. Mohammed Basheer | Indian Union Muslim League | 23 April 2019 | Won |
| 8 | Palakkad | None | V.K Sreekandan | Indian National Congress | 23 April 2019 | Won |
| 9 | Alathur | SC | Remya Haridas | Indian National Congress | 23 April 2019 | Won |
| 10 | Thrissur | None | T. N. Prathapan | Indian National Congress | 23 April 2019 | Won |
| 11 | Chalakudy | None | Benny Behanan | Indian National Congress | 23 April 2019 | Won |
| 12 | Ernakulam | None | Hibi Eden | Indian National Congress | 23 April 2019 | Won |
| 13 | Idukki | None | Dean Kuriakose | Indian National Congress | 23 April 2019 | Won |
| 14 | Kottayam | None | Thomas Chazhikadan | Kerala Congress (M) | 23 April 2019 | Won |
| 15 | Alappuzha | None | Shanimol Usman | Indian National Congress | 23 April 2019 | Lost |
| 16 | Mavelikara | SC | Kodikunnil Suresh | Indian National Congress | 23 April 2019 | Won |
| 17 | Pathanamthitta | None | Anto Antony | Indian National Congress | 23 April 2019 | Won |
| 18 | Kollam | None | N. K. Premachandran | Revolutionary Socialist Party | 23 April 2019 | Won |
| 19 | Attingal | None | Adoor Prakash | Indian National Congress | 23 April 2019 | Won |
| 20 | Thiruvananthapuram | None | Shashi Tharoor | Indian National Congress | 23 April 2019 | Won |

== Madhya Pradesh ==
INC (29)

| Constituency No. | Constituency | Reserved for (SC/ST/None) | Candidate | Party | Poll On | Result |
|---|---|---|---|---|---|---|
| 1 | Morena | None | Ramnivas Rawat | Indian National Congress | 12 May 2019 | Lost |
| 2 | Bhind | SC | Devasish Jararia | Indian National Congress | 12 May 2019 | Lost |
| 3 | Gwalior | None | Ashok Singh | Indian National Congress | 12 May 2019 | Lost |
| 4 | Guna | None | Jyotiraditya Madhavrao Scindia | Indian National Congress | 12 May 2019 | Lost |
| 5 | Sagar | None | Prabhu Singh Thakur | Indian National Congress | 12 May 2019 | Lost |
| 6 | Tikamgarh | SC | Kiran Ahirwar | Indian National Congress | 6 May 2019 | Lost |
| 7 | Damoh | None | Pratap Singh Lodhi | Indian National Congress | 6 May 2019 | Lost |
| 8 | Khajuraho | None | Kavita Singh | Indian National Congress | 6 May 2019 | Lost |
| 9 | Satna | None | Raja Ram Tripathi | Indian National Congress | 6 May 2019 | Lost |
| 10 | Rewa | None | Siddharth Tiwari | Indian National Congress | 6 May 2019 | Lost |
| 11 | Sidhi | None | Ajay Singh Rahul | Indian National Congress | 29 April 2019 | Lost |
| 12 | Shahdol | ST | Pramila Singh | Indian National Congress | 29 April 2019 | Lost |
| 13 | Jabalpur | None | Vivek Tankha | Indian National Congress | 29 April 2019 | Lost |
| 14 | Mandla | ST | Kamal Maravi | Indian National Congress | 29 April 2019 | Lost |
| 15 | Balaghat | None | Madhu Bhagat | Indian National Congress | 29 April 2019 | Lost |
| 16 | Chhindwara | None | Nakul Nath | Indian National Congress | 29 April 2019 | Won |
| 17 | Hoshangabad | None | Shailendra Diwan | Indian National Congress | 6 May 2019 | Lost |
| 18 | Vidisha | None | Shailendra Patel | Indian National Congress | 12 May 2019 | Lost |
| 19 | Bhopal | None | Digvijaya Singh | Indian National Congress | 12 May 2019 | Lost |
| 20 | Rajgarh | None | Mona Sustani | Indian National Congress | 12 May 2019 | Lost |
| 21 | Dewas | SC | Prahlad Tipaniya | Indian National Congress | 19 May 2019 | Lost |
| 22 | Ujjain | SC | Babulal Malviya | Indian National Congress | 19 May 2019 | Lost |
| 23 | Mandsaur | None | Meenakshi Natarajan | Indian National Congress | 19 May 2019 | Lost |
| 24 | Ratlam | ST | Kantilal Bhuria | Indian National Congress | 19 May 2019 | Lost |
| 25 | Dhar | ST | Dinesh Girwal | Indian National Congress | 19 May 2019 | Lost |
| 26 | Indore | None | Pankaj Sanghvi | Indian National Congress | 19 May 2019 | Lost |
| 27 | Khargone | ST | Govind Muzaalda | Indian National Congress | 19 May 2019 | Lost |
| 28 | Khandwa | None | Arun Yadav | Indian National Congress | 19 May 2019 | Lost |
| 29 | Betul | ST | Ramu Tekam | Indian National Congress | 6 May 2019 | Lost |

== Maharashtra ==
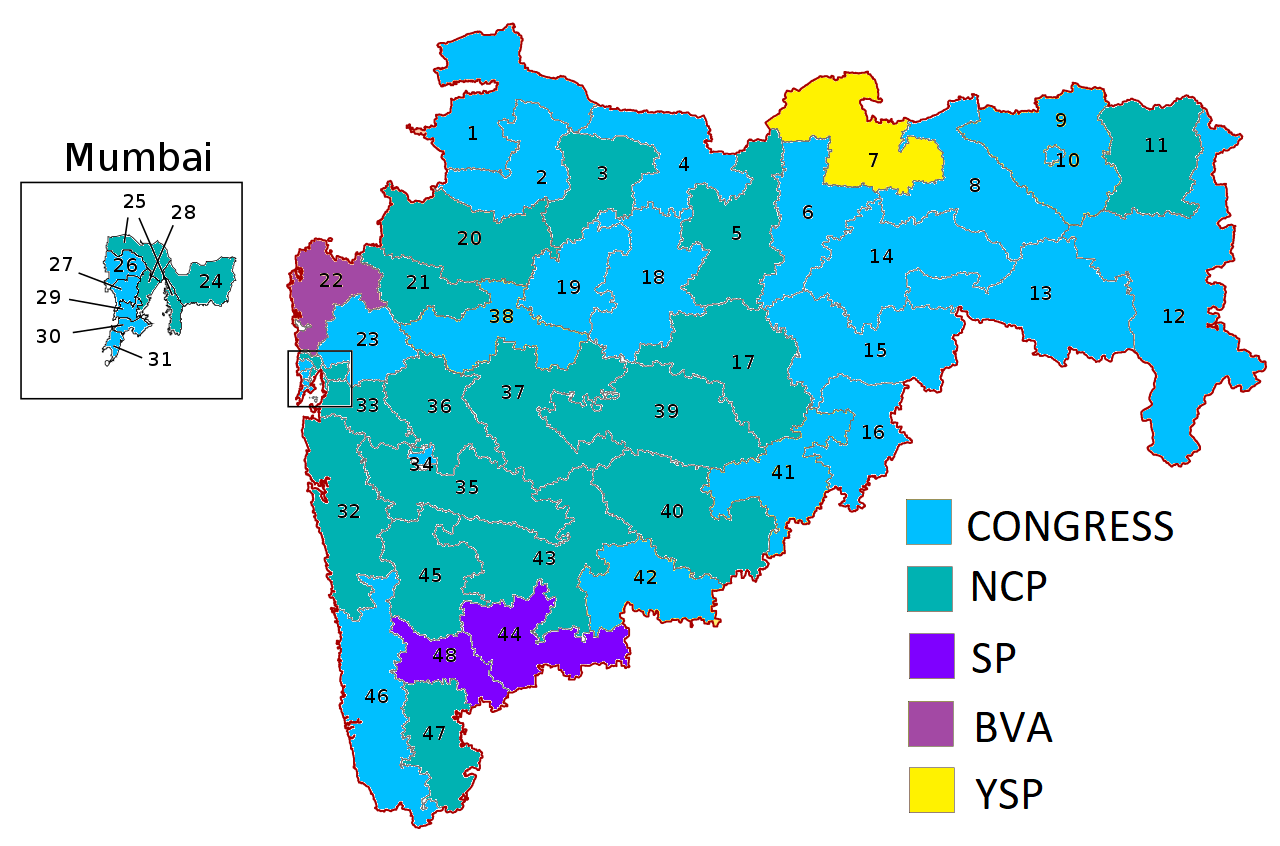
Maharashtra UPA

INC (25) NCP (19) SWP (2) BVA(1) Independent (1)

| Constituency No. | Constituency | Reserved for (SC/ST/None) | Candidate | Party | Poll On | Result |
|---|---|---|---|---|---|---|
| 1 | Nandurbar | SC | K. C. Padavi | Indian National Congress | 29 April 2019 | Lost |
| 2 | Dhule | None | Kunal Rohidas Patil | Indian National Congress | 29 April 2019 | Lost |
| 3 | Jalgaon | None | Gulabrao Deokar | Nationalist Congress Party | 23 April 2019 | Lost |
| 4 | Raver | None | Dr. Ulhas Patil | Indian National Congress | 23 April 2019 | Lost |
| 5 | Buldhana | None | Rajendra Shingane | Nationalist Congress Party | 18 April 2019 | Lost |
| 6 | Akola | None | Hidayat Patel | Indian National Congress | 18 April 2019 | Lost |
| 7 | Amravati | SC | Navaneet Kaur | Independent | 18 April 2019 | Won |
| 8 | Wardha | None | Charulata Tokas | Indian National Congress | 11 April 2019 | Lost |
| 9 | Ramtek | SC | Kishor Uttamrao Gajbhiye | Indian National Congress | 11 April 2019 | Lost |
| 10 | Nagpur | None | Nana Patole | Indian National Congress | 11 April 2019 | Lost |
| 11 | Bhandara–Gondia | None | Nana Panchbudhe | Nationalist Congress Party | 11 April 2019 | Lost |
| 12 | Gadchiroli–Chimur | ST | Namdev Usendi | Indian National Congress | 11 April 2019 | Lost |
| 13 | Chandrapur | None | Suresh Dhanorkar | Indian National Congress | 11 April 2019 | Won |
| 14 | Yavatmal–Washim | None | Manikrao Thakare | Indian National Congress | 11 April 2019 | Lost |
| 15 | Hingoli | None | Subhash Wankhede | Indian National Congress | 18 April 2019 | Lost |
| 16 | Nanded | None | Ashok Chavan | Indian National Congress | 18 April 2019 | Lost |
| 17 | Parbhani | None | Rajesh Vitekar | Nationalist Congress Party | 18 April 2019 | Lost |
| 18 | Jalna | None | Vilas Keshavrao Autade | Indian National Congress | 23 April 2019 | Lost |
| 19 | Aurangabad | None | Subhash Zambad | Indian National Congress | 23 April 2019 | Lost |
| 20 | Dindori | ST | Dhanraj Mahale | Nationalist Congress Party | 29 April 2019 | Lost |
| 21 | Nashik | None | Sameer Bhujbal | Nationalist Congress Party | 29 April 2019 | Lost |
| 22 | Palghar | ST | Baliram Sukur Jadhav | Bahujan Vikas Aaghadi | 29 April 2019 | Lost |
| 23 | Bhiwandi | None | Suresh Kashinath Taware | Indian National Congress | 29 April 2019 | Lost |
| 24 | Kalyan | None | Babaji Patil | Nationalist Congress Party | 29 April 2019 | Lost |
| 25 | Thane | None | Anand Paranjpe | Nationalist Congress Party | 29 April 2019 | Lost |
| 26 | Mumbai North | None | Urmila Matondkar | Indian National Congress | 29 April 2019 | Lost |
| 27 | Mumbai North West | None | Sanjay Nirupam | Indian National Congress | 29 April 2019 | Lost |
| 28 | Mumbai North East | None | Sanjay Dina Patil | Nationalist Congress Party | 29 April 2019 | Lost |
| 29 | Mumbai North Central | None | Priya Dutt | Indian National Congress | 29 April 2019 | Lost |
| 30 | Mumbai South Central | None | Eknath Gaikwad | Indian National Congress | 29 April 2019 | Lost |
| 31 | Mumbai South | None | Milind Murli Deora | Indian National Congress | 29 April 2019 | Lost |
| 32 | Raigad | None | Sunil Tatkare | Nationalist Congress Party | 23 April 2019 | Won |
| 33 | Maval | None | Parth Pawar | Nationalist Congress Party | 29 April 2019 | Lost |
| 34 | Pune | None | Mohan Joshi | Indian National Congress | 23 April 2019 | Lost |
| 35 | Baramati | None | Supriya Sule | Nationalist Congress Party | 23 April 2019 | Won |
| 36 | Shirur | None | Dr. Amol Kolhe | Nationalist Congress Party | 29 April 2019 | Won |
| 37 | Ahmednagar | None | Sangram Arun Jagtap | Nationalist Congress Party | 23 April 2019 | Lost |
| 38 | Shirdi | SC | Bhausaheb Kamble | Indian National Congress | 29 April 2019 | Lost |
| 39 | Beed | None | Bajrang Sonawale | Nationalist Congress Party | 18 April 2019 | Lost |
| 40 | Osmanabad | None | Ranajagjitsinha Patil | Nationalist Congress Party | 18 April 2019 | Lost |
| 41 | Latur | SC | Machhlindra Kamat | Indian National Congress | 18 April 2019 | Lost |
| 42 | Solapur | SC | Sushilkumar Shinde | Indian National Congress | 18 April 2019 | Lost |
| 43 | Madha | None | Sanjay Shinde | Nationalist Congress Party | 23 April 2019 | Lost |
| 44 | Sangli | None | Vishal Patil | Swabhimani Paksha | 23 April 2019 | Lost |
| 45 | Satara | None | Udayanraje Bhosale | Nationalist Congress Party | 23 April 2019 | Won |
| 46 | Ratnagiri–Sindhudurg | None | Navinchandra Bandivadekar | Indian National Congress | 23 April 2019 | Lost |
| 47 | Kolhapur | None | Dhananjay Mahadik | Nationalist Congress Party | 23 April 2019 | Lost |
| 48 | Hatkanangle | None | Raju Shetti | Swabhimani Paksha | 23 April 2019 | Lost |

== Manipur ==
INC (2)

| Constituency No. | Constituency | Reserved for (SC/ST/None) | Candidate | Party | Poll On | Result |
|---|---|---|---|---|---|---|
| 1 | Inner Manipur | None | O. Nabakishore Singh | Indian National Congress | 18 April 2019 | Lost |
| 2 | Outer Manipur | ST | K. James | Indian National Congress | 11 April 2019 | Lost |

== Meghalaya ==
INC (2)

| Constituency No. | Constituency | Reserved for (SC/ST/None) | Candidate | Party | Poll On | Result |
|---|---|---|---|---|---|---|
| 1 | Shillong | None | Vincent Pala | Indian National Congress | 11 April 2019 | Won |
| 2 | Tura | ST | Mukul Sangma | Indian National Congress | 11 April 2019 | Lost |

== Mizoram ==
Independent (1)

| Constituency No. | Constituency | Reserved for (SC/ST/None) | Candidate | Party | Poll On | Result |
|---|---|---|---|---|---|---|
| 1 | Mizoram | ST | Lalnghinglova Hmar | Independent | 11 April 2019 | Lost |

== Nagaland ==
INC (1)

| Constituency No. | Constituency | Reserved for (SC/ST/None) | Candidate | Party | Poll On | Result |
|---|---|---|---|---|---|---|
| 1 | Nagaland | None | K.L. Chishi | Indian National Congress | 11 April 2019 | Lost |

== Odisha ==
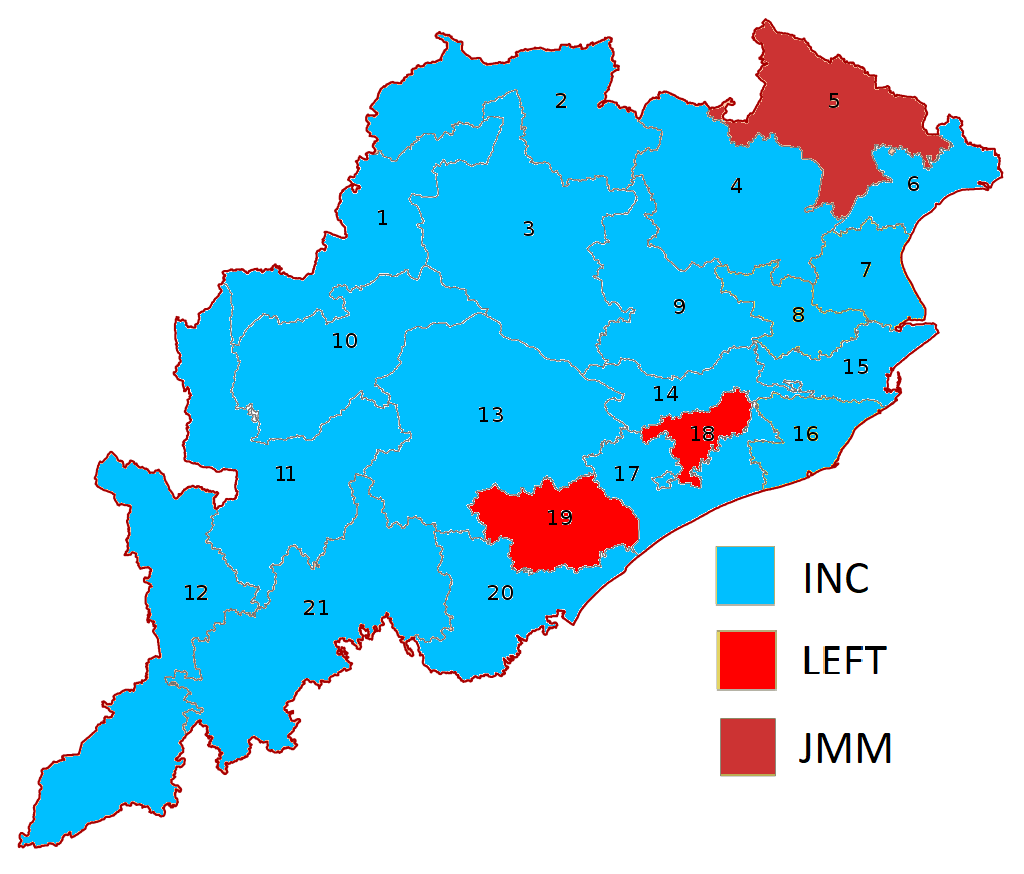
Odisha UPA

INC (18) CPI (1) CPI(M) (1) JMM (1)

| Constituency No. | Constituency | Reserved for (SC/ST/None) | Candidate | Party | Poll On | Result |
|---|---|---|---|---|---|---|
| 1 | Bargarh | None | Pradeep Kumar Devta | Indian National Congress | 18 April 2019 | Lost |
| 2 | Sundargarh | ST | George Tirkey | Indian National Congress | 18 April 2019 | Lost |
| 3 | Sambalpur | None | Sarat Patnaik | Indian National Congress | 29 April 2019 | Lost |
| 4 | Keonjhar | ST | Fakir Mohan Naik | Indian National Congress | 23 April 2019 | Lost |
| 5 | Mayurbhanj | ST | Anjali Soren | Jharkhand Mukti Morcha | 29 April 2019 | Lost |
| 6 | Balasore | None | Navajyoti Patnaik | Indian National Congress | 29 April 2019 | Lost |
| 7 | Bhadrak | SC | Madhumita Sethi | Indian National Congress | 29 April 2019 | Lost |
| 8 | Jajpur | SC | Manas Jena | Indian National Congress | 29 April 2019 | Lost |
| 9 | Dhenkanal | None | Kamakhya Prasad Singh Deo | Indian National Congress | 23 April 2019 | Lost |
| 10 | Bolangir | None | Samarendra Mishta | Indian National Congress | 18 April 2019 | Lost |
| 11 | Kalahandi | None | Bhakta Charan Das | Indian National Congress | 11 April 2019 | Lost |
| 12 | Nabarangpur | ST | Pradeep Majhi | Indian National Congress | 11 April 2019 | Lost |
| 13 | Kandhamal | None | Manoj Kumar Acharya | Indian National Congress | 18 April 2019 | Lost |
| 14 | Cuttack | None | Panchanan Kanungo | Indian National Congress | 23 April 2019 | Lost |
| 15 | Kendrapara | None | Dharanidhar Nayak | Indian National Congress | 29 April 2019 | Lost |
| 16 | Jagatsinghpur | SC | Pratima Mallick | Indian National Congress | 29 April 2019 | Lost |
| 17 | Puri | None | Satya Prakash Nayak | Indian National Congress | 23 April 2019 | Lost |
| 18 | Bhubaneswar | None | Janardana Patil | Communist Party of India (Marxist) | 23 April 2019 | Lost |
| 19 | Aska | None | Rama Krushna Panda | Communist Party of India | 18 April 2019 | Lost |
| 20 | Berhampur | None | V. Chandrasekhar Naidu | Indian National Congress | 11 April 2019 | Lost |
| 21 | Koraput | ST | Saptagiri Sankar Ulaka | Indian National Congress | 11 April 2019 | Won |

== Punjab ==
INC (13)

| Constituency No. | Constituency | Reserved for (SC/ST/None) | Candidate | Party | Poll On | Result |
|---|---|---|---|---|---|---|
| 1 | Gurdaspur | None | Sunil Jakhar | Indian National Congress | 19 May 2019 | Lost |
| 2 | Amritsar | None | Gurjeet Singh Aujla | Indian National Congress | 19 May 2019 | Won |
| 3 | Khadoor Sahib | None | Jasbir Singh Gill | Indian National Congress | 19 May 2019 | Won |
| 4 | Jalandhar | SC | Santokh Singh Chaudhary | Indian National Congress | 19 May 2019 | Won |
| 5 | Hoshiarpur | SC | Rajkumar Chabbewal | Indian National Congress | 19 May 2019 | Lost |
| 6 | Anandpur Sahib | None | Manish Tiwari | Indian National Congress | 19 May 2019 | Won |
| 7 | Ludhiana | None | Ravneet Singh Bittu | Indian National Congress | 19 May 2019 | Won |
| 8 | Fatehgarh Sahib | SC | Dr. Amar Singh | Indian National Congress | 19 May 2019 | Won |
| 9 | Faridkot | SC | Mohammad Sadique | Indian National Congress | 19 May 2019 | Won |
| 10 | Firozpur | None | Sher Singh Ghubaya | Indian National Congress | 19 May 2019 | Lost |
| 11 | Bathinda | None | Amrinder Singh Raja Warring | Indian National Congress | 19 May 2019 | Lost |
| 12 | Sangrur | None | Kewal Singh Dhillon | Indian National Congress | 19 May 2019 | Lost |
| 13 | Patiala | None | Preneet Kaur | Indian National Congress | 19 May 2019 | Won |

== Rajasthan ==
INC (25)

| Constituency No. | Constituency | Reserved for (SC/ST/None) | Candidate | Party | Poll On | Result |
|---|---|---|---|---|---|---|
| 1 | Ganganagar | SC | Bharat Ram Meghwal | Indian National Congress | 6 May 2019 | Lost |
| 2 | Bikaner | SC | Madangopal Meghwal | Indian National Congress | 6 May 2019 | Lost |
| 3 | Churu | None | Rafique Mandelia | Indian National Congress | 6 May 2019 | Lost |
| 4 | Jhunjhunu | None | Shrawan Kumar | Indian National Congress | 6 May 2019 | Lost |
| 5 | Sikar | None | Subhash Maharia | Indian National Congress | 6 May 2019 | Lost |
| 6 | Jaipur Rural | None | Krishna Poonia | Indian National Congress | 6 May 2019 | Lost |
| 7 | Jaipur | None | Jyoti Khandelwal | Indian National Congress | 6 May 2019 | Lost |
| 8 | Alwar | None | Jitendra Singh | Indian National Congress | 6 May 2019 | Lost |
| 9 | Bharatpur | SC | Abhijit Kumar Jatav | Indian National Congress | 6 May 2019 | Lost |
| 10 | Karauli–Dholpur | SC | Sanjay Kumar Jatav | Indian National Congress | 6 May 2019 | Lost |
| 11 | Dausa | ST | Savita Meena | Indian National Congress | 6 May 2019 | Lost |
| 12 | Tonk–Sawai Madhopur | None | Namo Narain Meena | Indian National Congress | 29 April 2019 | Lost |
| 13 | Ajmer | None | Rijju Jhunjhunuwala | Indian National Congress | 29 April 2019 | Lost |
| 14 | Nagaur | None | Dr. Jyoti Mirdha | Indian National Congress | 6 May 2019 | Lost |
| 15 | Pali | None | Badri Ram Jakhar | Indian National Congress | 29 April 2019 | Lost |
| 16 | Jodhpur | None | Vaibhav Gehlot | Indian National Congress | 29 April 2019 | Lost |
| 17 | Barmer | None | Manvendra Singh | Indian National Congress | 29 April 2019 | Lost |
| 18 | Jalore | None | Ratan Dewasi | Indian National Congress | 29 April 2019 | Lost |
| 19 | Udaipur | ST | Raghuveer Meena | Indian National Congress | 29 April 2019 | Lost |
| 20 | Banswara | ST | Tarachand Bhagora | Indian National Congress | 29 April 2019 | Lost |
| 21 | Chittorgarh | None | Gopal Singh Idwa | Indian National Congress | 29 April 2019 | Lost |
| 22 | Rajsamand | None | Devkinandan Gurjar | Indian National Congress | 29 April 2019 | Lost |
| 23 | Bhilwara | None | Rampal Sharma | Indian National Congress | 29 April 2019 | Lost |
| 24 | Kota | None | Ramnarayan Meena | Indian National Congress | 29 April 2019 | Lost |
| 25 | Jhalawar–Baran | None | Pramod Sharma | Indian National Congress | 29 April 2019 | Lost |

== Sikkim ==
INC (1)

| Constituency No. | Constituency | Reserved for (SC/ST/None) | Candidate | Party | Poll On | Result |
|---|---|---|---|---|---|---|
| 1 | Sikkim | None | Bharat Basnett | Indian National Congress | 11 April 2019 | Lost |

== Tamil Nadu ==
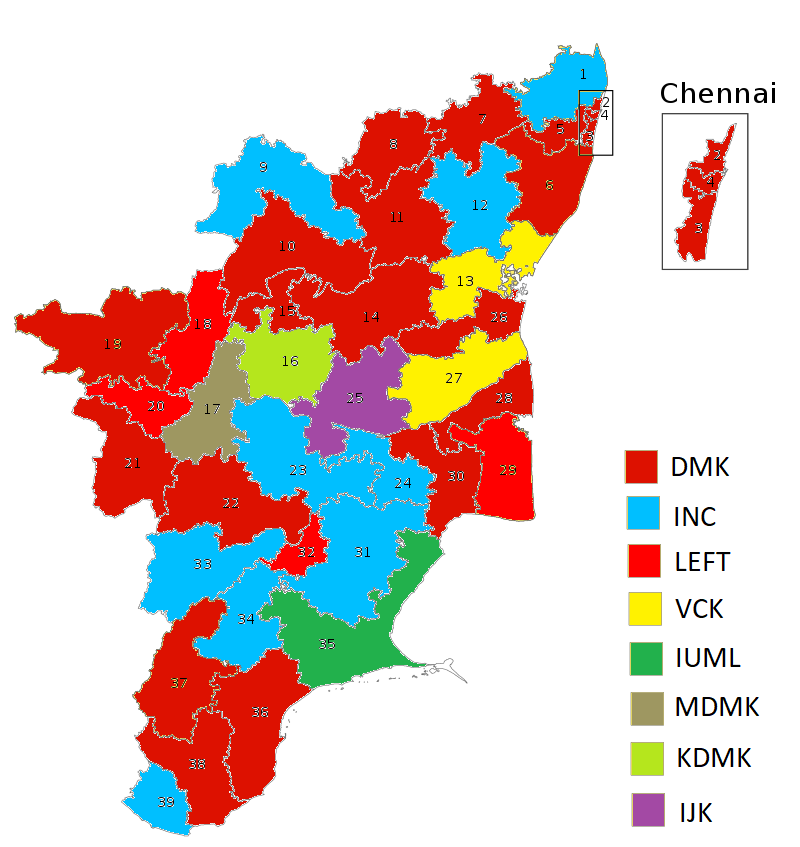
Tamil Nadu UPA

DMK (20) INC (9) CPI (2) CPI(M) (2) VCK (2) IUML (1) MDMK (1) KMDK (1) IJK (1)

| Constituency No. | Constituency | Reserved for (SC/ST/None) | Candidate | Party | Poll On | Result |
|---|---|---|---|---|---|---|
| 1 | Thiruvallur | SC | Dr. K Jayakumar | Indian National Congress | 18 April 2019 | Won |
| 2 | Chennai North | None | Kalanidhi Veerasamy | Dravida Munnetra Kazhagam | 18 April 2019 | Won |
| 3 | Chennai South | None | Tamilachi Thangapandian | Dravida Munnetra Kazhagam | 18 April 2019 | Won |
| 4 | Chennai Central | None | Dayanidhi Maran | Dravida Munnetra Kazhagam | 18 April 2019 | Won |
| 5 | Sriperumbudur | None | T. R. Baalu | Dravida Munnetra Kazhagam | 18 April 2019 | Won |
| 6 | Kancheepuram | SC | G Selvam | Dravida Munnetra Kazhagam | 18 April 2019 | Won |
| 7 | Arakkonam | None | S. Jagathrakshakan | Dravida Munnetra Kazhagam | 18 April 2019 | Won |
| 8 | Vellore | None | Kathir Anand | Dravida Munnetra Kazhagam | 9 August 2019 | Won |
| 9 | Krishnagiri | None | Dr. A. Chellakumar | Indian National Congress | 18 April 2019 | Won |
| 10 | Dharmapuri | None | Dr S Senthil Kumar | Dravida Munnetra Kazhagam | 18 April 2019 | Won |
| 11 | Tiruvannamalai | None | C N Annadurai | Dravida Munnetra Kazhagam | 18 April 2019 | Won |
| 12 | Arani | None | Dr. M. K. Vishnu Prasad | Indian National Congress | 18 April 2019 | Won |
| 13 | Villupuram | SC | D. Ravikumar | Viduthalai Chiruthaigal Katchi | 18 April 2019 | Won |
| 14 | Kallakurichi | None | Gautam Sigamani | Dravida Munnetra Kazhagam | 18 April 2019 | Won |
| 15 | Salem | None | S R Parthiban | Dravida Munnetra Kazhagam | 18 April 2019 | Won |
| 16 | Namakkal | None | Chinnraj | Kongunadu Makkal Desia Katchi | 18 April 2019 | Won |
| 17 | Erode | None | A. Ganesha Murthi | Marumalarchi Dravida Munnetra Kazhagam | 18 April 2019 | Won |
| 18 | Tiruppur | None | K. Subbarayan | Communist Party of India | 18 April 2019 | Won |
| 19 | Nilgiris | SC | A Raja | Dravida Munnetra Kazhagam | 18 April 2019 | Won |
| 20 | Coimbatore | None | P.R. Natarajan | Communist Party of India (Marxist) | 18 April 2019 | Won |
| 21 | Pollachi | None | K. Shamugasundaram | Dravida Munnetra Kazhagam | 18 April 2019 | Won |
| 22 | Dindigul | None | P. Velusamy | Dravida Munnetra Kazhagam | 18 April 2019 | Won |
| 23 | Karur | None | Jothimani | Indian National Congress | 18 April 2019 | Won |
| 24 | Tiruchirappalli | None | Su. Thirunavukkarasar | Indian National Congress | 18 April 2019 | Won |
| 25 | Perambalur | None | T.R. Pachamuthu(Parivendhar) | Indhiya Jananayaga Katchi | 18 April 2019 | Won |
| 26 | Cuddalore | None | Ramesh | Dravida Munnetra Kazhagam | 18 April 2019 | Won |
| 27 | Chidambaram | SC | Thol. Thirumavalavan | Viduthalai Chiruthaigal Katchi | 18 April 2019 | Won |
| 28 | Mayiladuthurai | None | Ramalingam | Dravida Munnetra Kazhagam | 18 April 2019 | Won |
| 29 | Nagapattinam | SC | Selvaraj | Communist Party of India | 18 April 2019 | Won |
| 30 | Thanjavur | None | S. S. Palanimanickam | Dravida Munnetra Kazhagam | 18 April 2019 | Won |
| 31 | Sivaganga | None | Karti Chidambaram | Indian National Congress | 18 April 2019 | Won |
| 32 | Madurai | None | S. Venkatesan | Communist Party of India (Marxist) | 18 April 2019 | Won |
| 33 | Theni | None | EVKS Elangovan | Indian National Congress | 18 April 2019 | Lost |
| 34 | Virudhunagar | None | Manicka Tagore | Indian National Congress | 18 April 2019 | Won |
| 35 | Ramanathapuram | None | K. Navaskani | Indian Union Muslim League | 18 April 2019 | Won |
| 36 | Thoothukudi | None | Kanimozhi | Dravida Munnetra Kazhagam | 18 April 2019 | Won |
| 37 | Tenkasi | SC | Dhanush M. Kumar | Dravida Munnetra Kazhagam | 18 April 2019 | Won |
| 38 | Tirunelveli | None | S. Gnanathiraviam | Dravida Munnetra Kazhagam | 18 April 2019 | Won |
| 39 | Kanyakumari | None | H. Vasanthakumar | Indian National Congress | 18 April 2019 | Won |

== Telangana ==
INC (17)

| Constituency No. | Constituency | Reserved for (SC/ST/None) | Candidate | Party | Poll On | Result |
|---|---|---|---|---|---|---|
| 1 | Adilabad | ST | Ramesh Rathod | Indian National Congress | 11 April 2019 | Lost |
| 2 | Peddapalli | SC | A Chandrashekhar | Indian National Congress | 11 April 2019 | Lost |
| 3 | Karimnagar | None | Ponnam Prabhakar Goud | Indian National Congress | 11 April 2019 | Lost |
| 4 | Nizamabad | None | Madhu Goud Yaskhi | Indian National Congress | 11 April 2019 | Lost |
| 5 | Zahirabad | None | K Madan Mohan Rao | Indian National Congress | 11 April 2019 | Lost |
| 6 | Medak | None | Gali Anil Kumar | Indian National Congress | 11 April 2019 | Lost |
| 7 | Malkajgiri | None | Revanth Reddy | Indian National Congress | 11 April 2019 | Won |
| 8 | Secunderabad | None | Anjan Kumar Yadav | Indian National Congress | 11 April 2019 | Lost |
| 9 | Hyderabad | None | Firoz Khan | Indian National Congress | 11 April 2019 | Lost |
| 10 | Chevella | None | Konda Vishweshwar Reddy | Indian National Congress | 11 April 2019 | Lost |
| 11 | Mahbubnagar | None | Vamshichand Reddy | Indian National Congress | 11 April 2019 | Lost |
| 12 | Nagarkurnool | SC | Mallu Ravi | Indian National Congress | 11 April 2019 | Lost |
| 13 | Nalgonda | None | Nalamada Uttam Kumar Reddy | Indian National Congress | 11 April 2019 | Won |
| 14 | Bhongir | None | Komatireddy Venkat Reddy | Indian National Congress | 11 April 2019 | Won |
| 15 | Warangal | SC | Dommati Sambaiah | Indian National Congress | 11 April 2019 | Lost |
| 16 | Mahabubabad | ST | Balram Naik | Indian National Congress | 11 April 2019 | Lost |
| 17 | Khammam | None | Renuka Chowdhary | Indian National Congress | 11 April 2019 | Lost |

== Tripura ==
INC (2)

| Constituency No. | Constituency | Reserved for (SC/ST/None) | Candidate | Party | Poll On | Result |
|---|---|---|---|---|---|---|
| 1 | Tripura West | None | Subal Bhowmick | Indian National Congress | 11 April 2019 | Lost |
| 2 | Tripura East | ST | Pragya Deb Burman | Indian National Congress | 23 April 2019 | Lost |

== Uttar Pradesh ==
INC (67) JAP (3) Independent (1)

| Constituency No. | Constituency | Reserved for (SC/ST/None) | Candidate | Party | Poll On | Result |
|---|---|---|---|---|---|---|
| 1 | Saharanpur | None | Imran Masood | Indian National Congress | 11 April 2019 | Lost |
| 2 | Kairana | None | Harendra Singh Malik | Indian National Congress | 11 April 2019 | Lost |
| 3 | Muzaffarnagar | None | DNF | | 11 April 2019 | DNF |
| 4 | Bijnor | None | Nasimuddin Siddiqui | Indian National Congress | 11 April 2019 | Lost |
| 5 | Nagina | SC | Omvati Devi Jatav | Indian National Congress | 18 April 2019 | Lost |
| 6 | Moradabad | None | Imran Pratapgarhi | Indian National Congress | 23 April 2019 | Lost |
| 7 | Rampur | None | Sanjay Kapoor | Indian National Congress | 23 April 2019 | Lost |
| 8 | Sambhal | None | J P Singh | Indian National Congress | 23 April 2019 | Lost |
| 9 | Amroha | None | Sachin Choudhary | Indian National Congress | 18 April 2019 | Lost |
| 10 | Meerut | None | Harendra Agarwal | Indian National Congress | 11 April 2019 | Lost |
| 11 | Baghpat | None | DNF | | 11 April 2019 | DNF |
| 12 | Ghaziabad | None | Dolly Sharma | Indian National Congress | 11 April 2019 | Lost |
| 13 | Gautam Buddh Nagar | None | Dr. Arvind Singh Chauhan | Indian National Congress | 11 April 2019 | Lost |
| 14 | Bulandshahr | SC | Bansi Lal Pahadia | Indian National Congress | 18 April 2019 | Lost |
| 15 | Aligarh | None | Choudhary Brijender Singh | Indian National Congress | 18 April 2019 | Lost |
| 16 | Hathras | SC | Trilokiram Diwakar | Indian National Congress | 18 April 2019 | Lost |
| 17 | Mathura | None | Mahesh Pathak | Indian National Congress | 18 April 2019 | Lost |
| 18 | Agra | SC | Preeta Harit | Indian National Congress | 18 April 2019 | Lost |
| 19 | Fatehpur Sikri | None | Raj Babbar | Indian National Congress | 18 April 2019 | Lost |
| 20 | Firozabad | None | DNF | | 23 April 2019 | DNF |
| 21 | Mainpuri | None | DNF | | 23 April 2019 | DNF |
| 22 | Etah | None | Suraj Singh Shakya | Jan Adhikar Party | 23 April 2019 | Lost |
| 23 | Badaun | None | Saleem Iqbal Shervani | Indian National Congress | 23 April 2019 | Lost |
| 24 | Aonla | None | Kunwar Sarvaraj Singh | Indian National Congress | 23 April 2019 | Lost |
| 25 | Bareilly | None | Praveen Aron | Indian National Congress | 23 April 2019 | Lost |
| 26 | Pilibhit | None | Surendra Kumar Gupta | Independent | 23 April 2019 | Lost |
| 27 | Shahjahanpur | SC | Brahm Swaroop Sagar | Indian National Congress | 29 April 2019 | Lost |
| 28 | Kheri | None | Zafar Ali Naqvi | Indian National Congress | 29 April 2019 | Lost |
| 29 | Dhaurahra | None | Jitin Prasad | Indian National Congress | 6 May 2019 | Lost |
| 30 | Sitapur | None | Kaisar Jahan | Indian National Congress | 6 May 2019 | Lost |
| 31 | Hardoi | SC | Virendra Kumar Verma | Indian National Congress | 29 April 2019 | Lost |
| 32 | Misrikh | SC | Manjari Rahi | Indian National Congress | 29 April 2019 | Lost |
| 33 | Unnao | None | Annu Tandon | Indian National Congress | 29 April 2019 | Lost |
| 34 | Mohanlalganj | SC | R. K. Chaudhary | Indian National Congress | 6 May 2019 | Lost |
| 35 | Lucknow | None | Acharya Pramod Krishnam | Indian National Congress | 6 May 2019 | Lost |
| 36 | Rae Bareli | None | Sonia Gandhi | Indian National Congress | 6 May 2019 | Won |
| 37 | Amethi | None | Rahul Gandhi | Indian National Congress | 6 May 2019 | Lost |
| 38 | Sultanpur | None | Sanjay Singh | Indian National Congress | 12 May 2019 | Lost |
| 39 | Pratapgarh | None | Ratna Singh | Indian National Congress | 12 May 2019 | Lost |
| 40 | Farrukhabad | None | Salman Khurshid | Indian National Congress | 29 April 2019 | Lost |
| 41 | Etawah | SC | Ashok Kumar Doharey | Indian National Congress | 29 April 2019 | Lost |
| 42 | Kannauj | None | DNF | | 29 April 2019 | DNF |
| 43 | Kanpur Urban | None | Sriprakash Jaiswal | Indian National Congress | 29 April 2019 | Lost |
| 44 | Akbarpur | None | Raja Ram Pal | Indian National Congress | 29 April 2019 | Lost |
| 45 | Jalaun | SC | Brij Lal Khabri | Indian National Congress | 29 April 2019 | Lost |
| 46 | Jhansi | None | Shiv Sharan Singh | Indian National Congress | 29 April 2019 | Lost |
| 47 | Hamirpur | None | Pritam Lodhi | Indian National Congress | 29 April 2019 | Lost |
| 48 | Banda | None | Bal Kunwar Patel | Indian National Congress | 6 May 2019 | Lost |
| 49 | Fatehpur | None | Rakesh Sachan | Indian National Congress | 6 May 2019 | Lost |
| 50 | Kaushambi | SC | Girish Chand Pasi | Indian National Congress | 6 May 2019 | Lost |
| 51 | Phulpur | None | Pankaj Niranjan | Indian National Congress | 12 May 2019 | Lost |
| 52 | Allahabad | None | Yogesh Shukla | Indian National Congress | 12 May 2019 | Lost |
| 53 | Barabanki | SC | Tanuj Punia | Indian National Congress | 6 May 2019 | Lost |
| 54 | Faizabad | None | Nirmal Khatri | Indian National Congress | 6 May 2019 | Lost |
| 55 | Ambedkar Nagar | None | DNF | | 12 May 2019 | DNF |
| 56 | Bahraich | SC | Savitri Bai Phule | Indian National Congress | 6 May 2019 | Lost |
| 57 | Kaiserganj | None | Vinay Kumar Pandey | Indian National Congress | 6 May 2019 | Lost |
| 58 | Shrawasti | None | Dhirender Pratap Singh | Indian National Congress | 12 May 2019 | Lost |
| 59 | Gonda | None | Krishna Patel | Indian National Congress | 6 May 2019 | Lost |
| 60 | Domariyaganj | None | Chandresh Upadhyay | Indian National Congress | 12 May 2019 | Lost |
| 61 | Basti | None | Raj Kishore Singh | Indian National Congress | 12 May 2019 | Lost |
| 62 | Sant Kabir Nagar | None | Bhalchandra Yadav | Indian National Congress | 12 May 2019 | Lost |
| 63 | Maharajganj | None | Supriya Shrinate | Indian National Congress | 19 May 2019 | Lost |
| 64 | Gorakhpur | None | Madhusudan Tiwari | Indian National Congress | 19 May 2019 | Lost |
| 65 | Kushi Nagar | None | R. P. N. Singh | Indian National Congress | 19 May 2019 | Lost |
| 66 | Deoria | None | Niaz Ahmed | Indian National Congress | 19 May 2019 | Lost |
| 67 | Bansgaon | SC | DNF | | 19 May 2019 | DNF |
| 68 | Lalganj | SC | Pankaj Mohan Sonkar | Indian National Congress | 12 May 2019 | Lost |
| 69 | Azamgarh | None | DNF | | 12 May 2019 | DNF |
| 70 | Ghosi | None | Bal Krishna Chauhan | Indian National Congress | 19 May 2019 | Lost |
| 71 | Salempur | None | Rajesh Mishra | Indian National Congress | 19 May 2019 | Lost |
| 72 | Ballia | None | DNF | | 19 May 2019 | DNF |
| 73 | Jaunpur | None | Devvrata Mishra | Indian National Congress | 19 May 2019 | Lost |
| 74 | Machhlishahr | SC | Dr. Amarnath Paswan | Jan Adhikar Party | 12 May 2019 | Lost |
| 75 | Ghazipur | None | Ajit Prasad Kushwaha | Indian National Congress | 19 May 2019 | Lost |
| 76 | Chandauli | None | Shivkanya Kushwaha | Jan Adhikar Party | 19 May 2019 | Lost |
| 77 | Varanasi | None | Ajay Rai | Indian National Congress | 19 May 2019 | Lost |
| 78 | Bhadohi | None | Ramakant Yadav | Indian National Congress | 12 May 2019 | Lost |
| 79 | Mirzapur | None | Lalitesh Pati Tripathi | Indian National Congress | 19 May 2019 | Lost |
| 80 | Robertsganj | SC | Bhagwati Prasad Choudhary | Indian National Congress | 19 May 2019 | Lost |

== Uttarakhand ==
INC (5)

| Constituency No. | Constituency | Reserved for (SC/ST/None) | Candidate | Party | Poll On | Result |
|---|---|---|---|---|---|---|
| 1 | Tehri Garhwal | None | Pritam Singh | Indian National Congress | 11 April 2019 | Lost |
| 2 | Garhwal | None | Manish Khanduri | Indian National Congress | 11 April 2019 | Lost |
| 3 | Almora | SC | Pradeep Tamta | Indian National Congress | 11 April 2019 | Lost |
| 4 | Nainital–Udhamsingh Nagar | None | Harish Rawat | Indian National Congress | 11 April 2019 | Lost |
| 5 | Haridwar | None | Ambrish Kumar | Indian National Congress | 11 April 2019 | Lost |

== West Bengal ==
INC (40)

| Constituency No. | Constituency | Reserved for (SC/ST/None) | Candidate | Party | Poll On | Result |
|---|---|---|---|---|---|---|
| 1 | Cooch Behar | SC | Priya Roy Choudhury | Indian National Congress | 11 April 2019 | Lost |
| 2 | Alipurduars | ST | Mohan Lal Basumuta | Indian National Congress | 11 April 2019 | Lost |
| 3 | Jalpaiguri | SC | Mani Kumar Darnal | Indian National Congress | 18 April 2019 | Lost |
| 4 | Darjeeling | None | Shankar Malakar | Indian National Congress | 18 April 2019 | Lost |
| 5 | Raiganj | None | Deepa Dasmunshi | Indian National Congress | 18 April 2019 | Lost |
| 6 | Balurghat | None | Sadik Sarkar | Indian National Congress | 23 April 2019 | Lost |
| 7 | Maldaha Uttar | None | Isha Khan Chowdhury | Indian National Congress | 23 April 2019 | Lost |
| 8 | Maldaha Dakshin | None | Abu Hasem Khan Choudhury | Indian National Congress | 23 April 2019 | Won |
| 9 | Jangipur | None | Abhijit Mukherjee | Indian National Congress | 23 April 2019 | Lost |
| 10 | Baharampur | None | Adhir Ranjan Chowdhury | Indian National Congress | 29 April 2019 | Won |
| 11 | Murshidabad | None | Abu Hena | Indian National Congress | 23 April 2019 | Lost |
| 12 | Krishnanagar | None | Intaj Ali Shah | Indian National Congress | 29 April 2019 | Lost |
| 13 | Ranaghat | SC | Minati Biswas | Indian National Congress | 29 April 2019 | Lost |
| 14 | Bangaon | SC | Sourav Prasad | Indian National Congress | 6 May 2019 | Lost |
| 15 | Barrackpur | None | Mohammad Alam | Indian National Congress | 6 May 2019 | Lost |
| 16 | Dum Dum | None | Saurav Saha | Indian National Congress | 19 May 2019 | Lost |
| 17 | Barasat | None | Subrota (Rashu) Dutta | Indian National Congress | 19 May 2019 | Lost |
| 18 | Basirhat | None | Abdur Rahim Quazi | Indian National Congress | 19 May 2019 | Lost |
| 19 | Jaynagar | SC | Tapan Mondal | Indian National Congress | 19 May 2019 | Lost |
| 20 | Mathurapur | SC | Krittibas Sardar | Indian National Congress | 19 May 2019 | Lost |
| 21 | Diamond Harbour | None | Soumya Aich Roy | Indian National Congress | 19 May 2019 | Lost |
| 22 | Jadavpur | None | DNF | | 19 May 2019 | DNF |
| 23 | Kolkata Dakshin | None | Mita Chakraborty | Indian National Congress | 19 May 2019 | Lost |
| 24 | Kolkata Uttar | None | Syed Shahid Imam | Indian National Congress | 19 May 2019 | Lost |
| 25 | Howrah | None | Suvra Ghosh | Indian National Congress | 6 May 2019 | Lost |
| 26 | Uluberia | None | Shoma Ranisree Roy | Indian National Congress | 6 May 2019 | Lost |
| 27 | Sreerampur | None | Debabrata Biswas | Indian National Congress | 6 May 2019 | Lost |
| 28 | Hooghly | None | Pratul Saha | Indian National Congress | 6 May 2019 | Lost |
| 29 | Arambag | SC | Jyoti Das | Indian National Congress | 6 May 2019 | Lost |
| 30 | Tamluk | None | Lakshman Chandra Seth | Indian National Congress | 12 May 2019 | Lost |
| 31 | Kanthi | None | Dipak Kumar Das | Indian National Congress | 12 May 2019 | Lost |
| 32 | Ghatal | None | Khandakar Mohammad Saifullah | Indian National Congress | 12 May 2019 | Lost |
| 33 | Jhargram | ST | Jagyeswar Hembram | Indian National Congress | 12 May 2019 | Lost |
| 34 | Medinipur | None | Sambhunath Chatterjee | Indian National Congress | 12 May 2019 | Lost |
| 35 | Purulia | None | Nepal Mahato | Indian National Congress | 12 May 2019 | Lost |
| 36 | Bankura | None | DNF | | 12 May 2019 | DNF |
| 37 | Bishnupur | SC | Narayan Chandra Khan | Indian National Congress | 12 May 2019 | Lost |
| 38 | Bardhaman Purba | SC | Siddhartha Majumder | Indian National Congress | 29 April 2019 | Lost |
| 39 | Bardhaman-Durgapur | None | Ranajit Mukherjee | Indian National Congress | 29 April 2019 | Lost |
| 40 | Asansol | None | Biswarup Mondal | Indian National Congress | 29 April 2019 | Lost |
| 41 | Bolpur | SC | Abhijit Saha | Indian National Congress | 29 April 2019 | Lost |
| 42 | Birbhum | None | Imam Hossain | Indian National Congress | 29 April 2019 | Lost |

== Andaman and Nicobar Islands (1) ==
INC (1)

| Constituency No. | Constituency | Reserved for (SC/ST/None) | Candidate | Party | Poll On | Result |
|---|---|---|---|---|---|---|
| 1 | Andaman and Nicobar Islands | None | Kuldeep Rai Sharma | Indian National Congress | 11 April 2019 | Won |

== Chandigarh (1) ==
INC (1)

| Constituency No. | Constituency | Reserved for (SC/ST/None) | Candidate | Party | Poll On | Result |
|---|---|---|---|---|---|---|
| 1 | Chandigarh | None | Pawan Kumar Bansal | Indian National Congress | 19 May 2019 | Lost |

== Dadra and Nagar Haveli (1) ==
INC (1)

| Constituency No. | Constituency | Reserved for (SC/ST/None) | Candidate | Party | Poll On | Result |
|---|---|---|---|---|---|---|
| 1 | Dadra and Nagar Haveli | ST | Prabhu Ratnabhai Tokiya | Indian National Congress | 23 April 2019 | Lost |

== Daman and Diu (1) ==
INC (1)

| Constituency No. | Constituency | Reserved for (SC/ST/None) | Candidate | Party | Poll On | Result |
|---|---|---|---|---|---|---|
| 1 | Daman and Diu | None | Ketan Patel | Indian National Congress | 23 April 2019 | Lost |

== Lakshadweep (1) ==
NCP (1)

Note: UPA member Nationalist Congress Party won, although there was no pre-poll alliance.

| Constituency No. | Constituency | Reserved for (SC/ST/None) | Candidate | Party | Poll On | Result |
|---|---|---|---|---|---|---|
| 1 | Lakshadweep | ST | Muhammed Hamdulla Sayeed | Nationalist Congress Party | 11 April 2019 | Lost |

== NCT of Delhi (7) ==
INC (7)

| Constituency No. | Constituency | Reserved for (SC/ST/None) | Candidate | Party | Poll On | Result |
|---|---|---|---|---|---|---|
| 1 | Chandni Chowk | None | Jai Parkash Aggarwal | Indian National Congress | 12 May 2019 | Lost |
| 2 | North East Delhi | None | Sheila Dikshit | Indian National Congress | 12 May 2019 | Lost |
| 3 | East Delhi | None | Arvinder Singh Lovely | Indian National Congress | 12 May 2019 | Lost |
| 4 | New Delhi | None | Ajay Maken | Indian National Congress | 12 May 2019 | Lost |
| 5 | North West Delhi | SC | Rajesh Lilothia | Indian National Congress | 12 May 2019 | Lost |
| 6 | West Delhi | None | Mahabal Mishra | Indian National Congress | 12 May 2019 | Lost |
| 7 | South Delhi | None | Vijender Singh | Indian National Congress | 12 May 2019 | Lost |

== Puducherry (1) ==
INC (1)

| Constituency No. | Constituency | Reserved for (SC/ST/None) | Candidate | Party | Poll On | Result |
|---|---|---|---|---|---|---|
| 1 | Puducherry | None | V. Vaithilingam | Indian National Congress | 18 April 2019 | Won |

== See also ==
List of United Progressive Alliance candidates in the 2009 Indian general election
List of United Progressive Alliance candidates in the 2014 Indian general election
List of United Progressive Alliance candidates in the 2019 Indian general election

- List of National Democratic Alliance candidates in the 2019 Indian general election
- List of Left Front candidates in the 2019 Indian general election
- Indian National Congress campaign for the 2019 Indian general election

| Preceded by 2014 | Lok Sabha; 2019 | Succeeded by 2024 |
