= Sitapur (disambiguation) =

Sitapur may refer to:

Towns in India

- Sitapur, Uttar Pradesh
  - Sitapur, Uttar Pradesh Assembly constituency
  - Sitapur Lok Sabha constituency
- Sitapur, Chhattisgarh
  - Sitapur, Chhattisgarh Assembly constituency

Villages in Nepal

- Sitapur, Arghakhanchi
- Sitapur, Banke
- Sitapur, Sagarmatha

== See also ==
- Sitapur Assembly constituency (disambiguation)
