= Sitapur Assembly constituency =

Sitapur Assembly constituency may refer to these electoral constituencies in India:

- Sitapur, Chhattisgarh Assembly constituency
- Sitapur, Uttar Pradesh Assembly constituency

== See also ==
- Sitapur (disambiguation)
- Sitapur Lok Sabha constituency, Uttar Pradesh, in the lower house of the parliament of India
