= Radhey Shyam Jaisawal =

Indian politician from Uttar Pradesh

- राधे श्याम जयसवाल

Member of the Uttar Pradesh Legislative Assembly
- In office October 1996 – March 2017
- Preceded by: Rajendra Kumar Gupta
- Succeeded by: Rakesh Rathore
- Constituency: Sitapur

Personal details
- Born: 17 July 1952 (age 74) Sitapur district, Uttar Pradesh, India
- Party: Samajwadi Party
- Children: 2 sons, 2 daughters
- Education: Raja Raghuver Dayal Inter College

Radhey Shyam Jaisawal (Hindi: राधे श्याम जायसवाल) is an Indian politician and a former member of the 16th Legislative Assembly of Uttar Pradesh. He represented the Sitapur constituency from October 1996 to March 2017 and is a member of the Samajwadi Party.

== Early life and education ==
Jaisawal was born in Sitapur district. He attended Raja Raghuver Dayal Inter College and studied up to the eighth grade.

== Political career ==
Jaisawal has been an MLA for four terms. He represented the Sitapur constituency as a member of the Samajwadi Party.

== Posts held ==
#	From	To	Position	Comments
01	2012	2017	Member, 16th Legislative Assembly of Uttar Pradesh	
02	2007	2012	Member, 15th Legislative Assembly of Uttar Pradesh	
03	2002	2007	Member, 14th Legislative Assembly of Uttar Pradesh	
04	1996	2002	Member, 13th Legislative Assembly of Uttar Pradesh	

== See also ==
- Sitapur Assembly constituency
- Sixteenth Legislative Assembly of Uttar Pradesh
- Uttar Pradesh Legislative Assembly
