= Avinash Trivedi =

Indian politician

Member of 17th Uttar Pradesh Assembly
- In office 2017–2022
- Preceded by: Gomti Yadav
- Succeeded by: Yogesh Shukla
- Constituency: Bakshi Kaa Talab

Personal details
- Party: Bharatiya Janata Party
- Occupation: MLA
- Profession: Politician

Avinash Trivedi is an Indian politician and a member of 17th Legislative Assembly, Uttar Pradesh of India. He represents the ‘Bakshi Ka Talab’ constituency in Lucknow district of Uttar Pradesh.

== Political career ==
Avinash Trivedi contested Uttar Pradesh Assembly Election as Bhartiya Janata Party candidate and defeated his close contestant Nakul Dubey from Bahujan Samaj Party with a margin of 17,584 votes.

== Posts held ==
#	From	To	Position	Comments
01	2017	2022	Member, 17th Legislative Assembly	
