= Asha Maurya =

Indian politician

Member of Uttar Pradesh Legislative Assembly
- Incumbent
- Assumed office 2022
- Preceded by: Narendra Singh Verma
- Constituency: Mahmoodabad

Personal details
- Party: Bharatiya Janata Party

Asha Maurya is an Indian politician. She was elected to Mahmoodabad in the 2022 Uttar Pradesh Legislative Assembly election as a member of the Bharatiya Janata Party.

== Political career ==
Maurya became the first woman Member of Legislative Assembly from Mahmoodabad Assembly constituency of Uttar Pradesh by defeating six time MLA, Nagendra Singh Verma, who also served as cabinet minister in Government of Uttar Pradesh. In 2022 Uttar Pradesh Legislative Assembly elections, Maurya secured victory over Verma by a margin of 5689 votes. Prior to this, in 2017 Uttar Pradesh Assembly elections, she was defeated by Verma by a margin of 1906 votes, yet, Bhartiya Janata Party decided to make her a candidate for the second time from Mahmoodabad for 2022 elections.
