= Mahmoodabad Assembly constituency =

Constituency of the Uttar Pradesh legislative assembly in India

Mahmoodabad
- Constituency No. 151 for the Uttar Pradesh Legislative Assembly

Constituency details
- Country: India
- Region: North India
- State: Uttar Pradesh
- District: Sitapur
- Established: 1961
- Total electors: 263,909 (2012)
- Reservation: None

Member of Legislative Assembly
- 18th Uttar Pradesh Legislative Assembly
- Incumbent Asha Maurya
- Party: Bharatiya Janata Party

Mahmoodabad Assembly constituency is one of the 403 constituencies of the Uttar Pradesh Legislative Assembly, India. It is a part of the Sitapur district and one of the five assembly constituencies in the Sitapur Lok Sabha constituency. First election in this assembly constituency was held in 1962 after the "DPACO (1961)" (delimitation order) was passed in 1961. After the "Delimitation of Parliamentary and Assembly Constituencies Order" was passed in 2008, the constituency was assigned identification number 151.

== Wards / Areas ==
Extent of Mahmoodabad Assembly constituency is KCs Pahla, Mahmoodabad, Mahmoodabad MB, Paitepur NP, PCs Sadarpur, Bilauli Nan Kari, Rajparapur, Hajipur, Bajehra, Pokhara Kala, Sultanapur, Bhudkuda, Aiwapur, Dharampur, Lalpur, Khapura, Ahibanpur, Angethuwa, Pipari, Dhakhwa, Kodaura & Rasulabad of Sadarpur KC of Mahmoodabad Tehsil.

== Members of the Legislative Assembly ==
#	Term	Name	Party	From	To	Days	Comments	Ref
01	01st Vidhan Sabha	-	-	Mar-1952	Mar-1957	1,849	Constituency not in existence	
02	02nd Vidhan Sabha	-	-	Apr-1957	Mar-1962	1,800	Constituency not in existence	
03	03rd Vidhan Sabha	Shivendra Pratap	Bharatiya Jana Sangh	Mar-1962	Mar-1967	1,828	-	
04	04th Vidhan Sabha	B. Prasad	Samyukta Socialist Party	Mar-1967	Apr-1968	402	-	
05	05th Vidhan Sabha	Shayam Sundar Lal Gupta	Indian National Congress	Feb-1969	Mar-1974	1,832	-	
06	06th Vidhan Sabha	Ammar Rizvi	Indian National Congress	Mar-1974	Apr-1977	1,153	-	
07	07th Vidhan Sabha	Ram Narain Verma	Janata Party	Jun-1977	Feb-1980	969	-	
08	08th Vidhan Sabha	Ammar Rizvi	Indian National Congress (I)	Jun-1980	Mar-1985	1,735	-	
09	09th Vidhan Sabha	Raja Mohammad Amir Mohammad Khan	Indian National Congress	Mar-1985	Nov-1989	1,725	-	
10	10th Vidhan Sabha	Raja Mohammad Amir Mohammad Khan	Indian National Congress	Dec-1989	Apr-1991	488	-	
11	11th Vidhan Sabha	Narendra Singh Verma	Bharatiya Janata Party	Jun-1991	Dec-1992	533	-	
12	12th Vidhan Sabha	Narendra Singh Verma	Bharatiya Janata Party	Dec-1993	Oct-1995	693	-	
13	13th Vidhan Sabha	Ammar Rizvi	Indian National Congress	Oct-1996	May-2002	1,967	-	
14	14th Vidhan Sabha	Narendra Singh Verma	Bharatiya Janata Party	Feb-2002	May-2007	1,902	-	
15	15th Vidhan Sabha	Narendra Singh Verma	Bharatiya Janata Party	May-2007	Mar-2012	1,762	-	
16	16th Vidhan Sabha	Narendra Singh Verma	Samajwadi Party	Mar-2012	Mar-2017	-	-	
17	17th Vidhan Sabha	Narendra Singh Verma	Samajwadi Party	Mar-2017	Mar-2022			
18	18th Vidhan Sabha	Asha Maurya	Bharatiya Janata Party	Mar-2022	Incumbent			

== Election results ==
=== 2027 ===
2027 Uttar Pradesh Legislative Assembly election: Mahmoodabad
Party	Candidate	Votes	%	±%
INDIA				
NDA				
BSP				
NOTA	None of the above			
Majority				
Turnout				
gain from		Swing		

=== 2022 ===
2022 Uttar Pradesh Legislative Assembly Election: Mahmoodabad
Party	Candidate	Votes	%	±%
BJP	Asha Maurya	92,091	41.89	+4.12
SP	Narendra Singh Verma	86,869	39.51	+0.84
BSP	Meesam Ammar Rizvi	35,304	16.06	−5.33
NOTA	None of the above	1,365	0.62	−0.29
Majority		5,222	2.38	+1.48
Turnout		219,853	69.66	−2.75
BJP gain from SP		Swing		

=== 2017 ===
2017 Uttar Pradesh Legislative Assembly Election: Mahmoodabad
Party	Candidate	Votes	%	±%
SP	Narendra Singh Verma	81,469	38.67	
BJP	Asha Maurya	79,563	37.77	
BSP	Pradyumn Verma	45,050	21.39	
NOTA	None of the above	1,896	0.91	
Majority		1,906	0.9	
Turnout		210,660	72.41	

=== 2012 ===
2012 General Elections: Mahmoodabad
Party	Candidate	Votes	%	±%
SP	Narendra Singh Verma	86,580	46.59	−
BSP	Mohd Ahmad Ansari	66,991	36.05	−
INC	Mohan Prasad	20,458	11.01	−
	Remainder 5 candidates	11,791	6.34	−
Majority		19,589	10.54	−
Turnout		185,820	70.41	−
SP hold		Swing		

== See also ==
- Sitapur district
- Sitapur Lok Sabha constituency
- Sixteenth Legislative Assembly of Uttar Pradesh
- Uttar Pradesh Legislative Assembly
- Vidhan Bhawan
