= Sitapur Lok Sabha constituency =

Constituency of the Indian parliament in Uttar Pradesh

Coordinates: 27.51°N 80.76°E

Sitapur UP-30
- Lok Sabha constituency
- Interactive Map Outlining Sitapur Lok Sabha constituency

Constituency details
- Country: India
- Region: North India
- State: Uttar Pradesh
- Assembly constituencies: Sitapur; Laharpur; Biswan; Sevata; Mahmoodabad
- Established: 1952
- Reservation: None

Member of Parliament
- 18th Lok Sabha
- Incumbent Rakesh Rathore
- Party: Indian National Congress
- Elected year: 2024

Sitapur Lok Sabha constituency is one of the 80 Lok Sabha (parliamentary) constituencies in Uttar Pradesh state in northern India.

== Assembly segments ==
Presently, Sitapur Lok Sabha constituency comprises five Vidhan Sabha (legislative assembly) segments. These are:

No	Name	District	Member	Party	2024 Lead
146	Sitapur	Sitapur	Rakesh Rathour	BJP	INC
148	Laharpur	Sitapur	Anil Kumar Verma	SP	INC
149	Biswan	Sitapur	Nirmal Verma	BJP	INC
150	Sevata	Sitapur	Gyan Tiwari	BJP	BJP
151	Mahmoodabad	Sitapur	Asha Maurya	BJP	INC

== Members of Parliament ==
Year	Member	Party
1952	Uma Nehru	Indian National Congress
1952	Paragi Lal	Indian National Congress
1957	Uma Nehru	Indian National Congress
1957	Paragi Lal	Indian National Congress
1962	Suraj Lal Verma	Jana Sangh
1967	Sharda Nand	Jana Sangh
1971	Jagdish Chandra Dikshit	Indian National Congress
1977	Har Govind Verma	Janata Party
1980	Rajendra Kumari Bajpai	Indian National Congress
1984	Rajendra Kumari Bajpai	Indian National Congress
1989	Rajendra Kumari Bajpai	Indian National Congress
1991	Janardan Prasad Mishra	Bharatiya Janata Party
1996	Mukhtar Anees	Samajwadi Party
1998	Janardan Prasad Mishra	Bharatiya Janata Party
1999	Rajesh Verma	Bahujan Samaj Party
2004	Rajesh Verma	Bahujan Samaj Party
2009	Kaisar Jahan	Bahujan Samaj Party
2014	Rajesh Verma	Bharatiya Janata Party
2019	Rajesh Verma	Bharatiya Janata Party
2024	Rakesh Rathore	Indian National Congress

== Election results ==
=== General Election 2024 ===
2024 Indian general elections: Sitapur
Party	Candidate	Votes	%	±%
INC	Rakesh Rathore	531,138	48.20	▲39.18
BJP	Rajesh Verma	441,497	40.06	▼8.27
BSP	Mahendra Singh Yadav	99,364	9.02	▼29.84
NOTA	None of the Above	6,958	0.63	▼0.20
Majority		89,641	8.13	▼1.34
Turnout		11,02,015	62.62	▼1.31
INC gain from BJP		Swing		

=== 2019 ===
2019 Indian general elections: Sitapur
Party	Candidate	Votes	%	±%
BJP	Rajesh Verma	514,528	48.33	+7.67
BSP	Nakul Dubey	4,13,695	38.86	+3.17
INC	Kaiser Jahan	96,018	9.02	+6.19
PSP(L)	Vijay Kumar Mishra	1,742	0.16	
NOTA	None of the Above	8,873	0.83	−0.4
Majority		1,00,833	9.47	+4.5
Turnout		10,65,222	63.93	
BJP hold		Swing		

=== 2014 ===
2014 Indian general elections: Sitapur
Party	Candidate	Votes	%	±%
BJP	Rajesh Verma	417,546	40.66	
BSP	Kaiser Jahan	3,66,519	35.69	
SP	Bharat Tripathi	1,56,170	15.21	
INC	Vaishali Ali	29,104	2.83	
Independent	Suchita Kumar	8,959	0.87	
NOTA	None of the Above	12,682	1.23	
Majority		51,027	4.97	
Turnout		10,26,987	66.25	
BJP gain from BSP		Swing		

== See also ==
- Sitapur district
- List of constituencies of the Lok Sabha
