= Rakesh Rathore =

Indian politician

Member of Parliament, Lok Sabha
- Incumbent
- Assumed office 4 June 2024
- Preceded by: Rajesh Verma
- Constituency: Sitapur

Member of Uttar Pradesh Legislative Assembly
- In office 2017–2022
- Preceded by: Radhey Shyam Jaisawal
- Succeeded by: Rakesh Rathore (different)
- Constituency: Sitapur

Personal details
- Born: 4 December 1964 (age 61) Sitapur, Uttar Pradesh, India
- Party: Indian National Congress
- Occupation: Politician

Rakesh Rathore is an Indian politician, member of the Indian National Congress. He is currently serving as a Member of Parliament from the Lok Sabha seat of Sitapur. He was member of the Uttar Pradesh Legislative Assembly from Sitapur Assembly constituency.

== Career ==
He was elected from Sitapur in the 2017 election as the candidate of the Bharatiya Janata Party.

In May 2021, several audio clips of his private conversations were leaked in which he was being severely critical of the government, especially on the Coronavirus pandemic response and also complaining about a casteist orientation within the party. After the leak, he explained that he had tried to raise various issues with the government, giving the example of a trauma center in his city Sitapur that was built only on paper but that they don't really listen to ordinary MLAs. He also said that he couldn't speak much anymore after the leak because he had been put under threat of sedition charges if he spoke too much. It was seen that he was regularly pestered by the police after the incident. In 2022, he joined Congress. According to him, all of BJP's policies were against the common man, that he had once been raising his voice inside the party for the people's issues but to no avail. He said that he had joined Congress because if there was any person fighting for the people of India, it was actually Rahul Gandhi who must be strengthened and that only when the country and the Constitution are saved, only then will they all be saved and not by bending to the BJP.

In the 2022 election in UP, he was replaced by the BJP by a car mechanic with the same name as him to contest on the Sitapur seat who was later made a minister of state after the BJP won. He did not contest the election himself. In the 2024 Indian general election, Rakesh Rathore was declared the Congress candidate from Lok Sabha seat of Sitapur after the initial candidate Nakul Dubey who used to be the usual candidate from the seat and had joined the Congress leaving the Bahujan Samaj Party suddenly refused to contest the election. He won the election against the incumbent Rajesh Verma from the BJP by a margin of about 90,000.

== Rape allegations and arrest ==
On 25 January 2025, Rathore was arrested in connection with a First Information Report (FIR) filed by a 35-year-old woman accusing him of sexual exploitation. Rathore had been untraceable for nearly two weeks after the case was registered on 17 January. Following his arrest, Rathore was produced before a court, which remanded him to 14 days of judicial custody. He was subsequently sent to jail.

According to Circle Officer of Sitapur City, Rathore was apprehended at his residence in Sitapur around noon while speaking to members of the media. The police had obtained a non-bailable warrant against Rathore on 22 January after he failed to appear for questioning despite being served a notice at his residence, directing him to present himself by 23 January. Police officials stated that they had visited the MP’s residence multiple times but were unable to locate him.

The FIR, filed by the woman, alleged that Rathore had sexually assaulted her, promising to marry and advance her political career to ensure her silence. The case was registered under Sections 64 (rape), 351(3) (criminal intimidation), and 127(2) (wrongful confinement) of the Bharatiya Nyaya Sanhita.

The victim underwent a medical examination, and her statement was recorded before a magistrate. She also submitted purported electronic evidence, including call recordings between her and the MP, to support her allegations. A member of the State Women Commission met with the victim to record her statement, according to police reports.

In March 2025, a district court in Sitapur granted him bail.
