= Rakesh Rathour =

Indian politician

Rakesh Rathour "Guru"

Minister of State: Urban Employment & Poverty Alleviation
- Incumbent
- Assumed office March 25, 2022
- Chief Minister: Yogi Adityanath

Member of the Uttar Pradesh legislative assembly
- Incumbent
- Assumed office 10 March 2022
- Preceded by: Rakesh Rathore
- Constituency: Sitapur

Personal details
- Party: Bharatiya Janata Party
- Occupation: Politician

Rakesh Rathore, alias Guru, alternatively Rakesh Rathour, is an Indian politician representing Sitapur, Uttar Pradesh Assembly constituency since 2022. He is a member of Bharatiya Janata Party. Rathore won in 2022 Uttar Pradesh Legislative Assembly election. He was a car mechanic who had the same name as the previous MLA Rakesh Rathore. The previous MLA fell into controversy with the Yogi Adityanath government after audio clips were leaked of his private conversations in which he was being extremely critical and harsh on the government after which Rakesh Rathour was found and made his replacement.

In 2023, Rakesh Rathour himself became the subject of a major controversy after a video surfaced showing his sons, their driver and gunner attacking and tearing the clothes of two women, a police complaint was filed against them but no action was taken.
