= Bakshi Ka Talab Assembly constituency =

Constituency of the Uttar Pradesh legislative assembly in India

Bakshi Ka Talab
- Constituency No. 169 for the Uttar Pradesh Legislative Assembly

Constituency details
- Country: India
- Region: North India
- State: Uttar Pradesh
- District: Lucknow
- Lok Sabha constituency: Mohanlalganj
- Total electors: 4,56,965
- Reservation: None

Member of Legislative Assembly
- 18th Uttar Pradesh Legislative Assembly
- Incumbent Yogesh Shukla
- Party: Bharatiya Janata Party
- Elected year: 2022
- Preceded by: Avinash Trivedi

Bakshi Ka Talab is a constituency of the Uttar Pradesh Legislative Assembly covering the city of Bakshi Ka Talab in the Lucknow district of Uttar Pradesh, India. Bakshi Ka Talab is one of five assembly constituencies in the Mohanlalganj Lok Sabha constituency. Since 2008, this assembly constituency is numbered 169 amongst 403 constituencies.

== Members of Legislative Assembly ==
Year	Member	Party
Till 2012 : Constituency did not exist
2012	Gomti Yadav	Samajwadi Party
2017	Avinash Trivedi	Bharatiya Janata Party
2022	Yogesh Shukla	Bharatiya Janata Party

== Election results ==
=== 2027 ===
2027 Uttar Pradesh Legislative Assembly election: Bakshi Ka Talab
Party	Candidate	Votes	%	±%
INDIA				
NDA				
BSP				
NOTA	None of the above			
Majority				
Turnout				
gain from		Swing		

=== 2022 ===
2022 Uttar Pradesh Legislative Assembly election: Bakshi Ka Talab
Party	Candidate	Votes	%	±%
BJP	Yogesh Shukla	147,922	46.36	▲9.92
SP	Gomti Yadav	120,134	37.65	▲9.32
BSP	Salahuddin Siddiqui	35,167	11.02	▼18.78
INC	Lalan Kumar	9,056	2.84	
NOTA	None of the above	2,204	0.69	▼0.18
Majority		27,788	8.71	▲2.07
Turnout		319,052	69.82	▲2.94
BJP hold		Swing		

=== 2017 ===
Bharatiya Janata Party candidate Avinash Trivedi won in 2017 Uttar Pradesh Legislative Elections defeating Bahujan Samaj Party candidate Nakul Dubey by a margin of 17,584 votes.

U. P. Legislative Assembly Election, 2017: Bakshi Ka Talab
Party	Candidate	Votes	%	±%
BJP	Avinash Trivedi	96,482	36.44	
BSP	Nakul Dubey	78,898	29.8	
SP	Gomti Yadav	74,995	28.33	
LKD	Rajendra Prasad Yadav	4,283	1.62	
NOTA	None of the above	2,271	0.87	
Majority		17,584	6.64	
Turnout		264,762	66.88	
BJP gain from SP		Swing		

=== 2012 ===
U. P. Legislative Assembly Election, 2012: Bakshi Ka Talab
Party	Candidate	Votes	%	±%
SP	Gomti Yadav	79,629	36.76	
BSP	Nakul Dubey	77,730	35.88	
INC	Sunita Singh	26,537	12.25	
BJP	Sanjay Kumar Singh	9,906	4.57	
PECP	Khayam Raza	7,004	3.23	
Majority		1,899	0.88	
Turnout		2,16,632	67.09	
SP win (new seat)				
