= Paragi Lal =

Indian politician

Member of Parliament, Lok Sabha
- In office 1952-1962
- Constituency: Sitapur, Uttar Pradesh

Member of Constituent Assembly of India
- In office 9 December 1946 – 24 January 1950

Personal details
- Born: March 1898 Sekhapur, Sitapur district
- Party: Indian National Congress
- Spouse: Kamla Devi

Paragi Lal was an Indian politician. He was elected to the Lok Sabha, the lower house of the Parliament of India from Sitapur, Uttar Pradesh as a member of the Indian National Congress. He was also a member of the Constituent Assembly of India.
