= Sharda Nand =

Indian politician

Member of Parliament, Lok Sabha
- In office 1967-1971
- Preceded by: Suraj Lal Verma
- Succeeded by: Jagdish Chandra Dikshit
- Constituency: Sitapur, Uttar Pradesh

Personal details
- Party: Bharatiya Jana Sangh

Sharda Nand was an Indian politician. He was elected to the Lok Sabha, the lower house of the Parliament of India from the Sitapur, Uttar Pradesh as a member of the Bharatiya Jana Sangh.
