= Rajesh Verma (Sitapur politician) =

Indian politician (born 1960)

Member of Parliament, Lok Sabha
- In office 16 May 2014 – 4 June 2024
- Preceded by: Kaisar Jahan
- Succeeded by: Rakesh Rathore
- Constituency: Sitapur

Personal details
- Born: 6 November 1960 (age 65) Sitapur, Uttar Pradesh, India
- Party: Bharatiya Janata Party
- Spouse: Ranjana Verma (m. 1981)
- Children: 1 sons and 2 daughters
- Parent(s): Shri Krishna Pal Singh Verma (Father); Smt Sudha Devi Verma (Mother)

Rajesh Verma (born 6 November 1960) is an Indian politician, a member of the Bharatiya Janata Party and former Lok Sabha Member of Parliament. He was elected to the 13th Lok Sabha in 1999, the 14th Lok Sabha in 2004, the 16th Lok Sabha in 2014 and the 17th Lok Sabha in 2019 from Sitapur constituency in Uttar Pradesh state. In 2019 he won his fourth 4th election in Sitapur as a BJP candidate by 101,000 votes. He lost his Lok Sabha MP seat in the 2024 Indian General Election from Sitapur.

== Early life and education ==
Rajesh Verma was born on 6 November 1960 (Village-Tikauna, Post-Bhadfar, Tahseel- Laharpur, Tambaur, District-Sitapur

a child to the family of Shri Krishna Pal Singh Verma and Smt Sudha Devi Verma. In 1978 he completed his intermediate from Board of High School and Intermediate Education Uttar Pradesh. He completed his bachelor's degree from Lucknow University and master's degree in arts from Chhatrapati Shahu Ji Maharaj University.

== Political career ==
Verma started his political career in 1996 when he fought 1996 Uttar Pradesh Legislative Assembly election as a Bahujan Samaj Party candidate from Behta (now Sevata (Assembly constituency)) constituency but lost by a margin of 13,294 votes. He won his first election when he fought 1999 Indian general election as a Bahujan Samaj Party candidate from Sitapur constituency, defeating Janardan Prasad Mishra of Bharatiya Janata Party. He again won 2004 2004 Indian general election from Sitapur constituency. In 2009 Indian general election he changed his constituency to Dhaurahra (Lok Sabha constituency) but lost to Indian National Congress Jitin Prasada by the margin of 1,84,509 votes. After serving Bahujan Samaj Party for almost 22 years, Verma joined Bhartiya Janata Party in December 2013. He was given ticket by Bhartiya Janata Party to fought from Sitapur (Lok Sabha Constituency) constituency in 2014 2014 Indian General Election, where he won the seat by defeating his nearest rival Kaisar Jahan of Bahujan Samaj Party by 51,027 votes. In 2015 Bharatiya Janata Party leadership appointed him state president of BJP OBC Morcha Uttar Pradesh.

== Positions held ==
- 1999: Elected to 13th Lok Sabha
- 1999-2000: Member, Committee on Petroleum and Chemicals
- 2000-2004: Member, Consultative Committee, Mines and Minerals
- 2004: Re-elected to 14th Lok Sabha( 2nd term) Leader, BSP Parliamentary Party, Lok Sabha Chairman, Committee on Absence of Members from the Sittings of the House Member, Committee on Petroleum and Natural Gas Member, Committee on Public Undertakings Member, Committee on Provision of Computers for MPs, Offices of Parties, Officers of Lok Sabha Secretariat Member, Railway Convention Committee Member, General Purposes Committee
- 2006: Chairman, Committee on Absence of Members from the Sittings of the HouseMember, Parliamentary Forum on Water Conservation & Management
- 2007: Member, Standing Committee on Defence
- 2008: Member, Committee on Public Undertakings
- May 2014: Re-elected to 16th Lok Sabha (3rd term)
- 14 August 2014: 30 April 2017 Member, Committee on Estimates
- 1 September 2014 onwards: Member, Standing Committee on Petroleum and Natural Gas
- Member, Consultative Committee, Ministry of Coal
- 3 July 2015: Member, Sub Committee-II, Committee on Estimates.
- 1 Sep 2014 - 25 May 2019: Member, Standing Committee on Petroleum and Natural Gas
- Member, Consultative Committee, Ministry of Coal
- 3 July 2015: Member, Sub Committee-II, Committee on Estimates
- May 2019: Re-elected to 17th Lok Sabha (4th term)
- 31 July 2019: Member, Committee on Welfare of Other Backward Classes
- 13 Sept. 2019: Member, Standing Committee on Finance
- Member, Consultative Committee, Ministry of Heavy Industries and Public Enterprises
- 19 April 2021: Chairman, Committee on Welfare of Other Backward Classes
