= Nakul Dubey =

Indian politician

Minister of Urban Development, Environment and Prohibition Government of Uttar Pradesh
- In office 2007 – 2012

Personal details
- Party: Indian National Congress
- Education: LL.B.

Nakul Dubey is an Indian politician from the Indian National Congress and a former urban development minister in the Government of Uttar Pradesh when Mayawati was Chief Minister. Facebook; X(earlier Twitter)

Before joining politics in 2007, Dubey was an advocate by profession, practising in Lucknow High Court. He was also elected as a member of the Bar Council of Uttar Pradesh in 2006, securing the maximum votes in the state.

Dubey quit his career as a lawyer in 2007 and contested the Uttar Pradesh Vidhan Sabha elections in the Mahona constituency as a BSP candidate. He was Minister of Urban Development, Environment and Prohibition during 2007–12.

In 2012, Dubey contested the Legislative Assembly elections in Bakshi Kaa Talab constituency, Lucknow district. He lost by nearly 2,000 votes.

Subsequently, in the 2014 Lok Sabha elections, Dubey stood as a candidate in Lucknow. Again, he did not win.

In the 2017 Uttar Pradesh Legislative Elections Bahujan Samaj Party candidate Dubey lost to Bharatiya Janata Party candidate Avinash Trivedi by a margin of 17,584 votes.

Dubey was given the Jawaharlal Nehru National Urban Renewal Mission Award for the best work in Kanpur.

In 2019, he contested Lok Sabha elections from Sitapur on BSP seat but lost to Rajesh Verma of BJP.

In May 2022 he joined the Indian National Congress.

== Positions held ==
Year	Description
2007- 2012	Elected to 15th Uttar Pradesh Assembly: Cabinet Minister - Urban Development (Excluding Urban Poverty Alleviation), Environment, Urban Holistic Development, Taxes and Registration (Excluding institutional finance, Stamp and court fee)

== Electoral Performance ==
Year	Election	Party	Constituency Name	Result	Votes gained	Vote share%	Margin
2007	15th UP Assembly	BSP	Mahona	Won	54,604	26.38%	2,177
2012	16th UP Assembly	BSP	Bakshi Ka Talab	Lost	77,730	35.88%	1,899
2014	16th Lok Sabha	BSP	Lucknow	Lost	64,449	6.23%	4,96,657
2017	17th UP Assembly	BSP	Bakshi Ka Talab	Lost	78,898	29.80	17,584
2019	17th Lok Sabha	BSP	Sitapur	Lost	4,13,695	38.86%	1,00,833
