= Sevata Assembly constituency =

Constituency of the Uttar Pradesh legislative assembly in India

Sevata
- Constituency No. 150 for the Uttar Pradesh Legislative Assembly

Constituency details
- Country: India
- Region: North India
- State: Uttar Pradesh
- District: Sitapur
- Total electors: 263,543 (2012)
- Reservation: None

Member of Legislative Assembly
- 18th Uttar Pradesh Legislative Assembly
- Incumbent Gyan Tiwari
- Party: Bharatiya Janata Party

Sevata Assembly constituency is one of the 403 constituencies of the Uttar Pradesh Legislative Assembly, India. It is a part of the Sitapur district and one of the five assembly constituencies in the Sitapur Lok Sabha constituency. First election in this assembly constituency was held in 2012 after the "Delimitation of Parliamentary and Assembly Constituencies Order, 2008" was passed and the constituency was formed in 2008. The constituency is assigned identification number 150.

== Wards / Areas ==
Extent of Sevata Assembly constituency is KCs Shahpur, Sevata, Rewsa, PCs Jahangirabad & Basudaha of Jahangirabad KC of Biswan Tehsil; KC Rampur Mathura, PCs Chhatauni, Dhamauda & Jaravan of Sadarpur KC of Mahmoodabad Tehsil.

== Members of the Legislative Assembly ==
#	Term	Name	Party	From	To	Days	Comments	Ref
01	16th Vidhan Sabha	Mahendra Kumar Singh	Samajwadi Party	Mar-2012	Mar-2017	-	-	
02	17th Vidhan Sabh	Gyan Tiwari	Bharatiya Janata Party	Mar-2017	Mar-2022			
03	18th Vidhan Sabha	Gyan Tiwari	Bharatiya Janata Party	Mar-2022	Incumbent			

2017 MLA elections Gyan Tiwari won the election for Sevata seat.

== Election results ==
=== 2027 ===
2027 Uttar Pradesh Legislative Assembly election: Sevata
Party	Candidate	Votes	%	±%
INDIA				
NDA				
BSP				
NOTA	None of the above			
Majority				
Turnout				
gain from		Swing		

=== 2022 ===
2022 Uttar Pradesh Legislative Assembly Election: Sevata
Party	Candidate	Votes	%	±%
BJP	Gyan Tiwari	108,057	48.43	+4.2
SP	Mahendra Kumar Singh	87,776	39.34	+19.03
BSP	Ashish Pratap Singh	17,054	7.64	−16.2
VIP	Shanti Devi	4,300	1.93	
INC	Dr. Vijaynath Awasthi	2,984	1.34	
NOTA	None of the above	1,996	0.89	−0.53
Majority		20,281	9.09	−11.3
Turnout		223,131	71.04	−1.17
BJP hold		Swing		

=== 2017 ===
2017 Uttar Pradesh Legislative Assembly Election: Sevata
Party	Candidate	Votes	%	±%
BJP	Gyan Tiwari	94,697	44.23	
BSP	Engineer Mohammad Nasim	51,038	23.84	
SP	Shiv Kumar Gupta	43,488	20.31	
LKD	Rampal Yadav	13,130	6.13	
Rashtriya Vikalp Party	Amarjeet Singh	2,470	1.15	
NOTA	None of the above	2,990	1.42	
Majority		43,659	20.39	
Turnout		214,086	72.21	

=== 2012 ===
2012 Uttar Pradesh Legislative Assembly election: Sevata
Party	Candidate	Votes	%	±%
SP	Mahendra Kumar Singh	49,510	28.08	−
INC	Ammar Rizvi	47,063	26.69	−
BSP	Ranjana Bajpai	39,208	22.24	−
	Remainder 12 candidates	40,527	22.97	−
Majority		2,447	1.39	−
Turnout		176,308	66.9	−
SP hold		Swing		

== See also ==
- Sitapur district
- Sitapur Lok Sabha constituency
- Sixteenth Legislative Assembly of Uttar Pradesh
- Uttar Pradesh Legislative Assembly
- Vidhan Bhawan
