= Rajendra Kumar Gupta =

Indian politician

Minister of Finance & Parliamentary Affairs Government of Uttar Pradesh
- In office 24 June 1991 – 6 December 1992
- Chief Minister: Kalyan Singh

Member of Uttar Pradesh Legislative Assembly
- In office 1977–1996
- Preceded by: Shyam Kishore
- Succeeded by: Radhey Shyam Jaiswal
- Constituency: Sitapur

Personal details
- Born: 7 July 1936; Sitapur, United Provinces of British India (now in Uttar Pradesh)
- Died: 7 January 2003 (aged 66); Lucknow, Uttar Pradesh
- Political party: Bharatiya Janata Party
- Spouse: Rajkumari Gupta (m. 1956–2003)
- Children: 2 sons, 2 daughters
- Parent: Jugal Kishore Gupta (father)
- Education: M.A.
- Alma mater: Lucknow University
- Profession: Professor, Politician

Rajendra Kumar Gupta was a leader of Bharatiya Janata Party from Uttar Pradesh. He was president of the Uttar Pradesh state unit of the party. He was a member of Uttar Pradesh Legislative Assembly from Sitapur and served as cabinet minister holding finance portfolio in Kalyan Singh ministry. He died in 2003.
