= Gyan Tiwari =

Member of the Uttar Pradesh Legislative Assembly

Member of Uttar Pradesh Legislative Assembly
- Incumbent
- Assumed office March 2017
- Preceded by: Mahendra Kumar Singh
- Constituency: Sevata

Personal details
- Born: 5 July 1968 (age 58) Sitapur, Uttar Pradesh
- Party: Bharatiya Janata Party
- Education: University of Lucknow
- Profession: Politician

Gyan Tiwari is an Indian politician and a member of the 18th Uttar Pradesh Assembly from the Sevata Assembly constituency of Sitapur district. He is a member of the Bharatiya Janata Party.

== Early life ==
Gyan Tiwari was born on 5 July 1968 in Sitapur, Uttar Pradesh, to a Hindu Brahmin family of Swami Dayal Tiwari. He married Anju Tiwari on 7 March 1994, and they had three children.

== Education ==
Gyan Tiwari completed his graduation at the University of Lucknow in 1991.

== Posts held ==
| # | From | To | Position | Ref |
|---|---|---|---|---|
| 01 | March 2017 | March 2022 | Member, 17th Uttar Pradesh Assembly | |
| 02 | March 2022 | Incumbent | Member, 18th Uttar Pradesh Assembly | |

== See also ==
- 18th Uttar Pradesh Assembly
- Sevata Assembly constituency
- Uttar Pradesh Legislative Assembly
