= Yogesh Shukla =

Member of the Uttar Pradesh Legislative Assembly

Member of Uttar Pradesh Legislative Assembly
- Incumbent
- Assumed office March 2022
- Preceded by: Avinash Trivedi
- Constituency: Bakshi Kaa Talab

Personal details
- Born: 1 January 1960 (age 66) Kanpur, Uttar Pradesh
- Party: Bharatiya Janata Party
- Profession: Politician

Yogesh Shukla is an Indian politician and a member of the 18th Uttar Pradesh Assembly from the Bakshi Kaa Talab Assembly constituency of the Lucknow district. He is a member of the Bharatiya Janata Party.

== Early life ==
Yogesh Shukla was born on 1 January 1960 in Kanpur, Uttar Pradesh, to a Hindu family of Durga Shankar Shukla. He married Suman Shukla, and they had three children.

== See also ==
- 18th Uttar Pradesh Assembly
- Uttar Pradesh Legislative Assembly
- Bakshi Kaa Talab Assembly constituency
