= Narendra Singh Verma =

Indian politician

MLA, 17th Legislative Assembly
- Incumbent
- Assumed office Mar 2017
- Constituency: Mahmoodabad
- Constituency: Mahmoodabad

MLA, 16th Legislative Assembly
- Incumbent
- Assumed office Mar 2012
- Preceded by: Himself

MLA, 15th Legislative Assembly
- In office May 2007 – Mar 2012
- Preceded by: Himself
- Succeeded by: Himself
- Constituency: Mahmoodabad

MLA, 14th Legislative Assembly
- In office Feb 2002 – May 2007
- Preceded by: Ammar Rizvi
- Succeeded by: Himself
- Constituency: Mahmoodabad

MLA, 12th Legislative Assembly
- In office Dec 1993 – Oct 1995
- Preceded by: Himself
- Succeeded by: Ammar Rizvi
- Constituency: Mahmoodabad

MLA, 11th Legislative Assembly
- In office Jun 1991 – Dec 1992
- Preceded by: Raja Mohammad Amir Mohammad Khan
- Succeeded by: Himself
- Constituency: Mahmoodabad

Personal details
- Born: 10 January 1964 (age 62) Sitapur district
- Party: Samajwadi Party
- Spouse: Shashi Verma (wife)
- Children: 1 son & 3 daughters
- Parent: Ram Akbal Verma (father)
- Education: University of Lucknow
- Profession: Politician, businessperson & farmer

Narendra Singh Verma (born 10 January 1964) is an Indian politician and a member of the 17th Legislative Assembly in India. He represents the Mahmoodabad constituency of Uttar Pradesh and is a member of the Samajwadi Party political party.

== Early life and education ==
Narendra Singh Verma was born in Sitapur district. He attended the University of Lucknow and attained postgraduate degree.

== Political career ==
Narendra Singh Verma has been the MLA for six times in a row. He represented the Mahmoodabad, District Sitapur constituency and is a member of the Samajwadi Party.

== See also ==
- Mahmoodabad (Assembly constituency)
- Sixteenth Legislative Assembly of Uttar Pradesh
- Uttar Pradesh Legislative Assembly

== Posts held ==
#	From	To	Position	Comments
01	2017	present	chief whip vidhan sabha samajwadi party	Member of SP
02	2016	2017	cabinet minister of sugarcane development	Member of SP
03	2012	2016	minister of state, social welfare, soldier welfare etc.	Member of SP
04	2017	present	Member, 17th Legislative Assembly	Member of SP
05	2012	2017	Member, 16th Legislative Assembly	Member of SP
06	2007	2012	Member, 15th Legislative Assembly	Member of SP
07	2002	2007	Member, 14th Legislative Assembly	Member of BJP
08	1993	1995	Member, 12th Legislative Assembly	Member of BJP
09	1991	1992	Member, 11th Legislative Assembly	Member of BJP
