= Suvra Ghosh =

Judge of Calcutta High Court

Hon'ble Ms. Justice Suvra Ghosh

Judge of the Calcutta High Court
- Incumbent
- Assumed office 19 November 2018
- Nominated by: Ranjan Gogoi
- Appointed by: Ram Nath Kovind

Personal details
- Born: 23 April 1968 (age 58)
- Education: (LLB) Department of Law, University of Calcutta

Suvra Ghosh (born 23 April 1968) is an Indian jurist and a judge of Calcutta High Court in West Bengal. She has adjudicated in a significant number of cases, including those concerning the imposition of the death penalty in India. She is also notable for imposing a fine on the Calcutta High Court itself after ruling that the Court had previously erred in ordering a magistrate to retire over alleged misconduct.

== Education ==
Ghosh was educated in Kolkata, and studied law at the University of Calcutta, earning an integrated arts and law (B.A., LL.B.) degree in 1991.

== Career ==
Ghosh qualified into the judiciary by the West Bengal Judicial Service Examination in 1992. She was appointed a Civil Judge and later qualified into the Higher Judicial Service as well. She was the Registrar of the West Bengal State Legal Services Authority, a joint secretary in the Government of West Bengal's Department of Law, and a District and Sessions Judge in Darjeeling and Kolkata. On 19 November 2018, Ghosh was appointed an additional judge of the Calcutta High Court, which is the highest judicial forum for the state of West Bengal, and her appointment was made permanent on 4 May 2020.

== Notable judgments ==
In June 2019, Ghosh and another judge refused to order doctors in West Bengal to return to work after they went on strike to protest physical assault against doctors by families of patients in hospital. Ghosh instead asked the Government of West Bengal to negotiate with the doctors on strike to arrive at a resolution, in a widely-reported opinion. In the same month, Ghosh acquitted three persons who had been wrongly accused of collaborating with Maoist insurgents in India and imprisoned for 14 years pending trial, finding that there was no evidence that they had committed any crimes.

In July 2019, Ghosh and another judge, Sanjib Banerjee, held that the Calcutta High Court's administration had erred in ordering a railway magistrate to be suspended and forced to retire, after he passed an order rebuking railway officials for delays in trains. Holding that the administration's ruling was "disproportionate" and "shocking", they ordered a fine of ₹100,000 (equivalent to ₹130,000 or US$1,300 in 2026) to be paid by the High Court administration and reinstated the magistrate. Their ruling attracted wide attention, as it was reported as a case of the Calcutta High Court fining itself.

In December 2019, Ghosh and another judge, Joymalya Bagchi, commuted an order of death penalty to life imprisonment, in the case of a man convicted of being in possession of heroin. In their ruling, Ghosh and Bagchi held that statistical data did not indicate that the imposition of capital punishment acted as a deterrent to crime as one of their reasons for commuting the sentence.

In September 2020, the then Calcutta High Court Chief Justice, Thottathil B. Radhakrishnan, constituted special benches to hear cases relating to financial frauds, corruption, and Ponzi schemes, appointing Judge Suvra Ghosh and Judge Joymalya Bagchi to hear all such cases that involved former legislative representatives. They are expected to hear a number of cases, including those relating to the Saradha Group financial scandal.
