= Kaisar Jahan =

Indian politician

Member of Parliament, Lok Sabha
- In office 2009–2014
- Preceded by: Rajesh Verma
- Succeeded by: Rajesh Verma
- Constituency: Sitapur, Uttar Pradesh

Personal details
- Party: Indian National Congress (Since March 2019)
- Other political affiliations: Bahujan Samaj Party (till June 2018)
- Spouse: Mohammad Jasmir Ansari (m. 1985)

Kaisar Jahan is an Indian politician. In the 2009 election she was elected to the Lok Sabha from Sitapur in Uttar Pradesh as a member of the Bahujan Samaj Party. She later left the party and joined Congress in the year 2018. kaisar Jahan lost 2023 Nagarpalika Laharpur Town election by Margin of 2994 to independent candidate Javed Ahmad

Political Career

2006:- jahan begins political career succeeding her husband in following Laharpur town local body by winning receiving 14480 votes on independent symbol (chair) defeating Samajwadi candidate Raeesa khatoon W/o Jamal (seth) by margin of 5379 votes 2006 Laharpur Town election results State election Commission
