= Sitapur, Uttar Pradesh Assembly constituency =

Constituency of the Uttar Pradesh legislative assembly in India

Sitapur
- Constituency No. 146 for the Uttar Pradesh Legislative Assembly

Constituency details
- Country: India
- Region: North India
- State: Uttar Pradesh
- District: Sitapur
- Total electors: 378,716 (2017)
- Reservation: None

Member of Legislative Assembly
- 18th Uttar Pradesh Legislative Assembly
- Incumbent Rakesh Rathore
- Party: Bharatiya Janata Party
- Elected year: 2022

Sitapur Assembly constituency is one of the 403 constituencies of the Uttar Pradesh Legislative Assembly, India. It is a part of the Sitapur district and one of the five assembly constituencies in the Sitapur Lok Sabha constituency. First election in this assembly constituency was held in 1952 after the "DPACO (1951)" (delimitation order) was passed in 1951. After the "Delimitation of Parliamentary and Assembly Constituencies Order" was passed in 2008, the constituency was assigned identification number 146.

== Wards / Areas ==
Extent of Sitapur Assembly constituency is PCs Neriklan, Tikawapara, Ramnagar, Khagesiamau, Sitapur, Akoiya, Raseora, Rahimabad, Sahsapur, Alam Nagar, Kanawakhera, Parsehara, Majlispur, Ramkoat, Jawahirpur of Sitapur (Sadar) KC, PCs Khairabad, Asodhar, Gangapur Ulfatrai, Pakaria, Suhetara, Bhemari, Husainpur Kaimhara, Makhuwapur, Sultanpur Kamaicha, Tappa Khajuria, Paharpur, Asharafpur, Dahelia Srirang, Akbarganj, Bhadiyasi, Bhagautipur of Khairabad KC, PCs Kachnar, Rampur Bhuda, Hempur of Aliya KC, Sitapur MB & Khairabad MB of Sitapur Tehsil (Sadar).

== Members of the Legislative Assembly ==
Year	Member	Party
1952	Hakim Bashir Ahmad	Indian National Congress
1957	Harish Chandra	Indian National Congress
1962	Shardanand Dixit	Bharatiya Jana Sangh
1967	Tambareshwar Prasad	Bharatiya Jana Sangh
1969	Shyam Kishore	Indian National Congress
1974	Shyam Kishore	Indian National Congress
1977	Rajendra Kumar Gupta	Janata Party
1980	Rajendra Kumar Gupta	Bharatiya Janata Party
1985	Rajendra Kumar Gupta	Bharatiya Janata Party
1989	Rajendra Kumar Gupta	Bharatiya Janata Party
1991	Rajendra Kumar Gupta	Bharatiya Janata Party
1993	Rajendra Kumar Gupta	Bharatiya Janata Party
1996	Radhey Shyam Jaisawal	Samajwadi Party
2002	Radhey Shyam Jaisawal	Samajwadi Party
2007	Radhey Shyam Jaisawal	Samajwadi Party
2012	Radhey Shyam Jaisawal	Samajwadi Party
2017	Rakesh Rathore	Bhartiya Janata Party
2022	Rakesh Rathour (Guru)	Bhartiya Janata Party

== Election results ==
=== 2027 ===
2027 Uttar Pradesh Legislative Assembly election: Sitapur
Party	Candidate	Votes	%	±%
INDIA				
NDA				
BSP				
NOTA	None of the above			
Majority				
Turnout				
gain from		Swing		

=== 2022 ===
2022 Uttar Pradesh Legislative Assembly election: Sitapur
Party	Candidate	Votes	%	±%
BJP	Rakesh Rathour (Guru)	99,349	42.72	▲0.51
SP	Radhey Shyam Jaisawal	98,096	42.18	▲10.58
BSP	Khurshid Ansari	16,988	7.31	▼14.97
IND	Saket Mishra	10,567	4.54	
INC	Shamina Shafiq	2,886	1.24	
NOTA	None of the above	1,226	0.53	▼0.26
Majority		1,253	0.54	▼10.07
Turnout		232,552	58.24	▼3.58
BJP hold		Swing		

=== 2017 ===
17th Vidhan Sabha

2017 General Elections: Sitapur
Party	Candidate	Votes	%	±%
BJP	Rakesh Rathore	98,850	42.21	
SP	Radhey Shyam Jaisawal	74,011	31.6	
BSP	Ashfaq Khan	52,181	22.28	
NOTA	None of the above	1,842	0.79	
Majority		24,839	10.61	
Turnout		234,198	61.82	
BJP gain from SP		Swing		

== See also ==
- Sitapur district
- Sitapur Lok Sabha constituency
- Sixteenth Legislative Assembly of Uttar Pradesh
- Uttar Pradesh Legislative Assembly
- Vidhan Bhawan
