= Pirai River (India) =

The Pirai River flows through Kheri and Sitapur districts of Uttar Pradesh stare in India.

It rises in depressions near Khamaria village near Kasta town and flows south-east to form boundary between Sitpur and Kheri district. After crossing the north-eastern border of pargana Maholi, it has a very winding course. It then flows through the pargana of Sitapur to join the Sarayan on its right, a short distance below Sitapur city. It is the only tributary of Sarayan river.
