= Nirmal Verma (politician) =

Indian politician

Member of the Uttar Pradesh Legislative Assembly
- Incumbent
- Assumed office March 2022
- Constituency: Biswan Assembly constituency

Personal details
- Party: Bharatiya Janata Party
- Education: Kanpur University
- Occupation: Politician

Nirmal Verma (born 1964) is an Indian politician from Uttar Pradesh. He is a member of the Uttar Pradesh Legislative Assembly from Biswan Assembly constituency in Sitapur district. He won the 2022 Uttar Pradesh Legislative Assembly election representing the Bharatiya Janata Party.

== Early life and education ==
Verma is from Laharpur, Sitapur district, Uttar Pradesh. He is the son of Visheshvar Dyal Verma. He completed his BA in 1985 at a college affiliated with Kanpur University.

== Career ==
Verma won from Biswan Assembly constituency representing Bharatiya Janata Party in the 2022 Uttar Pradesh Legislative Assembly election. He polled 106, 014 votes and defeated his nearest rival, Afzaal Kausar of the Samajwadi Party, by a margin of 10,478 votes.
