= Mohammad Jasmir Ansari =

Indian politician (born 1968)

Deputy Leader of the Opposition in Uttar Pradesh Legislative Council
- Incumbent
- Assumed office 22 July 2024
- Chairman: Kunwar Manvendra Singh
- Leader of Opposition: Lal Bihari Yadav
- Preceded by: vacant

Member of Uttar Pradesh Legislative Council
- Incumbent
- Assumed office 6 July 2022
- Constituency: Elected by the MLAs

Member of Uttar Pradesh Legislative Assembly
- In office 13 May 2007 – 19 March 2017
- Preceded by: Anil Kumar Verma
- Succeeded by: Suneel Verma
- Constituency: Laharpur

Personal details
- Born: 12 January 1968 (age 58) Laharpur, Uttar Pradesh India
- Party: Samajwadi Party
- Other political affiliations: Indian National Congress; Bahujan Samaj Party
- Spouse: Kaisar Jahan (m. 1985)
- Profession: Politician; businessman

Mohammad Jasmir Ansari (born 12 January 1968) is an Indian politician and a member of the Uttar Pradesh Legislative Assembly in India. He represented the Laharpur constituency of Uttar Pradesh and is a member of the Bahujan Samaj Party.

== Early life and education ==
Mohammad Jasmir Ansari was born in Laharpur and he fully struggled in life when he came in politics, then Mohammad Salim Ansari (Sabhasad) helped him in beginning of his career. Salim Ansari was also famous in his time period as he won Sabhasad election 3 times.

== Political career ==
Mohammad Jasmir Ansari has been a MLA for two terms. He represented the Laharpur constituency and is a member of the Bahujan Samaj Party political party.

Jasmir Ansari has been elected as a Member of the Uttar Pradesh Legislative Council representing the Samajwadi Party in 2022.

== Posts held ==
01	2012	2017	Laharpur	Member, 16th Legislative Assembly
02	2007	2012	Laharpur	Member, 15th Legislative Assembly
03	2022		elected by MLA'S	Member,Uttar Pradesh Legislative Council

== See also ==
- Laharpur (Assembly constituency)
- Sixteenth Legislative Assembly of Uttar Pradesh
- Uttar Pradesh Legislative Assembly
