= Sitapur =

- Village
- Location of Sitapur in Uttar Pradesh, India Sitapur (India)
- Coordinates: 27.57°N 80.66°E
- Country: India
- State: Uttar Pradesh
- Division: Lucknow
- District: Sitapur
- Established: 1st century BC
- Founder: King Vikramaditya
- Named for: Sita

Government
  - Type: Municipal Council
  - Body: Sitapur Municipal Council
  - Municipal Chairperson: Neha Awasthi (BJP)
  - Lok Sabha MP: Rakesh Rathore
  - MLA: Rakesh Rathour Guru (BJP)
- Elevation (in meters): 138 m (453 ft)

Population (2011)
  - Total: 177,351
  - Density: 630/km^{2} (1,600/sq mi)

Languages
  - Official: Hindi, Urdu
- Time zone: UTC+5:30 (IST)
- PIN CODE: 261001
- Vehicle registration: UP-34
- Website: sitapur.nic.in

Sitapur is a city and a municipal board in Sitapur district in the Indian state of Uttar Pradesh. It is located 90 kilometres north of state capital, Lucknow. The traditional origin for the name is said to be by the King Vikramāditya from Rama's wife Sita.

== Administration ==
The district is divided into 7 Tehsils: Sitapur, Biswan, Mishrikh, Maholi, Laharpur, Mahmoodabad and Sidhauli. There are 19 blocks, 4 parliamentary constituencies (Sitapur, Mishrikh (SC), Mohanlalganj, Dhaurhara), 9 assembly constituencies (Sevata, Biswan, Mahmoodabad, Sidhauli (SC), Laharpur, Sitapur, Hargaon (SC), Mishrikh and Maholi), 19 Blocks and 26 Police Stations. Total population of the district is 44.84 lakh and the area is 5,743 km^{2}. There are 2,348 census villages and 1,601 Gram Panchayats in the district. The Vehicle UP-34 is Registered in Sitapur RTO Transport office.

== Demographics ==
Religions in Sitapur city (2011)
Religion	Percent
Hinduism	71.21%
Islam	27.66%
Sikhism	0.42%
Other or not stated	0.71%
Distribution of religions

Sitapur municipality has a population of 177,234. Sitapur has a sex ratio of 912 females per 1000 males and a literacy rate of 80.57%. 19,794 (11.17%) were under 6 years of age. Scheduled Castes and Scheduled Tribes made up 11.36% and 0.13% of the population respectively.

Hindi is the major language, spoken by 88.03% of the population. Urdu is spoken by 11.67% of the population.

== Rail ==
Sitapur has 2 railway stations, Sitapur Cantonment railway station andSitapur City Junction railway station.

== Notable people ==
- Manoj Kumar Pandey - Indian military officer
- Wajahat Mirza – Indian screenwriter and film director
- Ilyas Sitapuri - Pakistani historical fiction writer

== Politics ==
As the seat of the government of Uttar Pradesh, Lucknow is the site of the Uttar Pradesh Vidhan Sabha, Sitapur has 2 Loksabha seats and 9 Vidhan Sabha seats.
