= Paintepur =

Coordinates: 9.2167°N 1.8500°W

- nagar panchayat
- Interactive map of Paintepur
- Country: India
- State: Uttar Pradesh
- District: Sitapur

Population (2011)
  - Total: 13,917

Languages
  - Official: Hindi
- Time zone: UTC+5:30 (IST)
- Postal code: 261203

Paintepur is a town and a Nagar panchayat in Sitapur district in the Indian state of Uttar Pradesh.The current Chairman of Nagar Panchayat is Mohammed Afzal.

== Demographics ==
As of 2011 India census, Paintepur had a population of 13,917 comprising 7,182 males and 6,735 females giving a sex ratio of 938. Paintepur had an average literacy rate of 62.96%, lower than the state average of 67.68%, whilst, 2,199 of the population (15.8%) was under 6 years of age.
