= Kurtajpur =

Coordinates: 27°43′31.23″N 80°52′5.59″E

Kurtajpur, or Kurtalpur, is a village in Sitapur district in the Indian state of Uttar Pradesh.

== Economy ==
The villagers primarily engage in agriculture, while others hold governmental positions such as doctors, engineers, and teachers. However, only a few inhabitants of Kurtajpur possess graduate degrees.

Kurtajpur is the fastest developing of the neighboring villages.
