= Sarayan River =

Coordinates: 27°12′N 80°47′E

Sarayan
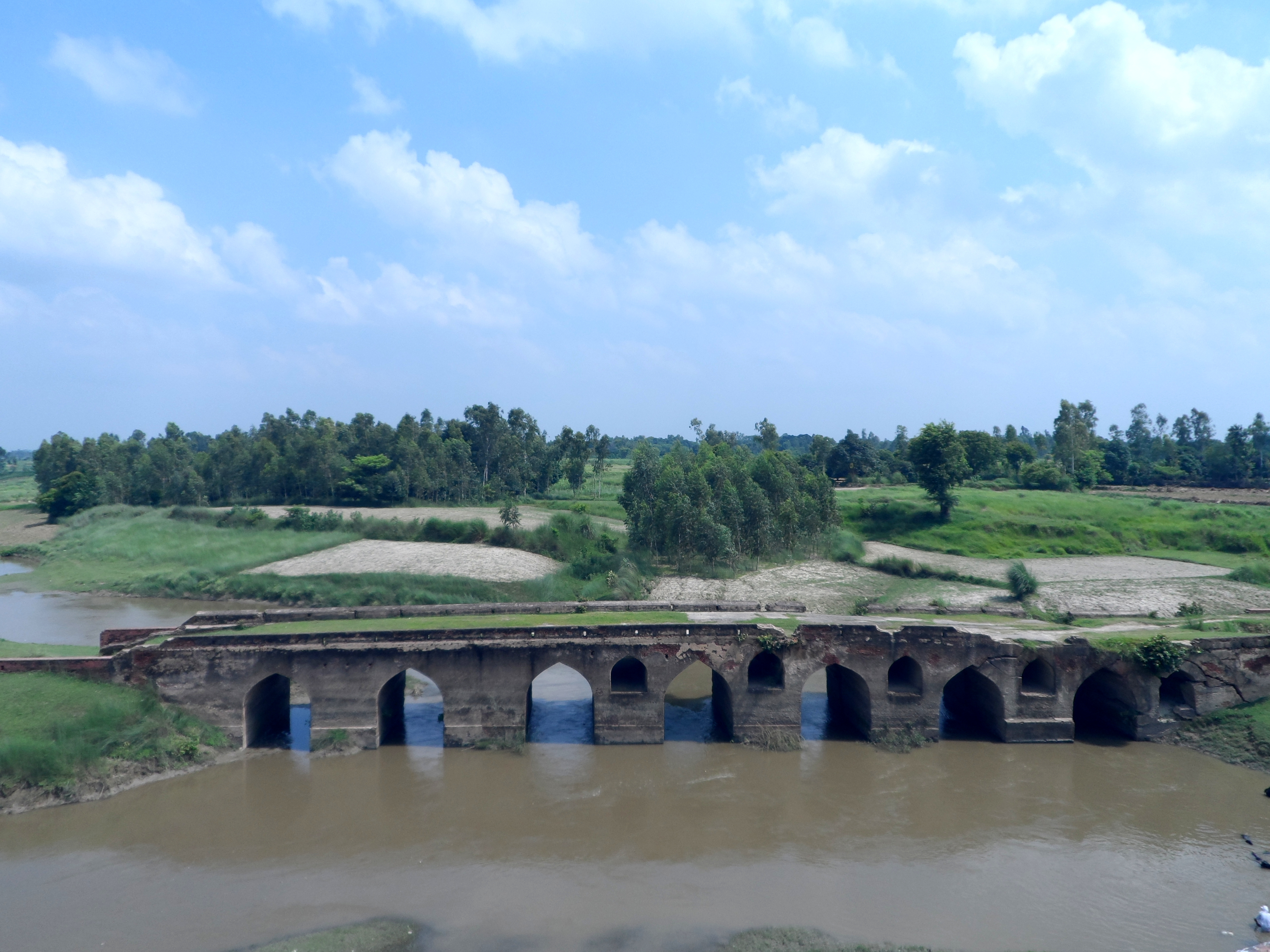
- An Old Bridge on Sarayan River
- Native name: सरायं (Hindi)

Location
- Country: India

Physical characteristics
- Source
  - location: Village Ahmed Nager Thana- Hydrabaad Gola (Uttar Pradesh)

Basin features
- River system: Ganga

Sarayan is small tributary of Gomti river which flows through Lakhimpur and Sitapur district of Uttar Pradesh.

== Course ==
Sarayan originates in Haidarabad paragana near the town of Gola Gokaranath. After a course of about 49 miles from its origin, it enters Sitapur district near the village of Naurangpur. It traverses from North to South in Sitapur flowing in a very irregular winding course. After running a few miles, it is joined by a small stream Jamwari near the village of Tehar, soon after which it takes a southerly course and reaches Sitapur where it passes through the middle of the city. Finally, it joins Gomati near the village of Hindaura in Sidhauli tehseel.

In the upper portion of its course, it the stream flows in a shallow bed, but further South the channel of this stream grows deeper and banks are high and sandy, and are intersected by ravines.

== Floods and navigation ==
In wet years, the river is liable to cause excessive and destructive floods in the town of Sitapur and other places which lie along the banks, but ordinarily it serves its purpose as a drainage line. It is navigable by small boats in only its lower reaches, but it is rarely used as a means of communication.

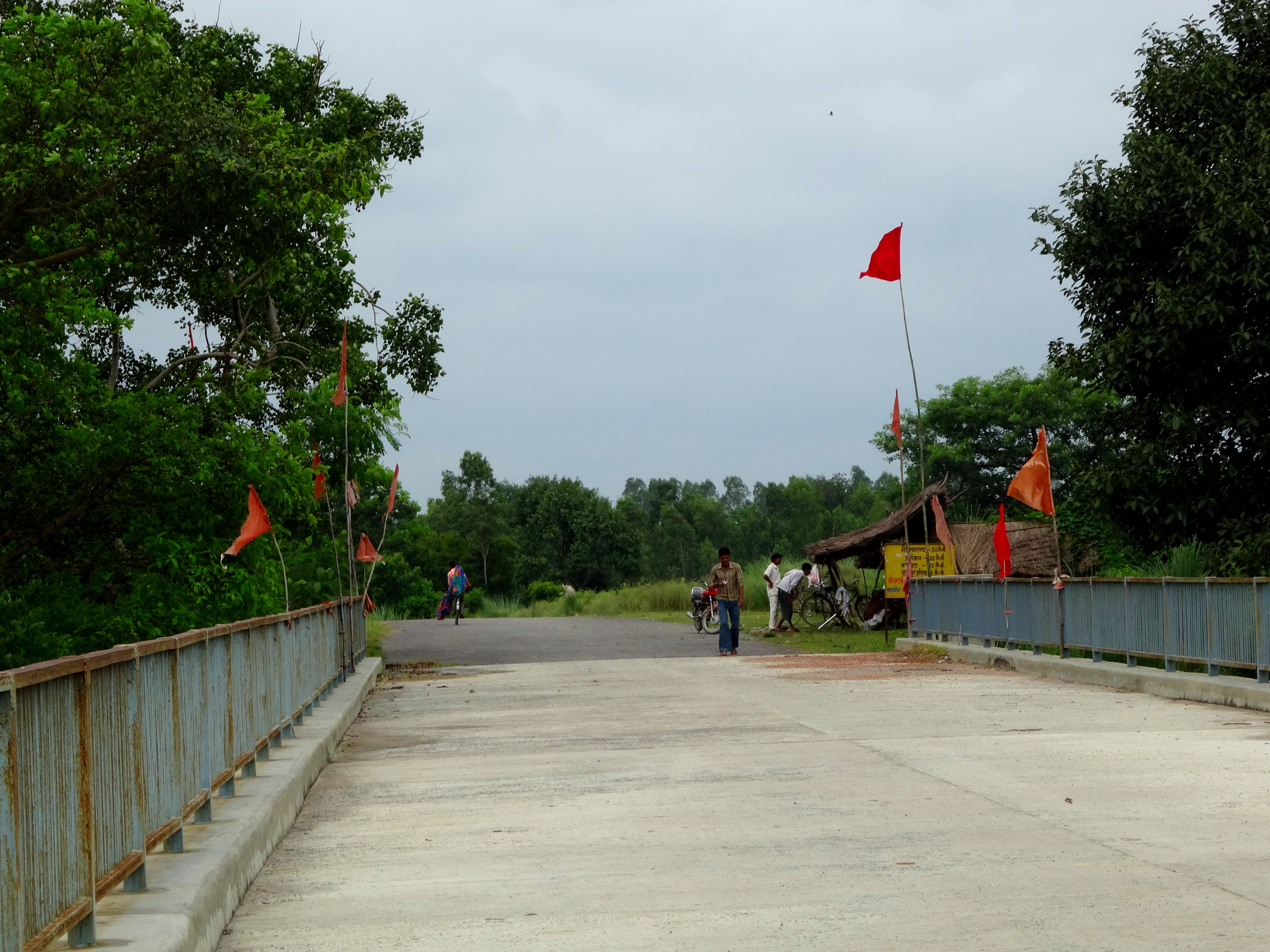
A Bridge on Sarayan near Laalpur village

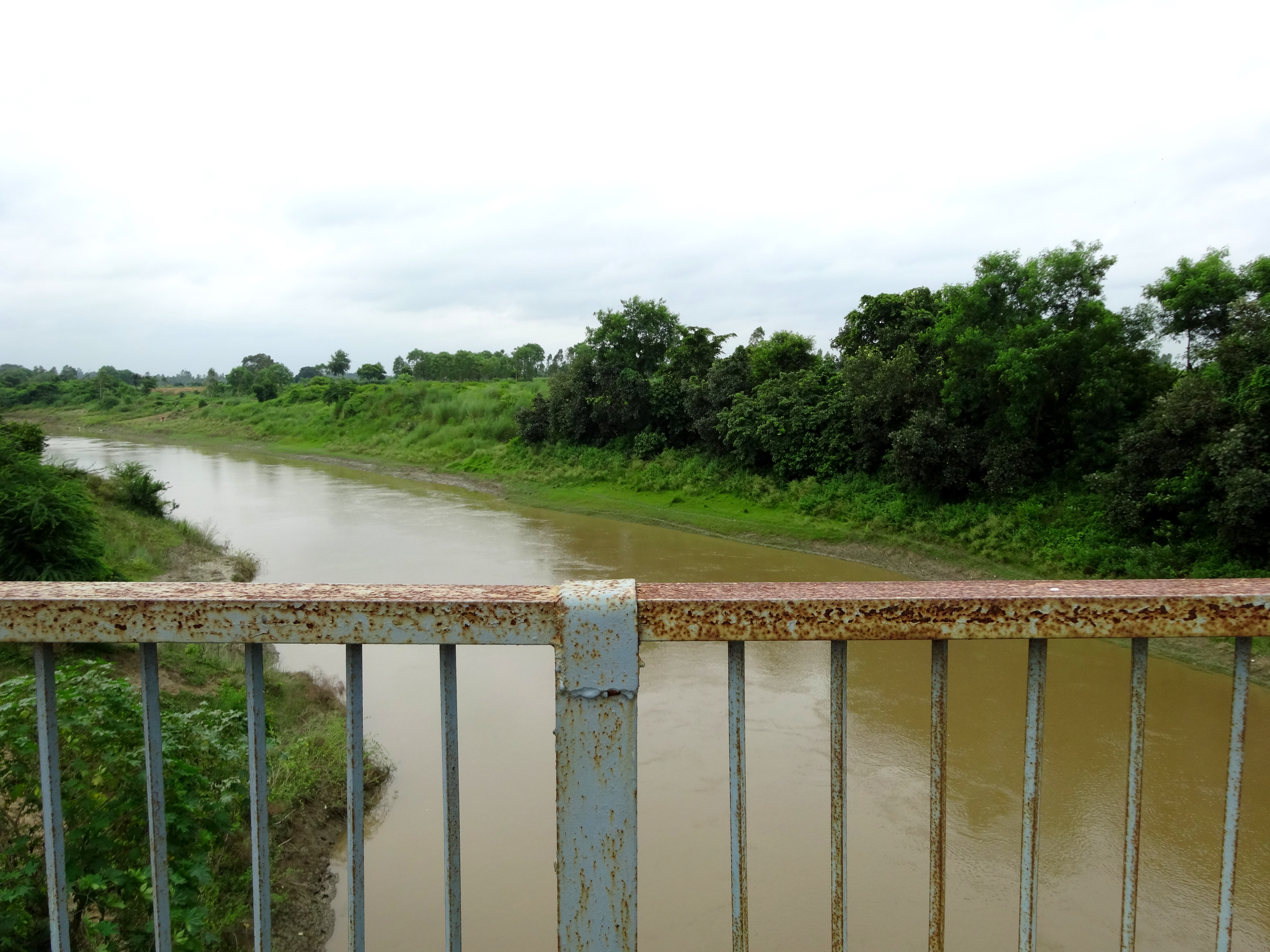
A view of Sarayan near Laalpur Ghat

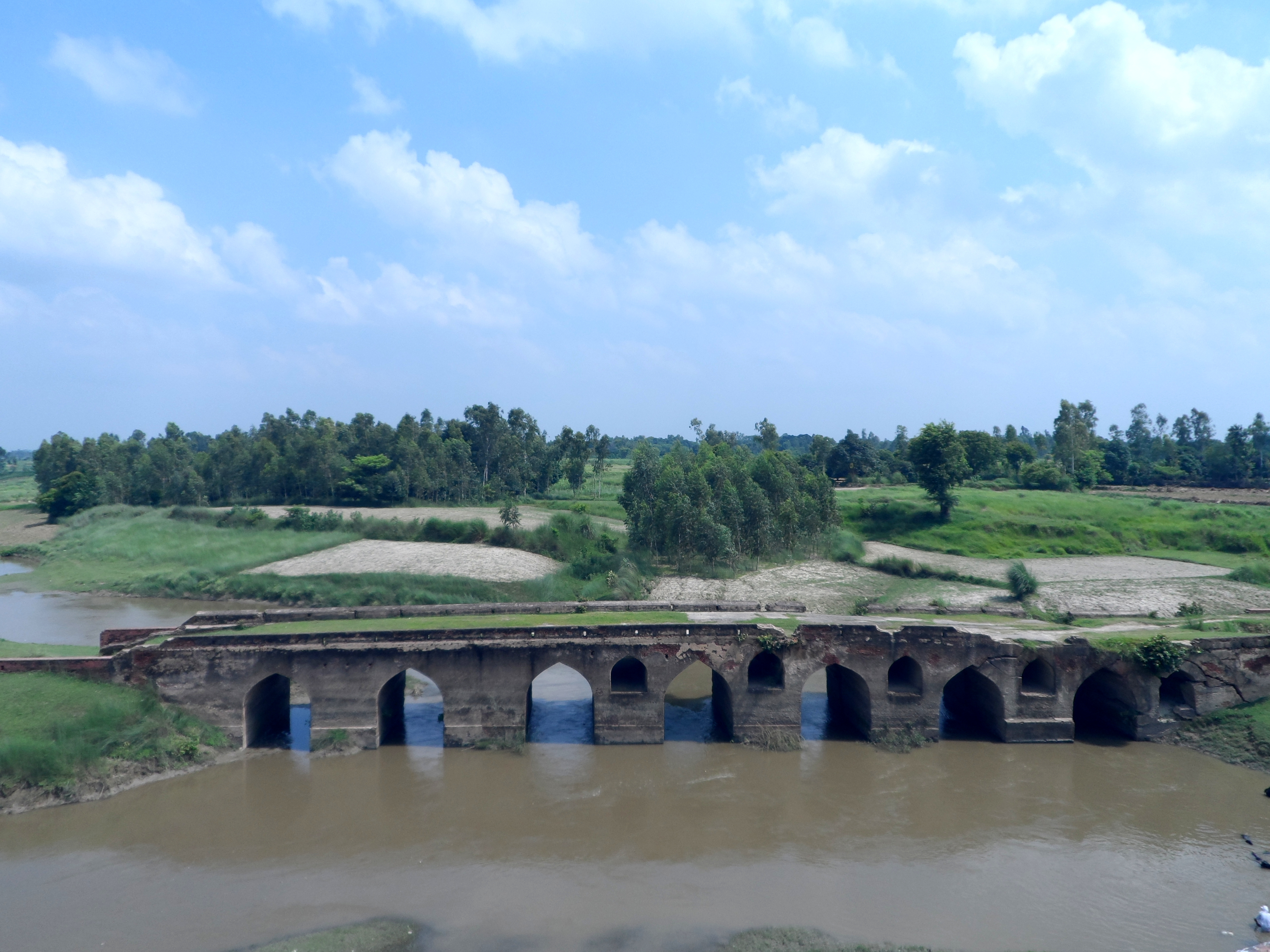
An old bridge on Sarayan near Rahimabaad village

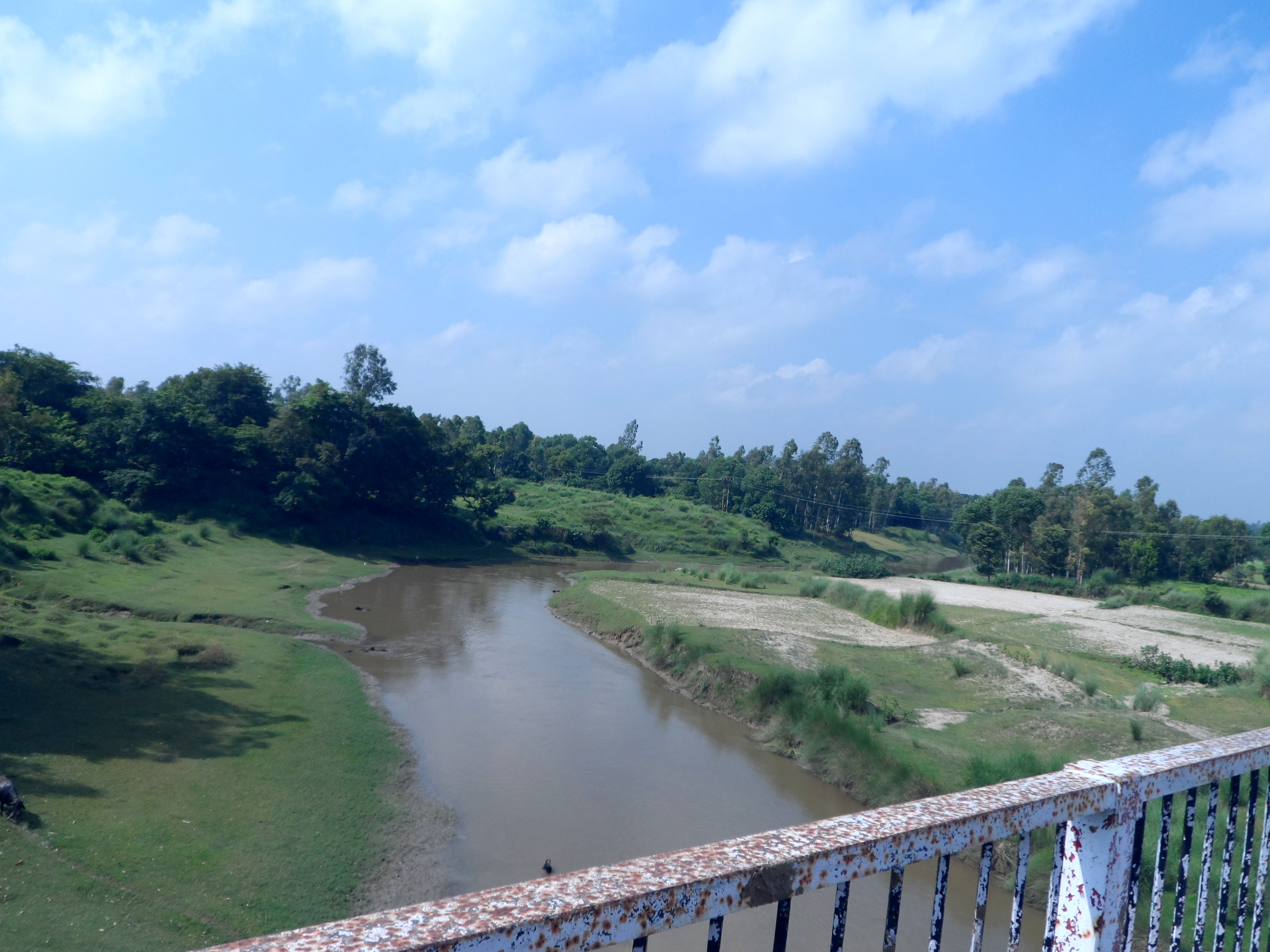
A view of Sarayan river

== Tributaries ==
The Sarayan is fed by several tributaries.

=== West bank tributaries ===
==== Jamwari ====
After flowing through the Kheri district, Jamwari forms, for a short distance, the boundary for that district and the pargana of Hargaon of Sitapur district where it joins the Sarayan river near the village of Tahar/Tehar/Tihar.

==== Pirai ====
Pirai raises in Kasta in Kheri district and after crossing the north-eastern border of pargana Maholi has a very winding course and flow through the pargana of Sitapur to join the Sarayan on its right, a short distance below Sitapur city.

==== Behta ====
Further south on the same bank, another tributary of Sarayan is Behta. It rises in Mishrikh pargana. After separating Korauna from Machhrehta it turn eastward through the latter pargana to join the Sarayan river near a small village of Rasulpur.

=== East bank tributaries ===
==== Gond ====
Gond is the most important and the largest tributary joining the Sarayan on its east bank. Gond river has its origins in swampy areas near Hargaon.

== See more ==
- Gomati
- Kathna
- Ghaghra
