= Rampal Yadav =

Indian politician

MLA, 16th Legislative Assembly
- Incumbent
- Assumed office Mar 2012
- Preceded by: Himself
- Constituency: Biswan
- Incumbent
- Assumed office Feb 2002

MLA, 14th Legislative Assembly
- Preceded by: Nirmal Verma
- Succeeded by: Himself
- Constituency: Biswan

Personal details
- Born: 2 February 1964 (age 62) Tambour Sitapur
- Party: Bahujan Samaj Party
- Spouse: Shanti Yadav (wife)
- Children: 2 sons & 2 daughters
- Parent: Visheshwar Lal Yadav (father)
- Education: Janta Inter College, Sitapur
- Profession: Politician, businessperson & farmer

Rampal Yadav is an Indian politician and a member of the 16th Legislative Assembly in India. He represents the Biswan constituency of Uttar Pradesh and was a member of the Samajwadi Party political party until 2017.

== Early life and education ==
Rampal Yadav was born in Sitapur district. He attended the famous Col. Brown Cambridge School in Dehra Dun and later the Janta College in Sitapur.

== Political career ==
Rampal Yadav has been a MLA for two terms. He represented the Biswan constituency and was a member of the Samajwadi Party political party, when he left the party to join the Lok Dal.

He is married to Shanti Yadav and has four children, two sons and two daughters. Rampal left Samajwadi party and joined Bahujan Samaj Party.

== Suspension ==
SP expelled him in April 2016 for his involvement in illegal activities. A complex built by him was demolished by Lucknow Development Authority. He was arrested along with 8 others including former MLA Rajendra Yadav. On 26 December, Yadav was accepted back into the SP.

== Posts held ==
#	From	To	Position	Comments
01	2012	2017	Member, 16th Legislative Assembly	
02	2002	2007	Member, 14th Legislative Assembly	

== See also ==
- Biswan (Assembly constituency)
- Sixteenth Legislative Assembly of Uttar Pradesh
- Uttar Pradesh Legislative Assembly
