= Pirai River =

The Pirai River may refer to:

- the Piraí River (Bolivia), a river in eastern Bolivia
- the Piraí River (Paraná), a river of Paraná state in southern Brazil
- the Piraí River (Rio de Janeiro), a river of Rio de Janeiro state in southeastern Brazil
- the Piraí River (Santa Catarina), a river of Santa Catarina state in southeastern Brazil
- the Pirai River (India), a river of India
