= Meera Nagar =

Indian village in Sitapur district

Meera Nagar is a village in Sitapur district, Uttar Pradesh, India.
