= Suneel Verma =

Indian politician

MLA, 17th Legislative Assembly
- In office 11 March 2017 – 10 March 2022
- Preceded by: Mohammad Jasmir Ansari
- Succeeded by: Anil Verma
- Constituency: Laharpur

Personal details
- Born: 29 November 1975 (age 50) Laharpur, Uttar Pradesh, India
- Citizenship: Indian
- Party: Bharatiya Janata Party
- Spouse: Rani Verma (Wife)
- Children: Arpit, Pulkit
- Parent: Shivnath Verma (Father)
- Education: University of Lucknow
- Profession: Politician & businessman

Suneel Verma is an Indian politician and a former member of the 17th Legislative Assembly in India. He represented the Laharpur constituency of Uttar Pradesh and is a member of the Bharatiya Janata Party.
