= Laharpur Assembly constituency =

Constituency of the Uttar Pradesh legislative assembly in India

Laharpur
- Constituency No. 148 for the Uttar Pradesh Legislative Assembly

Constituency details
- Country: India
- Region: North India
- State: Uttar Pradesh
- District: Sitapur
- Total electors: 294,892 (2012)
- Reservation: None

Member of Legislative Assembly
- 18th Uttar Pradesh Legislative Assembly
- Incumbent Anil Kumar Verma
- Party: Samajwadi Party
- Elected year: 2022

Laharpur is one of the 403 constituencies of the Uttar Pradesh Legislative Assembly, India. It is a part of the Sitapur district and one of the five assembly constituencies in the Sitapur Lok Sabha constituency. The first election in this assembly constituency was held in 1957 after the "DPACO (1956)" (delimitation order) was passed in 1956. After the Delimitation of Parliamentary and Assembly Constituencies Order was passed in 2008, the constituency was assigned identification number 148.

== Wards / Areas ==
Laharpur Assembly constituency consists of the KCs Tambaur, Laharpur, Parsendi, PCs Mador, Bohara, Sumrawan & Patrasa of Marsanda KC, Laharpur MB & Tambaur-Ahamadabad NP of Laharpur Tehsil.

== Members of the Legislative Assembly ==
#	Term	Name	Party	From	To	Days	Comments	Ref
01	01st Vidhan Sabha	-	-	Mar-1952	Mar-1957	1,849	Constituency not in existence	
02	02nd Vidhan Sabha	Pratap Bhan Prakash Singh	Independent	Apr-1957	Mar-1962	1,800	-	
03	03rd Vidhan Sabha	Bipin Behari Tewari	Bharatiya Jana Sangh	Mar-1962	Mar-1967	1,828	-	
04	04th Vidhan Sabha	V. Behari	Bharatiya Jana Sangh	Mar-1967	Apr-1968	402	-	
05	05th Vidhan Sabha	Abid Ali	Indian National Congress	Feb-1969	Mar-1974	1,832	-	
06	06th Vidhan Sabha	Abid Ali	Indian National Congress	Mar-1974	Apr-1977	1,153	-	
07	07th Vidhan Sabha	Abid Ali	Janata Party	Jun-1977	Feb-1980	969	-	
08	08th Vidhan Sabha	Hargovind Verma	Janata Party (Secular)	Jun-1980	Mar-1985	1,735	-	
09	09th Vidhan Sabha	Buniyad Husain Absari	Lok Dal	Mar-1985	Nov-1989	1,725	-	
10	10th Vidhan Sabha	Chandrakali Verma	Bharatiya Janata Party	Dec-1989	Apr-1991	488	-	
11	11th Vidhan Sabha	Anil Kumar Verma	Bharatiya Janata Party	Jun-1991	Dec-1992	533	-	
12	12th Vidhan Sabha	Anil Kumar Verma	Samajwadi Party	Dec-1993	Oct-1995	693	-	
13	13th Vidhan Sabha	Buniyad Husain Ansari	Bahujan Samaj Party	Oct-1996	May-2002	1,967	-	
14	14th Vidhan Sabha	Anil Kumar Verma	Samajwadi Party	Feb-2002	May-2007	1,902	-	
15	15th Vidhan Sabha	Mohammad Jasmir Ansari	Bahujan Samaj Party	May-2007	Mar-2012	1,762	-	
16	16th Vidhan Sabha	Mohammad Jasmir Ansari	Bahujan Samaj Party	Mar-2012	Mar 2017	-	-	
17	17th Vidhan Sabha	Suneel Verma	Bharatiya Janata Party	Mar 2017	Mar 2022	-	-	
18	18th Vidhan Sabha	Anil Verma	Samajwadi Party	Mar 2022	Incumbent	-	-	

== Election results ==
=== 2027 ===
2027 Uttar Pradesh Legislative Assembly election: Laharpur
Party	Candidate	Votes	%	±%
INDIA				
NDA				
BSP				
NOTA	None of the above			
Majority				
Turnout				
gain from		Swing		

=== 2022 ===
2022 Uttar Pradesh Legislative Assembly election: Laharpur
Party	Candidate	Votes	%	±%
SP	Anil Kumar Verma	112,987	47.05	
BJP	Sunil Verma	99,832	41.57	+6.95
BSP	Mohammad Junaid Ansari	19,809	8.25	−22.4
NOTA	None of the above	1,890	0.79	−0.47
Majority		13,155	5.48	+1.51
Turnout		240,151	67.74	+0.17
SP gain from BJP		Swing		

=== 2017 ===
2017 Uttar Pradesh Legislative Assembly Election: Laharpur
Party	Candidate	Votes	%	±%
BJP	Suneel Verma	79,467	34.62	
BSP	Mohammad Jasmir Ansari	70,349	30.65	
INC	Anil Kumar Verma	67,102	29.23	
NOTA	None of the above	2,861	1.26	
Majority		9,118	3.97	
Turnout		229,555	67.57	

=== 2012 ===
2012 Uttar Pradesh Legislative Assembly election: Laharpur
Party	Candidate	Votes	%	±%
BSP	Mohammad Jasmir Ansari	71,860	37.08	−
INC	Anil Kumar Verma	54,188	27.96	−
SP	Zaheer Abbas	46,525	24	−
	Remainder 10 candidates	21,243	10.96	−
Majority		17,672	9.12	−
Turnout		193,816	65.72	−
BSP hold		Swing		

== See also ==
- Sitapur district
- Sitapur Lok Sabha constituency
- Sixteenth Legislative Assembly of Uttar Pradesh
- Uttar Pradesh Legislative Assembly
- Vidhan Bhawan
