= Lal Bihari Yadav (Uttar Pradesh politician) =

Indian politician (born 1960)

Leader of the Opposition in the Uttar Pradesh Legislative Council
- Incumbent
- Assumed office 22 July 2024
- Deputy: Mohammad Jasmir Ansari
- Chairman: Kunwar Manvendra Singh
- Preceded by: Himself
- In office 26 May 2022 – 6 July 2022
- Chairman: Kunwar Manvendra Singh
- Preceded by: Sanjay Lathar
- Succeeded by: Himself

Member of Uttar Pradesh Legislative Council
- Incumbent
- Assumed office 1 December 2020
- Preceded by: Chet Narayan Singh
- Constituency: Varanasi Teachers Authorities

Personal details
- Born: 1 July 1960 (age 66) Azamgarh, Uttar Pradesh, India
- Party: Samajwadi Party
- Children: 2 sons
- Education: B.A, BEd

Lal Bihari Yadav (born 1 July 1960) is an Indian politician from Samajwadi Party who is the 21st Leader of the Opposition in the Uttar Pradesh Legislative Council, Upper House of Uttar Pradesh Legislature since 2024. He succeeded Sanjay Lathar in this position on July 22, 2024.
