= Kathana =

River in Uttar Pradesh, India

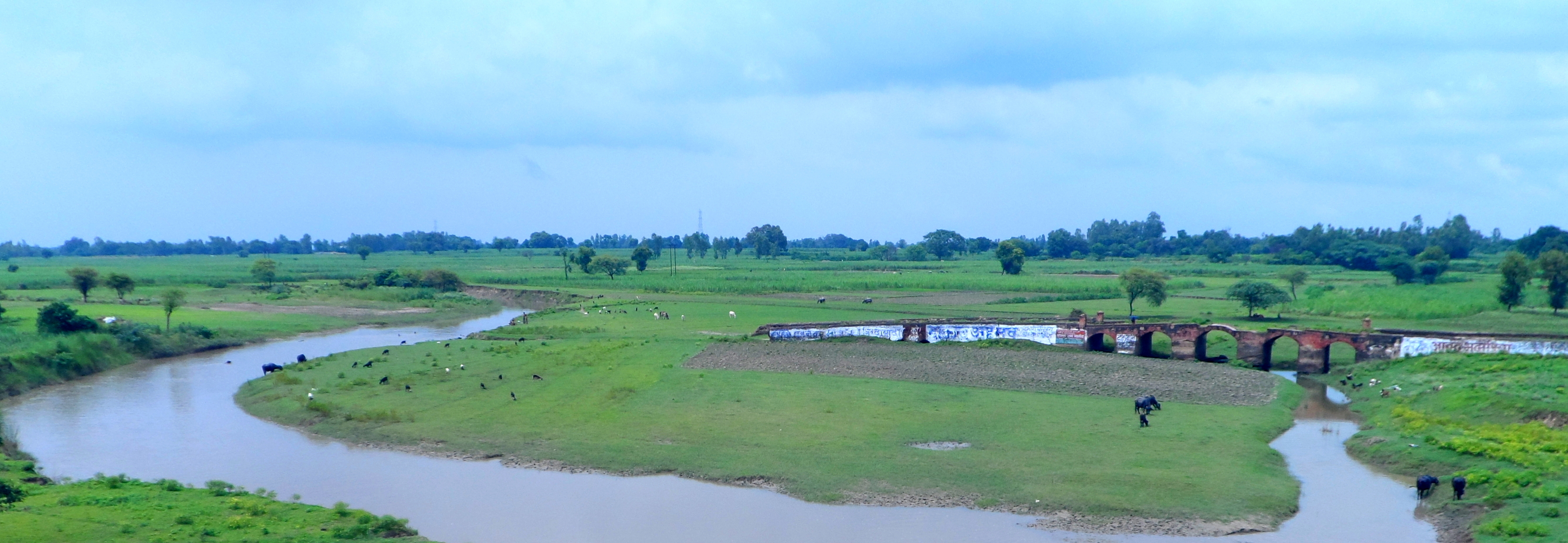
Kathna river in the outskirt of Maholi town.

Kathna or kathna is a small river that joins the left bank of the Gomti River near Dadhnamau village in Sitapur District, Uttar Pradesh, India. It flows in the outskirts of Maholi, a small town along the National Highway 24.

River Kathna rises in Moti Jheel (Lake) near the village of Dhanega (Kuthar) in Shahjahanpur district. After the first 16 kilometers, it enters Kheri district near the town of Mailani. Then it flows to the south and enters Sitapur district at Kalwartal near the town of Maholi. It then flows south in a tortuous course, cutting off pargana Chandra from the rest of the district and joins Gomti River just north of the village of Dadhnamau.

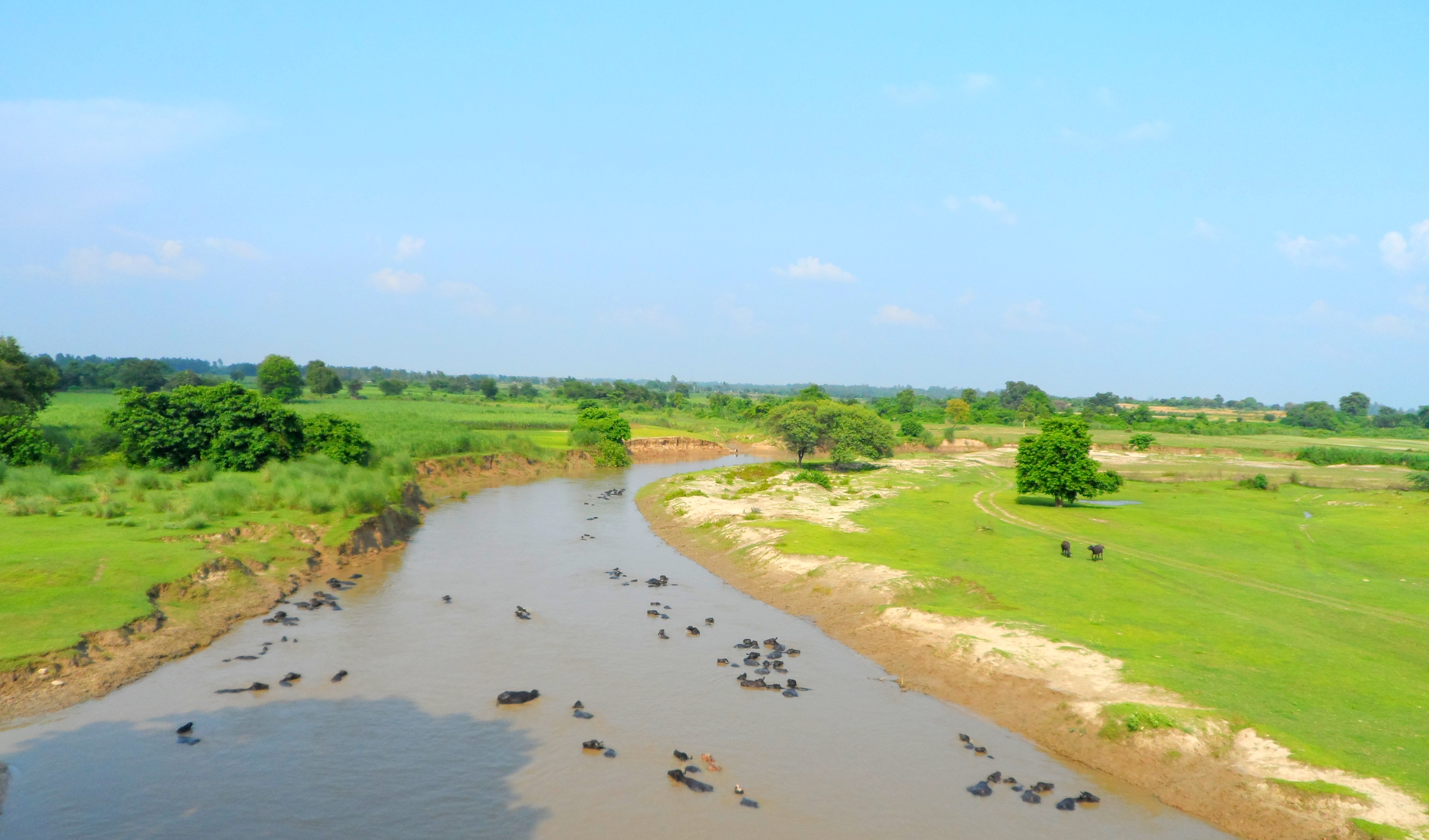
Kathna River near Gursanda, Pisawan

The river is not navigable, and it banks are in places covered with jungle. There is a narrow flood plain along the banks, but the soil is not of very good quality. Beyond the plains, the soil is sandy but better than that in the neighborhood of Gomati. In the middle of Chandra pargana, it gives place to loam, but here the drainage, in palaces, is defective.

The valley of the river is wide, having a fringe of poor flood plain below high banks. Its lower parts are swampy and generally go out of cultivation during a cycle of wet years. The banks of Kathna are high, and therefore the river is hardly used for any irrigation.
