= Sanjay Lathar =

Indian politician

Member of Uttar Pradesh Legislative Council
- In office 2016–2022

Leader of Opposition Uttar Pradesh Legislative Council
- In office 28 March 2022 – 26 May 2022
- Preceded by: Ahmed Hasan
- Succeeded by: Lal Bihari Yadav

Personal details
- Born: 7 July 1971 (age 54)
- Party: Samajwadi Party

Sanjay Lathar (born 7 July 1971) is an Indian politician. He was Leader of the Opposition in Uttar Pradesh Legislative Council from March 2022 to May 2022, after the death of Ahmed Hasan. He is associated with Samajwadi Party. He was Member of the Uttar Pradesh Legislative Council from 2016 to 2022.

== Early life and education ==
Lathar was born on 7 July 1971, to Chaudhary Bhale Ram and Santosh Devi in Budha Khera Lathar, Jind district, Haryana.

Lathar had a certificate of Doctor of Philosophy from the Mahatma Gandhi Kashi Vidhyapeeth.

== Career ==
Lathar has been associated with the Samajwadi Party since 1990. He was elected to Uttar Pradesh Legislative Council in 2016. He became Leader of Opposition in 2022 succeeding Ahmed Hasan.

== Personal life ==
Lathar is married to Dr. Babita Lathar and they have two sons together. Their elder son, Aditya Lathar is the elected president of Durham University Students Union since 2022.
