= List of leaders of the opposition in the Uttar Pradesh Legislative Council =

Leader of the Official Opposition in the Legislative Council of Uttar Pradesh

Leader of the Opposition of Uttar Pradesh Legislative Council
- उत्तर प्रदेश विधान परिषद् के माननीय नेता प्रतिपक्ष / नेता विरोधी दल
- Seal of Uttar Pradesh Government
- Incumbent; Lal Bihari Yadav since 22 July 2024
- Style: The Honourable
- Type: Leader of the Opposition
- Status: Leader of the opposition alliance or the main opposition party which is not in government
- Member of: Uttar Pradesh Legislative Council
- Reports to: Vidhan Parishad
- Residence: Lucknow
- Seat: Vidhan Bhawan, Lucknow
- Nominator: Members of the Official Opposition of the Legislative Council
- Appointer: Chairperson of the Legislative Council
- Term length: 6 years Till the retirement of the member
- Inaugural holder: Kunwar Guru Narayan
- Formation: 30 September 1954; 71 years ago
- Deputy: Mohammad Jasmir Ansari

The leader of the opposition in the Uttar Pradesh Legislative Council is the politician who leads the official opposition in the Uttar Pradesh Legislative Council.

== Eligibility ==
Official Opposition is a term used in Uttar Pradesh Legislative Council to designate the political party which has secured the second largest number of seats in the council. In order to get formal recognition, the party must have at least 10% of total membership of the Legislative Council. A single party has to meet the 10% seat criterion, not an alliance. Many of the Indian state legislatures also follow this 10% rule while the rest prefer single largest opposition party according to the rules of their respective houses.

== Role ==
The opposition's main role is to question the government of the day and hold them accountable to the public. The opposition is equally responsible in upholding the best interests of the people of the country. They have to ensure that the Government does not take any steps, which might have negative effects on the people of the country.

The role of the opposition in legislature is basically to check the excesses of the ruling or dominant party, and not to be totally antagonistic. There are actions of the ruling party which may be beneficial to the masses and opposition is expected to support such steps.

In legislature, opposition party has a major role and must act to discourage the party in power from acting against the interests of the country and the common man. They are expected to alert the population and the Government on the content of any bill, which is not in the best interests of the country.

== List of leaders of the opposition of Uttar Pradesh ==
No	Portrait	Name	Constituency	Tenure			Party
1		Kunwar Guru Narayan		30 September 1954	17 May 1959	4 years, 229 days	Progressive Parliament
2		Abdul Jaleel Faridi		12 August 1959	28 March 1960	229 days	Praja Socialist Party
Vacant since no opposition party had 10% seats				28 March 1960	14 April 1967	7 years, 17 days	N/A
3		Hukum Singh Visen		14 April 1967	17 April 1971	4 years, 3 days	Indian National Congress
4		Kailash Prakash		3 January 1972			Indian National Congress (O)
5		Ram Gopal		20 June 1974	8 August 1974	49 days	Bharatiya Kranti Dal
6		Brahm Dutt		14 January 1975	18 February 1975	35 days	Bharatiya Kranti Dal
7		Gauri Shankar Rai		18 February 1975			Bharatiya Kranti Dal
(6)		Brahm Dutt		30 March 1976	4 February 1977	311 days	Bharatiya Lok Dal
8		Harikishan Srivastva		17 March 1977	11 July 1977	116 days	Bharatiya Lok Dal
(6)		Brahm Dutt		12 July 1977	5 May 1980	2 years, 298 days	Indian National Congress (I)
9		Mahipal Shastri		3 July 1980	26 April 1982	1 year, 297 days	Lokdal
10		Mulayam Singh Yadav		26 June 1982	8 November 1984	2 years, 135 days	Lokdal
Vacant since no opposition party had 10% seats				8 November 1984	13 June 1990	5 years, 217 days	N/A
11		Ammar Rizvi		13 June 1990	6 July 1992	2 years, 23 days	Indian National Congress
12		Sushila Rohatgi		27 July 1992	5 May 1994	1 year, 282 days	Indian National Congress
13		Maharani Dohre		23 August 1994	2 June 1995	283 days	Indian National Congress
14		Rama Shankar Kaushik		3 June 1995	6 March 1996	277 days	Samajwadi Party
15		Om Prakash Sharma	Meerut Teachers	25 April 1997	22 January 1998	272 days	Independent
16		Ahmed Hasan (politician)	MLA's	23 January 1998	29 August 2003	5 years, 218 days	Samajwadi Party
17		Naipal Singh	Bareilly–Moradabad Graduates	3 September 2003	19 May 2007	3 years, 258 days	Bharatiya Janata Party
18		Ahmed Hasan	MLA's	19 May 2007	16 March 2012	4 years, 302 days	Samajwadi Party
19		Nasimuddin Siddiqui	MLA's	16 March 2012	28 March 2017	5 years, 12 days	Bahujan Samaj Party
(16)		Ahmed Hasan	MLA's	28 March 2017	20 February 2022	4 years, 329 days	Samajwadi Party
20		Sanjay Lathar	Nominated	28 March 2022	26 May 2022	59 days	Samajwadi Party
21		Lal Bihari Yadav	Varanasi Teachers	26 May 2022	6 July 2022	41 days	Samajwadi Party
Vacant since no opposition party has 10% seats				6 July 2022	22 July 2024	2 years, 16 days	N/A
(21)		Lal Bihari Yadav	Varanasi Teachers	22 July 2024	present	2 years, 47 days	Samajwadi Party
