= Biswan =

- Town
- Location in Uttar Pradesh, India
- Coordinates: 27°29′36″N 80°59′47″E
- Country: India
- State: Uttar Pradesh
- District: Sitapur
- Established: About 1350 AD

Population (2011)
  - Total: 55,780

Languages
  - Official: Hindi
- Time zone: UTC+5:30 (IST)
- PIN: 261201
- Telephone code: 05863
- Vehicle registration: UP-34

Biswan is a town and a municipal board in Sitapur district in the state of Uttar Pradesh, India.

== Geography ==
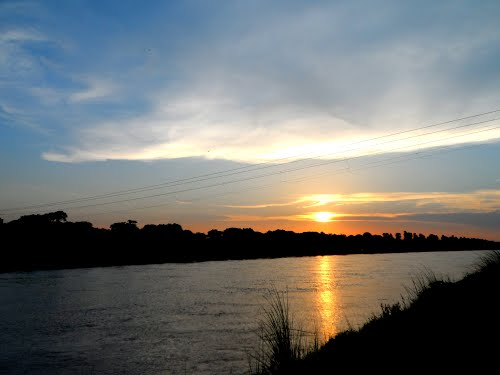
Sharda Canal near Biswan

Biswan is located at 27.5°N 81.0°E. It has an average elevation of 133 metres (436 ft). The twin Sharda Canals flow across the outskirts of the town.

== History ==
In approximately the 15th century, Biswan was founded and named for Bishwar, a yogi belonging to Baba Vishwanatha Nath. Shekhbari was responsible for numerous buildings in the community including mosques and dargahs. An annual Urs/Mela is conducted in Biswan at Gulzaar Shah Baba mazar. In 19th Century, Rai Midhai Lal Saxena of RaiZada Kayastha Family of Maharajganj - Dharmpur Estate played an important role in development of the region.

== Demographics ==
As per Census of India, 2011, the town has a population of 55,780 of which 29,059 are males while 26,721 are females. Male literacy is around 75.30% while female literacy rate is 66.97%.

=== Religion ===
The town population was predominantly Hindu when the town was founded in 14th century. During Muslim rule in following centuries, this town grew in size mainly by Muslim immigration. In 1881, the total population was 8148, of whom 56.5% were Hindus and 43.2% were Muslims. As of 2011, Muslims make up 53.98% where Hindus are 44.91%.
