= Hargaon =

- Town
- Location in Uttar Pradesh, India
- Coordinates: 27°46′N 80°44′E
- Country: India
- State: Uttar Pradesh
- District: Sitapur

Population (2011)
  - Total: 20,920

Languages
  - Official: Hindi
- Time zone: UTC+5:30 (IST)

Hargaon is a town and a nagar panchayat in Sitapur district in the Indian state of Uttar Pradesh.

== Demographics ==
As of 2001 India census, Hargaon had a population of 20,920. Males constitute 53% of the population and females 47%. Hargaon has an average literacy rate of 56%, lower than the national average of 59.5%: male literacy is 64%, and female literacy is 48%. In Hargaon, 18% of the population is under 6 years of age.

Religions in hargaon
Religion	Percent
Hindus	73%
Muslims	26%
Jains	0.5%
Others†	0.5%
Distribution of religions †Includes Sikhs (0.7%), Buddhists (<0.2%).

== Schools ==
Hargaon has multiple schools. The oldest are Birla Vidya Mandir Primary School, Birla Vidya Mandir Inter College (since 1955), Junior High School and Girls Junior High School. Both Birla Vidya Mandir schools are run by Birla Sugar Factory management while other junior high schools are run by the state government. Recently three more schools that have been making waves are Green Field Academy, Gurudwara School, Gurunanak Inter college and Democratic Educational Society, Rajisthali Public school.

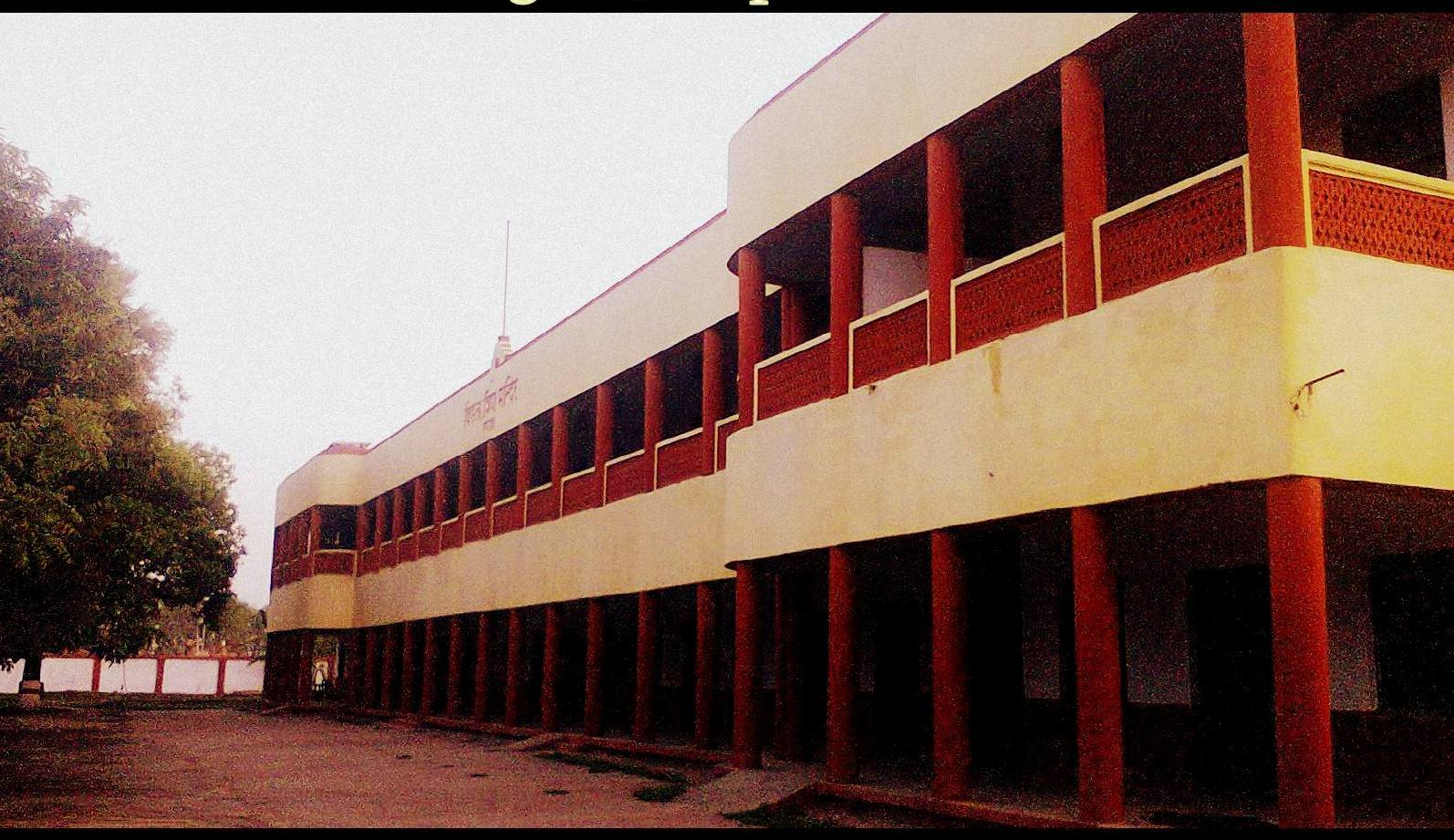
Birla Vidya Mandir Inter college

== Temples ==
In the town there are many old temples. One of the oldest temple known as "Teerth". Another temple is Laxmi Narayan Mandir run by Birla Sugar Factory management.

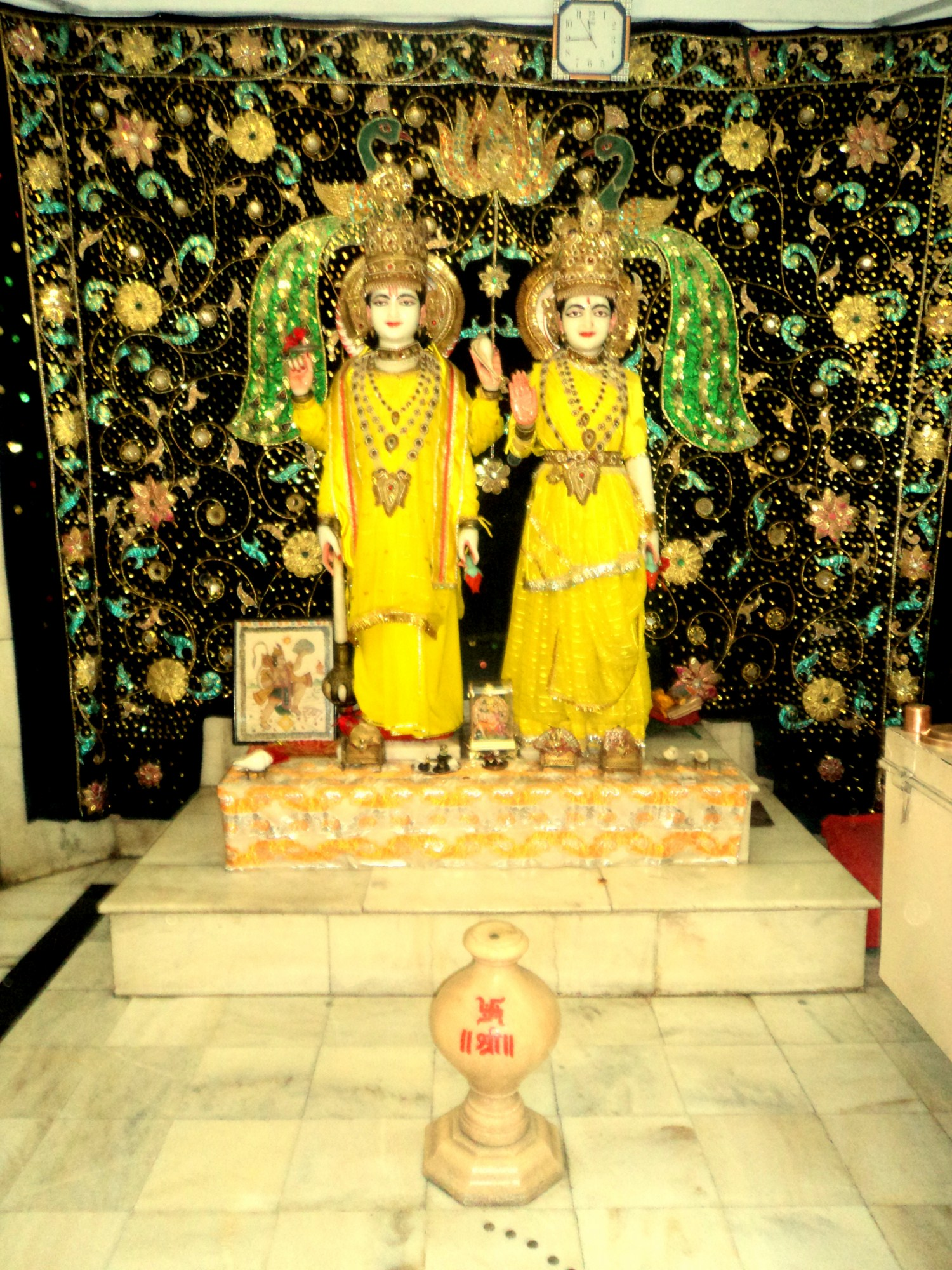
Laxmi Narayan Mandir

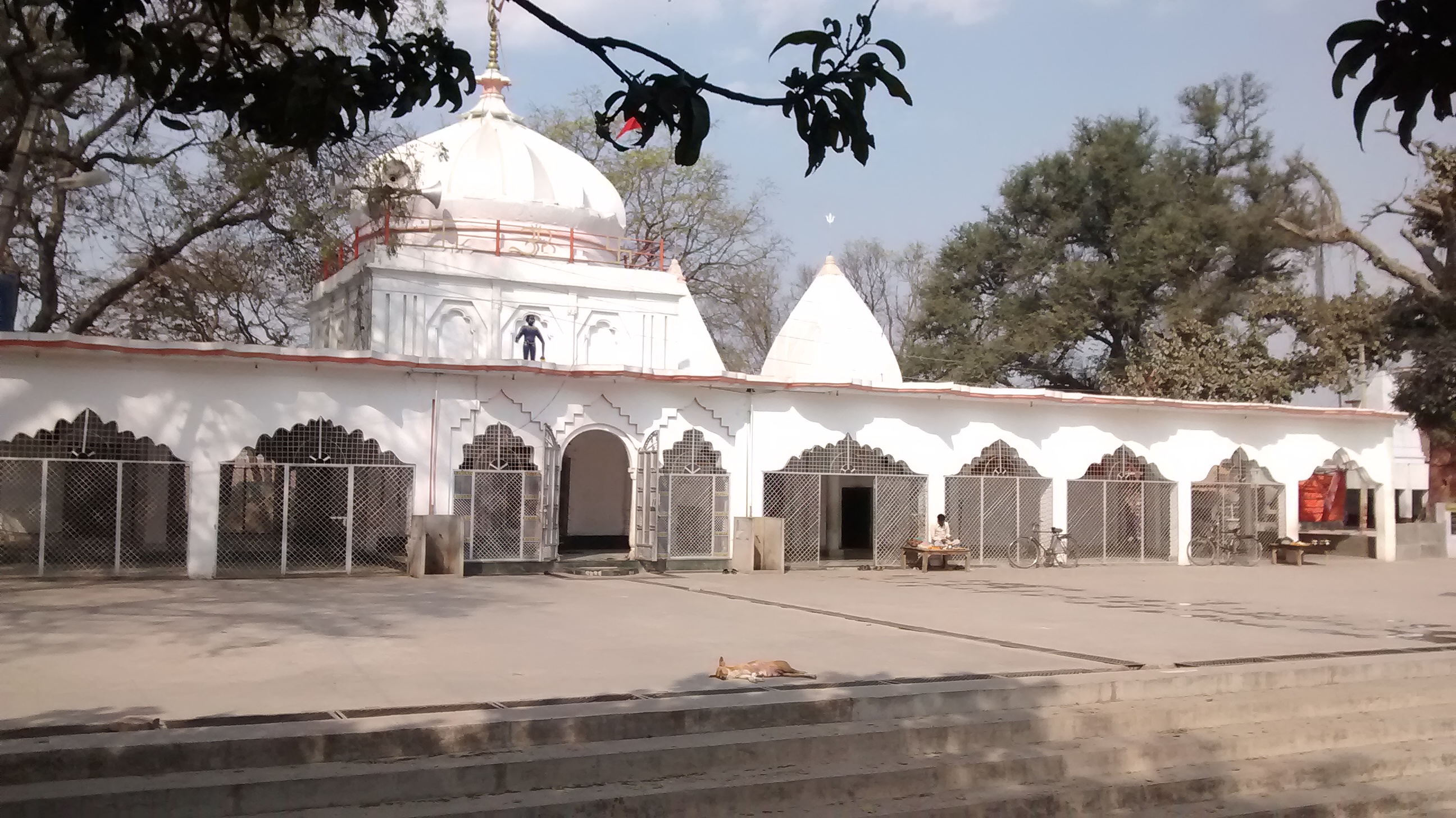
Hargaon Teerth-shiv temple

== History ==
The city was ruled by local Zamidar Of Afgava A Zamindari Of 21 Villages Kalika Prasad Awasthi And Parmeshwar Din Awasthi In 20 th Century Also A Freedom Fighter But India Become Near To Independ British seized the estate's Treasury Near 15 Lakhs They First Attacked On15 June 1946 At 9:00 Am But The Kothar Was Saved By Servants And Some Soldier Mens Who Had Loyalist But In The Second Day Of Battle British Under Brigadier Chris Campbell Launch An Early Attack At 6:00 Am An Army Of 150 Infantry And 50 Cavalery Moved Towards North Haragaon Destroyed The Army Of Zamindar Approx 70 Infantry At The Kothar But Family Of Zamindar Was Safe And Moved To Lakhimpur And British Looted Treasury And Villages And Go Back To England Zamindar And Brother Also Fought Against The British For Independence After Independence India Abolished The Zamindari His Son Was Pyare Lal Awasthi A Jila VidyLaya Nirakshak And Desecandats Now Live In Lakhimpur, The Ruins of the Kothar Still Watch In Afgava. But Pyare Lal Awasthi Was Known as one who participated in the Indian movement for Independence in Afgava forgave for his braveness.
