= Biswan Assembly constituency =

Constituency of the Uttar Pradesh legislative assembly in India

Biswan
- Constituency No. 149 for the Uttar Pradesh Legislative Assembly

Constituency details
- Country: India
- Region: North India
- State: Uttar Pradesh
- District: Sitapur
- Total electors: 286,793 (2012)
- Reservation: None

Member of Legislative Assembly
- 18th Uttar Pradesh Legislative Assembly
- Incumbent Nirmal Verma
- Party: BJP
- Elected year: 1956

Biswan Assembly constituency is one of the 403 constituencies of the Uttar Pradesh Legislative Assembly, India. It is a part of the Sitapur district and one of the five assembly constituencies in the Sitapur Lok Sabha constituency. First election in this assembly constituency was held in 1957 after the "DPACO (1956)" (delimitation order) was passed in 1956. After the "Delimitation of Parliamentary and Assembly Constituencies Order" was passed in 2008, the constituency was assigned identification number 149.

== Wards and areas ==
Extent of Biswan Assembly constituency is KCs Biswan, Manpur, PCs Ahamdabad, Kankarkui, Kauwakhera, Aruwa, Konsar, Kotra, Gurera, Tedawakalan, Nakaila, Belwa Basahia, Puraini, Bagahadhak, Murthana, Lalpur, Sukhawa Kala, Sanda of Jahangirabad KC & Biswan MB of Biswan Tehsil; PCs Saraiyan, Patara Kalan, Daudpur, Mahotepur, Maholi, Lalawa, Saraurakala & Bhithauli of Peer Nagar KC of Sidhauli Tehsil.

== Members of the Legislative Assembly ==
| # | Term | Name | Party | From | To | Days | Comments | Ref |
|---|---|---|---|---|---|---|---|---|
| 01 | 01st Vidhan Sabha | - | - | Mar-1952 | Mar-1957 | 1,849 | Constituency not in existence | |
| 02 | 02nd Vidhan Sabha | Ganeshi Lal | Indian National Congress | Apr-1957 | Mar-1962 | 1,800 | - | |
| 02 | 02nd Vidhan Sabha | Suresh Prakash Singh | Indian National Congress | Apr-1957 | Mar-1962 | 1,800 | - | |
| 03 | 03rd Vidhan Sabha | Gaya Prasad Mehrotra | Bharatiya Jana Sangh | Mar-1962 | Mar-1967 | 1,828 | - | |
| 04 | 04th Vidhan Sabha | Gaya Prasad Mehrotra | Bharatiya Jana Sangh | Mar-1967 | Apr-1968 | 402 | - | |
| 05 | 05th Vidhan Sabha | Kripal Dayal | Indian National Congress | Feb-1969 | Mar-1974 | 1,832 | - | |
| 06 | 06th Vidhan Sabha | Gaya Prasad Mehrotra | Bharatiya Jana Sangh | Mar-1974 | Apr-1977 | 1,153 | - | |
| 07 | 07th Vidhan Sabha | Gaya Prasad Mehrotra | Janata Party | Jun-1977 | Feb-1980 | 969 | - | |
| 08 | 08th Vidhan Sabha | Ram Kumar Bhargava | Indian National Congress (I) | Jun-1980 | Mar-1985 | 1,735 | - | |
| 09 | 09th Vidhan Sabha | Padma Seth | Indian National Congress | Mar-1985 | Nov-1989 | 1,725 | - | |
| 10 | 10th Vidhan Sabha | Padma Seth | Indian National Congress | Dec-1989 | Apr-1991 | 488 | - | |
| 11 | 11th Vidhan Sabha | Padma Seth | Indian National Congress | Jun-1991 | Dec-1992 | 533 | - | |
| 12 | 12th Vidhan Sabha | Sunder Pal Singh | Samajwadi Party | Dec-1993 | Oct-1995 | 693 | - | |
| 13 | 13th Vidhan Sabha | Ajit Kumar Mehrotra | Bharatiya Janata Party | Oct-1996 | May-2002 | 1,967 | - | |
| 14 | 14th Vidhan Sabha | Rampal Yadav | Samajwadi Party | Feb-2002 | May-2007 | 1,902 | - | |
| 15 | 15th Vidhan Sabha | Nirmal Verma | Bahujan Samaj Party | May-2007 | Mar-2012 | 1,762 | - | |
| 16 | 16th Vidhan Sabha | Rampal Yadav | Samajwadi Party | Mar-2012 | Mar-2017 | - | - | |
| 17 | 17th Vidhan Sabha | Mahendra Singh yadav | Bharatiya Janata Party | Mar-2017 | Mar-2022 | | | |
| 18 | 18th Vidhan Sabha | Nirmal Verma | Bharatiya Janata Party | Mar-2022 | Incumbent | | | |

== Election results ==
=== 2027 ===
2027 Uttar Pradesh Legislative Assembly election: Biswan
| Party | Candidate | Votes | % | ±% |
|---|---|---|---|---|
| INDIA | | | | |
| NDA | | | | |
| BSP | | | | |
| NOTA | None of the above | | | |
| Majority | | | | |
| Turnout | | | | |
| gain from | | Swing | | |

=== 2022 ===
2022 Uttar Pradesh Legislative Assembly Election: Biswan
| Party | Candidate | Votes | % | ±% |
|---|---|---|---|---|
| BJP | Nirmal Verma | 106,014 | 44.77 | +8.85 |
| SP | Afzaal Kausar | 95,536 | 40.35 | +8.92 |
| BSP | Hashim Ali | 24,086 | 10.17 | −18.35 |
| INC | Vandana Bharrgava | 4,665 | 1.97 | |
| NOTA | None of the above | 1,581 | 0.67 | −0.25 |
| Majority | | 10,478 | 4.42 | −0.07 |
| Turnout | | 236,786 | 70.1 | −1.8 |
| BJP hold | | Swing | | |

=== 2017 ===
2017 Uttar Pradesh Legislative Assembly Election: Biswan
| Party | Candidate | Votes | % | ±% |
|---|---|---|---|---|
| BJP | Mahendra Singh | 81,907 | 35.92 | |
| SP | Afzaal Kausar | 71,672 | 31.43 | |
| BSP | Nirmal Verma | 65,040 | 28.52 | |
| NOTA | None of the above | 2,080 | 0.92 | |
| Majority | | 10,235 | 4.49 | |
| Turnout | | 228,054 | 71.9 | |

=== 2012 ===
2012 General Elections: Biswan
| Party | Candidate | Votes | % | ±% |
|---|---|---|---|---|
| SP | Rampal Yadav | 74,441 | 38.19 | − |
| BSP | Nirmal Verma | 67,092 | 34.42 | − |
| INC | Vijay Shanker Misra | 21,886 | 11.23 | − |
| | Remainder 13 candidates | 31,484 | 16.17 | − |
| Majority | | 7,349 | 3.77 | − |
| Turnout | | 194,903 | 67.96 | − |
| SP gain from BSP | | Swing | | |

== See also ==
- Sitapur district
- Sitapur Lok Sabha constituency
- Sixteenth Legislative Assembly of Uttar Pradesh
- Uttar Pradesh Legislative Assembly
- Vidhan Bhawan
