= Sidhauli =

- Town
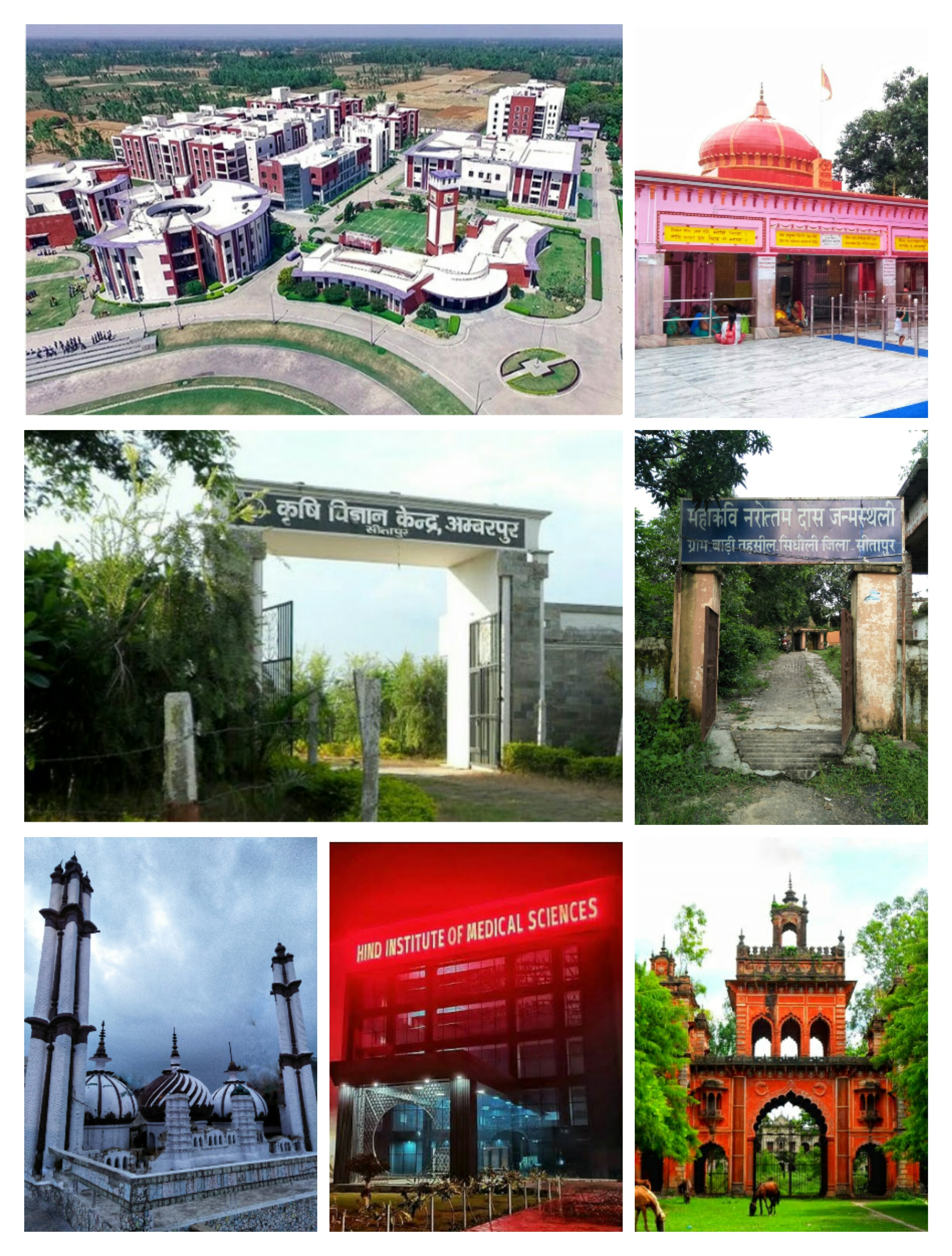
- (Clockwise from top) Vidyagyan, Siddheshwer Mandir, Narottamdas Birth Place, Kasmanda State Quila, Hind Hospital, Jama Mosque, Krishi Vigyan Kendra.

- Location of Sidhauli in Uttar Pradesh, India Sidhauli (India)
- Coordinates: 27.28°N 80.83°E
- Country: India
- State: Uttar Pradesh
- District: Sitapur
- Founder: Ancient Village On The Name of Lord Shiva
- Named for: Siddho Ki Awali

Government
  - Type: Ideal Nagar Panchyat

Area
  - Total: 12 km^{2} (4.6 sq mi)
- Elevation: 136 m (446 ft)

Population (2011)
  - Total: 24,976
  - Density: 2,100/km^{2} (5,400/sq mi)

Languages
  - Official: Hindi, Awadhi
- Time zone: UTC+5:30 (IST)
- PIN: 261303
- Telephone code: 05864
- Vehicle registration: UP-34
- Website: http://www.sitapur.nic.in/

Sidhauli is a town and an Ideal Notified Area Council (Nagar Panchayat) in Sitapur district in the Indian state of Uttar Pradesh. It comes under Lucknow division and is in the Awadh region of eastern Uttar Pradesh. Four-lane National Highway 24 passes from the centre of the town. It comes under Mohanlalganj (Lok Sabha constituency). Sidhauli is also a Sidhauli (Assembly constituency) of Uttar Pradesh Legislative Assembly. It is the Headquarters of Tehsil Sidhauli and Sidhauli Community Development Block. Sidhauli Block comprises 306 Gram Panchayats.

== Geography ==
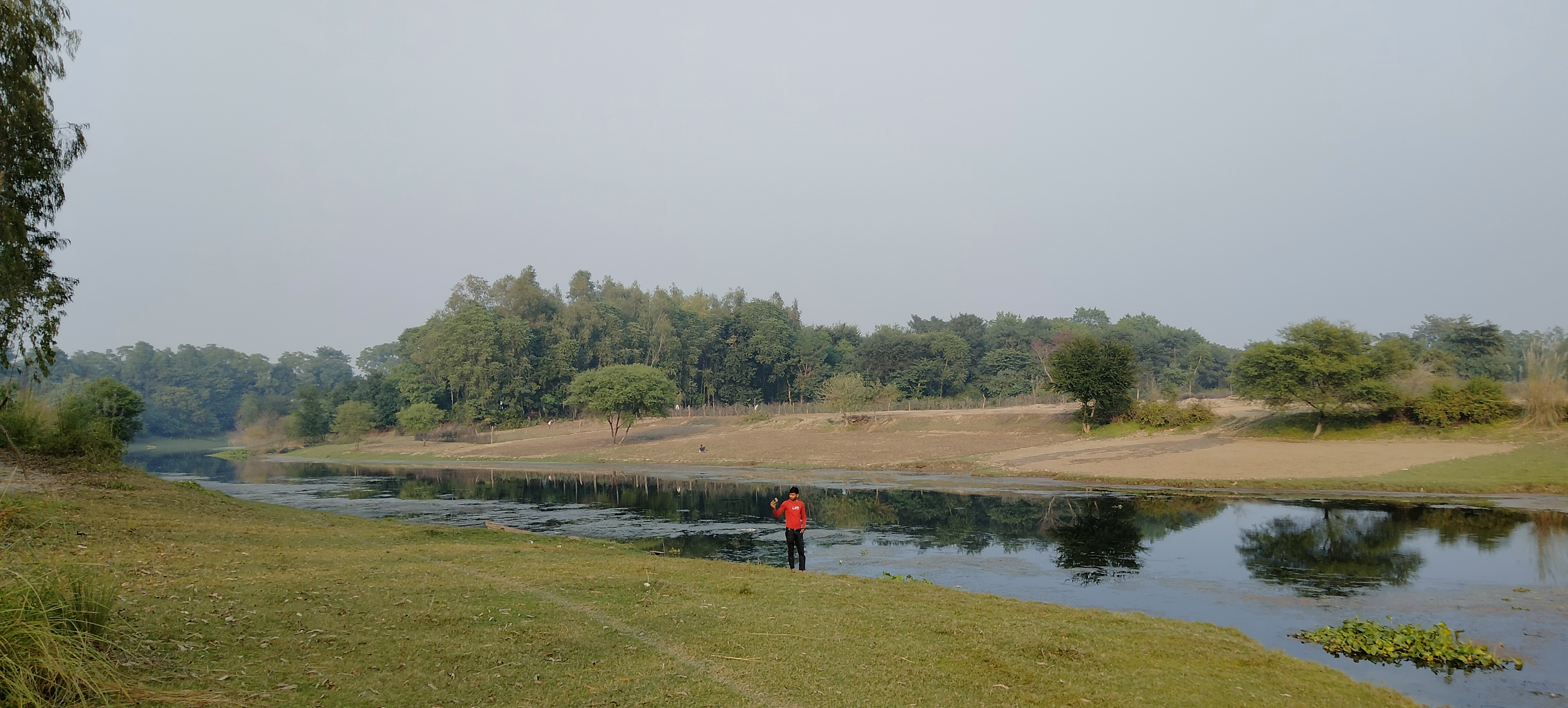
Sarayan River at Hindaura Village, Sidhauli

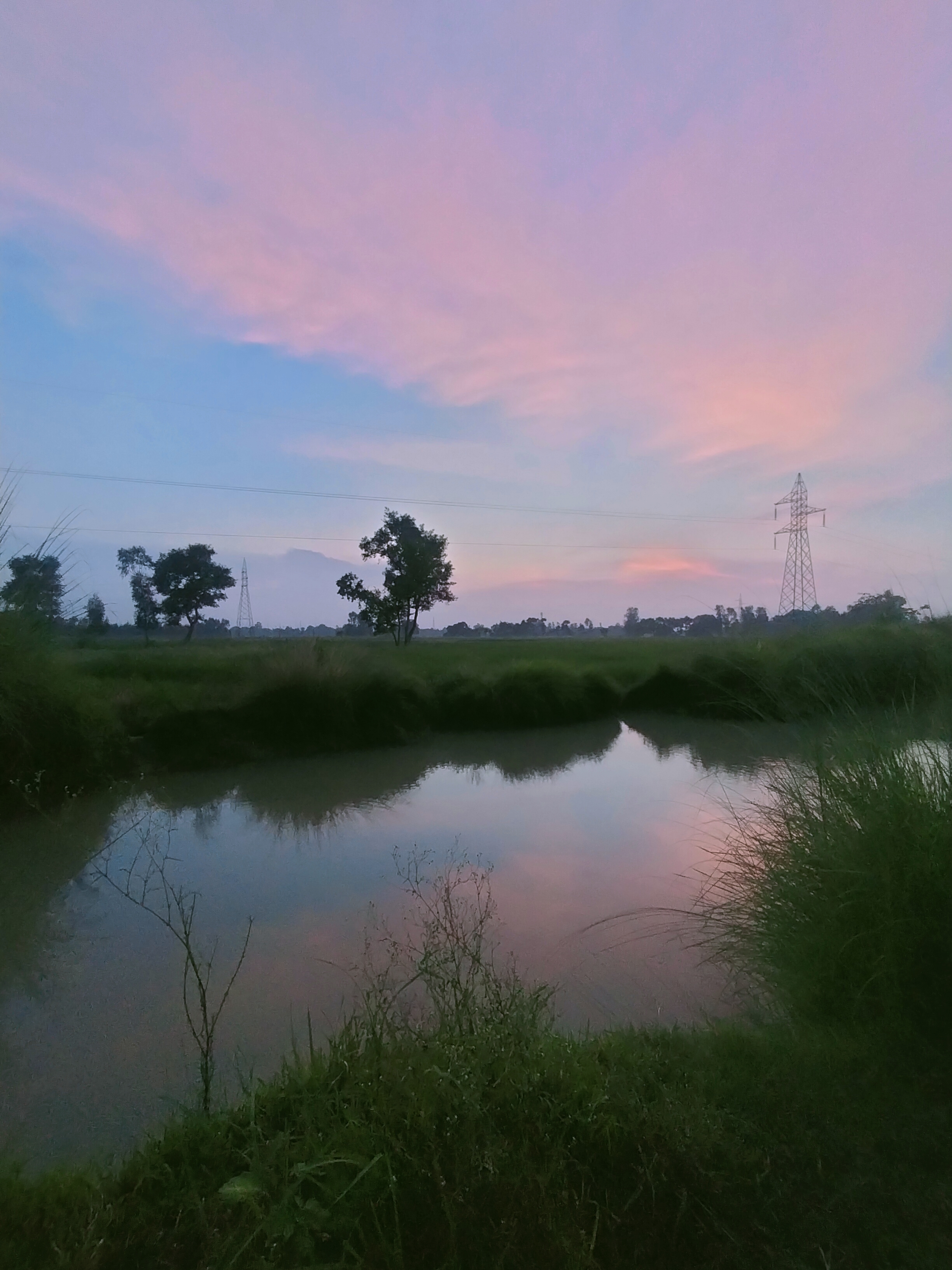
Irrigation System at Sidhauli

Sidhauli has an average elevation of 138 metres (452 feet). The relief of the town is entirely flat, as are most other towns in the Ganges valley. There exists no prominent geomorphic feature. The river Sarayan, which meets the river Gomati further on, flows at distance of about 5 kilometres from the town. Because the town is located on alluvial soil, the water table in this region rarely falls below 50 feet. The town receives most of its rainfall during the South-West Monsoon. During the monsoon, the water table rises to 25–30 feet.

== Demographics ==
As of 2011, according to the Indian census, Sidhauli had a population of 24,976. Males constitute 52.98% of the population and females 47.01%. Sidhauli has an average literacy rate of 53.63%, lower than the national average of 74.04%: male literacy is 62.14%, and female literacy is only 44.04%. In Sidhauli, 16.34% of the population is under 6 years of age.

== Notable people ==
- Ashok Kumar Rawat (Sansad), Parliament MP
- Anju Bala (Poorv Sansad), Former Parliament MP
- Ramkrishna Bhargava (Vidhayak), Assembly MLA
- Manish Rawat (Vidhayak), Assembly MLA
- Hargovind Bhargava

== Photo Gallery ==
Ram Darbar Siddheshwer Temple

Kamlapur Kasmanda Quila

Mahatma Gandhi Statue Sidhauli

Kasmanda Quila Kamlapur

Vidhya Gyan School Suraicha

Ancient Siddheshwer Temple
