= Laharpur =

- Town
- Motto: Spread goodness
- Location in Uttar Pradesh, India
- Coordinates: 27.72°N 80.9°E
- Country: India
- State: Uttar Pradesh
- District: Sitapur
- Founder: Firuz Shah Tughlaq
- Elevation: 133 m (436 ft)

Population (2023)
  - Total: 84,000

Languages
  - Official: Hindi, Urdu
- Time zone: UTC+5:30 (IST)
- PIN: 261135

Laharpur is a town, tehsil headquarter and a municipal board in Sitapur district in the Indian state of Uttar Pradesh.

== History ==
The foundation of this town was laid by Emperor Firoz Shah Tughlaq (1351–1388 AD) in 1370 AD, while he was on his way to the shrine of Saiyyad Salar Masud Ghazi at Baharaich. At that time, he settled in some Kayastha and Muslim families. Around 1400, a local Hindu (Pasi) strongman, Lahori Pasi, took possession of it and changed its name from Tuglaqpur to Lahoripur, which became Laharpur due to usage. His descendants remained in possession of Laharpur for another 18 years or so. They were exterminated by a Muslim commander, Sheikh Tahir Gazi of Kannauj in 1418 AD. The town became an important urban center when Raja Todarmal, the finance minister of Emperor Akbar, reconstituted a new pargana of 765 villages with its administrative center at the town of Laharpur. Muslims ruled the town until the death of Mughal Emperor Aurangzeb in 1707, when, taking advantage of widespread anarchy across Mughal Empire, a local Gaur commander, Raja Chandar Sen invaded Sitapur in 1707. Since then, it remained under the control local Gaur Kshatriyas until 1858 when it came under the rule of British Crown.

== Geography ==
Laharpur is located at 27.72°N 80.9°E. It has an average elevation of 133 metres (436 feet).

== Demographics ==
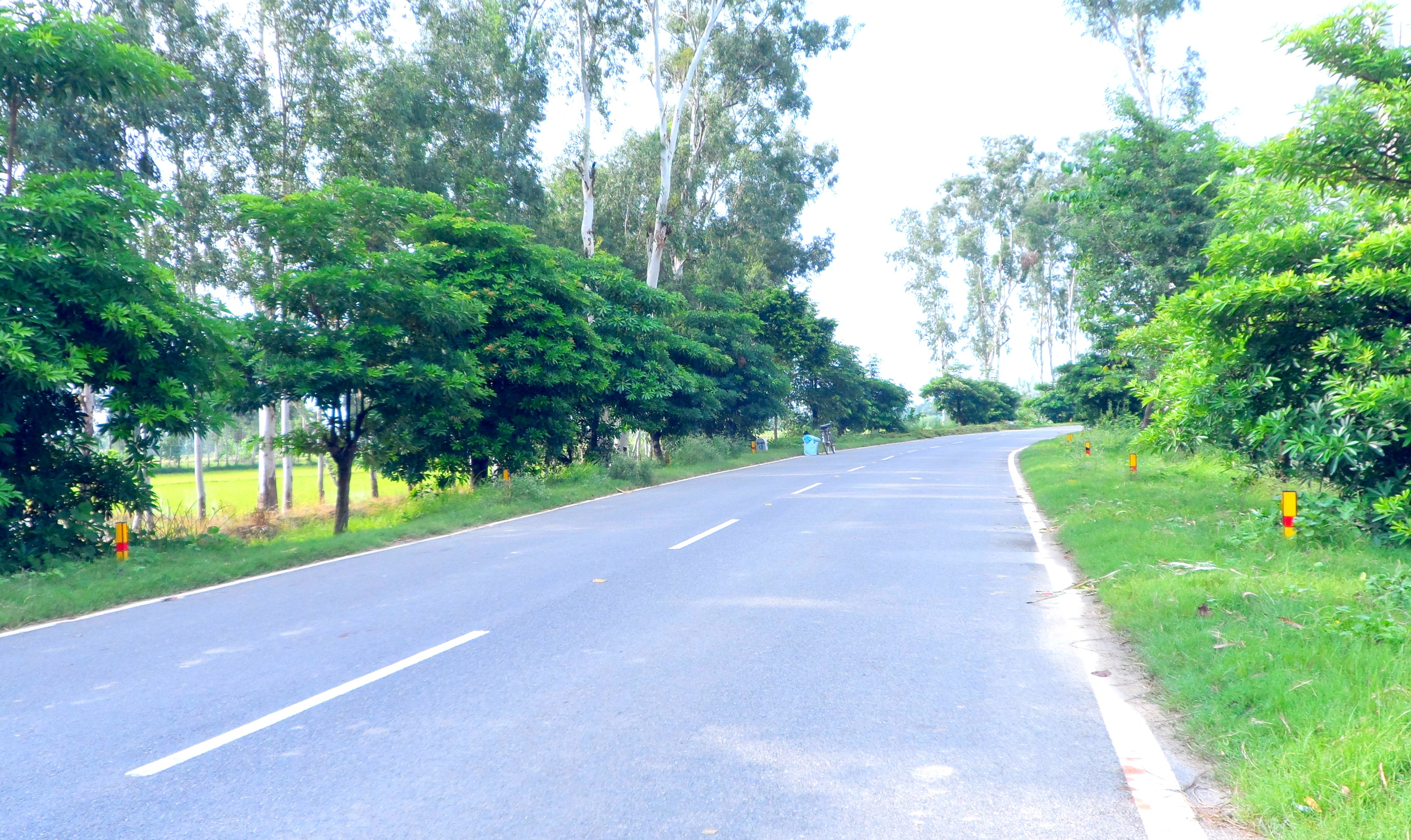
Major District Road (MDR) connecting Sitapur and Laharpur

As of 2011 India census, the town is home to 50,080 souls. Males constitute 52% of the population and females 48%.The sex ratio of Laharpur Tehsil is 896, which means that for every 1,000 men, there are 896 women.

It has an average literacy rate of 60.49%.Male literacy is 64.89%, and female literacy is 55.83%. About 19% of the population in town is under 6 years of age.

== Economic activities ==
The core business used to be weaving by local artisans mostly belonging to Muslim community but due to high cost of raw material and higher labor cost, this artisan based craft is on the verge of extinction. Laharpur used to be a hub of weaving and Zardozi work in past. However, in present the main businesses in Laharpur are timber and leather work.

== Religious places ==
It is famous for being the seat of Qalandaria Order of Sufism and the Dargah of saints Shah Alauddin Ahmad Chirminaposh Suharwardi, Shah Abdul Rahman Jaanbaaz Qalandar and Shah Maja Qalandar.
