= Maholi =

- Town
- Location in Uttar Pradesh, India
- Coordinates: 27.67°N 80.47°E
- Country: India
- State: Uttar Pradesh
- District: Sitapur
- Elevation: 144 m (472 ft)

Population (2011)
  - Total: 21,331

Languages
  - Official: Hindi
- Time zone: UTC+5:30 (IST)
- PIN Code: 261141

Maholi is a town and a nagar panchayat in Sitapur district in the Indian state of Uttar Pradesh. It is now one of the 7 Tehsils in District Sitapur being carved out in 2013 from Misrikh.This was the chief seat of Rajpasis.The most powerful ruler was Raja Hansa Pasi.

== Geography ==
Maholi is located at 27.67°N 80.47°E. It has an average elevation of 144 metres (472 feet). The town is located on the left bank of River Kathna. It is about 24 km from its District city Sitapur, 110 km from Lucknow (the capital of Uttar Pradesh) and 390 km from Delhi (the capital of India). It is well connected by road and railway. It is situated on the National Highway Number 24 (G. T. Road) connecting Lucknow to Delhi. The highway is now a four-lane highway.

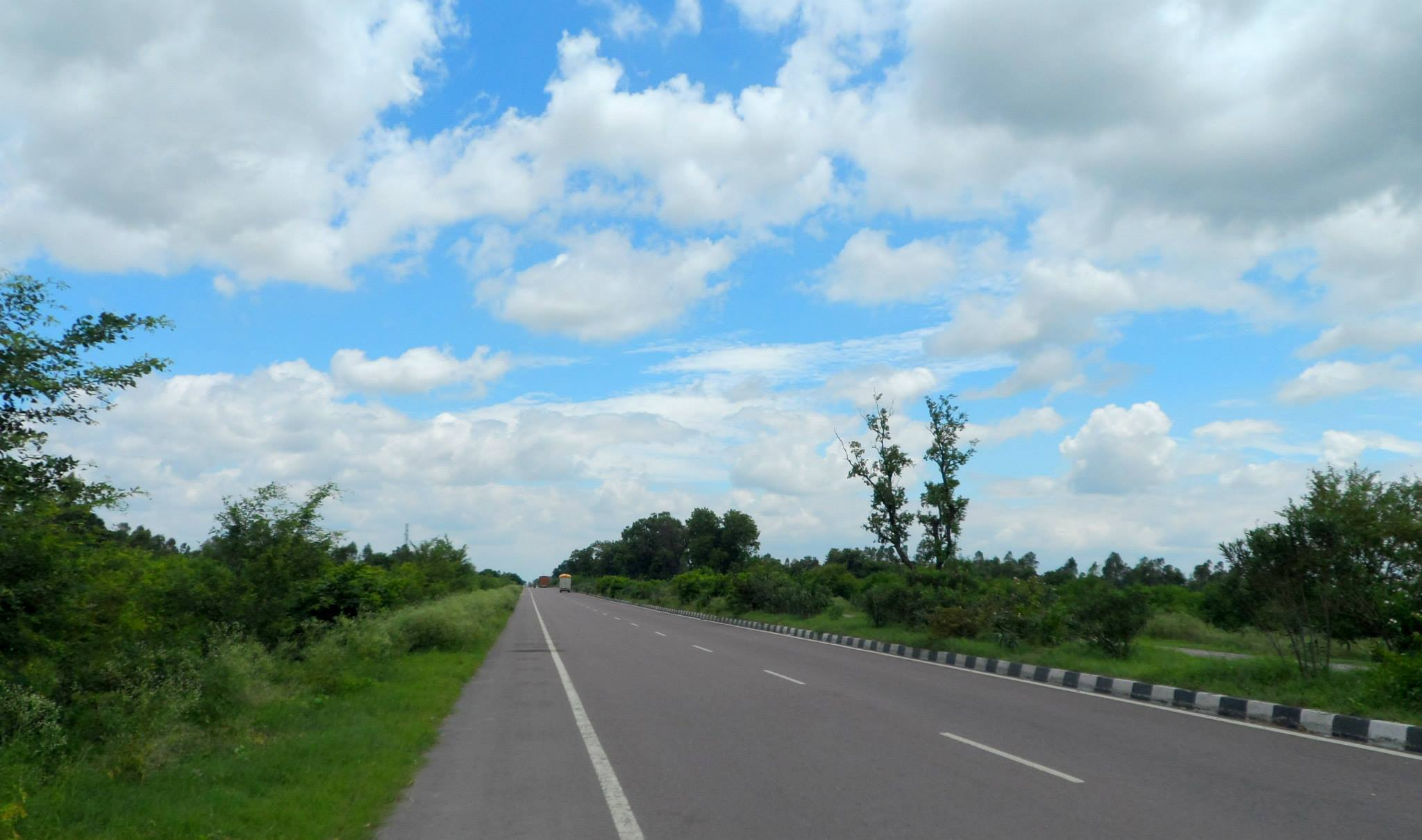
Lucknow-Delhi National Highway-24

== Demographics ==
As of 2011 India census, Maholi had a population of 21,331. Males constitute 52.4% of the population and females 47.6%. Maholi has an average literacy rate of 69%, lower than the national average of 74.04%: male literacy is 74%, and female literacy is 63.5%. In Maholi, 13% of the population is under 6 years of age.

== Places ==
The town has few places to visit. Baba Baijnath Temple, Santoshi Mata and Baba Tekeshwarnath Temple are situated at the west end of Maholi at the bank of the river Kathna. The locally famous Baba Karedev Temple is about 3.0 km from Maholi towards Delhi on the bank of the river Kathna, which is also used for picnicking. The natural river front of the river Kathna near Baba Baijnath Temple is also very beautiful and scenic. In the rainy season peacocks may be seen dancing there.

The city market serves Maholi and local villages, offering goods of all kinds.

There are four intermediate colleges and two degree colleges in the town. Sarswati Vidya Mandir Inter College, Uma Shankar Inter College, Krishak Inter College and Radhakrishana-Satyaprabha Siksha Sansthan are intermediate colleges, and Kedarnath Patel Mahavidyalay Lalpur Sikatiha Maholi Sitapur provides B.A. and B.Sc. degrees. Dayashankar Mahavidyalaya degree college also provides provides B.Sc. and B.A. degrees.

== Hospitals ==
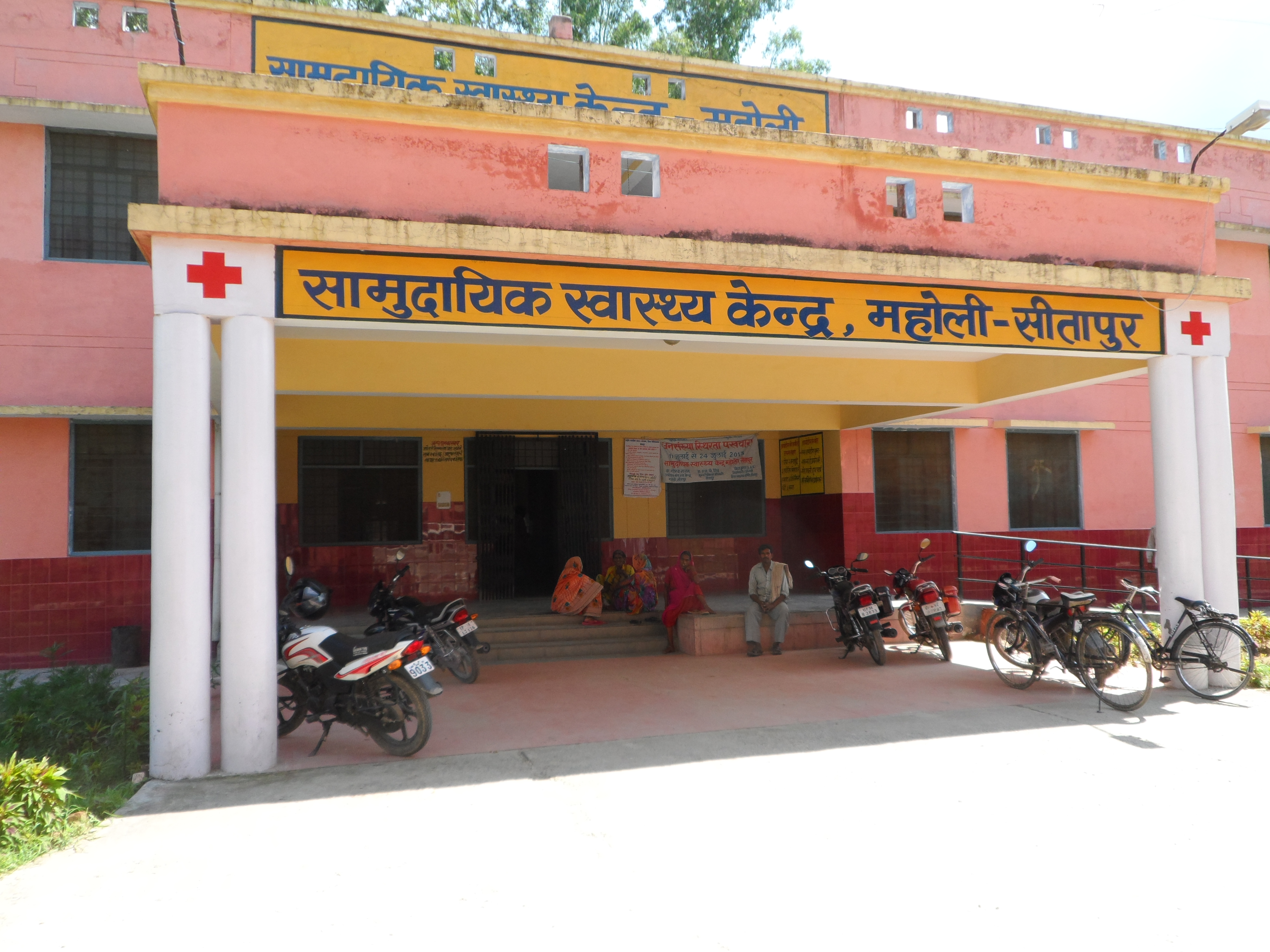
Community Health Centre

The town has a government hospital. Recently, it has been upgraded to a Community Health Centre.

In addition to that this town has many Private Doctors clinic and Nursing Homes also available.
