= Sitapur district =

- District of Uttar Pradesh
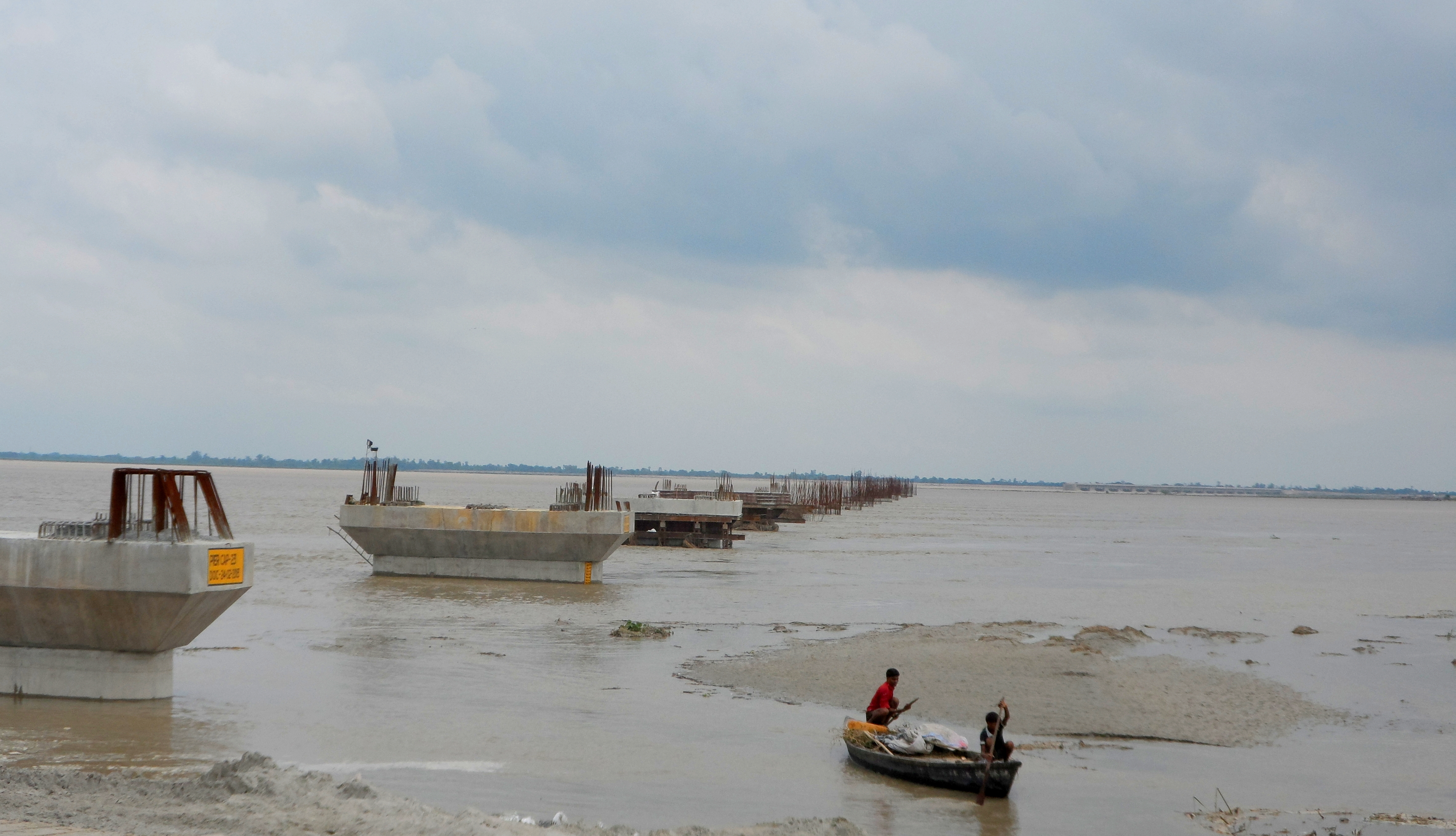
- Ghaghra River in Sitapur district

- Location of Sitapur district in Uttar Pradesh
- Country: India
- State: Uttar Pradesh
- Division: Lucknow
- Headquarters: Sitapur
- Tehsils: 1.Sitapur 2.Biswan 3.Misrikh 4.Maholi 5.Laharpur 6.Mahmudabad 7.Sidhauli

Government
  - Lok Sabha constituencies: Sitapur, Misrikh, Dhaurahra, Mohanlalganj

Area
  - Total: 5,743 km^{2} (2,217 sq mi)

Population (2011)
  - Total: 4,483,992
  - Density: 780.8/km^{2} (2,022/sq mi)
- Time zone: UTC+05:30 (IST)
- Website: sitapur.nic.in

Sitapur district is one of the districts which is situated in Uttar Pradesh state of India, with Sitapur town as the district headquarters. Sitapur district is a part of Lucknow division.

== History ==
Astik Baba Temple Nasirabad, Sidhauli, Sitapur 9th Century AD

Sitapur, located in India, is renowned for its rich mythological and historical significance. While there is no official explanation for its name, local tradition suggests that "Sitapur" is associated with Sita, the wife of Lord Ram. It is believed that Sita resided in this area with Lord Ram during a pilgrimage. Subsequently, King Vikramaditya is said to have founded the city in her honor, naming it Sitapur to commemorate her legacy. Historical references, such as those found in Abul Fazal's "Ain-i-Akbari," indicate that during the reign of Akbar, the place was known as Chatyapur or Chitiapur.

Sitapur was first constituted as a district by the British after their takeover of Oudh State in February 1856. Before that, under the Mughal Empire and then the Nawabs of Awadh, the area had been divided between multiple administrative units. Even earlier, under the Delhi Sultanate, it appears that the territory of the current district was part of the province of Bahraich, but this is unclear because contemporary sources do not mention this area.

During the reign of Akbar, the area of today's Sitapur district was divided between four sarkars, all in the Subah of Awadh. Most of it was in the sarkar of Khairabad: this area comprised the mahals of Haveli Khairabad, Hargam, Laharpur, Biswan, Machhrehta, Sitapur (called "Chhitiapur" in the Ain-i-Akbari), Sadrpur, Nimkhar (a large territory including the later parganas of Aurangabad, Misrikh, and Maholi), and Kharkila (later Korauna). The later pargana of Gundlamau is "untraceable" but was probably divided between Nimkhar and Machhrehta. In addition, the pargana of Chandra was then part of Gopamau in today's Hardoi district, which was also in Khairabad sarkar. A few mahals belonged to Lucknow sarkar: Bari, Manwan, Bahrimau (later Pirnagar; name changed under Jahangir), Bangaon, and Ramkot (included in Lucknow for some reason, although surrounded on all sides by Khairabad). Additionally, the mahal of Fatehpur, in today's Barabanki district, included part of Mahmudabad pargana, which now forms part of Sitapur. The mahal of Qila Nawagarh, comprising the later parganas of Tambaur and Kondri North, was part of Bahraich sarkar; finally, Kondri South was part of Sailuk mahal in the sarkar of Awadh.

A few parganas would be established later: for example, Mahmudabad was split off from Fatehpur, during the reign of Jahangir, and Kondri was formed out of Sailuk in 1739, during the reign of Saadat Khan I. Aurangabad pargana, originally part of Nimkhar, was split off by the taluqdars Muhammad Bakhsh and Qutb Muhammad several generations after the town's foundation in 1670.

The basic administrative setup, though, remained intact until the reign of Asaf-ud-Daula in the late 1700s. Under the later Mughal emperors and then the Nawabs of Awadh, Khairabad remained a relatively unimportant command, rarely mentioned in contemporary sources. It was not a very prestigious posting — when Safdar Jang appointed his subject Hidayat Ali Khan as faujdar of Khairabad, Hidayat Ali Khan was less than enthusiastic. Later, Asaf-ud-Daula divided his country into various chaklas and nizamats; the three chaklas that included areas of Sitapur district were Muhamdi, Khairabad, and Bari-Biswan.

After the British annexed Awadh in 1856, they selected Sitapur to serve as the headquarters of a new district in Khairabad division. The area between the Chauka and Ghaghra rivers briefly formed a separate district based at Mallanpur, which was part of Bahraich Division. It was decided before the 1857 uprising to abolish Mallanpur district, but it was not carried out until 1858 after the end of the conflict, and the parts south of the Dahawar were annexed to Sitapur.

From then on, and still in effect as of the early 1900s, Sitapur consisted of four tehsils and 21 parganas: Misrikh tehsil in the west (with parganas Maholi, Chandra, Misrikh, Aurangabad, Korauna, Machhrehta, and Gundlamau), Sitapur tehsil in the north and center (with parganas Sitapur, Ramkot, Pirnagar, Khairabad, Hargam, and Laharpur), Sidhauli tehsil in the south and southeast (with parganas Bari, Manwan, Mahmudabad, Sadrpur, and Kondri South), and Biswan tehsil in the east (with parganas Biswan, Tambaur, and Kondri North).

== Geography ==
Sitapur is located at 27.57°N 80.68°E. It test has an average elevation of 138 meters (452 feet). It is located in the Gangetic Plain, with elevations ranging from 150 m above sea level in the north-west to 100 m in the south-east. It is intersected by numerous streams and ravines and contains many shallow ponds and natural reservoirs, which overflow during the rainy seasons, but become dry, in some places, in the hot season. Except in the eastern portion, which lies in the doabs between the Kewani and the Chauka, and the Ghaghra and the Chauka rivers, the soil is semi arid. Even this moist tract is interspersed with patches of land covered with saline efflorescence called reh.

=== Drainage ===
The monotony of featureless plain of upper Ganga valley is preserved throughout the district. At places this monotony is broken by Small River like Kathana, Sarayan and Gomati. Sandy stretches are found along the rivers and locally known as bhurs. the region in general is a part of well integrated system of the river Ganga. Gomti is the most important tributary flows in the eastern part of the district and engulfs above mentioned small rivers. Ghaghara forms the eastern boundary of the district. There are five rivers flowing through the district of Sitapur: Gomti, Kathana, Pirai, Sarayan, Ghaghra and Sharda.

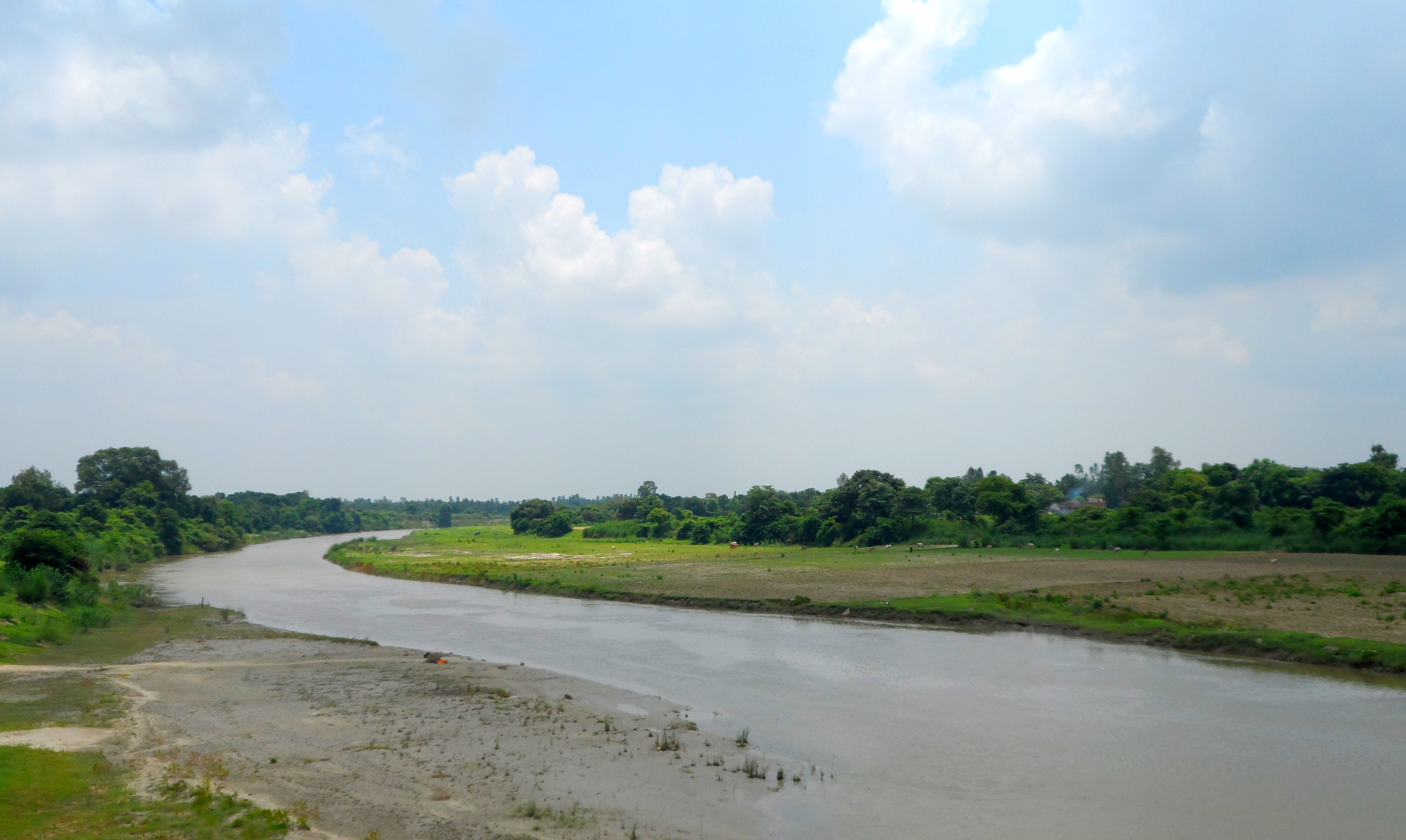
Gomati River near Terwa Ghat

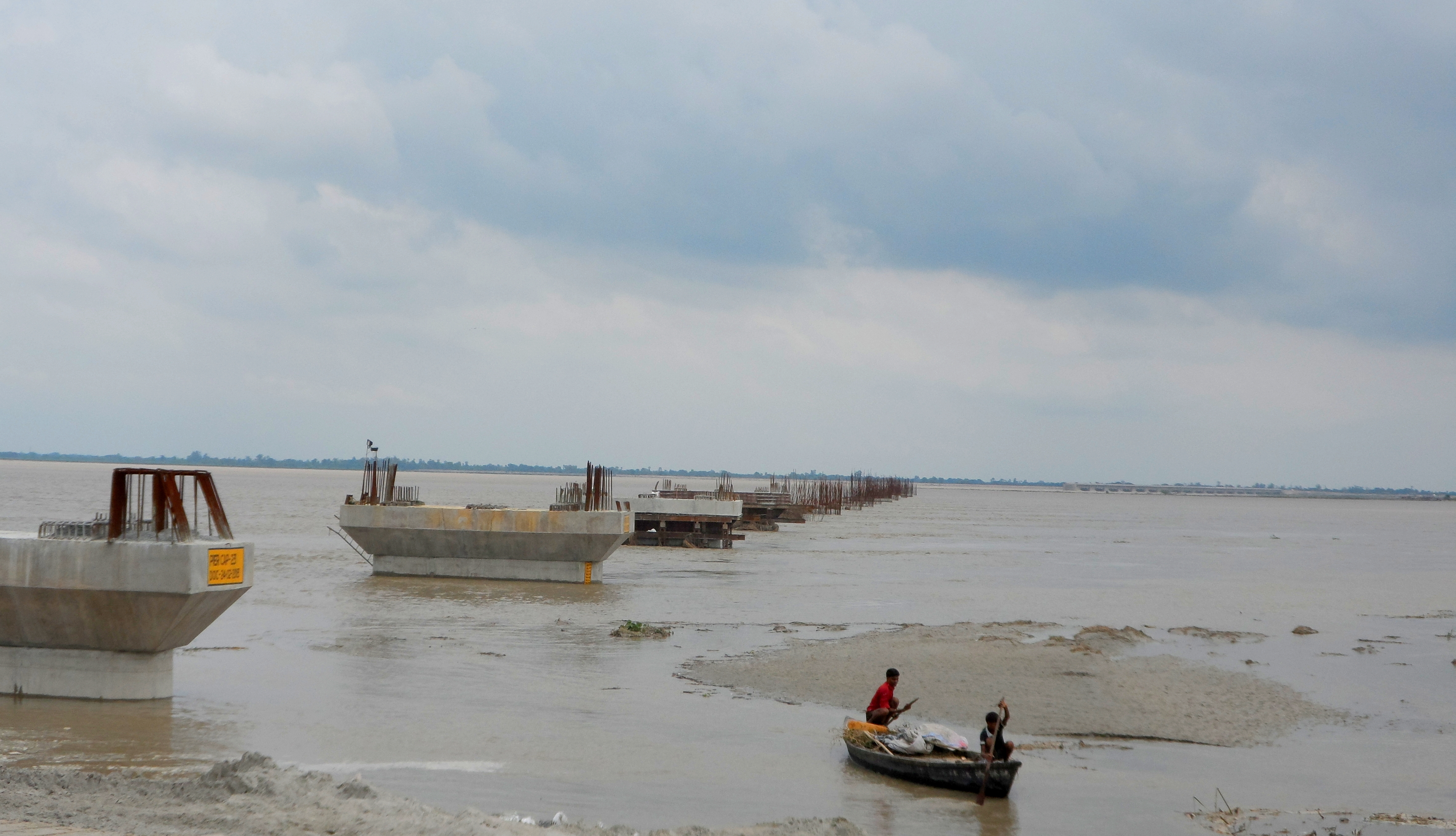
Ghaghra river at Chahlari Ghat

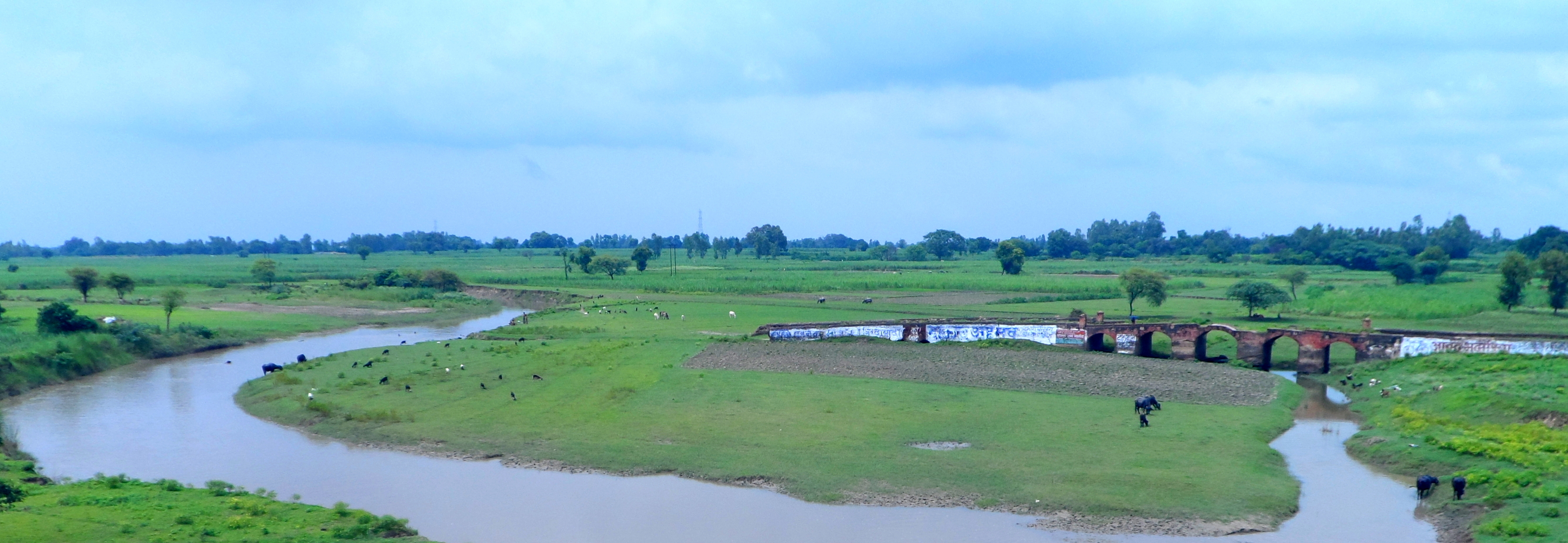
River Kathna in Maholi

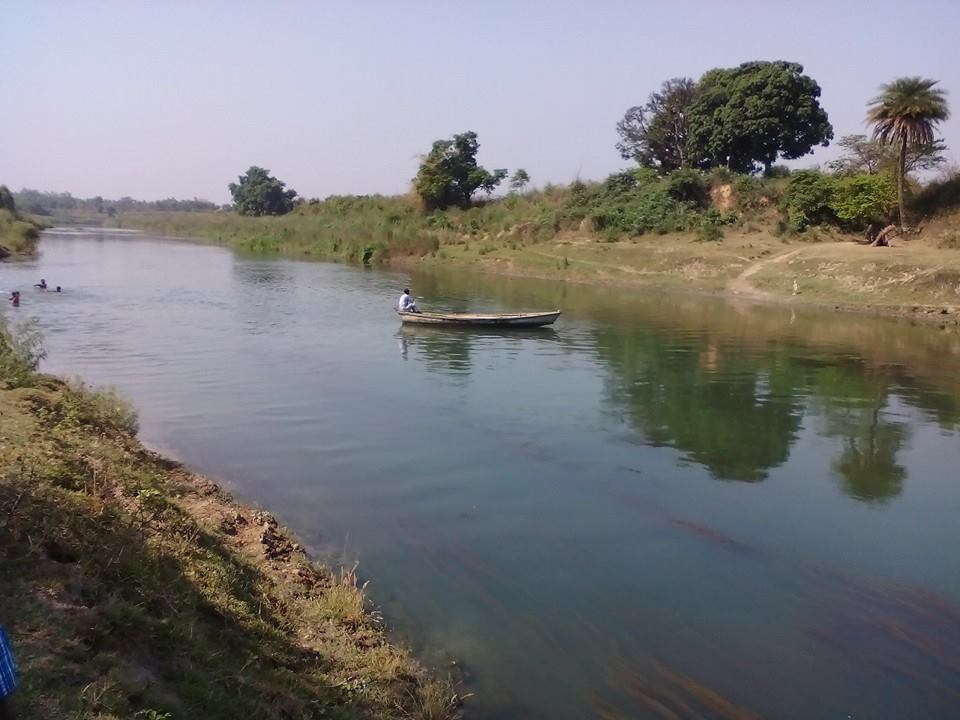
Gomati River at Naimisharanya

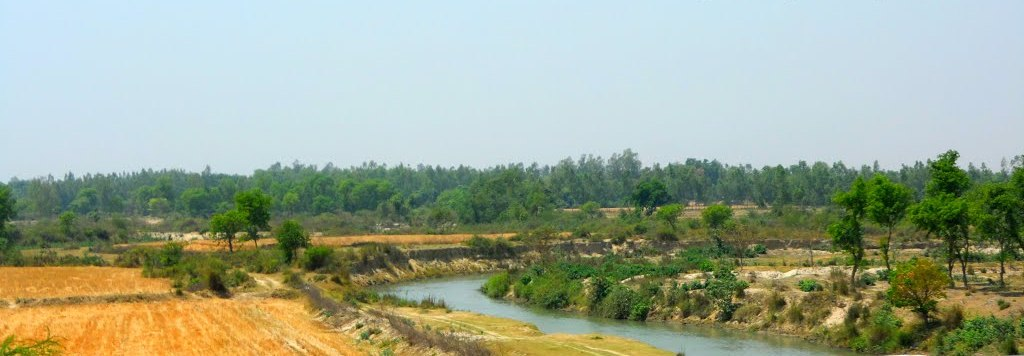
Kathna near Pisawan

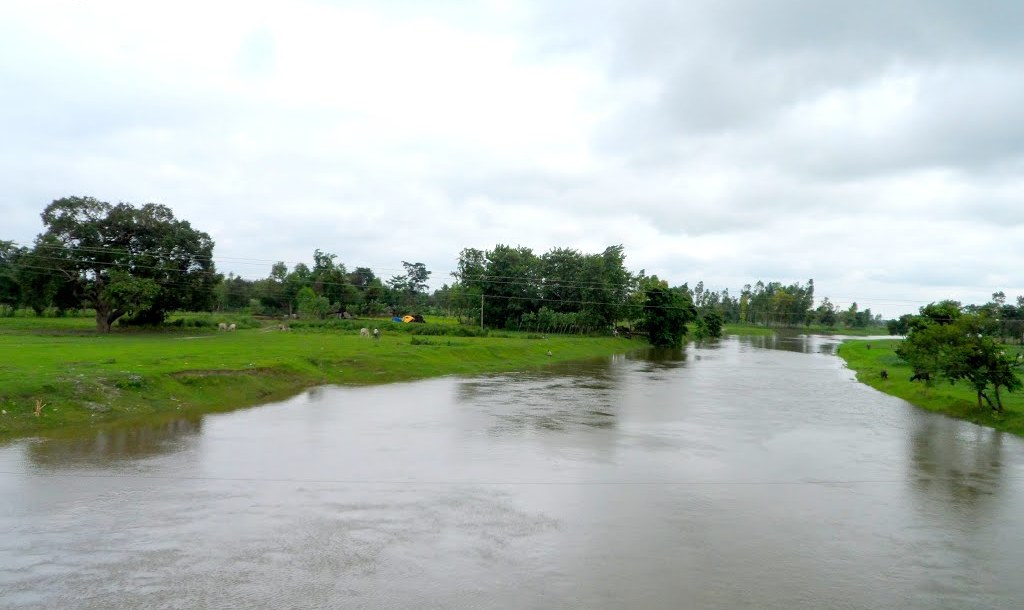
Ull river near Rampur Mathura

=== Climate ===
The gradual rise in temperature starts in the months of February and becomes more rapid by March and April unless checked by more humid easterlies. The local hot and gusty winds, locally known as loo, result in hot and scorching weather. The condition is aggravated further by presence of meager relative humidity (40%). The district of the study does not show much influence of Himalaya which otherwise tend to lower the temperatures in the places nearby as in the case of Meerut and Gonda.

The pre-monsoon showers are meager and this along with low humidity accentuates the impact of loo which at times changes into heat waves with exceptionally high temperature. The rainy season commences in the latter half of the June at different dates which are too difficult to be predicted. It brings relief to the people by lowering the temperatures up to 30 °C. The rainfall decreases southward and westward in the region. There is a dominance of Bay of Bengal currents. This season comes to an end by October with a sudden fall in temperature and amount of rainfall. Soon after the winter conditions settle in at times cold waves and westerly disturb the general monotony of the winters. The showers due to western depressions are very useful for the rabi crop in the region. The average rainfall in the study area varies between 105 cm to 150 cm.

== Political and administrative divisions ==
The district is divided into seven tehsils namely Sitapur, Biswan, Maholi, Mishrikh, Laharpur, Mahmudabad and Sidhauli and 19 blocks namely Pisawan, Maholi, Misrikh, Machhrehta, Gondlamau, Ailiya, Hargaon, Parsendi, Khairabad, Laharpur, Behta, Reusa, Sakran, Biswan, Pahala, Mahmudabad, Rampur Mathura, Kasmanda and Sidhauli. There are 2348 census villages and 1329 Gram Panchayats in the district. Sitapur has nine seats in Uttar Pradesh Vidhan Sabha. These nine constituencies are:

- Biswan,
- Hargaon,
- Laharpur,
- Mahmoodabad,
- Maholi,
- Misrikh,
- Sevata,
- Sidhauli and
- Sitapur,

The district is divided into four Lok Sabha seats:

- Sitapur Lok Sabha constituency includes Sitapur, Laharpur, Biswan, Sewta and Mahmoodabad Vidhan Sabha seats,
- Dhaurahra Lok Sabha constituency includes Maholi and Hargaon Vidhan Sabha seat from Sitapur district,
- Mohanlalganj Lok Sabha constituency includes Sidhauli Vidhan Sabha seat from Sitapur district,
- Misrikh Lok Sabha constituency includes Misrikh seat from Sitapur district.

== Demographics ==
Historical population
Year	Pop.	±% p.a.
1901	1,180,506	—
1911	1,144,011	−0.31%
1921	1,094,581	−0.44%
1931	1,172,580	+0.69%
1941	1,299,494	+1.03%
1951	1,386,918	+0.65%
1961	1,608,057	+1.49%
1971	1,884,400	+1.60%
1981	2,337,284	+2.18%
1991	2,857,009	+2.03%
2001	3,619,661	+2.39%
2011	4,483,992	+2.16%

As of 2011 India census, Sitapur district has population of 4,483,992 of which male and female are 2,375,264 and 2,108,728 respectively. District Sitapur ranks 8th in terms of population in Uttar Pradesh. The density of Sitapur district for 2011 is 781 people per km^{2}. In 2001, it was about 630 people per km^{2}. Sitapur town/city has a population of 1,77,351. Males constitute 52.67% of the population and females 47.41%. Sitapur has an average literacy rate of 61%, lower than the national average of 74.04%. Female literacy is about 50%. In Sitapur, 16.6% of the population was under 6 years of age. Sitapur has a sex ratio of 888 females per 1000 males. 11.84% of the population lives in urban areas. Scheduled Castes made up 32.26% of the population. There are 801,764 households in the district accounting for 2.4 percent of the total households in the state. The average size of households in the district is 5.6 persons.

=== Urbanization ===
Out of the total Sitapur population, the percentage share of urban population in the district is 11.8% as against 22.3 percent of the population in urban areas of the state. The district has 12 towns out of them 11 are statutory and one town is a census town.

According to housing census, 2011, total 723 families live on footpath or without any roof cover in the district. The total Population of all who lived without roof at the time of Census 2011 is 3,460. This is approximately 0.08% of the total population of Sitapur district.

In 2006 the Ministry of Panchayati Raj named Sitapur one of the country's 250 most backward districts (out of a total of 640). It is one of the 34 districts in Uttar Pradesh currently receiving funds from the Backward Regions Grant Fund Programme (BRGF).

=== Religion ===
Religions in Sitapur district (2011)
Religion	Percent
Hinduism	79.29%
Islam	19.93%
Other or not stated	0.78%
Distribution of religions

Hindus constitute about 79% of total population of the district and Muslims are about 20% of the total population. In Sitapur, Hindus and Muslims work together in the carpet industry. The district has a concentration of fakirs.

=== Languages ===
Languages of Sitapur district (2011)
1. Hindi (93.1%)
2. Urdu (5.62%)
3. Awadhi (0.83%)
4. Others (0.43%)

At the time of the 2011 Census of India, 93.12% of the population in the district spoke Hindi (or a related language) and 5.62% Urdu as their first language.

Languages spoken here include Awadhi, a vernacular in the Hindi continuum spoken by over 38 million people, mainly in the Awadh region. Sanskrit, Punjabi and English are also understood among a minuscule minority. Apart from Hindi, English is now part of curricula in most government and private schools.

== Economy ==
Sitapur has a diverse economy primarily driven by agriculture. The fertile plains of the region support the cultivation of various crops, including wheat, sugarcane, rice, and pulses, making agriculture a vital part of the local economy. Additionally, Sitapur is known for its production of handloom textiles and traditional crafts, which contribute to the livelihood of many artisans in the area. The district has also seen a gradual increase in small-scale industries and trade, bolstered by its strategic location and improving infrastructure. Sitapur has officially been integrated into the State Capital Region of the Uttar Pradesh government. This designation is expected to enhance agricultural and industrial investments in the area, ultimately providing a significant boost to the local economy. Despite these developments, challenges such as seasonal flooding and reliance on monsoon rains continue to impact agricultural productivity and the overall economic stability of the region.

== Notable sites ==
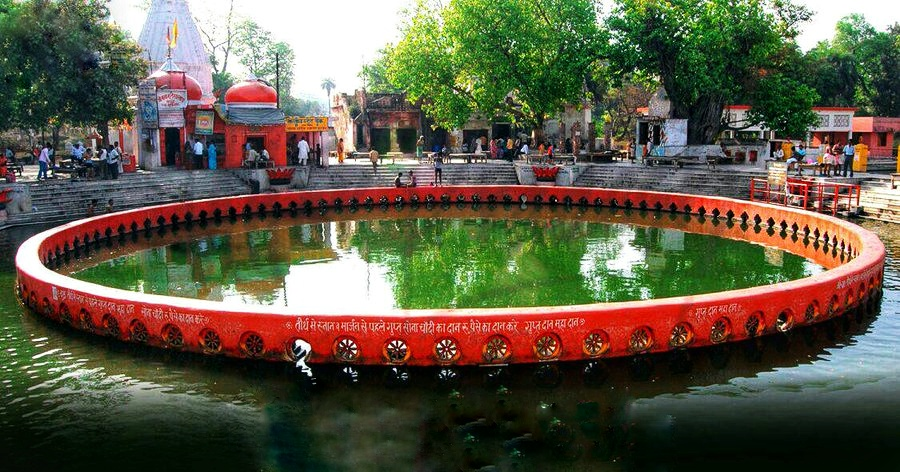
Namisharanya Chakra Tirth

- Suta Gaddi is a site where according to legend Suta Goswami narrated Puranas.
- Vyas Gaddi is where Rishi Vyas divided Vedas into four parts..

== Notable people ==
- Acharya Narendra Dev
- Fazl-e-Haq Khairabadi
- Jan Nisar Akhtar, Urdu poet
- Salman Akhtar, psychoanalyst
- Muztar Khairabadi, Urdu poet
- Manoj Kumar Pandey, Param Veer Chakra
- Raja Todar Mal, finance minister and one of the Navratn in Emperor Akbar's court
- Wajahat Mirza, screenwriter and film director, won Filmfare awards for Mughal-e-Azam and Ganga Jamuna
- Mahesh Prasad Mehray, Padma Vibhushan, founder of Sitapur Eye Hospital
- Narottam Das, poet
- Mukhtar Anis, Politician

== Filmography ==
1. Umrao Jaan (2006 film) 2. Dedh Ishqiya 3. Kagaz (Shooting Near Biswan)

== Photography ==
Ancient Siddheshwer Temple

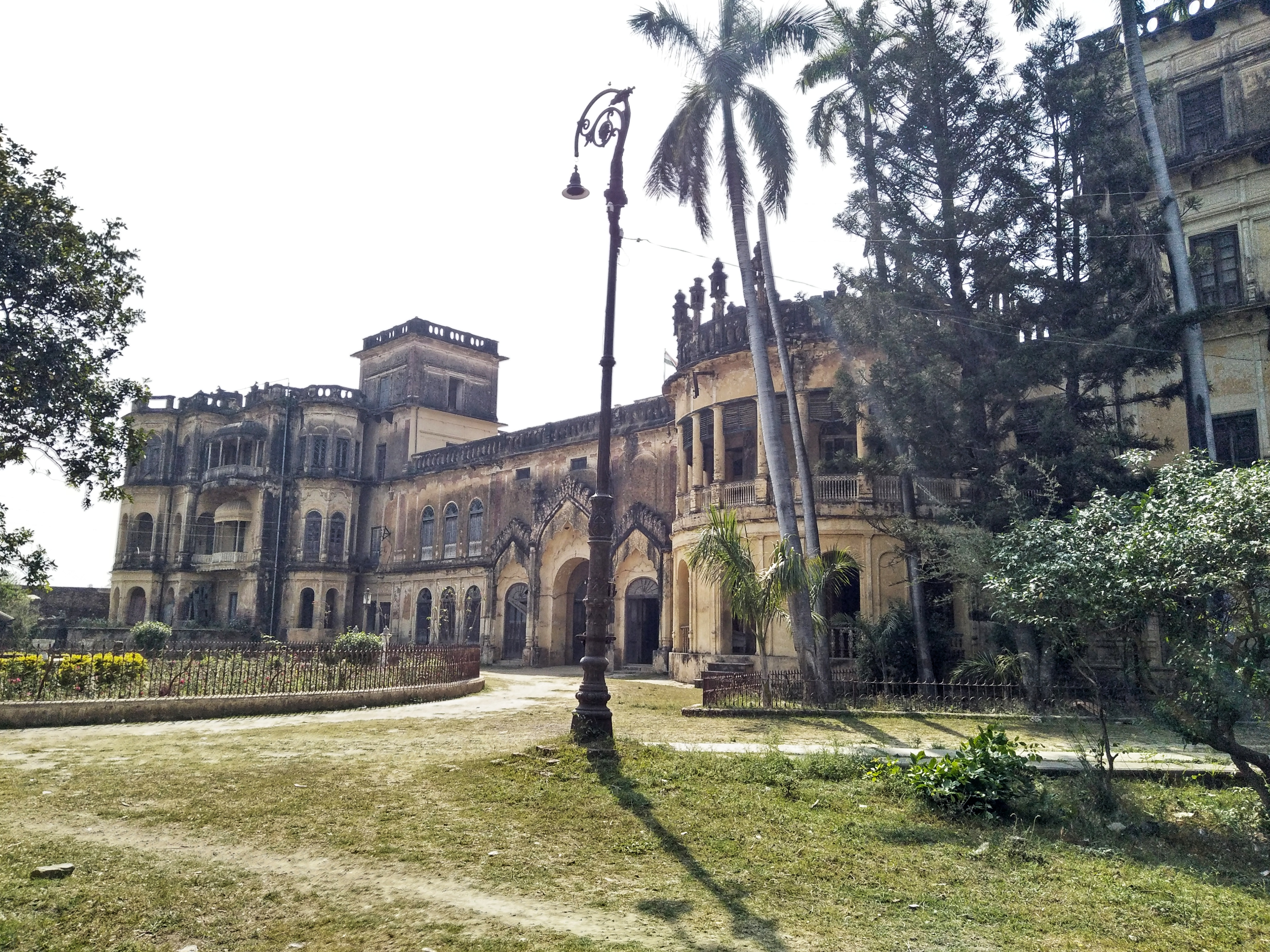
Mahmoodabad Quila
