= Misrikh =

- City
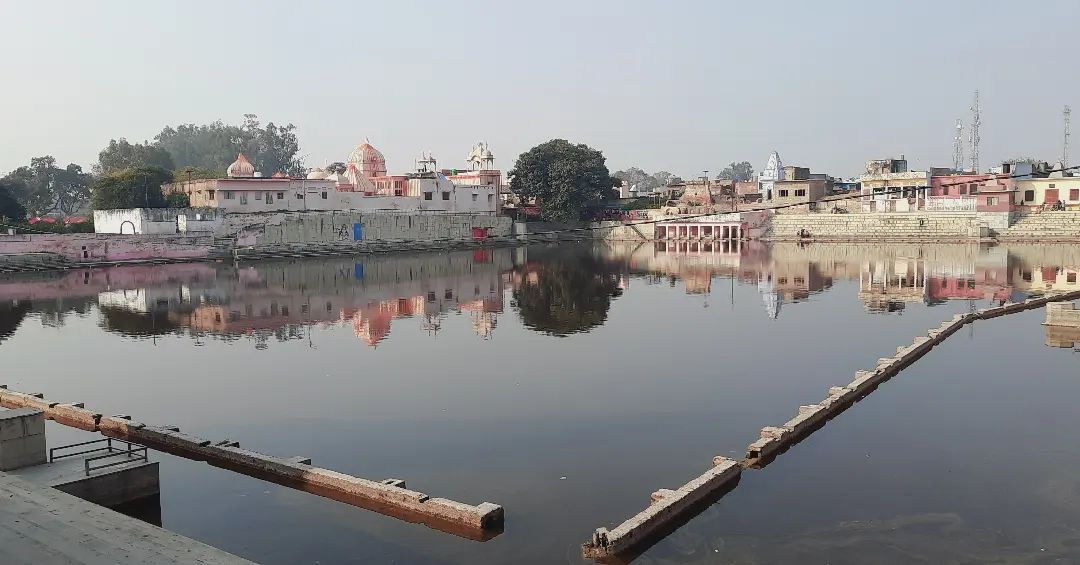
- Dadhichi Kund in the premises of the legendary Dadhichi Ashram in the city.

- Location in Uttar Pradesh, India
- Coordinates: 27°27′N 80°31′E
- Country: India
- State: Uttar Pradesh
- District: Sitapur

Population (2011)
  - Total: 18,390

Languages
  - Official: Hindi
- Time zone: UTC+5:30 (IST)
- Postal code: 261401
- Vehicle registration: UP 34
- Website: https://sitapur.nic.in/hi/

Misrikh is a city and a municipal board in Sitapur district in the Indian state of Uttar Pradesh.

== History ==
The region came under Magadh Kingdom in ancient India. After the fall of the Nandas and the Mauryas, the region came under the power of the Shunga dynasty. Terracotta sculptures of Shunga style were found in nearby Sidhauli Tehsil. Similarly, some small idols of Gupta period were found in Badesar in Mishrik Tehsil. Naimisharanya, also known as Neemsar, holds immense religious importance in Hindu mythology and is mentioned in several ancient scriptures, including the Mahabharata and the Puranas, situated on the left bank of the Gomti, it is a pilgrimage site where Maharishi Ved Vyas composed the Puranas. During the post-Vedic period, it is believed that a vast university (Shaunaka Mahashala) existed in the region where 88,000 Shastri rishis gathered knowledge to perform a thousand-year sacrificial ritual (yagna) to purify the world. Naimisharanya is renowned for its temples, sacred ponds, and the Chakra Tirtha, a revered water body where devotees take holy dips. The proximity of Misrikh to such a prominent spiritual center enhances its cultural and historical significance, attracting numerous pilgrims and tourists to the area.

Religions in Misrikh
Religion	Percent
Hindus	96%
Muslims	4%
Jains	0.5%
Others†	0.5%
Distribution of religions †Includes Sikhs (0.2%), Buddhists (<0.2%).

== Demographics ==
Religion	Total		Male	Female
Hindu	835,817	(90.24%)	447,279	388,538
Muslim	82,275	(8.88%)	42,863	39,412
Christian	967	(0.1%)	496	471
Sikh	2,665	(0.29%)	1,438	1,227
Buddhist	634	(0.07%)	326	308
Jain	51	(0.01%)	17	34
Other Religion	10	(0%)	6	4
No Religion Specified	3,782	(0.41%)	1,897	1,885

Total	Male	Female	
Children (Age 0-6)	143,607	75,008	68,599
Literacy	66.25%	64.72%	45.98%
Scheduled Caste	354,306	189,416	164,890
Scheduled Tribe	456	241	215
Illiterate	407,697	174,399	233,298

Total	Male	Female	
Schedule Caste	354,306	189,416	164,890
Schedule Tribe	456	241	215

Total	Male	Female	
Main Workers	207,013	183,571	23,442
Cultivators	111,954	103,525	8,429
Agriculture Labourer	56,548	50,982	5,566
Household Industries	6,784	4,397	2,387
Other Workers	31,727	24,667	7,060
Marginal Workers	88,383	62,818	25,565
Non Working	630,805	247,933	382,872

== Notable people ==
Parliament MP: Ashok Kumar Rawat (Misrikh)

Assembly MLAs:

- Ramkrishna Bhargava (Misrikh)
- Manish Rawat (Sidhauli)

== Nearby Prominent Villages (Naimiṣāraṇya Tirth) ==
=== Naimisaradya Village ===
Naimisaradya village lies within the Misrikh tehsil of Sitapur district, Uttar Pradesh. It covers an area of approximately 466 hectares and had a population of about 1,420 as per the 2011 Census. The village is situated adjacent to the main Naimisharanya pilgrimage area, and serves as one of the key local habitations supporting pilgrims and temple activities.

=== Anogi Village ===
Anogi (Hindi: अनोगी) is a village in Machhrehta block of Misrikh tehsil in Sitapur district, Uttar Pradesh, India. It forms part of the Lucknow Division. Th and is often associated with this pilgrimage site. It functions as an independent gram panchayat (village council).

=== Thakurnagar Village ===
Thakurnagar is another settlement situated in the vicinity of Naimisharanya and likewise appears in the list of 36 villages under the Naimisharanya Dham development notification. It is believed to lie along or close to the traditional parikrama (circumambulation) route associated with the Dham.

== Naimiṣāraṇya Tirth ==
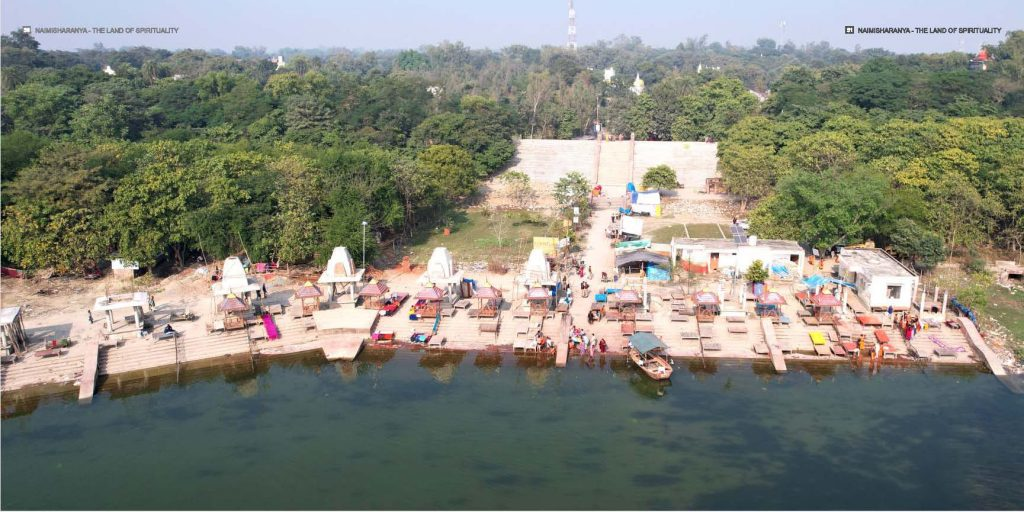
Naimiṣāraṇya

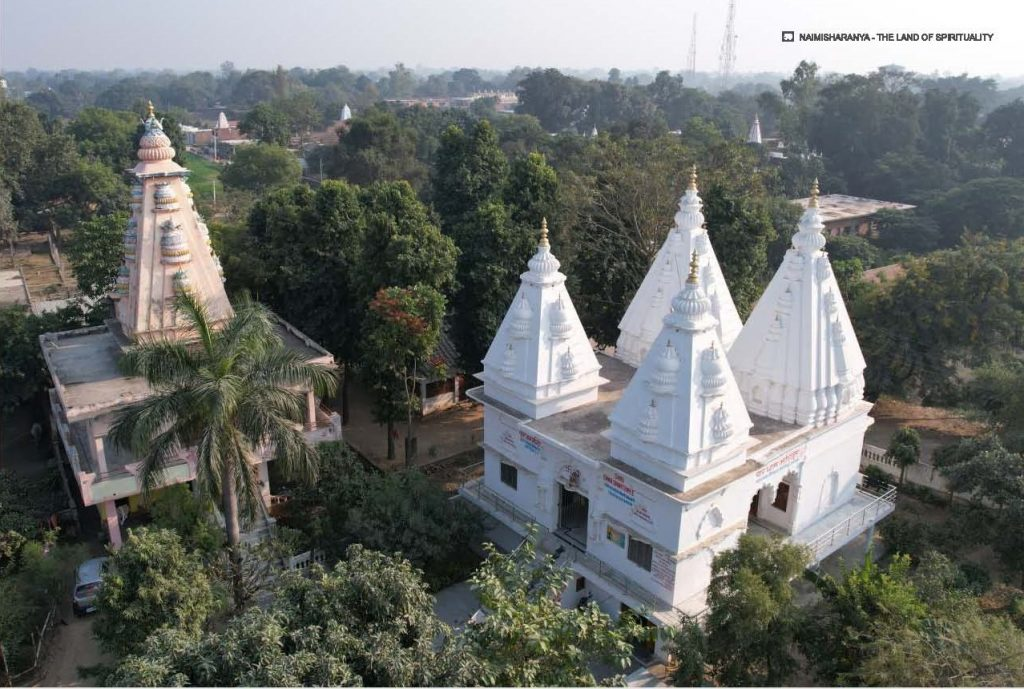

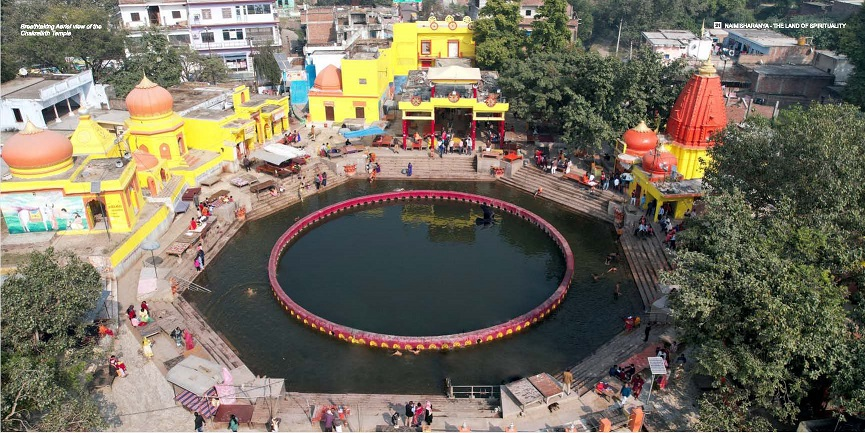
Naimiṣāraṇya

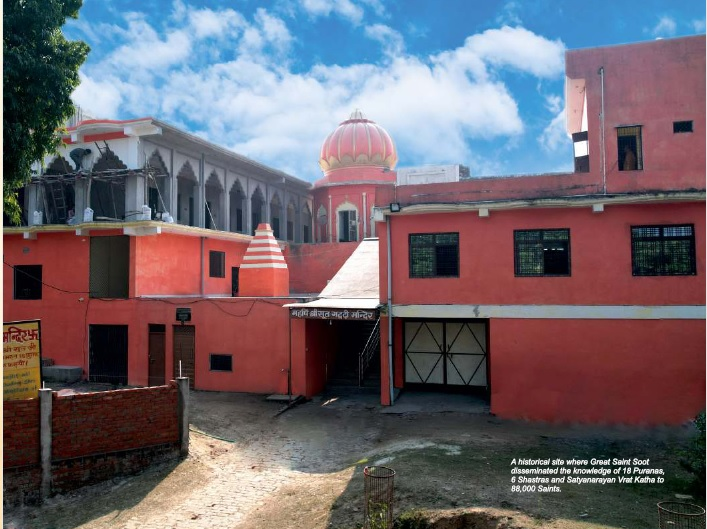
Naimiṣāraṇya

== Assembly Segments ==
Presently, Misrikh Lok Sabha comprises five Vidhan Sabha (legislative assembly) segments. These are:

No	Name	District	Member	Party
153	Misrikh (SC)	Sitapur	Ramkrishna Bhargav	Bharatiya Janata Party
159	Bilgram-Mallanwan	Hardoi	Ashish Kumar Singh	Bharatiya Janata Party
160	Balamau (SC)	Hardoi	Rampal Verma	Bharatiya Janata Party
161	Sandila	Hardoi	Alka Singh Arkvanshi	Bharatiya Janata Party
209	Bilhaur (SC)	Kanpur Nagar	Rahul Bachha Sonkar	Bharatiya Janata Party

== Members of Parliament ==
Year	Member	Party
1962	Gokaran Prasad	Bharatiya Jana Sangh
1967	Sankta Prasad	Indian National Congress
1971	Sankta Prasad	Indian National Congress
1977	Ram Lal Rahi	Janata Party
1980	Ram Lal Rahi	Indian National Congress
1984	Sankta Prasad	Indian National Congress
1989	Ram Lal Rahi	Indian National Congress
1991	Ram Lal Rahi	Indian National Congress
1996	Paragi Lal	Bharatiya Janata Party
1998	Ram Shankar Bhargava	Bahujan Samaj Party
1999	Sushila Saroj	Samajwadi Party
2004	Ashok Kumar Rawat	Bahujan Samaj Party
2009	Ashok Kumar Rawat	Bahujan Samaj Party
2014	Anju Bala	Bharatiya Janata Party
2019	Ashok Kumar Rawat	Bharatiya Janata Party
2024	Ashok Kumar Rawat	Bharatiya Janata Party

== Lok Sabha Election Results ==
=== Lok Sabha 2024 ===
2024 Indian general elections: Misrikh
Party	Candidate	Votes	%	±%
BJP	Ashok Kumar Rawat	475,016	45.15	▼6.90
SP	Sangita Rajwanshi	4,41,610	41.98	▲41.98
BSP	B R Ahirwar	1,11,945	10.64	▼31.61
NOTA	None of the Above	8,029	0.76	▼0.23
Majority		33,406	3.18	▼6.62
Turnout		10,51,983	56.01	▼1.16
BJP hold		Swing		

=== Lok Sabha 2019 ===
2019 Indian general elections: Misrikh
Party	Candidate	Votes	%	±%
BJP	Ashok Kumar Rawat	534,429	52.05	
BSP	Neelu Satyarthi	4,33,757	42.25	
INC	Manjari Rahi	26,505	2.58	
PSP(L)	Arun Kumari Kori	2,442	0.24	
NOTA	None of the Above	10,181	0.99	
Majority		1,00,642	9.80	
Turnout		10,27,382	57.17	
BJP hold		Swing		

=== Lok Sabha 2014 ===
2014 Indian general elections: Misrikh
Party	Candidate	Votes	%	±%
BJP	Anju Bala	4,12,575	41.33	
BSP	Ashok Kumar Rawat	3,25,212	32.58	
SP	Jai Prakash	1,94,759	19.51	
INC	Om Prakash	33,075	3.31	
Independent	Hans Mukhi Katheria	8,635	0.86	
NOTA	None of the Above	9,633	0.96	
Majority		87,363	8.75	
Turnout		9,98,314	57.85	
BJP gain from BSP		Swing		

== See also ==
- Sitapur district
- Hardoi district
- List of constituencies of the Lok Sabha
- Machhrehta
- Anogi
