= Anogi =

Village in Sitapur, Uttar Pradesh, India

- Village
- Location in Uttar Pradesh, India Anogi (India)
- Coordinates: 27.32°N 80.66°E
- Country: India
- State: Uttar Pradesh
- District: Sitapur

Government
  - Body: Gram panchayat
  - Sarpanch: Rana Pratap Singh

Area
  - Total: 435 ha (1,070 acres)
- Elevation: 435,520 m (1,428,870 ft)

Population (2011)
  - Total: 3,326
- Time zone: UTC+5:30 (IST)
- PIN: 261403
- Village Code: 137274
- Vehicle registration: UP-34

Anogi is a village in Machhrehta block of Misrikh tehsil in Sitapur, Uttar Pradesh, India. It belongs to the Lucknow Division. It had a population of 3,326 as of 2011. It is a gram panchayat.

== Government and politics ==
Kiran Bala Singh is the current village Sarpanch (प्रधान) and Gaurav Mishra is the Panchayat Secretary (पंचायत सचिव). Ashok Rawat is the current Parliament Member from Misrikh.

== Geoography ==
is situated 18km away from sub-district headquarter Misrikh (tehsildar office) and 31km away from district headquarter Sitapur. As per 2009 stats, Anogi village is also a gram panchayat. It is 70 km from the state capital Lucknow.

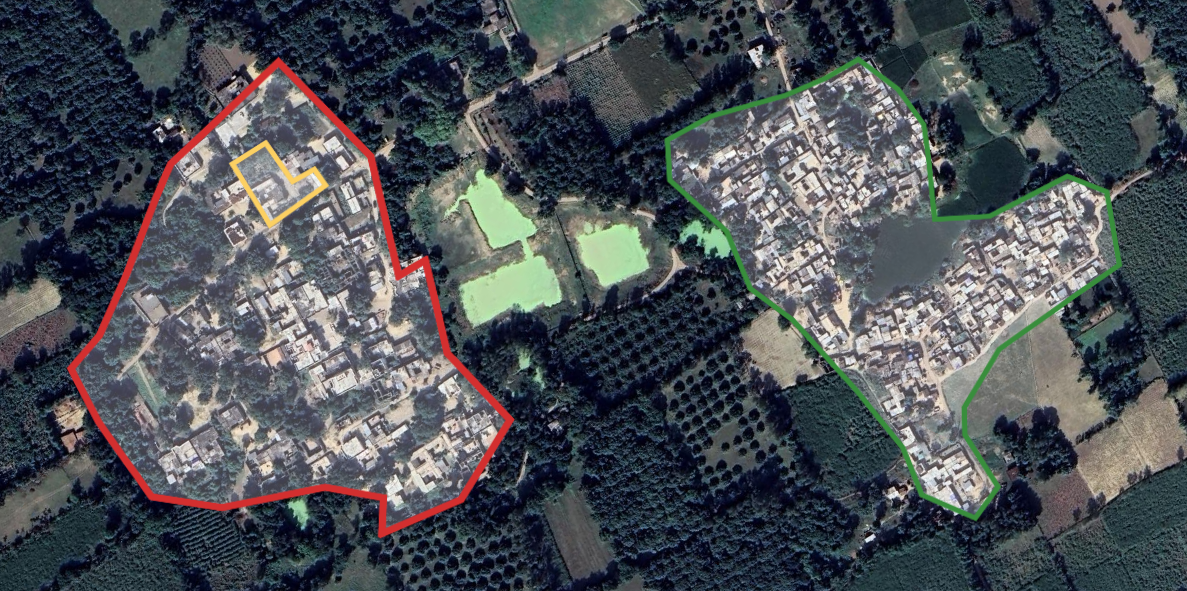

Religion in Anogi (Census 2011)
Religion	Percent
Hinduism	87.52%
Islam	12.25%
Others	0.23%

== Notable people ==
Parliament MP: Ashok Kumar Rawat (Misrikh)

Assembly MLAs:

- Ramkrishna Bhargava (Misrikh)
- Manish Rawat (Sidhauli)

== Demographics ==
According to the 2011 Census, the total population of Anogi is 3,326, comprising 1,760 males and 1,566 females. This results in an average sex ratio of 890 females for every 1,000 males.

Children aged 0–6 years in Anogi number 493, which constitutes 15% of the total. Among these children, 255 are male and 238 are female. The child sex ratio is 933 females for every 1,000 males, which is higher than the village's overall sex ratio.

The literacy rate in Anogi is 69.6%, significantly higher than the overall literacy rate of 50.9% in the Sitapur district. Male literacy in the village is 83.65%, while female literacy is 53.77%.

Scheduled Castes (SC) make up 47.2% of Anogi's population, while no Scheduled Tribes (ST) are reported in the village.

Hindus are the largest religious group, with Muslims forming the second largest minority. The town also hosts significant populations of Christians and Sikhs.

1,380 were involved in some type of work. 61.4% of workers describe their work as "Main Work," meaning permanent employment or the job provided livelihood for more than 6 months of the year. Meanwhile, 38.6% of workers described their work as "Marginal" work, meaning the job provided livelihood for less than 6 months of the year. Of the 1,380 workers engaged in "Main Work," 342 were landowners (called "cultivators" by the Census), while 216 were agricultural labourers.

== Gallery ==
Kamlapur Kasmanda Quila

Mahatma Gandhi Statue Sidhauli

Kasmanda Quila Kamlapur

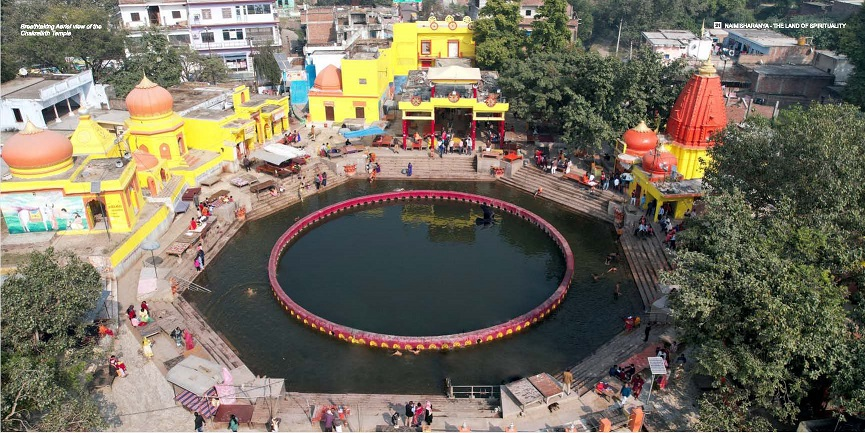
Naimisharanya (Neemsar)

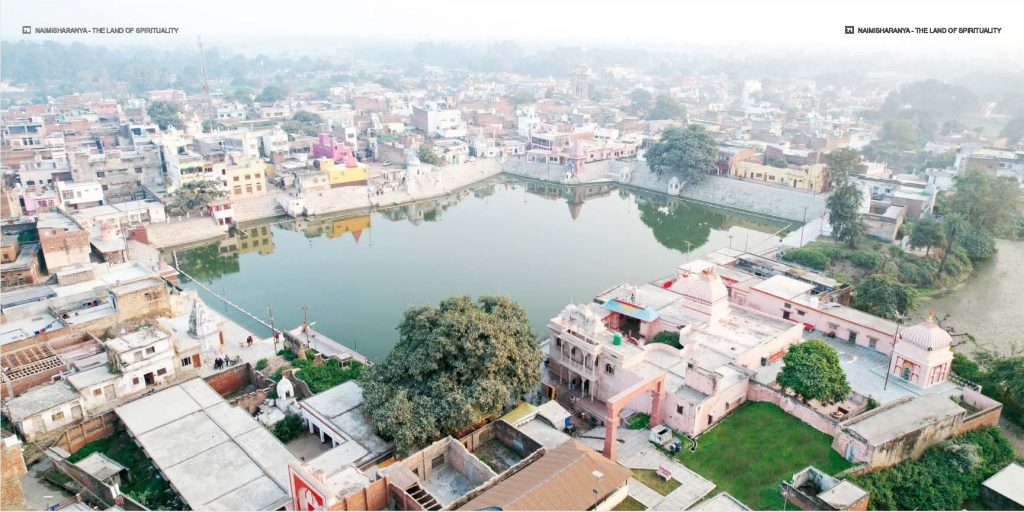
Naimisharanya (Neemsar)

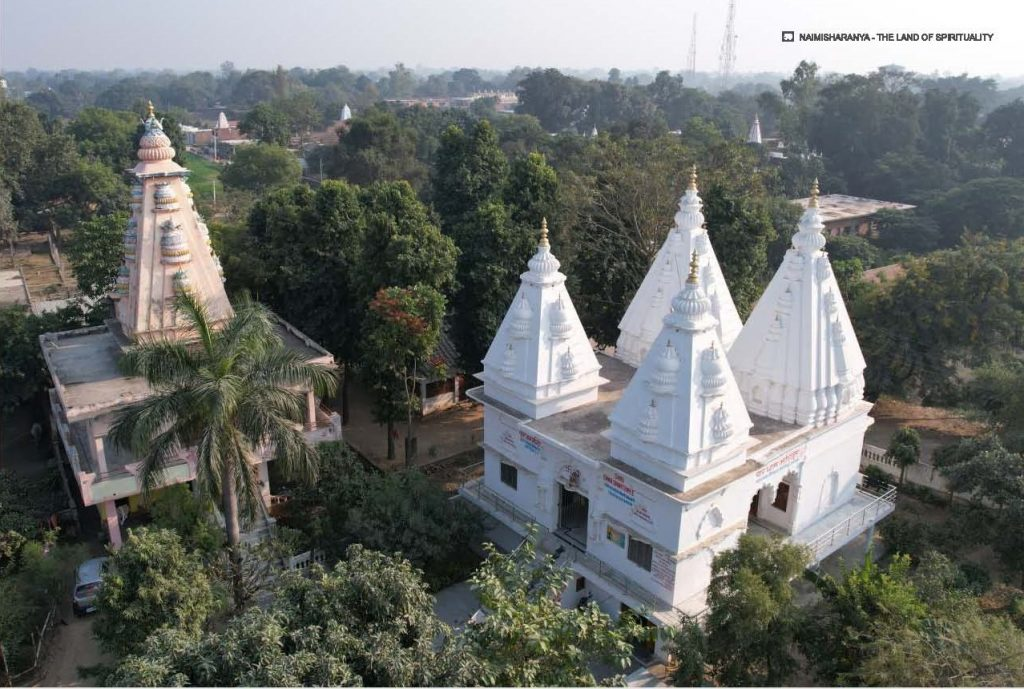
Naimisharanya (Neemsar)

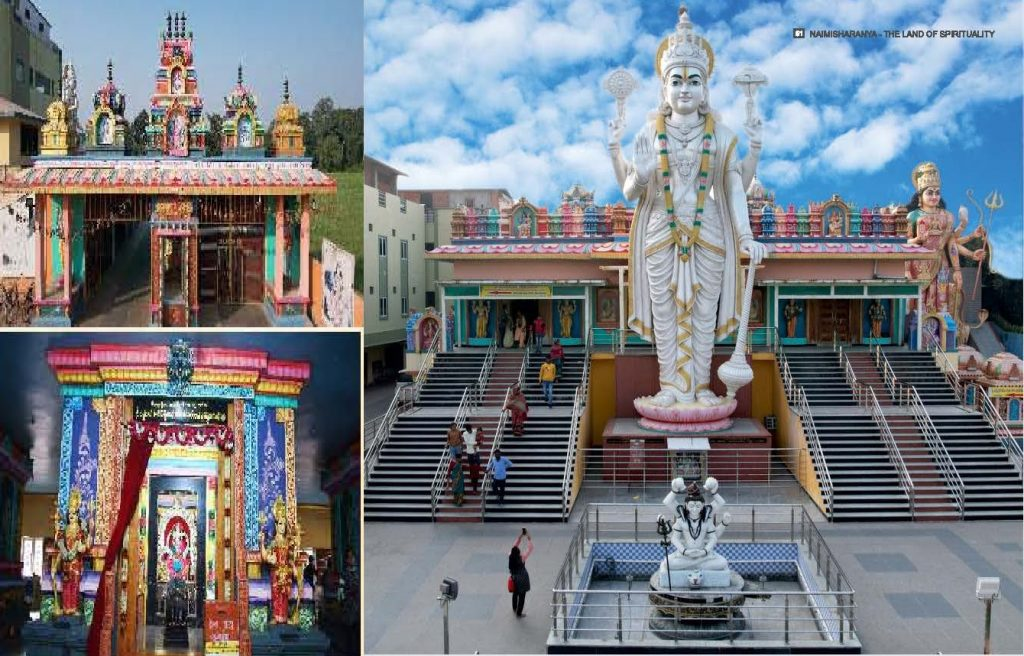
Naimisharanya (Neemsar)

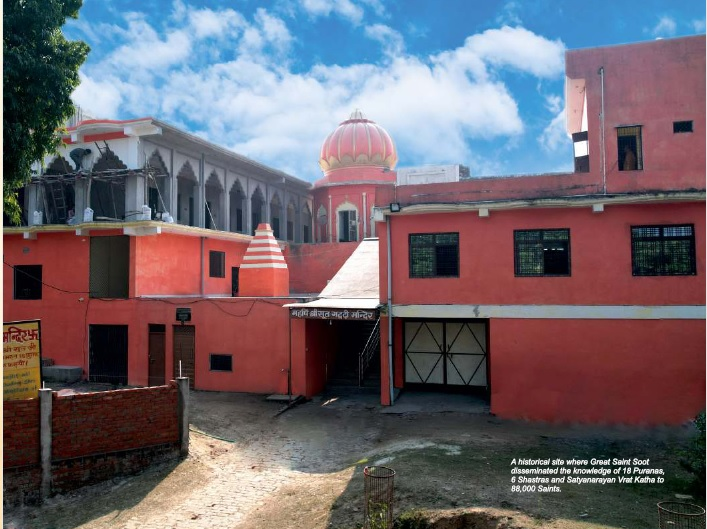
Maharshi Shree Suta Gaddi Mandir at Naimisharanya.

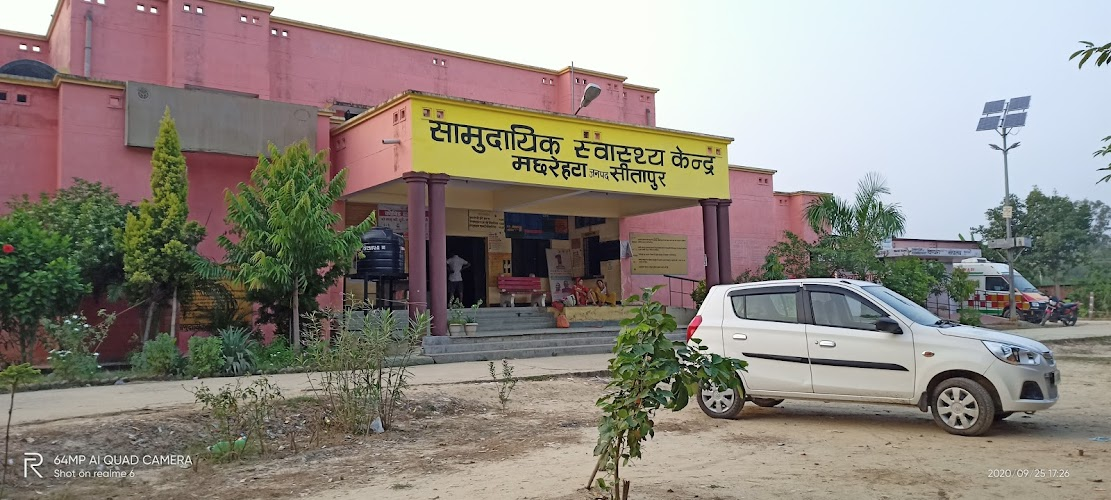
Public Health Centre Machhrehta

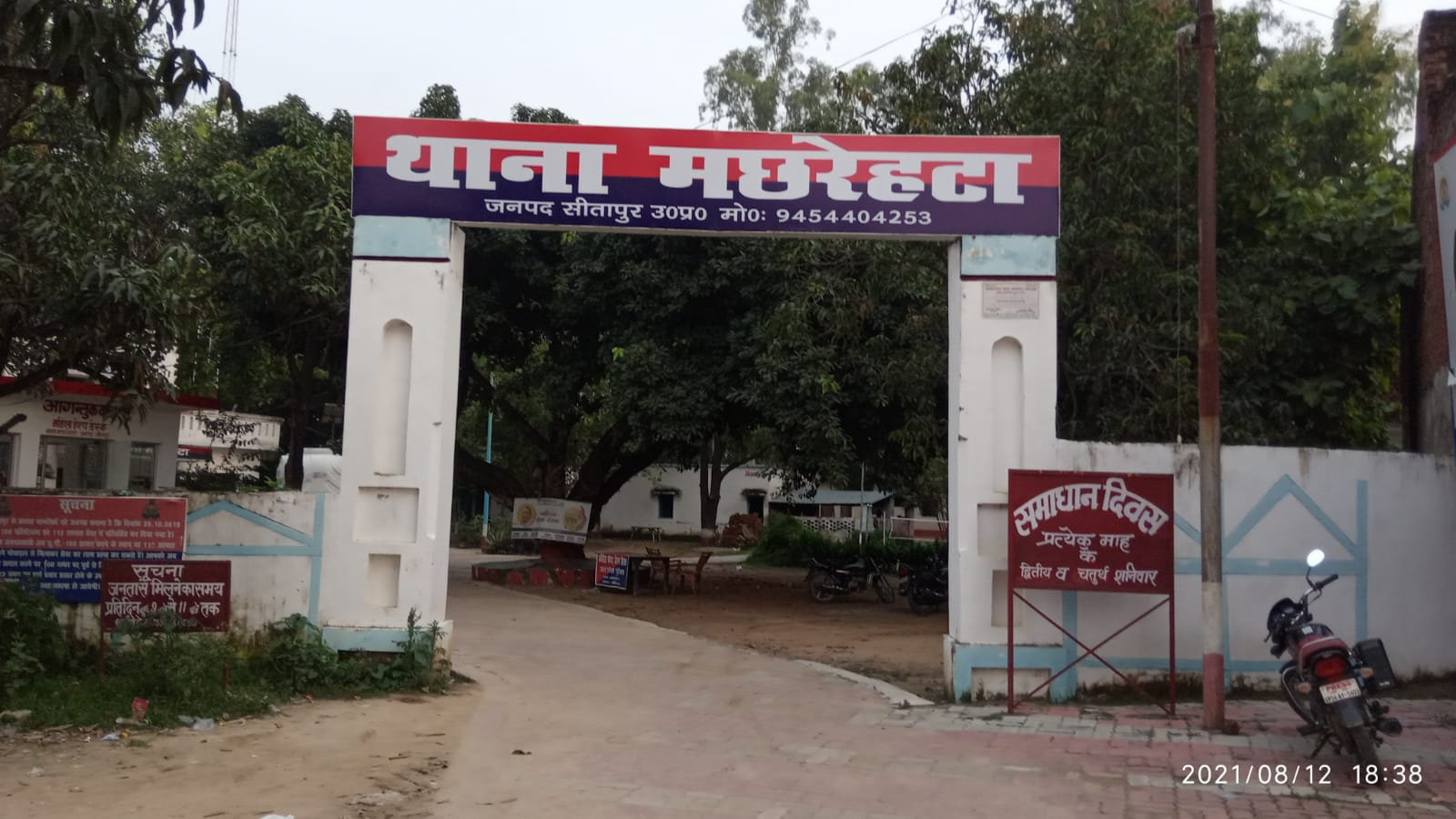
Machhrehta Police Station
