= Machhrehta =

Area of Misrikh in Uttar Pradesh, India

- Town
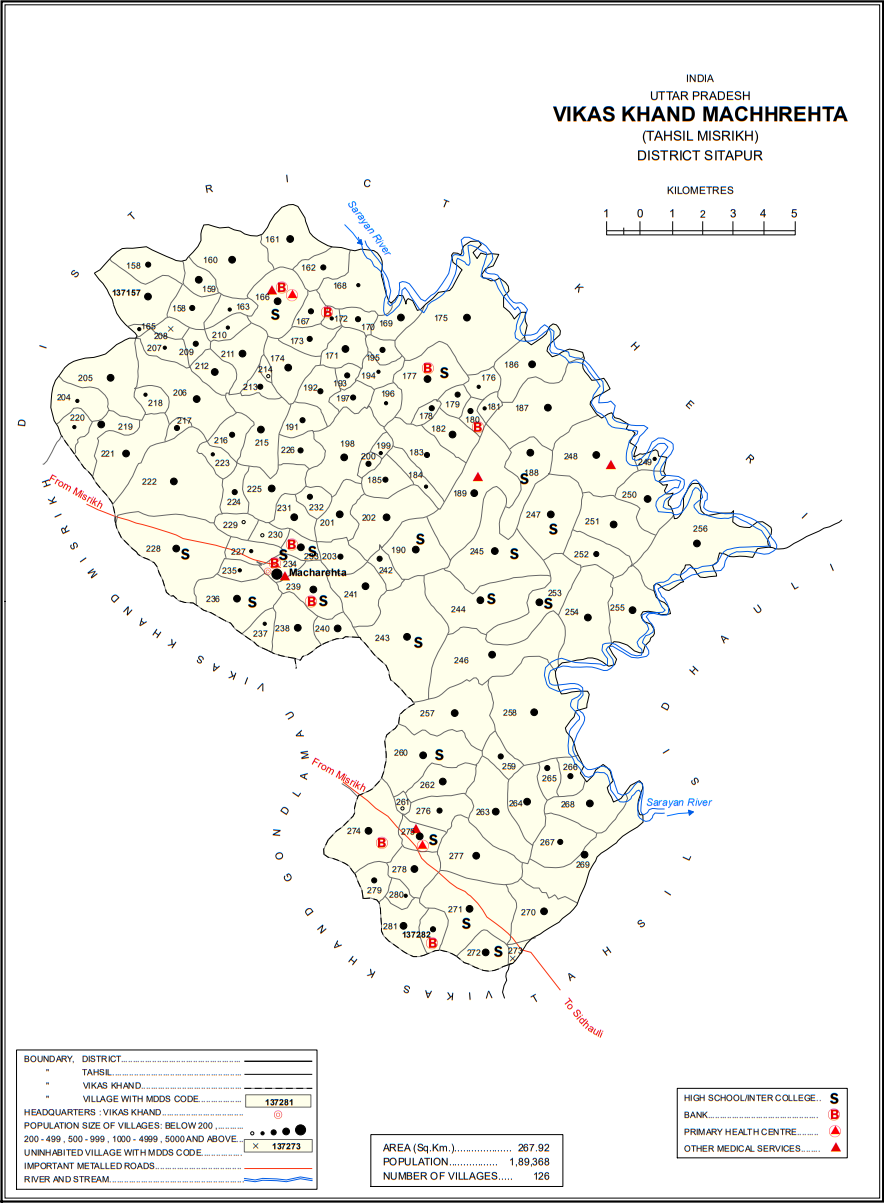
- Location of Machhrehta in Machhrehta block

- Location in Uttar Pradesh, India Machhrehta (India)
- Coordinates: 27.41632°N 80.64041°E
- Country: India
- State: Uttar Pradesh
- District: Sitapur
- Tehsil: Misrikh

Government
  - Body: Bharatiya Janata Party

Area
  - Total: 0.938 km^{2} (0.362 sq mi)
- Elevation: 139 m (456 ft)

Population (2011)
  - Village: 6,379
  - Block: 188,213

Languages
  - Official: Hindi
- Time zone: UTC+5:30 (IST)
- PIN Code: 261405

Machhrehta is a corresponding community development block of Misrikh tehsil in Sitapur district, Uttar Pradesh, India. The block is situated near Naimisharanya, a significant spiritual and pilgrimage site in India. Naimisharanya, also known as Neemsar, holds immense religious importance in Hindu mythology and is mentioned in several ancient scriptures, including the Mahabharata and the Puranas. It is believed to be the place where sages gathered to perform a thousand-year sacrificial ritual (yagna) to purify the world. Naimisharanya is renowned for its temples, sacred ponds, and the Chakra Tirtha, a revered water body where devotees take holy dips. The proximity of Machhrehta to such a prominent spiritual center enhances its cultural and historical significance, attracting numerous pilgrims and tourists to the area.

As of 2011, the population of Machhrehta was 6,379, in 1,119 households.

== History ==
Machhrehta, founded during the reign of the Mughal emperor Akbar, was named after a sadhu named Machhandar Nath who had lived in a place called "Tap-Bhumi" (ascetic place). During this period, it was demarcated as a pargana by Todar Mal. According to Kayastha oral tradition, the chief landowner at this time was an Abhan raja named Kesri Singh, who was deposed by Akbar. The lands were then granted to two Kayasthas, Bal Chand and Bir Chand, whose father, Parasram, had served as dewan for Kesri Singh but was executed by him. After Bal Chand and Bir Chand died, their lands were not inherited by their descendants, leading to various zamindars holding the pargana's lands. C.S. Ferrar noted in 1877 that this story was "very similar to that told respecting Khairabad" and should be taken with a grain of salt.

In 1767, the grandfather of Ali Naqi Khan, who would later serve as dewan to the King of Oudh, received the pargana of Machhrehta as a jagir, holding it for 42 years. By Ferrar's time, 99 of the pargana's villages were held by Rajput zamindars. Of the remaining 26 villages, 7½ were held by Mir Muhammad Husen Khan, the taluqdar of Rajpura, who was the pargana's sole taluqdar. Mir Muhammad Husen Khan had acquired Rajpura, along with Kuli in the neighboring pargana of Kurauna, via mortgage in 1262 fasli (1852 CE).

Ferrar described the town in his day as having 9 Hindu temples, including one next to a large tank called "Hardwar Tirath". This tank was considered holy, and every year during the month of Phagan, around two or three thousand devotees would bathe here to wash away their sins. There were also 4 mosques at that time, and a relatively recent imambara.

== Demographics ==
The sex ratio of Machhrehta block in 2011 was 875, which was lower than the rural average of Sitamau district. In the 0-6 age group, the sex ratio was higher at 921, which was above the district rural average. Members of scheduled castes made up 45.05% of block residents, while members of scheduled tribes made up 0.01%. The block literacy rate was 65.01% (75.92% among men and 52.44% among women); the gender literacy gap of 23.48% was the highest in Sitamau district.

Most workers in Machhrehta block were employed in agriculture in 2011, with 41.87% being cultivators who owned or leased their own land and another 38.88% being agricultural labourers who worked someone else's land for wages. 4.93% of workers were household industry workers, and the remaining 14.32% were other workers. The workforce was overwhelmingly male (50,644 men and 9,959 women); a greater proportion of men were employed as cultivators than women (44.67% vs. 27.62%), and the same was true for agricultural labourers (40.11% vs. 32.64%). A greater proportion of women than men were employed as household industry workers (14.92% vs. 2.97%) and other workers (24.81% vs. 12.25%), although due to the raw numbers involved men outnumbered women in all four categories of workers.

== Notable people ==
- Ashok Kumar Rawat (Sansad), Parliament MP
- Anju Bala (Poorv Sansad), Former Parliament MP
- Ramkrishna Bhargava (Vidhayak), Assembly MLA
- Manish Rawat (Vidhayak), Assembly MLA
- Hargovind Bhargava

== Photo Gallery ==
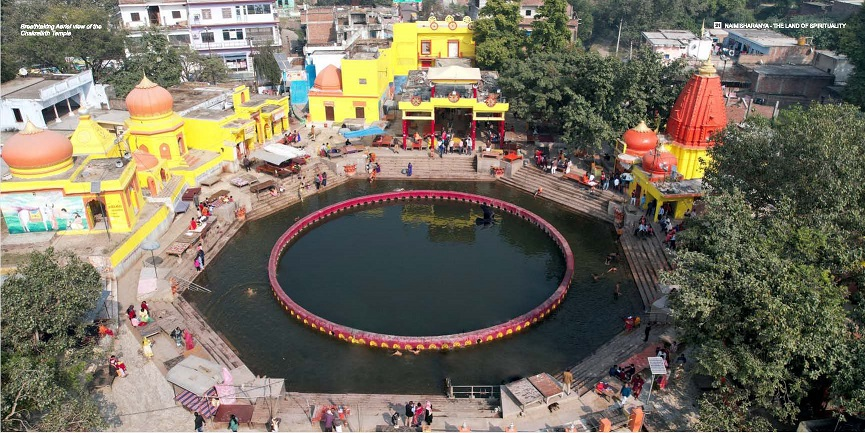
Naimisharanya (Neemsar)

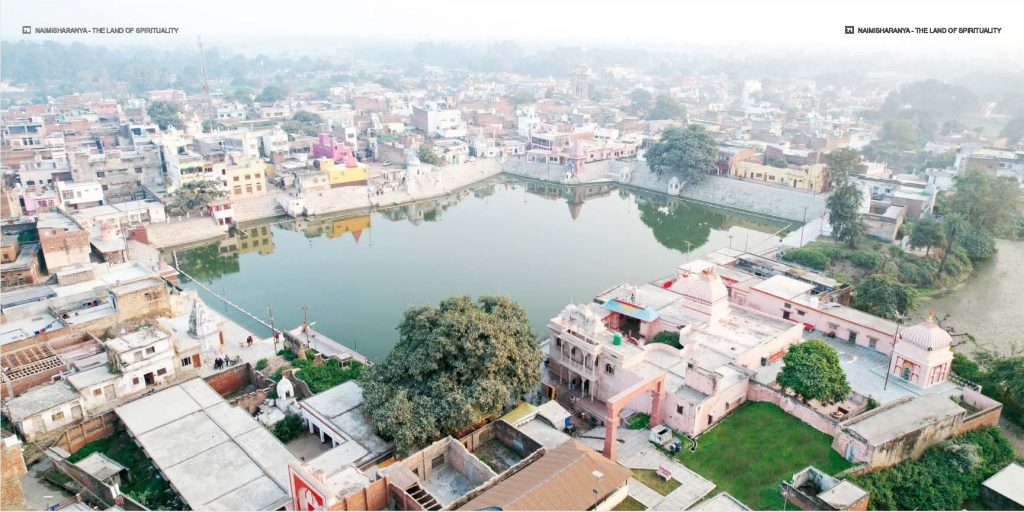
Naimisharanya (Neemsar)

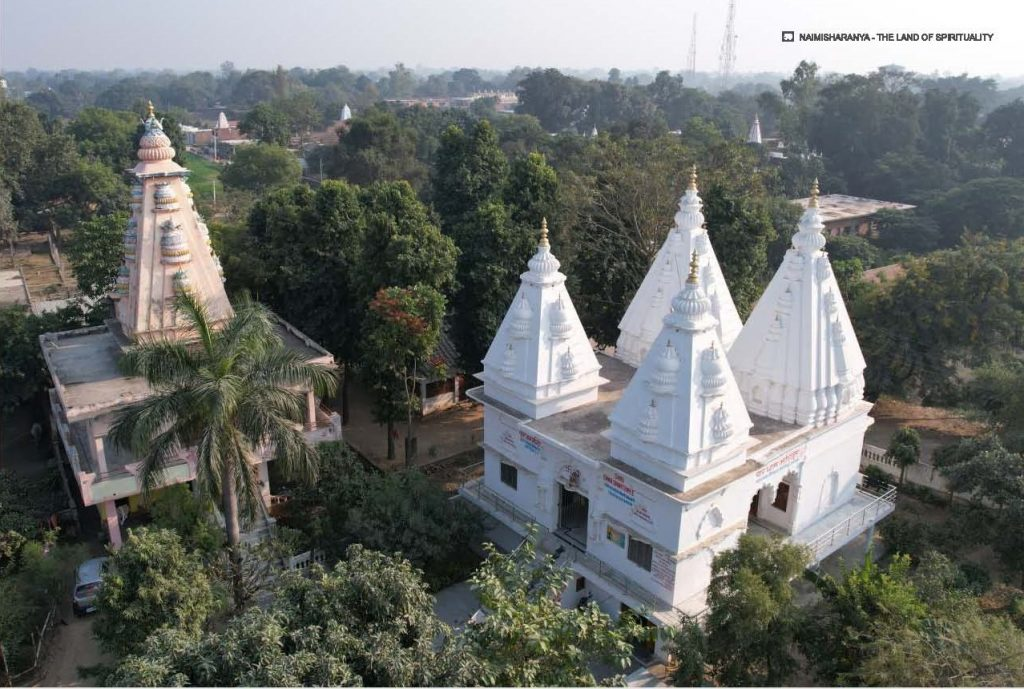
Naimisharanya (Neemsar)

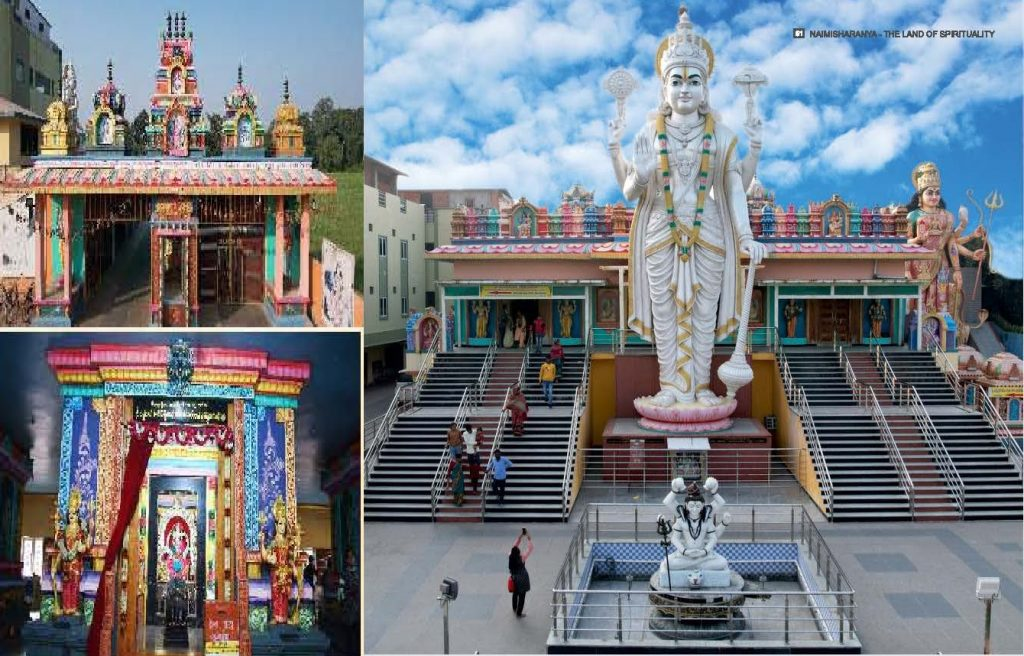
Naimisharanya (Neemsar)

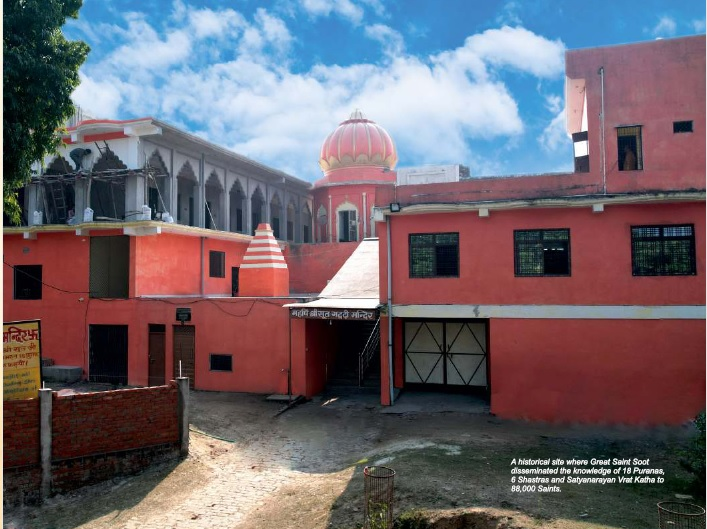
Naimisharanya (Neemsar)

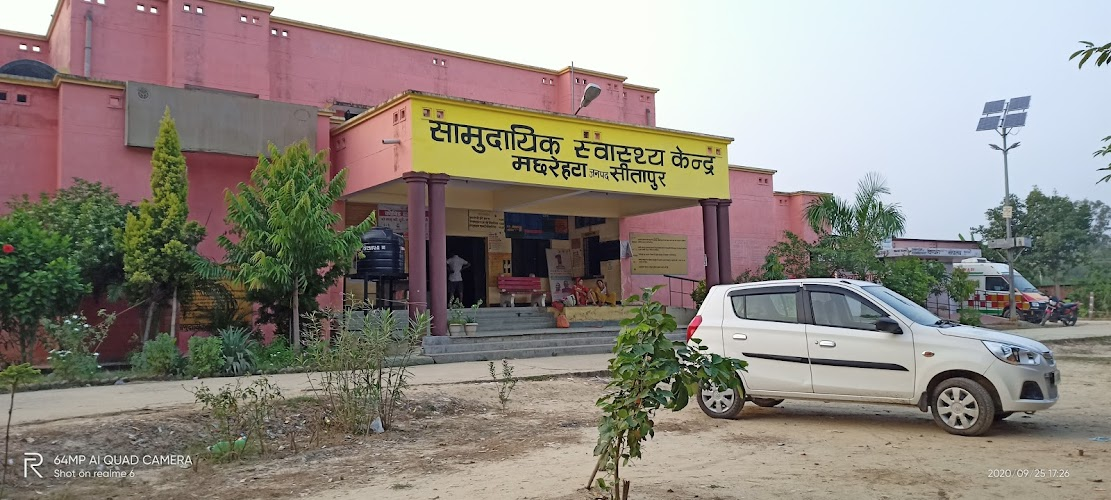
Public Health Centre Machhrehta

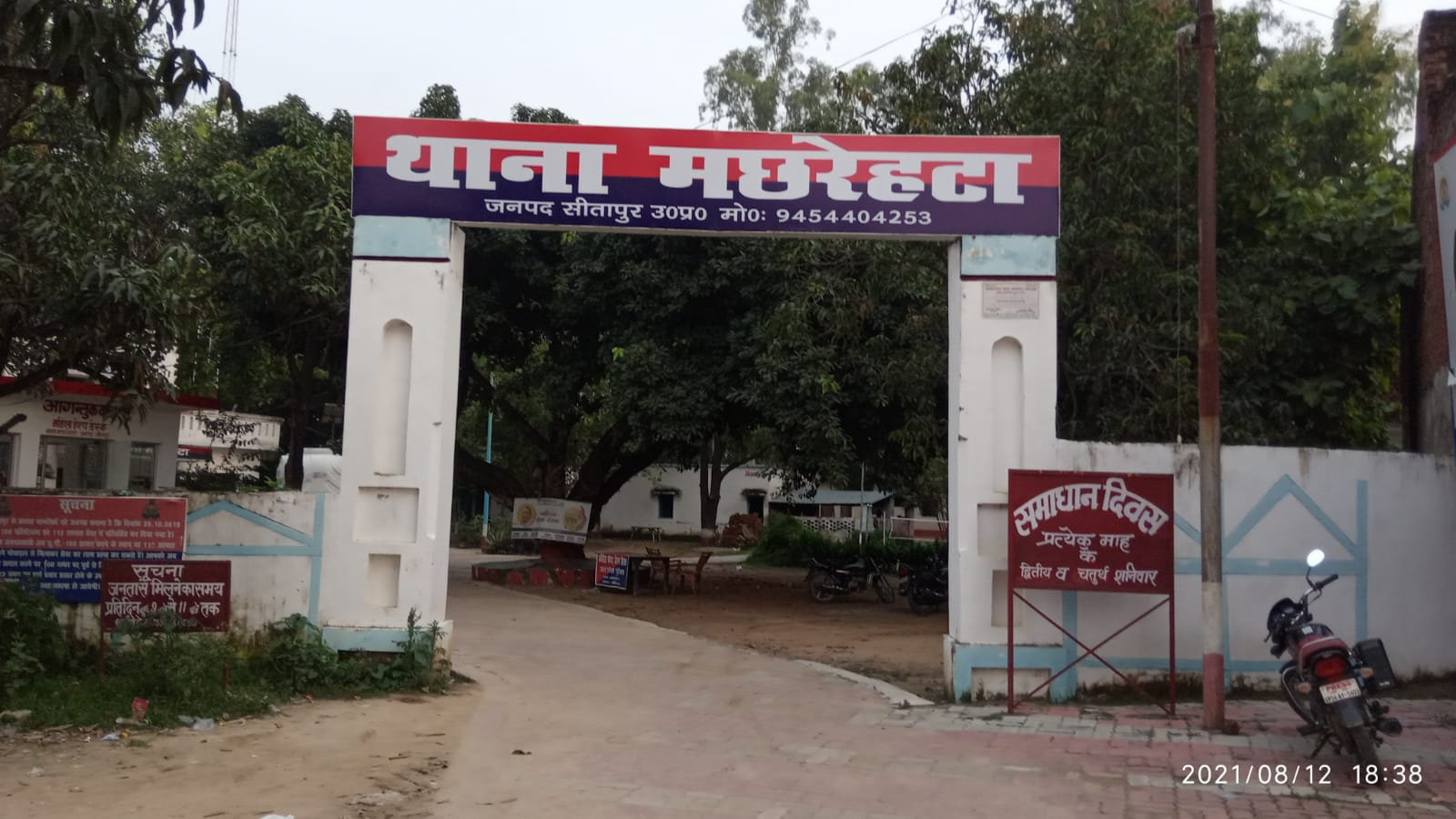
Machhrehta Police Station

== Villages ==
Machhrehta block contains the following 126 villages:

Village name	Total land area (hectares)	Population (in 2011)
Ahamad Nagar	66.5	219
Akilpur	75.9	770
Anogi	435.5	3,326
Bahoranpurawa	154.3	1,430
Banarawa	641	4,540
Baniya Mau	530	3,803
Bar Chandpur	97	932
Bare Para	150.7	729
Barsandhia	68.2	604
Behara Khalsa	46.2	724
Behara Mafi	53.4	0
Belandapur	231.1	1,963
Belawa	369.8	2,399
Bhade Bhar	366.7	1,957
Bhaisa Dagha	30.5	198
Bhakutta	29.7	480
Bhatpurwa	42.5	449
Bhaupur	40.3	508
Bhaupur	227.3	1,171
Bhidhaura	328.9	2,442
Bhitthepur	37.1	20
Bihat Biram	388.1	2,852
Bijuwa Mau	498.5	2,392
Bikarmpur	100.4	681
Brrha Deha	67.7	369
Chitehata	195	1,426
Dadeora	281.6	1,862
Dakhyia	350.4	2,159
Dalel Nagar	72.8	1,091
Damodarpur	26.1	124
Dengara	264.9	2,512
Deopara	128.4	1,036
Dhawarpara	369.8	2,330
Ditua	121.2	766
Dughra	176.5	867
Etova	293.9	1,264
Fattepur	470.5	4,481
Firojpur	96.6	428
Gandhariya	315.9	2,294
Gangapur	110.7	505
Garhi	267.4	2,377
Gauria	760.1	4,205
Ghaghpur	35.8	220
Gonda	328.1	2,584
Gopalpur	130.8	665
Gujarehata	233.2	1,355
Gumata	96.1	712
Halupur	43.4	325
Haradoyia	116.9	476
Hariharpur	81.1	683
Haripalpur	365	2,276
Harraiya	68.7	382
Has Khera	99.6	634
Herapur	322.5	2,498
Hisampur Chamra	52.2	295
Hisampur Jakariya	112.4	659
Jagadishpur	96.4	602
Jairampur	40.4	451
Jale Para	235.6	1,637
Jamalpur (N)	84	698
Jamlapur (S)	82.5	337
Jutpurwa	355.2	1,710
Kakori	200.2	1,052
Kandvapur	159	1,453
Katia	231.8	2,095
Katra	79.9	711
Kesra	255.7	1,977
Kinhoti	340.2	3,021
Kondri	382.8	2,534
Kunhera Laxmi Rampur	200.3	2,038
Lahungpur	220.4	1,870
Lalpur	298.3	1,613
Lauli	209.7	1,429
Machhrehta (block headquarters)	93.8	6,379
Madar	489	3,013
Madhawapur	689.6	3,354
Mahmoodpur	30.1	251
Marhia Eyarail	31	208
Masuri	179.1	690
Matasiya Lakhnsepur	55.4	108
Milik	32.6	521
Mirachouri	549.6	4,338
Mirajapur Daxini	180.1	1,316
Mirjapur	126.1	1,289
Misrapur	74.8	313
Nathapur	108.8	663
Nevada Khourd	97.4	614
Nevadiya	56.7	640
Newada Kala	176.4	1,197
Nighua Mau	244.8	1,421
Padari	55.4	287
Paharpur	550.2	2,263
Paidapur	177.8	1,200
Pande Khera	21.2	607
Parsada	298.8	2,875
Pawlavar	240.8	1,761
Peyariya Kondar	226.1	1,632
Phateha Nagar	691.4	4,777
Purayni	109	820
Raja Gaon	484.6	3,308
Rajepara	680.8	4,731
Rajpur Kharg	114.6	705
Rajpur Pratap	246.4	788
Ralamau	466.1	3,694
Rampur	181	1,580
Ramuwapur	354.6	1,804
Rasulpur	51.4	314
Rathourpur	77.8	1,137
Sadila	340.4	2,586
Sahapur	95.4	809
Sahsapur	167.3	1,308
Sakarara	432.8	2,768
Saraiya	49.5	517
Senpur	557.5	4,302
Sherpur	37.5	234
Sikandarpur	92.2	702
Sirdharpur	42.2	440
Sisendi	636	3,376
Surjanpur	80.4	697
Tajpur (N)	64.8	421
Tajpur Daxini	38.3	0
Umrapur	327.9	1,694
Uttarthor	417.7	3,565
Yarpur	61.5	519

== Polling Stations/Booths Near Machhrehta ==
1. Girls J.h.s Machhrehta
2. J.h.s. Binoura R.no. 2
3. P.s. Barmi
4. P.s. Gohilari
5. P.s. Karsenda
