= Yarpur =

Yarpur may refer to:

- Yarpur, Nalanda, a village in Nalanda district, Bihar, India
- Yarpur, Sitapur, a village in Sitapur district, Uttar Pradesh, India
- Yarpur, Ambedkar Nagar, a village in Ambedkar Nagar district, Uttar Pradesh, India
