= Dadhichi =

Sage in Hindu scriptures

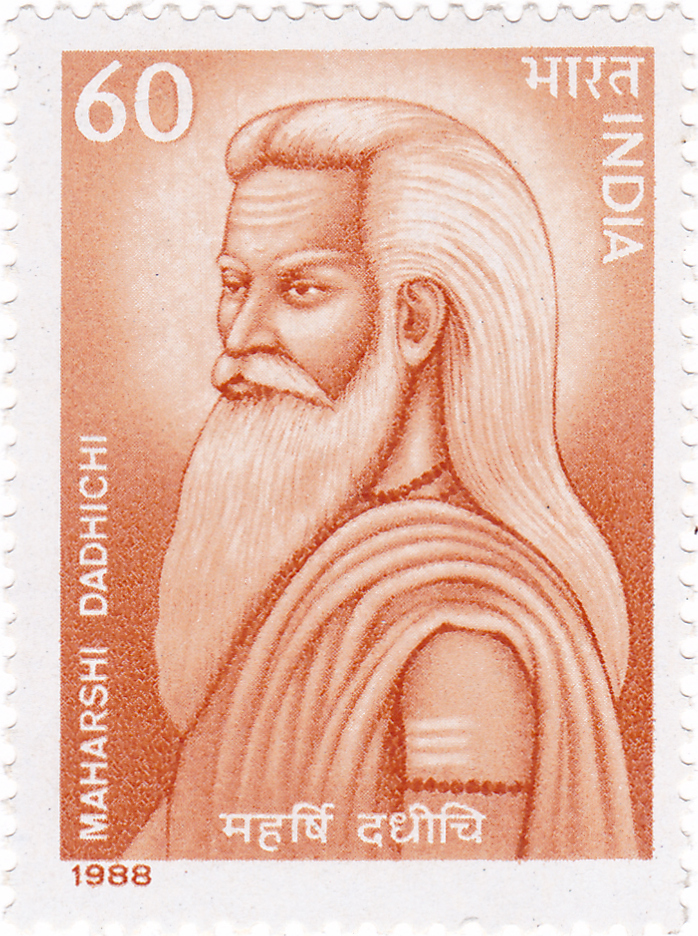
- Dadhichi, featured on an Indian stamp
- Affiliation: Rishi, Shaivism
- Texts: Rigveda, Puranas, Ramayana

Genealogy
- Parents: Atharvan (father), Chitti (mother)
- Consort: Suvarcas
- Children: Pippalada

Dadhichi (Sanskrit: दधीचि, romanized: Dadhīci), also rendered Dadhyanga and Dadhyancha, is a sage in Hinduism. He is best known for his sacrifice in the Puranas, where he gives up his life so that his bones could be used to manufacture the Vajra, the diamond-like celestial thunderbolt of the deity Indra, in order to slay Vritra.

== Literature ==
In the Bhagavata Purana, Dadhichi is described as the son of the rishi Atharvan and his wife, Chitti. Atharvan is said to be the author of Atharvaveda, which is one of the four Vedas. Chitti was the daughter of the sage Kardama.

The names of Dadhichi's wife and son were Suvarcas and Pippalada, respectively. After the death of Dadhichi, when Suvarcas was about to ascend the funeral pyre, she heard an aśarīriṇī vāṇī (a disembodied voice) that informed her that she was pregnant. Suvarcas removed the foetus from her womb with a stone, and placed it near a banyan tree, proceeding to end her life. Her child, Pippalada, became a famous rishi, associated with the Pippalada school of thought in Hinduism, and he is best known for being attributed with the Praśna Upanishad.

Dadhichi is also mentioned in various hymns (Richas–Suktas) of the Rigveda.

== Legend ==
Dadhichi is featured in many Hindu legends.

=== Horse-head legend ===
According to the Rigveda, when Dadhichi resided in Devaloka, he observed that the earth was populated by numerous asuras. He urged Indra to destroy them, and towards this endeavour, offered him a head of a horse, which he had located in a lake in the country of Śaraṇya. Using the bones taken from the horse's head, the duo destroyed a number of asuras.

In a variation of this legend featured in the Jaiminya Brahmana, the devas are said to have refused to bestow the Aśvaśira mantra of the Vedas to the Ashvini Twins. They declared that the being who would divulge this secret to the twins would have their head burst into a thousand pieces. The twin doctors of medicine sought out the sage Dadhichi, who offered to divulge this mantra. He only asked that the Ashvins replace his head with one of a horse when he reaped the consequences of the curse. After teaching them the mantra, the sage's head burst, and the twins carried out his request, and hence restored his life.

=== Conflict with Kṣuva ===
The Shiva Purana and Linga Purana features the sage as a friend of the splendid King Kṣuva, a great devotee of Vishnu. Once, the two were embroiled in a dispute regarding the superiority of knowledge which is sought by the Brahmins over weapons and force sought by the kings. Angered that the king would express an opinion that was contrary to the scriptures, Dadhichi struck the head of Kṣuva with his left fist. In retaliation, the king employed the Vajra to disintegrate the sage. The sage remembered Shukra, his ancestor, and the narrator of this legend, who employed his yogic powers to restore Dadhichi's limbs, and taught him the Mahāmṛtyuñjaya mantra to propitiate Shiva. When appeased, the deity appeared to offer the sage any boon of his choice, and Dadhichi wished for three: indestructible bones, immortality, and freedom from distress. Having received these boons, Dadhichi kicked the king with the root of his foot. Kṣuva appealed to Vishnu to bless him with victory.

Vishnu assumed the guise of a Brahmin, and appeared before Dadhichi, requesting the sage to grant him a boon. Dadhichi saw through Vishnu's guise, and wished to know the deity's purpose of visiting him. He was requested to make peace with the king. Dadhichi refused with a laugh, which angered Vishnu. The preserver deity summoned Indra and the devas, who attacked the sage, but their prowess was rendered futile because of Shiva's protection of the sage. The sage employed a few blades of the kusha grass against the divinities, which transformed into a trishula, frightening all but Vishnu from the scene. When the king appeared to offer his surrender, the sage once again affirmed that knowledge is superior to weapons and force. He cursed Indra and all the devas to be destroyed by Shiva, which would be fulfilled when they attended Daksha's yajna.

=== Legend of the Vajrayudha ===
According to the Devi Bhagavata Purana, Tvastar, the Prajapati, bore a deep-seated hatred for Indra, the king of the devas. He performed a penance to bear a child named Viśvarūpa, whose purpose was to slay Indra. The child grew to become a rishi, and since his mother, Racanā, was a daitya, he freely mingled with the asuras. Indra considered this blasphemous, and promptly destroyed the three heads of Viśvarūpa. Enraged by the loss of his son, Tvastar burnt offerings and offered incantations from the Atharvaveda for eight continuous days, until a son named Vritra appeared before him, and was tasked with slaying Indra.

Indra and his devas waged war on Vrita and the asuras, and were defeated. The devas went to seek the aid of Vishnu. Vishnu revealed to Indra that only weapons made from the thunder-containing bones of the sage Dadhichi could kill Vritra. Indra and the other devas therefore approached the sage, whom Indra had once slain, and asked him for his aid in defeating Vritra. Dadhichi acceded to the devas' request, but said that he wished that he had time to go on a pilgrimage to all the holy rivers before he gave up his life for them. Indra then brought all the water of the holy rivers together at Naimisharanya, thereby allowing the sage to have his wish fulfilled without a further loss of time. Dadhichi then went into a deep meditative state, and released his life force from his body. His bones were used to fashion the Vajra, also known as the Vajrayudha (Vajra, the weapon), which would be employed to slay Vritra.

Another version of this legend exists where Dadhichi was asked to safeguard the weapons of the devas, as they were unable to match the arcane arts being employed by the asuras to obtain them. Dadhichi is said to have kept at the task for a very long time and, finally tiring of the job, is said to have dissolved the weapons in sacred water, which he then drank. The devas returned some time later and asked him to return their weapons so that they might defeat the asuras, headed by Vritra, once and for all. Dadhichi, however, told them of what he had done and informed them that their weapons were now a part of his bones. Realising that his bones were the only way by which the devas could defeat the asuras, he willingly gave his life in a pit of mystical flames, that he summoned with the power of his austerities. Vishvakarma is then said to have fashioned a large number of weapons from Dadhichi's bones, including the Vajrayudha, which was fashioned from his spine. The devas are then said to have defeated the asuras using the weapons thus created.

=== Daksha's yajna ===
Dadhichi is said to have been the first to leave Daksha's yagna when he realised that Shiva had not been invited out of spite.

== In popular culture ==
Dadhichi is regarded to have had established his ashram in Misrikh, in Naimisharanya near Lucknow, in the state of Uttar Pradesh, India. Naimisharanya is cited in all of the Puranas as the location of his ashram, which is still in existence and Also another ancient ashram in Village - Daheli District - Sambhal, in the state of Uttar Pradesh . The current location of the Sabarmati Ashram in Ahmedabad is also believed to be one of the ancient sites of his ashram. A popular legend about Dahod also says that Sage Dadhichi once meditated at the banks of Dudhimati river in Dahod.

The Dadhich Brahmins, a Brahmin clan and the Dahiya Rajputs, a Rajput clan primarily found in Rajasthan, claim to be his descendants.

According to folklore, Dadhimati is the name of the sage's sister, in whose name a fourth century temple exists in Naguar, Rajasthan, called the Dadhimati Mata Temple.

The design of the Param Vir Chakra, India's highest military decoration, is regarded to be inspired by the sacrifice of this sage.

The mantra or incantation for the goddess Hinglaj is attributed to Dadhichi. To save some Kshatriya children from being killed by Parashurama, Dadhichi is said to have hidden them inside the temple of Hinglaj, and created the incantation of Hinglaj to protect them from Parashurama's wrath.

Dadhichi is believed to have written the Narayana Kavacham, a Sanskrit hymn.

== See also ==
- Bhrigu
- Atharvan
- Durvasa
- Hayagriva
