= CT Institute of Technology =

The CT Institute of Technology, is accredited by All India Council for Technical Education and affiliated to Punjab Technical University, is located at Shahpur (near Lambra) about 10.5 km (6.5 mi) from Jalandhar Bus Stand and 12.5 km (7.8 mi) from Jalandhar Railway Station.

The institute was established in 2008. It offers seats in disciplines; computer science engineering (CSE), electrical and electronics engineering (EEE), electronics and communication engineering (ECE) and information technology (IT) with the intake of 60 seats in each discipline. A new discipline, civil engineering, was added in 2009. The intake of students increased from 60 to 120 for ECE and CE in the year 2010.

== Departments ==
- Mechanical engineering
- Electrical and electronics engineering
- Civil engineering
- Computer science engineering
- Electronics and communication engineering
- Information technology
- Automobile Engineering
