= Misrikh Lok Sabha constituency =

Lok Sabha constituency in Uttar Pradesh

Coordinates: 27.43°N 80.52°E

Misrikh UP-32
- Lok Sabha constituency
- Interactive Map Outlining Misrikh Lok Sabha constituency

Constituency details
- Country: India
- Region: North India
- State: Uttar Pradesh
- Assembly constituencies: Misrikh; Bilgram-Mallanwan; Balamau; Sandila; Bilhaur
- Established: 1962
- Reservation: SC

Member of Parliament
- 18th Lok Sabha
- Incumbent Ashok Kumar Rawat
- Party: Bharatiya Janata Party
- Elected year: 2024

Misrikh Lok Sabha constituency is one of the 80 Lok Sabha (parliamentary) constituencies in Uttar Pradesh state in northern India.

== Assembly segments ==
Presently, Misrikh Lok Sabha constituency comprises five Vidhan Sabha (legislative assembly) segments. These are:

No	Name	District	Member	Party	2024 Lead
153	Misrikh (SC)	Sitapur	Ram Krishna Bhargava	BJP	SP
159	Bilgram-Mallanwan	Hardoi	Ashish Kumar Singh	BJP	BJP
160	Balamau (SC)	Hardoi	Ram Pal Verma	BJP	BJP
161	Sandila	Hardoi	Alka Singh Arkvanshi	BJP	BJP
209	Bilhaur (SC)	Kanpur Nagar	Rahul Bachha Sonkar	BJP	BJP

== Members of Parliament ==
Year	Member	Party
1962	Gokaran Prasad	Bharatiya Jana Sangh
1967	Sankta Prasad	Indian National Congress
1971	Sankta Prasad	Indian National Congress
1977	Ram Lal Rahi	Janata Party
1980	Ram Lal Rahi	Indian National Congress
1984	Sankta Prasad	Indian National Congress
1989	Ram Lal Rahi	Indian National Congress
1991	Ram Lal Rahi	Indian National Congress
1996	Paragi Lal	Bharatiya Janata Party
1998	Ram Shankar Bhargava	Bahujan Samaj Party
1999	Sushila Saroj	Samajwadi Party
2004	Ashok Kumar Rawat	Bahujan Samaj Party
2009	Ashok Kumar Rawat	Bahujan Samaj Party
2014	Anju Bala	Bharatiya Janata Party
2019	Ashok Kumar Rawat	Bharatiya Janata Party
2024	Ashok Kumar Rawat	Bharatiya Janata Party

== Election results ==
=== 2024 ===
2024 Indian general elections: Misrikh
Party	Candidate	Votes	%	±%
BJP	Ashok Kumar Rawat	475,016	45.15	▼6.90
SP	Sangita Rajwanshi	4,41,610	41.98	▲41.98
BSP	B. R. Ahirwar	1,11,945	10.64	▼31.61
NOTA	None of the Above	8,029	0.76	▼0.23
Majority		33,406	3.18	▼6.62
Turnout		10,51,983	56.01	▼1.16
BJP hold		Swing		

=== 2019 ===
2019 Indian general elections: Misrikh
Party	Candidate	Votes	%	±%
BJP	Ashok Kumar Rawat	534,429	52.05	
BSP	Neelu Satyarthi	4,33,757	42.25	
INC	Manjari Rahi	26,505	2.58	
PSP(L)	Arun Kumari Kori	2,442	0.24	
NOTA	None of the Above	10,181	0.99	
Majority		1,00,642	9.80	
Turnout		10,27,382	57.17	
BJP hold		Swing		

=== 2014 ===
2014 Indian general elections: Misrikh
Party	Candidate	Votes	%	±%
BJP	Anju Bala	412,575	41.33	
BSP	Ashok Kumar Rawat	3,25,212	32.58	
SP	Jai Prakash	1,94,759	19.51	
INC	Om Prakash	33,075	3.31	
Independent	Hans Mukhi Katheria	8,635	0.86	
NOTA	None of the Above	9,633	0.96	
Majority		87,363	8.75	
Turnout		9,98,314	57.85	
BJP gain from BSP		Swing		

== See also ==
- Sitapur district
- Hardoi district
- List of constituencies of the Lok Sabha
