= Sankata Prasad =

Indian politician

Member of Parliament, Rajya Sabha
- In office 1982–1984
- Constituency: Uttar Pradesh

Member of Parliament, Lok Sabha
- In office 1967–1977
- Preceded by: Gokaran Prasad
- Succeeded by: Ram Lal Rahi
- In office 1984–1989
- Preceded by: Ram Lal Rahi
- Succeeded by: Ram Lal Rahi
- Constituency: Misrikh, Uttar Pradesh

Personal details
- Born: 28 March 1927 Akhtiyarpur, Sitapur district, United Provinces, British India(present-day Uttar Pradesh, India)
- Died: 23 March 1992 (aged 64)
- Party: Indian National Congress
- Spouse: Sheo Rani
- Children: 2 Sons and 3 daughters

Sankata Prasad also spelt Sankta Prasad was an Indian politician. He was a Member of Parliament, representing Uttar Pradesh in the Rajya Sabha, the upper house of India's Parliament representing the Indian National Congress.
