= Dadhichi Ashram =

Hermitage of Dadhichi Rishi

- दधीचि आश्रम
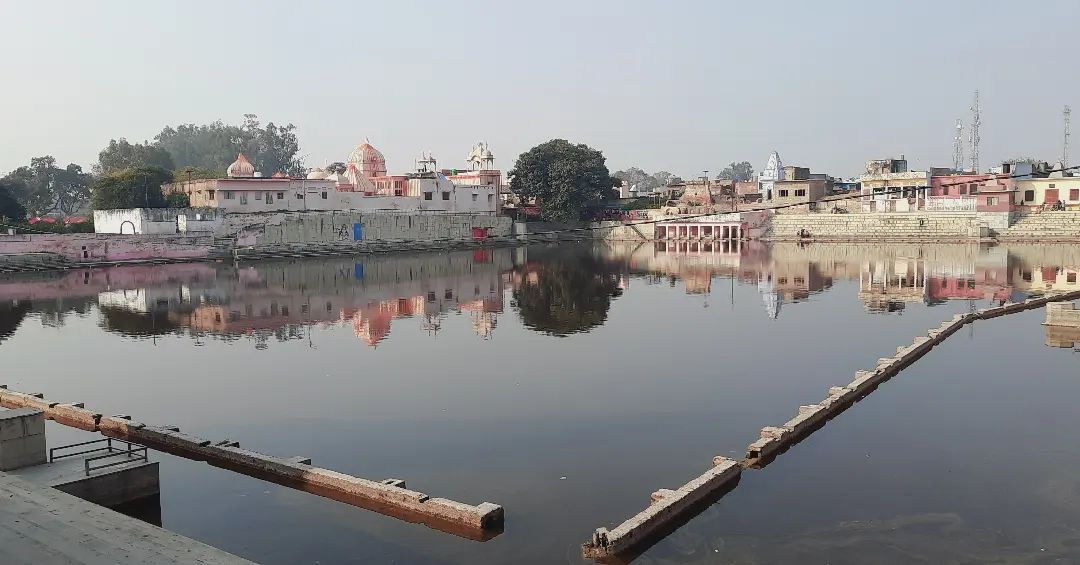
- View of the legendary Dadhichi Ashram having a sacred pond Dadhichi Kund in the premises

Monastery information
- Full name: Dadhichi Rishi Ashram
- Other name: Hermitage of Dadhichi
- Order: Hinduism
- Established: Satya Yuga

People
- Founder: Dadhichi

Site
- Location: Misrikh, Sitapur district, Uttar Pradesh
- Country: India
- Visible remains: Dadhichi Kund
- Other information: Other locations - Dahiyawan in Chhapra and Sabarmati river bank in Ahmedabad.

Dadhichi Ashram (Sanskrit: दधीचि आश्रम) refers to the Gurukul and residential hermitage of the Vedic sage Dadhichi in the Indian subcontinent. It is located in the town of Misrikh in the Sitapur district of Uttar Pradesh. Presently there is a legendary pond known as Dadhichi Kund in the premises of the ashram. It is mentioned in the Hindu texts Puranas, Mahabharata and Bhagawatam. It is the part of Naimisharanya Teertha in the region. It is regarded as a revered pilgrimage for Hindu adherents. Nowadays, Hindu adherents come here to perform holy bath in the kund of the ashram.

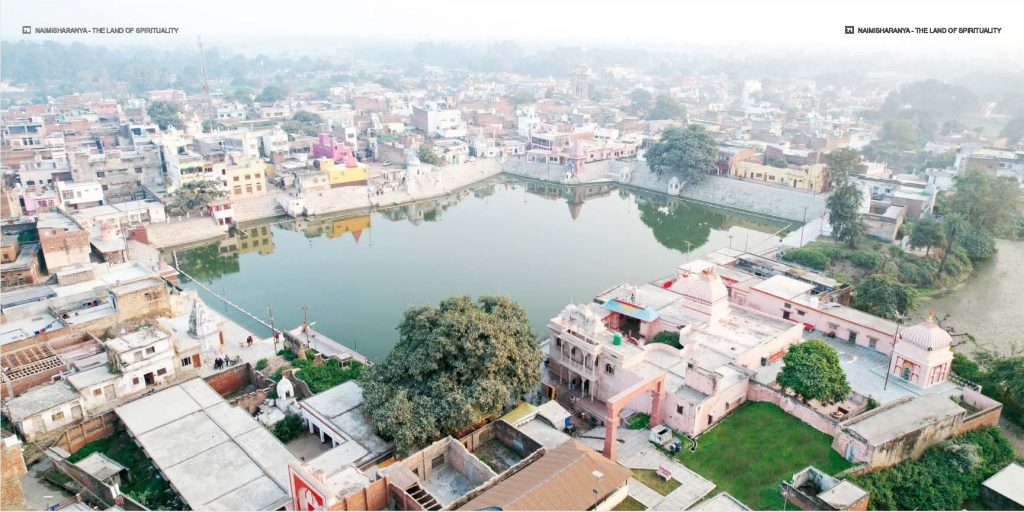
Arial view of the Dadhichi Ashram Teertha Kshetra at Neemsar of Naimisharanya.

== Description ==
In the tradition of Hinduism, Dadhichi is regarded as a revered Rishi. He is popularly known for the donation of his own bones to Lord Devaraj Indra.

The legendary legacy of the revered sage is preserved at several locations in the subcontinent. Apart from the location of Naimisharanya forest, the other major Dadhichi Ashram is located at Dahiyawan in the city of Chhapra in the Bihar state of India. It is believed as a taposthali of Dadhichi Rishi and been given the shape of a temple. It is an ancient temple and nowadays called as Umanath Mandir.

Similarly, at a bank of the Sabarmati river in the city of Ahmedabad in the Gujarat state, there is a legendary ashram known as Dadhichi Ashram.
