= Yarpur, Sitapur =

Village in Sitapur district, Uttar Pradesh, India

Yarpur
- Village
- Location in Uttar Pradesh, India Yarpur (India)
- Coordinates: 27.4618°N 80.6310°E
- Country: India
- State: Uttar Pradesh
- District: Sitapur
- Tehsil: Misrikh

Population (2011)
  - Total: 519
- Time zone: UTC+05:30 (IST)

Yarpur is a village in Misrikh tehsil, Sitapur district, Uttar Pradesh, India. The population was 519 at the 2011 Indian census.
