= Atharvan =

Author of Atharvaveda in Hinduism

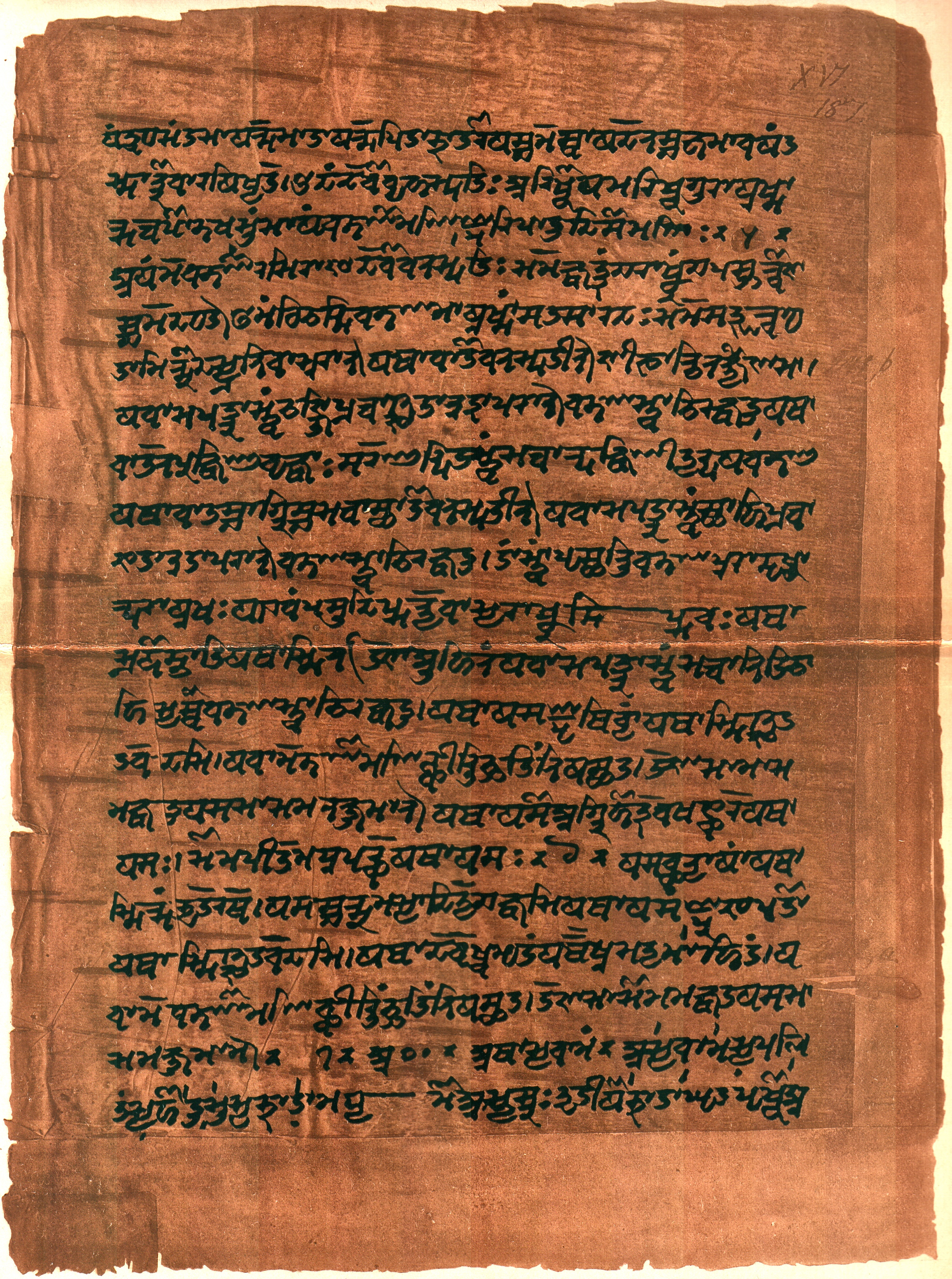
- Atharva Veda written by Atharvan

In-universe information
- Family: Brahma (father)
- Children: Dadhichi, Dadhimati

Atharvan (Sanskrit: अथर्वन् IAST: Atharvan, nominative singular: अथर्वा IAST: Atharvā) is a legendary Vedic sage (rishi) of Hinduism, who along with Angiras, is supposed to have authored ("heard") the Atharvaveda. He is described as being the first to use fire, first to offer soma, and is said to have first instituted the fire-sacrifice or yajña. Consequently, he was called 'the father of fire.' Sometimes he is also reckoned among the seven seers, the Saptarishi. His clan is known as the Atharvanas. Atharvan married Shanti, daughter of Prajapati Kardama, and had a great sage Dadhichi as a son. He is referred to as a member of the Bhrigu clan.

According to the Mundaka Upanishad and other texts, he was the eldest son and (Manasaputra) born from mind of the creator deity, Brahma.

== Etymology ==
The Atharva Veda may be named, states Monier Williams, after the mythical priest named Atharvan who was first to develop prayers to fire, offer Soma, and who composed "formulas and spells intended to counteract diseases and calamities". The name Atharva Veda, states Laurie Patton, is for the text being "Veda of the Atharvāṇas".

The oldest name of the text, according to its own verse 10.7.20, was Atharvangirasah, a compound of "Atharvan" and "Angiras", both Vedic scholars. Each scholar called the text after itself, such as Saunakiya Samhita, meaning the "compiled text of Saunakiya". The "Atharvan" and "Angiras" names, states Maurice Bloomfield, imply different things, with the former considered auspicious while the latter implying hostile sorcery practices. Over time, the positive auspicious side came to be celebrated and the name Atharva Veda became widespread. The latter name Angiras which is linked to Agni and priests in the Vedas, states George Brown, may also be related to Indo-European Angirôs found in an Aramaic text from Nippur.

== Indo-Iranian Avestan Comparison ==
Vedic atharvan is cognate with Avestan āθrauuan / aθaurun, "priest", but the etymology of the term is not yet conclusively established. It was once thought to be etymologically related to the Avestan ātar. It has been suggested by scholars that the Vedic and Avestan terms are not of Indo-European origin, and are derived from the BMAC substrate. Michael Witzel states the etymology of Atharvan is Proto Indo-Iranian *atharwan "[ancient] priest, sorcerer", and it is cognate to Avestan āθrauuan "priest" and possibly related to Tocharian *athr, "superior force".

== See also ==
- Atharva Veda
- Vedic priesthood
- Dadhichi
- Manasaputra
