= Anju Bala =

Indian politician

Member of Parliament, Lok Sabha
- In office 26 May 2014 – 24 May 2019
- Preceded by: Ashok Kumar Rawat
- Succeeded by: Ashok Kumar Rawat
- Constituency: Misrikh

Personal details
- Born: 6 September 1979 (age 46) Kathua, Jammu and Kashmir, India
- Party: Independent
- Other political affiliations: Bharatiya Janata Party (expelled in February 2022)
- Spouse: Krishna Kumar Singh
- Children: 2 (1 son, 1 daughter)
- Education: Chhatrapati Shahu Ji Maharaj University (M.A.); University of Jammu (M.A.)
- Profession: Industrialist, Agriculturist, Civil Servant, Builder

Anju Bala (born 6 September 1979) is an Indian politician who has been a Member of Lok Sabha for the Misrikh constituency since the 2014 Indian general election. Bala entered active politics in 2010 and was elected the Block Pramukh (president) of Mallawan. Three years later, she joined the Bharatiya Janata Party and was elected to the Lok Sabha the following year. She is a postgraduate in Hindi and Sanskrit. Her husband Krishna Kumar Singh is a former legislator in the Uttar Pradesh Legislative Assembly. In February 2022 she was expelled from Bharatiya Janata Party.

== Early life ==
Anju Bala was born on 6 September 1979 at Kathua, Jammu Kashmir to Ravinder Nath and Trishala Devi, both of whom belong to the Chamar caste. She completed her postgraduate education in Sanskrit at the University of Jammu in 2007. Three years later, she graduated from Chhatrapati Shahu Ji Maharaj University with a degree in Hindi.

== Political career ==
Bala participated in youth politics during her college life. In 2010, she was elected as block pramukh (president) of Mallawan. She said her husband persuaded her to contest the block pramukh and parliamentary elections.

In 2013, Bala joined the Bharatiya Janata Party. In the 2014 Indian general election, she contested Misrikh constituency and defeated her nearest rival Ashok Kumar Rawat of the Bahujan Samaj Party by a margin of 87,363 votes. Upon being elected, she said her first priorities as an MP were making herself available to the residents of her constituency, constructing new roads and ensuring a continuous supply of electricity.

On 26 February 2018, Bala adopted Tejipur village under a rural development program called Sansad Adarsh Gram Yojana. She had previously adopted Sihordwar Shikoh and Islam Nagar villages.

During Bala's tenure as an MP, she used 90.21% of ₹17.5 crore (US$1.8 million) that was released under the Members of Parliament Local Area Development Scheme fund. On 22 March 2019, the party did not renominate her for the upcoming 2019 Indian general election.

In February 2022 she was expelled from Bharatiya Janata Party.

== Views ==
Bala believes violence against cows could be curbed by making them the national animal of India and in August 2017, she demanded this course of action in Lok Sabha. She is of the opinion that inflation can be controlled by regulating the prices of petroleum products. She also believes the promotion of agriculture will help create jobs, that education reduces poverty and that bringing youth into politics could help a new style of political thinking to emerge. Bala has supported banknote demonetisation because she thinks it would help authorities locate black money in India.

== Personal life ==
Bala married Krishna Kumar Singh of Uttar Pradesh on 26 January 2008. Singh represented Bilgram-Mallanwan Assembly constituency in the Uttar Pradesh Legislative Assembly from 2002 to 2012 as a member of Bahujan Samaj Party. They have two children.
