= Ram Pal Rajwanshi =

Indian politician

Ram Pal Rajvanshi राम पाल राजवंशी

MLA, 16th Legislative Assembly
- In office March 2012 – March 2017
- Preceded by: Anoop Kumar
- Succeeded by: Ram Krishna Bhargava
- Constituency: Misrikh

MLA, 15th Legislative Assembly
- In office May 2007 – Mar 2012
- Preceded by: Ram Krishana
- Succeeded by: None
- Constituency: Machhrehta

MLA, 13th Legislative Assembly
- In office Oct 1996 – Mar 2002
- Preceded by: Balgovind Rajvanshi
- Succeeded by: Ram Krishana
- Constituency: Machhrehta

Personal details
- Born: 1 May 1958 (age 68) Sitapur district
- Party: Samajwadi Party
- Other political affiliations: Janata Dal
- Spouse: Rama Devi (wife)
- Children: 3 sons & 2 daughters
- Parent: Mathura Prasad Rajwanshi (father)
- Education: Junior High School, Machhrehatta
- Profession: Politician & farmer

Ram Pal Rajwanshi (Hindi: राम पाल राजवंशी) is an Indian politician and a member of the 16th Legislative Assembly in India. He represents the Misrikh constituency of Uttar Pradesh and is a member of the Samajwadi Party political party.

== Early life and education ==
Ram Pal Rajwanshi was born in Sitapur district. He attended the junior high school in Madhrehatta and is educated till eighth grade. Ram Pal belongs to the scheduled caste community.

== Political career ==
Ram Pal Rajwanshi has been a MLA for three terms. He has also been Minister of State for two terms and has been the president of many communities and committees. He represented the Misrikh constituency and is a member of the Samajwadi Party political party.

== Posts held ==
#	From	To	Position	Comments
01	2012	2017	Member, 16th Legislative Assembly	
02	2007	2012	Member, 15th Legislative Assembly	
03	1996	2002	Member, 13th Legislative Assembly	

== See also ==
- Misrikh (Assembly constituency)
- Sixteenth Legislative Assembly of Uttar Pradesh
- Uttar Pradesh Legislative Assembly
