= Bihat Biram =

- Town
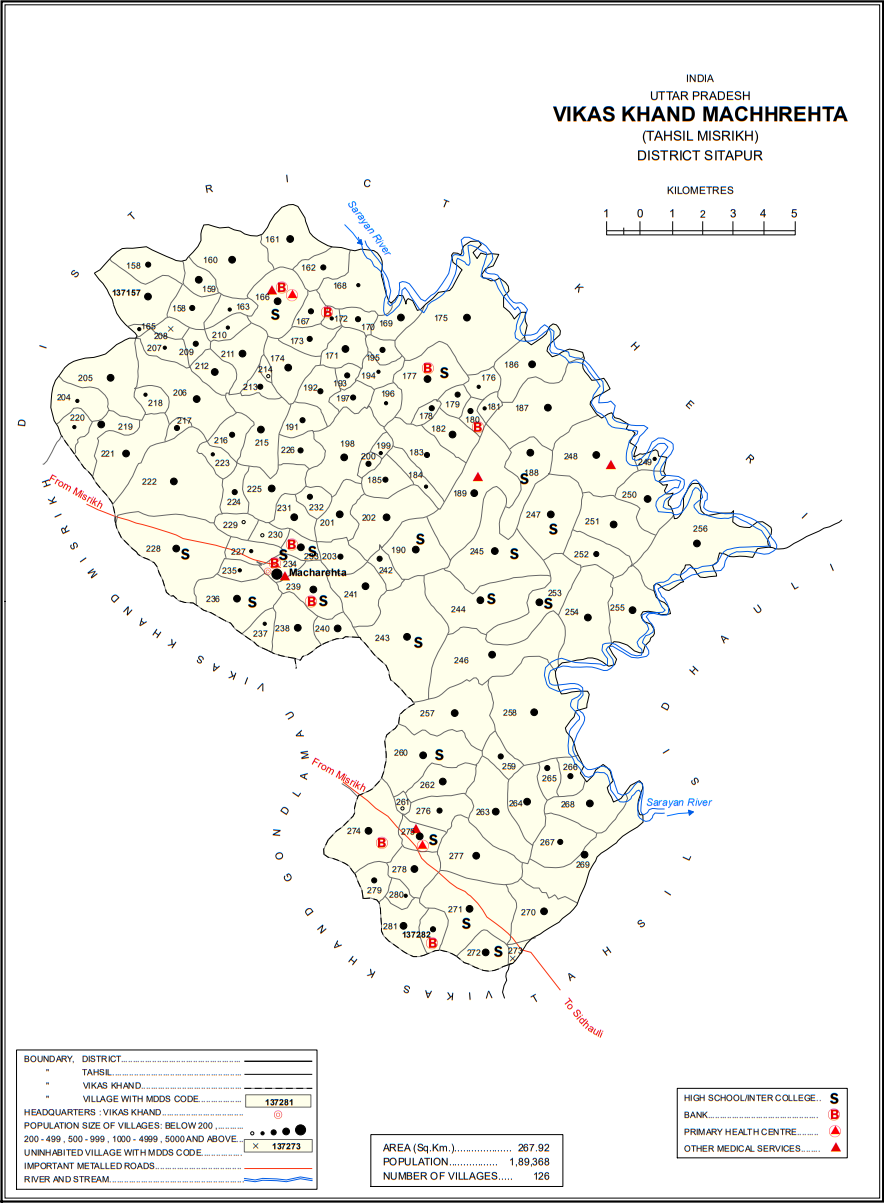
- Location of Bihat Biram (#198) in Machhrehta block

- Location in Uttar Pradesh, India Bihat Biram (India)
- Coordinates: 27.45209°N 80.66366°E
- Country: India
- State: Uttar Pradesh
- District: Sitapur

Area
  - Total: 0.3881 km^{2} (0.1498 sq mi)
- Elevation: 141 m (463 ft)

Population (2011)
  - Total: 2,852
  - Density: 7,349/km^{2} (19,030/sq mi)

Languages
  - Official: Hindi
- Time zone: UTC+5:30 (IST)
- PIN Code: 261405

Bihat Biram, also spelled Behat, is a village in Machhrehta block of Sitapur district, Uttar Pradesh, India. As of 2011, its population was 2,852, in 564 households.

== History ==
According to tradition, Bihat Biram was founded in 1459 by a Kachhwaha prince of Amer named Biram Singh, after whom the town was named. In the late 1800s, the village's Kachhwaha zamindars claimed descent from him, 11 generations later.
