= Bilgram-Mallanwan Assembly constituency =

Constituency of the Uttar Pradesh legislative assembly in India

Coordinates: 27.12°N 80.11°E

Bilgram-Mallanwan
- Constituency No. 159 for the Uttar Pradesh Legislative Assembly

Constituency details
- Country: India
- Region: North India
- State: Uttar Pradesh
- District: Hardoi
- Total electors: 3,81,886
- Reservation: None

Member of Legislative Assembly
- 18th Uttar Pradesh Legislative Assembly
- Incumbent Ashish Kumar Singh
- Party: BJP
- Elected year: 2017

Bilgram-Mallanwan is a constituency of the Uttar Pradesh Legislative Assembly covering the towns of Bilgram and Mallanwan, and other parts of Bilgram tehsil, in Hardoi district of Uttar Pradesh, India. Bilgram-Mallanwan is one of five assembly constituencies in the Misrikh Lok Sabha constituency. As of 2022, its representative is Ashish Kumar Singh of the Bharatiya Janata Party.

== Members of the Legislative Assembly ==
Election	Name	Party
2012	Brijesh Kumar Verma	Bahujan Samaj Party
2017	Ashish Kumar Singh	Bharatiya Janata Party
2022	Ashish Kumar Singh	Bharatiya Janata Party

== Election results ==
=== 2027 ===
2027 Uttar Pradesh Legislative Assembly election: Bilgram-Mallanwan
Party	Candidate	Votes	%	±%
INDIA				
NDA				
BSP				
NOTA	None of the above			
Majority				
Turnout				
gain from		Swing		

=== 2022 ===
2022 Uttar Pradesh Legislative Assembly election: Bilgram-Mallanwan
Party	Candidate	Votes	%	±%
BJP	Ashish Kumar Singh	82,075	34.96	−2.65
SP	Brijesh Kumar Verma	57,185	24.36	−9.63
INC	Subhash Pal	52,398	22.32	
BSP	Krishna Kumar Singh	35,764	15.23	−7.99
NOTA	None of the above	1,818	0.77	−0.06
Majority		24,890	10.6	+6.98
Turnout		234,764	61.47	−0.53
BJP hold		Swing		

=== 2017 ===
In 2017, Bharatiya Janata Party candidate Ashish Kumar Singh won in 2017 Uttar Pradesh Legislative Assembly election defeating Samajwadi Party candidate Subhash Pal by a margin of 8,025 votes.

2017 Uttar Pradesh Legislative Assembly Election: Bilgram-Mallanwa
Party	Candidate	Votes	%	±%
BJP	Ashish Kumar Singh	83,405	37.61	
SP	Subhash Pal	75,380	33.99	
BSP	Anurag Mishra	51,502	23.22	
AIMIM	Abdul Aziz	2,716	1.22	
NOTA	None of the above	1,826	0.83	
Majority		8,025	3.62	
Turnout		221,791	62.0	
