= Alka Singh Arkvanshi =

Indian politician

Member of Uttar Pradesh Legislative Assembly
- Incumbent
- Assumed office March 2022
- Preceded by: Raj Kumar Agrawal
- Constituency: Sandila

Personal details
- Born: 15 May 1979 (age 46) Lucknow, Uttar Pradesh
- Party: Bharatiya Janata Party
- Spouse: Anoop Singh
- Education: Master of Business Administration
- Alma mater: Allahabad Agriculture Institute
- Profession: Politician

Alka Singh Arkvanshi (born 15 May 1979) is an Indian politician from Uttar Pradesh. She is an MLA from Sandila Assembly constituency in Hardoi district. She represents of Bharatiya Janata party. She won the 2022 Uttar Pradesh Legislative Assembly election.

== Early life and education ==
Arkvanshi is from Sarojninagar, Lucknow district. She married Anoop Singh. She completed her M.B.A. at Allahabad Agriculture Institute in 2007.

== Career ==
Arkvanshi won the 2022 Uttar Pradesh Legislative Assembly election from Sandila Assembly constituency representing Bharatiya Janata Party. She polled 101,730 votes and defeated Abdul Mannan of BSP by a margin of 37,103 votes.
