= Gokaran Prasad =

Indian politician (1927–2006)

Member of Parliament, Lok Sabha
- In office 1962–1967
- Succeeded by: Sankata Prasad
- Constituency: Misrikh, Uttar Pradesh

Personal details
- Born: 8 September 1927 Pichhaura, Hargaon, Sitapur, India
- Died: 21 November 2006 (aged 79) Lucknow, India
- Party: Bharatiya Jana Sangh
- Spouse: Shivrani
- Children: 3

Gokaran Prasad (8 September 1927 – 21 November 2006) was an Indian politician. He was a Member of Parliament, representing Misrikh, Uttar Pradesh in the Lok Sabha, the lower house of India's Parliament representing the Bharatiya Jana Sangh.

Prasad died on 21 November 2006, at the age of 79.
