= I. K. Gujral Punjab Technical University =

State university in Jalandhar, Punjab, India

- Logo of the IKGPTU
- Former name: Punjab Technical University
- Motto: Propelling Punjab to a Prosperous Knowledge Society
- Type: State university
- Established: 16 January 1997; 29 years ago
- Accreditation: NAAC B
- Academic affiliations: UGC, AIU, AICTE, NAAC, COA, PCI
- Budget: ₹464.72 crore (US$48 million)
- Chairman: Chief Secretary, Government of Punjab
- Chancellor: Governor of Punjab
- Vice-Chancellor: Arvind Kumar Bansal
- Faculty: 67
- Undergraduates: 1226 (Main Campus)
- Postgraduates: 23 (Main Campus)
- Doctoral students: 74 (Main Campus)
- Location: IKGPTU Main Campus, Jalandhar-Kapurthala Highway, Kapurthala 144603, Punjab, India
- Campus: List of Campuses; Main Campus Main Campus, Kapurthala (Established 1997, 78.1 acres (31.6 hectares)); Satellite Campuses; Hoshiarpur Campus (Established 2013, 22.6 acres (9.1 hectares); Amritsar Campus (Established 2012, 22.5 acres (9.1 hectares)); Mohali Campus - I (Estab. 2004, 2.5 acres (1.0 hectare)); Mohali Campus - II (Established 2013, 11.7 acres (4.7 hectares))
- Colours: Blue – Red
- Website: www.ptu.ac.in

I. K. Gujral Punjab Technical University (IKGPTU), formerly Punjab Technical University (PTU), is a public state university in Kapurthala, Punjab, India established by an Act of State Legislature on 16 January 1997.

== Renaming ==
In recognition of contribution made by the former Indian Prime Minister late I. K. Gujral towards the overall development and prosperity of state of Punjab, the state government, by 'The Punjab Technical University (Amendment) Act 2014' renamed the Punjab Technical University as 'I.K. Gujral Punjab Technical University.'

== Rankings ==
University rankings

Engineering – India
- NIRF (2021): 120

In 2021 NIRF Rankings, the institute was ranked 120 among the top engineering colleges of India. In 2016 university was ranked 3rd in State, 33rd in research and 54th among top 100 Universities of India in NIRF 2016 ranking.

== Notable alumni ==
- Charanjit Singh Channi
- Hargovind Bhargava
- Sidhu Moosewala
- Deepika Singh
- Amrit Mann
- AP Dhillon
