= Sandila Assembly constituency =

Constituency in India

Coordinates: 27.07°N 80.51°E

Sandila
- Constituency No. 161 for the Uttar Pradesh Legislative Assembly

Constituency details
- Country: India
- Region: North India
- State: Uttar Pradesh
- District: Hardoi
- Total electors: 3,41,211
- Reservation: None

Member of Legislative Assembly
- 18th Uttar Pradesh Legislative Assembly
- Incumbent Alka Singh Arkvanshi
- Party: BJP
- Alliance: NDA
- Elected year: 2022

Sandila is an assembly constituency of the Uttar Pradesh Legislative Assembly covering the area of Sandila in Hardoi district of Uttar Pradesh, India. Sandila is one of five assembly constituencies in the Misrikh Lok Sabha constituency. Since 2008, this assembly constituency is numbered 161 amongst 403 constituencies. Currently this constituency is represented by Alka Singh Arkvanshi, who won in 2022 Uttar Pradesh Legislative Assembly election.

== Election results ==
=== 2027 ===
2027 Uttar Pradesh Legislative Assembly election: Sandila
Party	Candidate	Votes	%	±%
INDIA				
NDA				
BSP	Vinod Singh Tomar Alias Binnu Bhaiya			
NOTA	None of the above			
Majority				
Turnout				
gain from		Swing		

=== 2022 ===
Bharatiya Janata Party candidate Alka Singh Arkvanshi won in 2022 Uttar Pradesh Legislative Assembly election defeating Bahujan Samaj Party candidate Abdul Mannan by a margin of 37,103 votes.

2022 Uttar Pradesh Legislative Assembly election: Sandila
Party	Candidate	Votes	%	±%
BJP	Alka Singh Arkvanshi	101,730	49.76	▲4.27
BSP	Abdul Mannan	64,627	31.61	▲16.9
SBSP	Sunil Singh Arkvanshi	24,655	12.06	
Bharatiya Shakti Chetna Party	Abhinay Gupta	3,672	1.8	
INC	Mohammad Haneef	3,464	1.69	
NOTA	None of the above	1,856	0.91	▲0.13
Majority		37,103	18.15	▲7.88
Turnout		204,445	59.92	▲0.46
BJP hold		Swing		

=== 2017 ===
Bharatiya Janata Party candidate Raj Kumar Agrawal won in 2017 Uttar Pradesh Legislative Elections defeating Samajwadi Party candidate Abdul Mannan by a margin of 20,403 votes.

2017 Uttar Pradesh Legislative Assembly election: Sandila
Party	Candidate	Votes	%	±%
BJP	Raj Kumar Agrawal	90,362	45.49	
SP	Abdul Mannan	69,959	35.22	
BSP	Pawan Kumar Singh	29,223	14.71	
NOTA	None of the above	1,532	0.78	
Majority		20,403	10.27	
Turnout		198,649	59.46	
