= Yarpur, Ambedkar Nagar =

Village in Ambedkar Nagar district, Uttar Pradesh, India

Yarpur
- Village
- Location in Uttar Pradesh, India Yarpur (India)
- Coordinates: 26.609°N 82.544°E
- Country: India
- State: Uttar Pradesh
- District: Ambedkar Nagar
- Tehsil: Tanda

Population (2011)
  - Total: 67
- Time zone: UTC+05:30 (IST)

Yarpur is a village in Tanda tehsil, Ambedkar Nagar district, Uttar Pradesh, India. The population was 67 at the 2011 Indian census.
