= Hargovind Bhargava =

Indian economist and politician

MLA, 17th Legislative Assembly
- In office 2017–2022
- Constituency: Sidhauli, Sitapur district

Personal details
- Party: Samajwadi Party
- Other political affiliations: Bahujan Samaj Party
- Parent: Ramdulare
- Education: Chandra Shekhar Azad University of Agriculture and Technology (B.Sc.Ag., M.Sc.Ag, PhD); Punjab Technical University (MBA); Chhatrapati Shahu Ji Maharaj University (B.Ed.)
- Profession: Assistant professor & Politician

Hargovind Bhargava is an Indian agricultural economist, assistant professor, politician and a former MLA. He was a member of the 17th Legislative Assembly of Uttar Pradesh and the 15th Legislative Assembly of Uttar Pradesh, representing Sidhauli constituency twice.

== Education and academic career ==
He holds Bachelors of Science, Master of Science and a doctorate degree in Agriculture Science and Economics from Chandra Shekhar Azad (CSA) University of Agriculture and Technology, Kanpur. He further continued his education by completing Master of Business Administration from Punjab Technical University, Jalandhar and Bachelors of Education from Chhatrapati Shahu Ji Maharaj (CSJM) University, Kanpur.

In 2012, he was appointed an assistant professor at Department of Agricultural Economics and Statistics of Kulbhaskar Ashram PG College.

== Political career ==
Bhargava has been a second time member of the 17th Legislative Assembly of Uttar Pradesh. Between 2017-2022, he represented the Sidhauli constituency and is a member of the BSP. He was also a member of Assembly between 2007–2012.

== Political posts held ==
#	From	To	Position
01	2007	2012	Member, 15th Legislative Assembly of Uttar Pradesh
02	2017	2022	Member, 17th Legislative Assembly of Uttar Pradesh

== See also ==
- Uttar Pradesh Legislative Assembly
