= Misrikh Assembly constituency =

Constituency of the Uttar Pradesh legislative assembly in India

Misrikh
- Constituency No. 153 for the Uttar Pradesh Legislative Assembly

Constituency details
- Country: India
- Region: North India
- State: Uttar Pradesh
- District: Sitapur
- Established: 1951
- Total electors: 318,150 (2012)
- Reservation: SC

Member of Legislative Assembly
- 18th Uttar Pradesh Legislative Assembly
- Incumbent Ram Krishna Bhargava
- Party: Bharatiya Janata Party

Misrikh is one of the 403 constituencies of the Uttar Pradesh Legislative Assembly, India. It is a part of the Sitapur district and one of the five assembly constituencies in the Misrikh Lok Sabha constituency. First election in this assembly constituency was held in 1952 after the "DPACO (1951)" (delimitation order) was passed in 1951. After the "Delimitation of Parliamentary and Assembly Constituencies Order" was passed in 2008, the constituency was assigned identification number 153.

== Wards / Areas ==
Extent of Misrikh Assembly constituency is KCs Mishrikh, Machhrehata, Aurangabad & Misrikh- CumNeemsar MB of Mishrikh Tehsil.

== Members of the Legislative Assembly ==
| # | Term | Name | Party | From | To | Days | Comments | Ref |
|---|---|---|---|---|---|---|---|---|
| 01 | 01st Vidhan Sabha | Ganga Dhar Sharma | Indian National Congress | Mar-1952 | Mar-1957 | 1,849 | Constituency had two seats | |
| 01 | 01st Vidhan Sabha | Dalla Ram | Indian National Congress | Mar-1952 | Mar-1957 | 1,849 | Constituency had two seats | |
| 02 | 02nd Vidhan Sabha | Mool Chand | Independent | Apr-1957 | Mar-1962 | 1,800 | Constituency had two seats | |
| 02 | 02nd Vidhan Sabha | Awadhesh Kumar | Independent | Apr-1957 | Mar-1962 | 1,800 | Constituency had two seats | |
| 03 | 03rd Vidhan Sabha | Awadhesh Kumar | Socialist Party | Mar-1962 | Mar-1967 | 1,828 | - | |
| 04 | 04th Vidhan Sabha | R. Bahadur | Indian National Congress | Mar-1967 | Apr-1968 | 402 | - | |
| 05 | 05th Vidhan Sabha | Awadhesh Kumar | Samyukta Socialist Party | Feb-1969 | Mar-1974 | 1,832 | - | |
| 06 | 06th Vidhan Sabha | Ram Ratan Singh | Indian National Congress | Mar-1974 | Apr-1977 | 1,153 | - | |
| 07 | 07th Vidhan Sabha | Ram Ratan Singh | Indian National Congress | Jun-1977 | Feb-1980 | 969 | - | |
| 08 | 08th Vidhan Sabha | Ram Ratan Singh | Indian National Congress (I) | Jun-1980 | Mar-1985 | 1,735 | - | |
| 09 | 09th Vidhan Sabha | Ram Ratan Singh | Indian National Congress | Mar-1985 | Nov-1989 | 1,725 | - | |
| 10 | 10th Vidhan Sabha | Om Prakash Gupta | Independent | Dec-1989 | Apr-1991 | 488 | - | |
| 11 | 11th Vidhan Sabha | Ram Ratan Singh | Indian National Congress | Jun-1991 | Dec-1992 | 533 | - | |
| 12 | 12th Vidhan Sabha | Om Prakash Gupta | Samajwadi Party | Dec-1993 | Oct-1995 | 693 | - | |
| 13 | 13th Vidhan Sabha | Om Prakash Gupta | Samajwadi Party | Oct-1996 | May-2002 | 1,967 | - | |
| 14 | 14th Vidhan Sabha | Om Prakash Gupta | Samajwadi Party | Feb-2002 | May-2007 | 1,902 | - | |
| 15 | 15th Vidhan Sabha | Anoop Kumar | Samajwadi Party | May-2007 | Mar-2012 | 1,762 | - | |
| 16 | 16th Vidhan Sabha | Ram Pal Rajwanshi | Samajwadi Party | Mar-2012 | Mar-2017 | - | - | |
| 17 | 17th Vidhan Sasha | Ram Krishna Bhargava | Bharatiya Janata Party | Mar-2017 | Mar-2022 | | | |
| 18 | 18th Vidhan Sabha | Ram Krishna Bhargava | Bharatiya Janata Party | Mar-2022 | Incumbent | | | |

== Election results ==
=== 2027 ===
2027 Uttar Pradesh Legislative Assembly election: Misrikh
| Party | Candidate | Votes | % | ±% |
|---|---|---|---|---|
| INDIA | | | | |
| NDA | | | | |
| BSP | Abhilasha Verma | | | |
| NOTA | None of the above | | | |
| Majority | | | | |
| Turnout | | | | |
| gain from | | Swing | | |

=== 2022 ===
2022 Uttar Pradesh Legislative Assembly Election: Misrikh
| Party | Candidate | Votes | % | ±% |
|---|---|---|---|---|
| BJP | Ram Krishna Bhargava | 91,092 | 41.15 | +1.82 |
| SBSP | Manoj Kumar Rajvanshi | 79,627 | 35.97 | |
| BSP | Shyam Kishor | 34,654 | 15.66 | −14.26 |
| Independent | Manoj Kumar | 4,087 | 1.85 | |
| Jansatta Dal (L) | Dharmendra Dhangar | 3,764 | 1.7 | |
| NOTA | None of the above | 1,498 | 0.68 | −0.34 |
| Majority | | 11,465 | 5.18 | −4.23 |
| Turnout | | 221,341 | 61.57 | −2.11 |
| BJP hold | | Swing | | |

=== 2017 ===
2017 Uttar Pradesh Legislative Assembly Election: Misrikh
| Party | Candidate | Votes | % | ±% |
|---|---|---|---|---|
| BJP | Ram Krishna Bhargava | 86,403 | 39.33 | |
| BSP | Manish Kumar Rawat | 65,731 | 29.92 | |
| SP | Ram Pal Rajwanshi | 61,231 | 27.87 | |
| NOTA | None of the above | 2,222 | 1.02 | |
| Majority | | 20,672 | 9.41 | |
| Turnout | | 219,695 | 63.68 | |

=== 2012 ===
2012 General Elections: Misrikh
| Party | Candidate | Votes | % | ±% |
|---|---|---|---|---|
| SP | Ram Pal Rajwanshi | 61,346 | 32.76 | − |
| BSP | Manish Kumar Rawat | 59,824 | 31.94 | − |
| INC | Ram Krishna | 34,040 | 18.18 | − |
| | Remainder 12 candidates | 32,073 | 17.11 | − |
| Majority | | 1,522 | 0.81 | − |
| Turnout | | 187,283 | 58.87 | − |
| SP hold | | Swing | | |

== See also ==
- Misrikh Lok Sabha constituency
- Sitapur district
- Sixteenth Legislative Assembly of Uttar Pradesh
- Uttar Pradesh Legislative Assembly
- Vidhan Bhawan
