= Sidhauli Assembly constituency =

Constituency of the Uttar Pradesh legislative assembly in India

Sidhauli
- Constituency No. 152 for the Uttar Pradesh Legislative Assembly

Constituency details
- Country: India
- Region: North India
- State: Uttar Pradesh
- District: Sitapur
- Established: 1951
- Total electors: 3,18,785 (2014)
- Reservation: SC

Member of Legislative Assembly
- 18th Uttar Pradesh Legislative Assembly
- Incumbent Manish Rawat
- Party: Bharatiya Janata Party

Sidhauli is one of the 403 constituencies of the Uttar Pradesh Legislative Assembly, India. It is a part of the Sitapur district and one of the five assembly constituencies in the Mohanlalganj Lok Sabha constituency. The first election in this assembly constituency was held in 1952 after the "DPACO (1951)" (delimitation order) was passed in 1951. After the "Delimitation of Parliamentary and Assembly Constituencies Order" was passed in 2008, the constituency was assigned identification number 152.

== Wards / Areas ==
Extent of Sidhauli Assembly constituency is KCs Bhandiya, Manwa, Gondlamau, Sidhauli NP, PCs Sidhauli, Husainganj, Sujaulia, Aladadpur, Bamhera, Hamirpur, Bahrimau, Basaideeh, Jairampur, Unchakhera Kala, Manpara & Kasmanda of Peer Nagar KC of Sidhauli Tehsil.

== Members of the Legislative Assembly ==
#	Term	Name	Party	From	To	Days	Comments	Ref
01	01st Vidhan Sabha	Tara Chand Maheshwari	Indian National Congress	Mar-1952	Mar-1957	1,849	Constituency was called Sidhauli West and had 3 elected members during the term.	
01	01st Vidhan Sabha	Baiju Ram	Indian National Congress	Mar-1952	Mar-1957	1,849	Constituency was called Sidhauli West and had 3 elected members during the term.	
01	01st Vidhan Sabha	Kanhaiya Lal	Praja Socialist Party	Mar-1952	Mar-1957	1,849	Constituency was called Sidhauli West and had 3 elected members during the term.	
02	02nd Vidhan Sabha	Tara Chand Maheshwari	Indian National Congress	Apr-1957	Mar-1962	1,800	Constituency was called Sidhauli West and had 2 elected members during the term.	
02	02nd Vidhan Sabha	Baiju Ram	Indian National Congress	Apr-1957	Mar-1962	1,800	Constituency was called Sidhauli West and had 2 elected members during the term.	
03	03rd Vidhan Sabha	-	-	Mar-1962	Mar-1967	1,828	Constituency not in existence	
04	04th Vidhan Sabha	M. Din	Bharatiya Jana Sangh	Mar-1967	Apr-1968	402	-	
05	05th Vidhan Sabha	Shyam Lal Rawat	Indian National Congress	Feb-1969	Mar-1974	1,832	-	
06	06th Vidhan Sabha	Shyam Lal Rawat	Indian National Congress	Mar-1974	Apr-1977	1,153	-	
07	07th Vidhan Sabha	Ganesh Lal Chaudhari Vakil	Janata Party	Jun-1977	Feb-1980	969	-	
08	08th Vidhan Sabha	Ram Lal	Bharatiya Janata Party	Jun-1980	Mar-1985	1,735	-	
09	09th Vidhan Sabha	Ram Lal	Indian National Congress	Mar-1985	Nov-1989	1,725	-	
10	10th Vidhan Sabha	Shyam Lal Rawat	Janata Dal	Dec-1989	Apr-1991	488	-	
11	11th Vidhan Sabha	Shyam Lal Rawat	Janata Party	Jun-1991	Dec-1992	533	-	
12	12th Vidhan Sabha	Shyam Lal Rawat	Samajwadi Party	Dec-1993	Oct-1995	693	-	
13	13th Vidhan Sabha	Shyam Lal Rawat	Samajwadi Party	Oct-1996	May-2002	1,967	-	
14	14th Vidhan Sabha	Shyam Lal Rawat	Samajwadi Party	Feb-2002	May-2007	1,902	-	
15	15th Vidhan Sabha	Hargovind Bhargava	Bahujan Samaj Party	May-2007	Mar-2012	1,762	-	
16	16th Vidhan Sabha	Manish Rawat	Samajwadi Party	Mar-2012	Mar-2017	-	-	
17	17th Vidhan Sabha	Hargovind Bhargava	Bahujan Samaj Party	Mar-2017	Mar-2022	-	-	
18	18th Vidhan Sabha	Manish Rawat	Bharatiya Janata Party	Mar-2022	Incumbent			

== Election results ==
=== 2027 ===
2027 Uttar Pradesh Legislative Assembly election: Sidhauli
Party	Candidate	Votes	%	±%
INDIA				
NDA				
BSP				
NOTA	None of the above			
Majority				
Turnout				
gain from		Swing		

=== 2022 ===
2022 Uttar Pradesh Legislative Assembly election: Sidhauli
Party	Candidate	Votes	%	±%
BJP	Manish Rawat	106,222	43.58	▲13.95
SP	Hargovind Bhargava	96,506	39.6	▲6.95
BSP	Pushpendra Kumar Pasi	31,530	12.94	▼20.79
INC	Kamla Rawat	2,360	0.97	
NOTA	None of the above	1,556	0.64	▼0.3
Majority		9,716	3.98	▲2.9
Turnout		243,719	68.62	▼2.08
BJP gain from BSP		Swing		

=== 2017 ===
2017 Uttar Pradesh Legislative Assembly Election: Sidhauli
Party	Candidate	Votes	%	±%
BSP	Hargovind Bhargava	78,506	33.73	
SP	Manish Rawat	75,996	32.65	
BJP	Ram Bakash Rawat	68,956	29.63	
RKSP	Indrapal	2,442	1.05	
NOTA	None of the above	2,169	0.94	
Majority		2,510	1.08	
Turnout		232,737	70.7	

=== 2012 ===
16th Vidhan Sabha: 2012 General Elections

2012 General Elections: Sidhauli
Party	Candidate	Votes	%	±%
SP	Manish Rawat	73,714	36.65	−
BSP	Hargovind Bhargava	67,083	33.35	−
INC	Shyam Lal Rawat	30,780	15.3	−
	Remainder 9 candidates	29,568	14.7	−
Majority		6,631	3.3	−
Turnout		201,145	66.63	−
SP gain from BSP		Swing		

== See also ==
- Mohanlalganj Lok Sabha constituency
- Sitapur district
- Sixteenth Legislative Assembly of Uttar Pradesh
- Uttar Pradesh Legislative Assembly
- Vidhan Bhawan
