= Ram Lal Rahi =

Indian politician (1934–2020)

Ram Lal Rahi (1 January 1934 – 10 December 2020) was a leader of Indian National Congress and a former Minister in the Union Government 1991-1996. He was the Minister of State for Home Affairs during the Narasimha Rao government and was a four- time MP from Mishrikh and a two time MLA from Hargaon in Sitapur district.

== Personal life ==
Born on 1 January 1934 into Pasi caste to Shri Dhodey at Vill. Dhakhara in Sitapur (Uttar Pradesh). He completed his high school from Raja Raghubar Dayal Inter College, Sitapur (Uttar Pradesh).

== Politics ==
He became Minister of State for Home Affairs during the Narasimha Rao government and was a four-time MP from Mishrikh and a two time MLA from Hargaon in Sitapur district. He left his party and unofficially joined Bharatiya Janata Party before Uttar Pradesh Assembly Election 2017 and later re-joined Congress in 2019.

His son Suresh Rahi is an MLA of Hargaon from BJP.

== Death ==
Ramlal Rahi was admitted to the district hospital in Sitapur after complaining of chest pain and breathing difficulty. He died around 5:30 pm on 10 December 2020, of a heart attack and also testing positive for COVID-19 during the COVID-19 pandemic in India. He was 86 years old.
