= Ram Krishna Bhargava =

Member of the Uttar Pradesh Legislative Assembly

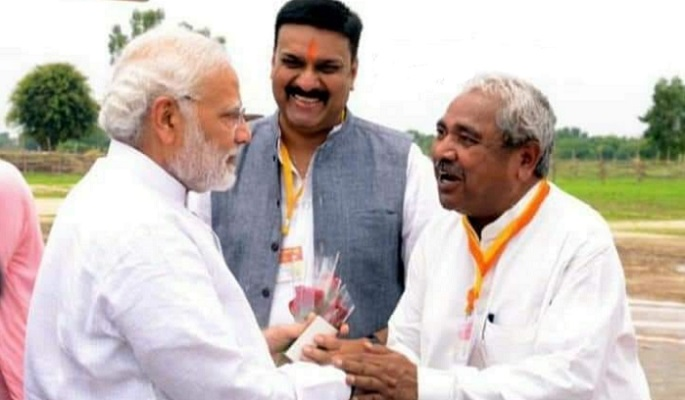

Member of Uttar Pradesh Legislative Assembly
- Incumbent
- Assumed office March 2017
- Preceded by: Ram Pal Rajwanshi
- Constituency: Misrikh LokSabha

Personal details
- Born: 1 July 1952 (age 74) Sitapur, Uttar Pradesh
- Party: Bharatiya Janata Party
- Spouse: Mithlesh Kumari
- Children: 2
- Parent: Raghunandan Prasad (father)
- Education: Intermediate
- Alma mater: RRD Inter College
- Occupation: Farmer
- Profession: Politician

Shri Ramkrishna Bhargava (born 1 July 1952) is an Indian politician from the Bharatiya Janata Party (BJP), representing the 153-Misrikh constituency in Sitapur district, Uttar Pradesh. He has been elected multiple times as a Member of the Legislative Assembly (MLA) and has served in various capacities throughout his political career.

== Early life and education ==
Ramkrishna Bhargava was born on 1 July 1952 in Madhwapur village of Sitapur, Uttar Pradesh, to Shri Raghunandan Prasad. He belongs to the Pasi community, which is recognized as a Scheduled Caste. He completed his intermediate education before embarking on a career in agriculture and business.

== Personal life ==
Ramkrishna Bhargava married Smt. Mithlesh Kumari on 22 May 1974. His wife was born on 13 August 1961. The couple has two sons. Bhargava's primary residence is in Madhwapur village, under the Machhrehta block of Sitapur district, while he maintains a temporary address at 110, New Block, Darulshafa, Lucknow.

== Political career ==
Ram Krishna Bhargava has been actively involved in politics from 1984.

Political career	Details
1984-1989	Elected to the 9th Legislative Assembly of Uttar Pradesh for the first time.
1991-1993	Re-elected to the 11th Legislative Assembly for the second term.
2002-2007	Elected for the third time to the 14th Legislative Assembly.
2003-2005	Served as Minister of State in the Mulayam Singh Yadav Cabinet.
March 2017	Elected to the 17th Legislative Assembly for the fourth term.
2017-2019	Member of the Joint Committee on Scheduled Castes, Scheduled Tribes, and Denotified Castes.
2019-2022	Member of the Public Accounts Committee.
March 2022	Elected to the 18th Legislative Assembly for the fifth time.

== Other contributions ==
Ram Krishna Bhargava has been actively participating in other positions.

Other contributions	Details
1980–present	President of UP Desco, Lucknow.
2007–present	Vice President of Sant Ram Savitri Devi Inter College, Gamabag Machhrehatta, Sitapur.

== Allegations against BJP MLA's son ==
"In May 2018, a significant controversy emerged involving the son of a Bharatiya Janata Party (BJP) MLA from Uttar Pradesh. The son of the MLA was accused of murdering a Panchayat Samiti member, which sparked widespread outrage and media attention. According to reports, the incident occurred when the Panchayat Samiti member was fatally shot following a dispute. The case led to intense scrutiny and calls for action from opposition leaders, who demanded justice and accountability. Law enforcement agencies launched an investigation, and the case continues to be a matter of legal proceedings and public interest."

(Source: ABP Live)

== See also ==
- 18th Uttar Pradesh Assembly
- Misrikh Assembly constituency
- Uttar Pradesh Legislative Assembly
