= Manish Rawat =

Indian politician

Manish Rawat मनीष रावत

Member of Legislative Assembly Uttar Pradesh
- Incumbent
- Assumed office Mar 2022
- Preceded by: Dr. Hargovind Bhargava
- Constituency: Sidhauli

Member of Legislative Assembly Uttar Pradesh
- In office March 2012 – March 2017
- Constituency: Sidhauli

Personal details
- Born: 12 January 1984 (age 42) Hardoi district
- Party: Bharatiya Janata Party
- Other political affiliations: Samajwadi Party
- Parent: Babu Ram (father)
- Education: University of Lucknow & Dr. Ram Manohar Lohia Avadh University
- Profession: Politician & businessperson

Manish Rawat (Hindi: मनीष रावत) is an Indian politician and a member of the 18th Uttar Pradesh Assembly in India. He represents the Sidhauli constituency of Uttar Pradesh and is a member of the Bharatiya Janata Party political party.

== Early life and education ==
Manish Rawat was born in Hardoi district. He attended the University of Lucknow and Dr. Ram Manohar Lohia Avadh University and attained Master of Arts and Bachelor of Education degrees. Rawat belongs to the scheduled caste category.

== Political career ==
Manish Rawat has been a MLA for one term. He represented the Sidhauli constituency and is a member of the Bhartiya Janta Party political party.

== Posts held ==
#	From	To	Position	Comments
01	2012	Incumbent	Member, 16th Legislative Assembly	

== See also ==
- Sidhauli (Assembly constituency)
- Sixteenth Legislative Assembly of Uttar Pradesh
- Uttar Pradesh Legislative Assembly
