= Ashish Kumar Singh =

Indian politician

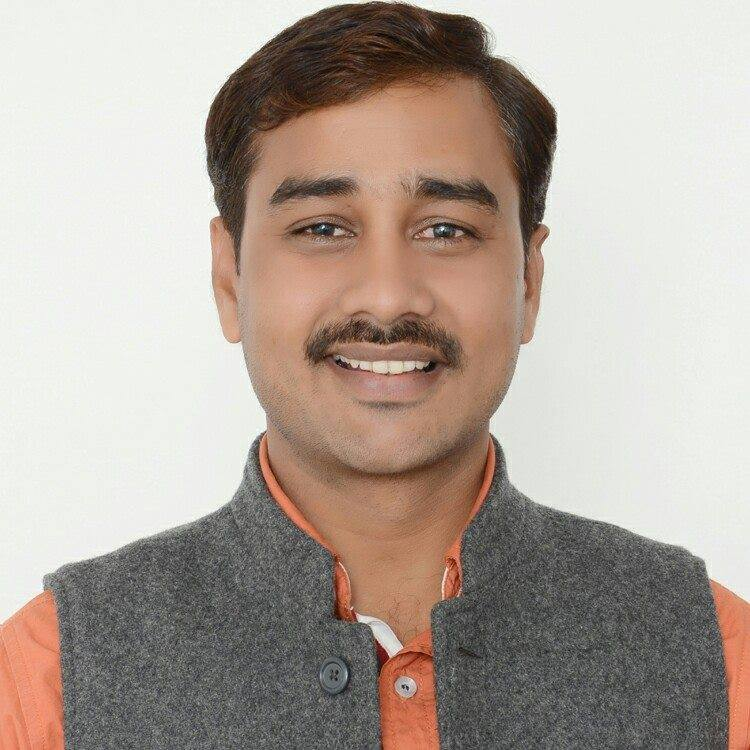

Member of the Uttar Pradesh Legislative Assembly
- Incumbent
- Assumed office 2017
- Preceded by: Brijesh Kumar
- Constituency: Bilgram-Mallanwan, Hardoi, Uttar Pradesh
- Prime Minister: Narendra Modi

Personal details
- Born: Mallawan, Hardoi, Uttar Pradesh
- Party: Bharatiya Janata Party
- Education: University of Lucknow
- Occupation: Politician
- Profession: Member of bar council of india

Ashish Kumar Singh Ashu is an Indian politician. He belongs to the Bharatiya Janata Party and is a member of the Uttar Pradesh Legislative Assembly representing the Bilgram-Mallanwan Vidhan Sabha constituency of Uttar Pradesh. He was born in Village Devmanpur Mallawan in a middle-class family his father was Principal in an inter college and was active into RSS.
