= Ashok Kumar Rawat =

Indian politician

Member of Parliament, Lok Sabha
- In office 2004-2014, 2019- Present (3rd term)
- Constituency: Misrikh

Personal details
- Born: 26 November 1975 (age 50) Hardoi, Uttar Pradesh
- Party: BJP
- Occupation: Politician
- As of 23 June, 2019

Ashok Kumar Rawat (born 26 November 1975) is an Indian politician from Sitapur District of Uttar Pradesh. He currently serves as a third term Member of Parliament(Lok Sabha) from Misrikh parliamentary seat of a Uttar Pradesh. In the recent 2019 Lok Sabha Elections, he won on a BJP ticket defeating his nearest BSP rival by a margin of just over 1 lakh votes. Earlier, he has contested and served two terms in the lower house as a member of the Bahujan Samaj Party. In 2019, he managed to retain his seat which he lost in 2014. Mr. Rawat with his exemplary performance was ranked 3rd in the number of questions asked in the 15th Lok Sabha as per PRS India Report.

== Political career ==
Mr. Rawat entered parliament in 2004 winning the Lok Sabha election on a BSP ticket from Misrikh Lok Sabha constituency of Uttar Pradesh. During this period, he served as a member of various committees, such as the committee on Public Accounts, committee on the welfare of Scheduled Caste and Scheduled Tribes, committee on Chemicals and Fertilizers(2007-09). He was reelected as a Member of the 15th Lok Sabha and served as a Member of the committee on welfare of Scheduled Caste and Scheduled Tribes and a Member of the committee on Chemicals and Fertilizers.

He contested the Lok Sabha elections of 2019 on a BJP ticket and managed to win handsomely by a margin of over a lakh votes as is all set to serve his constituents for another five years.

In 2024 Lok Sabha Election Rawat won with 37,810 Votes. He defeated Sangita Rajwanshi from Samajwadi Party.
