= Raja of Mahmudabad =

Raja of Mahmudabad is the title used by taluqdars of Mahmudabad Estate. The term may refer to following individuals:

- Raja Sarfaraz Ali Khan, first use, previous taluqdars used title Nawab
- Raja Musahib Ali Khan (d. 1810)
- Raja Mohammad Nawab Ali Khan (d. 1858)
- Raja Sir Mohammad Amir Hasan Khan (1849–1902)
- Raja Sir Mohammad Ali Mohammad Khan (1879–1932)
- Raja Sir Mohammad Amir Ahmad Khan (1914–1973), taluqadari abolished in 1947
- Raja Mohammad Amir Mohammad Khan (current informal user)
