= University of Lucknow =

Public university in Uttar Pradesh, India

- Seal
- Former name: Canning College
- Motto: वंशस्याग्रे ध्वजो यथा
- Motto in English: Light and Learning
- Type: Public State University
- Established: 25 November 1920; 105 years ago
- Founders: Mohammad Ali Mohammad Khan, Maharaja Sir Ejaz Rasul Khan
- Accreditation: NAAC
- Academic affiliations: UGC; AIU; BCI; NCTE; AICTE; PCI
- Budget: ₹137 crore (US$15 million)
- Chancellor: Governor of Uttar Pradesh
- Vice-Chancellor: Jai Prakash Saini
- Students: 20,472
- Undergraduates: 10,776
- Postgraduates: 6,280
- Location: Lucknow, Uttar Pradesh, India; 26.8467°N 80.9462°E
- Campus: 219.01 acres (88.63 ha); Urban
- Language: Hindi; English; Urdu; Awadhi
- Colors: Red Gold Blue
- Website: www.lkouniv.ac.in

The University of Lucknow (LU; officially UoL) is a public research university in Lucknow, Uttar Pradesh, India. Founded in 1864 in Lucknow as the Canning College, it is one of India’s 14th oldest universities established during British India and the 4th oldest and the first state university in Uttar Pradesh.

The University's principal campus is located in Badshah Bagh on University Road, a historic royal garden originally developed by Nawab Naseer-ud-Din Haider for his wife Qudsia Mahal. An additional campus is situated in Jankipuram and a third campus is under development in Sitapur district focusing on vocational and skill-based education.

The University of Lucknow is the largest state university in Uttar Pradesh and the only public university in the state which offers both on-campus and online degree programmes. It is a teaching, residential, and affiliating university that comprises up of 13 faculties, 51 departments and 16 institutional centres with 556 affiliated colleges across Lucknow and the surrounding districts. Since 2020, its affiliating jurisdiction has also included the districts of Raebareli, Hardoi, Sitapur and Lakhimpur Kheri.

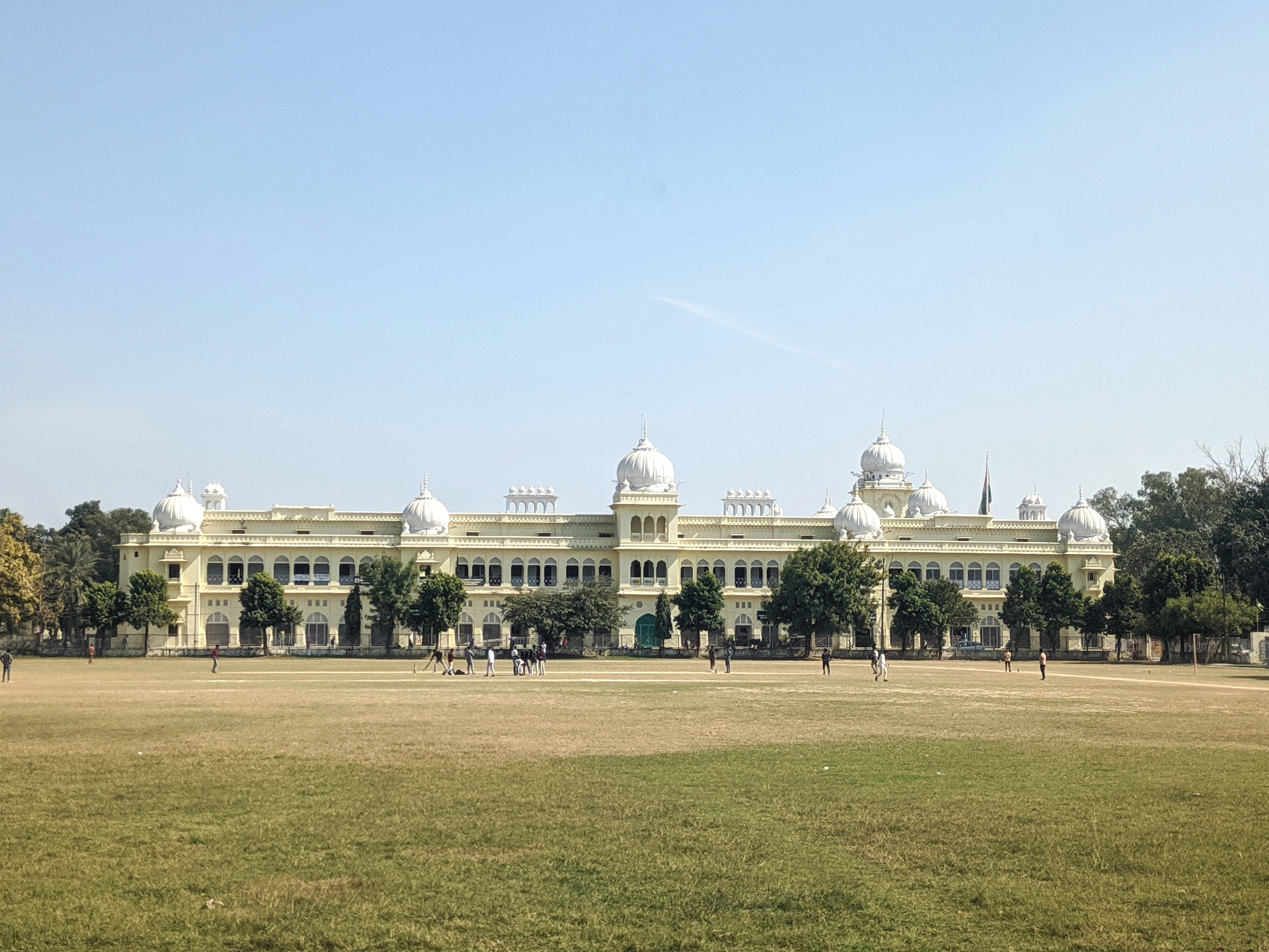
University quadrangle building

The University of Lucknow is the only state university in Uttar Pradesh to be granted the Category-I autonomy by the University Grants Commission (UGC) for excellence in teaching and research. It is also the first public university in the State to receive an A++ accreditation from the National Assessment and Accreditation Council (NAAC).

== History ==
The British, during the colonial period, transformed the Indian educational system, transitioning Indian education from the traditional Gurukul system to schools, colleges, and universities. Educational institutions established during the colonial period are still operational today, and Lucknow University is one of them.

In the summer of 1862, the first Viceroy of British India Charles John Canning died in London. For his loyalty during the Indian Rebellion of 1857, commonly referred to as the Mutiny, he was rewarded with a taluk (subdivision of a district). In his posthumous memory, a group of his loyal talukdars in Awadh decided to donate eight annas (half a rupee) from their annual income to run the school and the scheme also received government support. Just two years later on 1 May 1864, Canning High School was established with 200 students. It initially operated from two rooms of a mansion in Khayaliganj, Aminabad, before shifting to the Aminuddaulah Palace in Aminabad. The palace, which now houses the Central Hotel near Jagat Cinema and Amin-ud-daula Park, served as the school's premises, where it provided education up to the high school level.

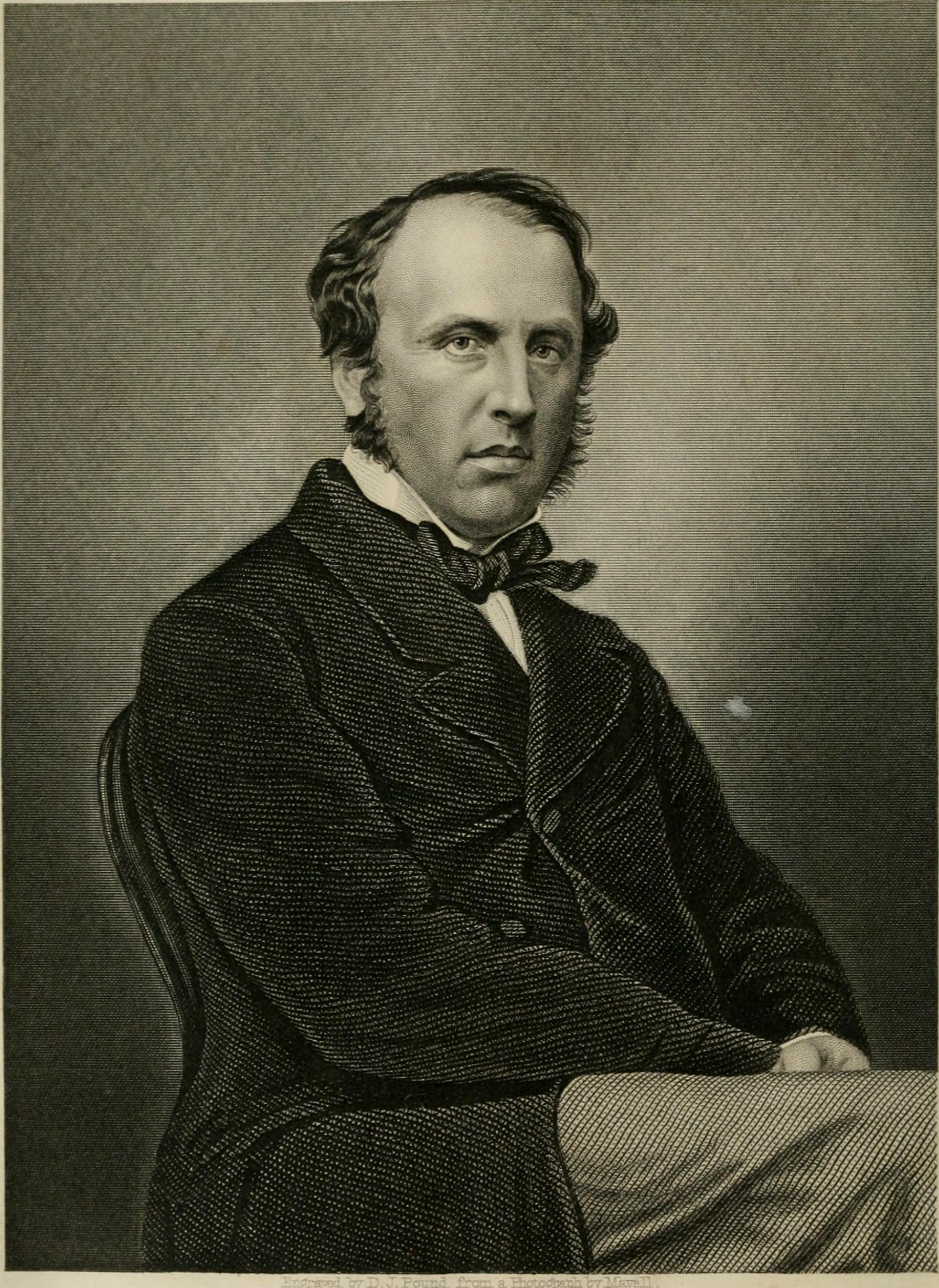
Charles John Canning, the first Viceroy of British India, after whom Canning College was named posthumously.

The Canning High School was upgraded to the status of a full-fledged college in 1866, and it was renamed as the Canning College. In its early years, the college had no building of its own and was moved between several locations. In 1866, it moved from the Aminuddaulah Palace to the Lal Baradari in Kaiserbagh (now the site of the Uttar Pradesh State Lalit Kala Academy) where it remained for two years during which its first batch of intermediate students graduated. Owing to an increase in student enrolment, the college was subsequently shifted to its own building at Pari Khana in Kaisar Bagh, the site now occupied by the Rai Umanath Bali Auditorium and Bhatkhande Sanskriti Vishwavidyalaya (formerly the Marris College of Music).

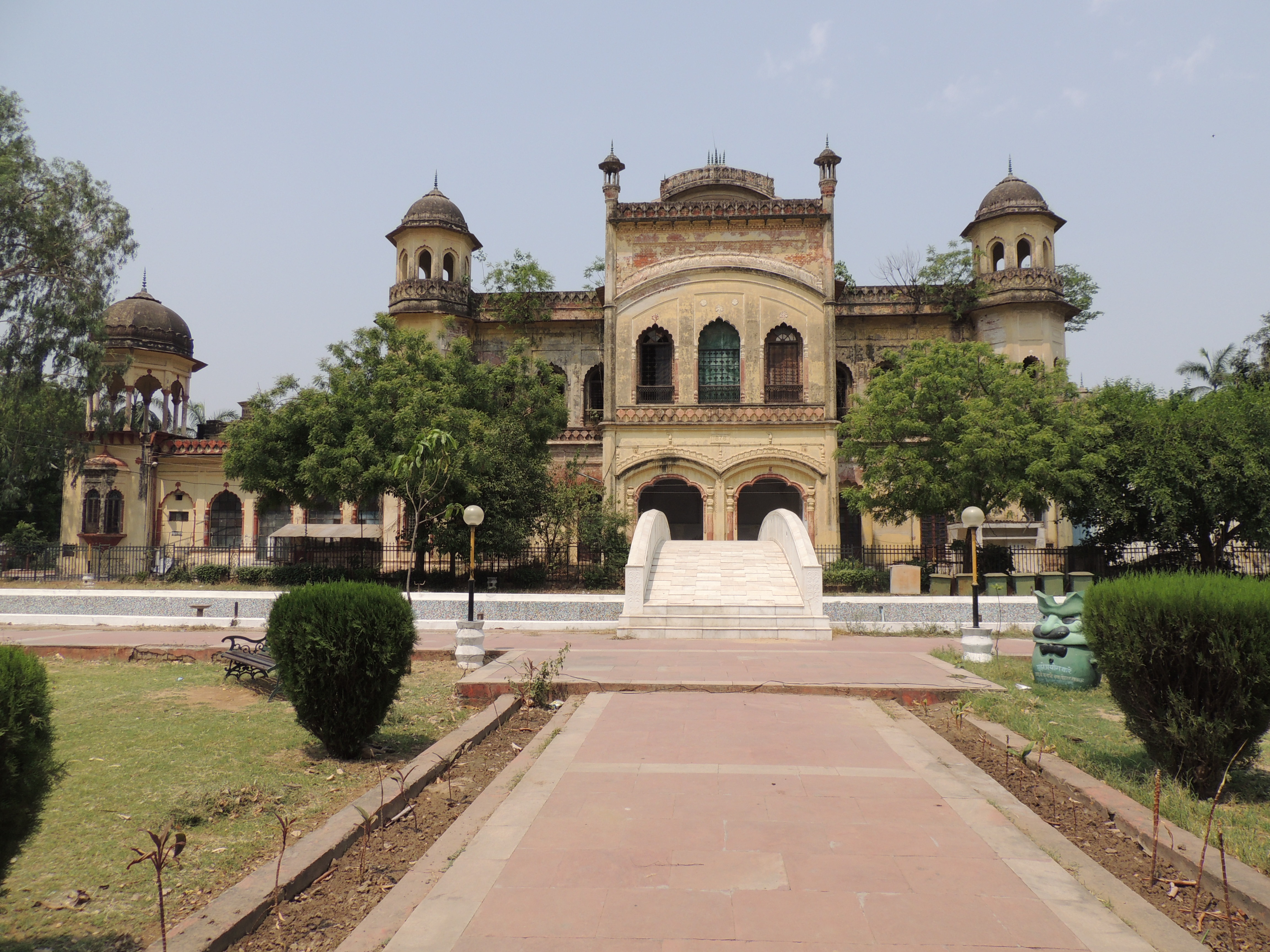
Pari Khana at Kaiserbagh, the former site of Canning College, where Bhatkhande Sanskriti Vishwavidyalaya (formerly Marris College of Music) is now located.

Owing to an increase in student enrolment, the management of the Canning College sought a larger site for the institution. The provincial government agreed to purchase the college's building in Kaiserbagh for ₹2,10,000 to accommodate the Provincial Museum (now the State Museum, Lucknow). Consequently, the college planned its relocation to Badshah Bagh which would become its permanent campus.

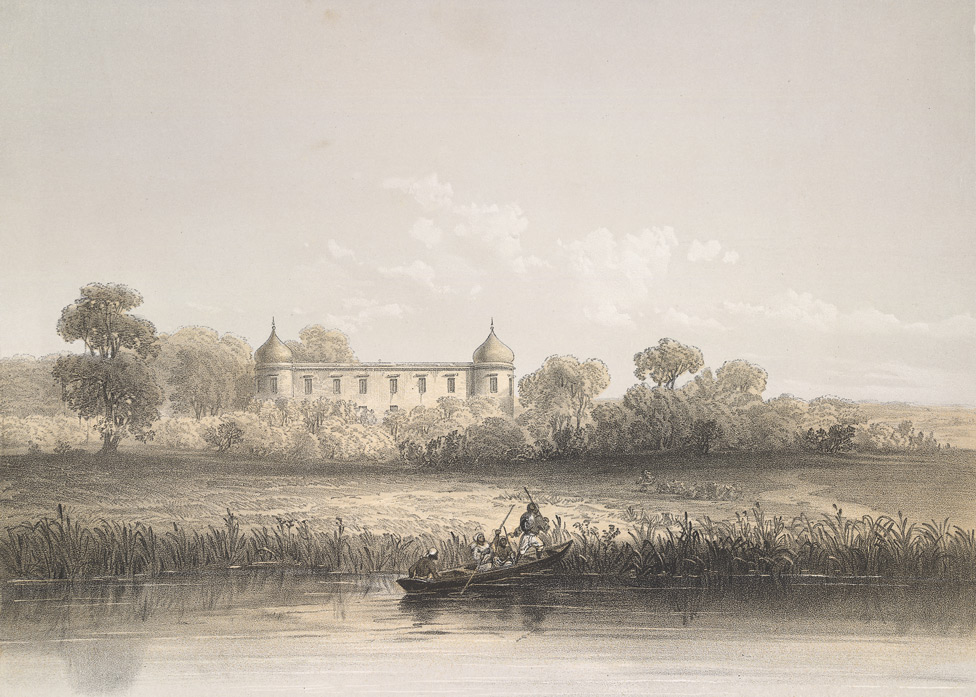
Badshah Bagh ("The King's Garden"), a historic royal garden established by Nawab Nasiruddin Haidar, now forms the main campus of the University of Lucknow.

The foundation stone of the new college building at Badshah Bagh was laid by Sir John Lawrence, the Viceroy of India, on 13 November 1867. Designed in the Indo-Saracenic style, the building featured high ceilings and wooden staircases. Construction took about eleven years, and the new campus was formally inaugurated on 15 November 1878 by Sir George Couper, Lieutenant-Governor of the North-Western Provinces and Chief Commissioner of Oudh. Following the completion of the building, Canning College shifted from Kaiserbagh to Badshah Bagh, where the University of Lucknow's main campus is located today.

A photograph depicting a class at Canning College, Lucknow, taken in 1871 from the Archaeological Survey of India Collections: India Office Series (Volume 46).

The Badshah Bagh estate originally formed part of the estates associated with the Maharaja of Kapurthala. In 1905, the estate was transferred to the management of Canning College, further consolidating the institution's presence on the site.

Before the establishment of the University of Lucknow in 1920, higher education institutions in Lucknow were affiliated with existing universities. Canning College was affiliated with the University of Calcutta from 1867 until 1887. In 1888, it came under the jurisdiction of the University of Allahabad, with which it remained affiliated until the establishment of the University of Lucknow in 1920.

In 1905, the Government handed over to Canning College the extensive walled garden of about 90 acres located north of the river Gomti, known as Badshah Bagh. This garden was originally a garden house of the glorious Nasir-ud-din Haider, Padshah-e-Awadh, the second King of Awadh (1827-1837). After the pacification of Awadh, it became the Lucknow residence of the Maharaja of Kapurthala, Randhir Singh of Kapurthala who had purchased Badshah Bagh from the British government at an auction for a nominal price of Rs. 35,000 after the Mutiny (freedom struggle). The Maharaja later leased 90 acres of the garden land to Canning College for just ₹3 as annual rent. Some remains in the garden, such as the old royal building Lal Baradari, the tall and beautiful gates, and the canal, remind us of its historicity.

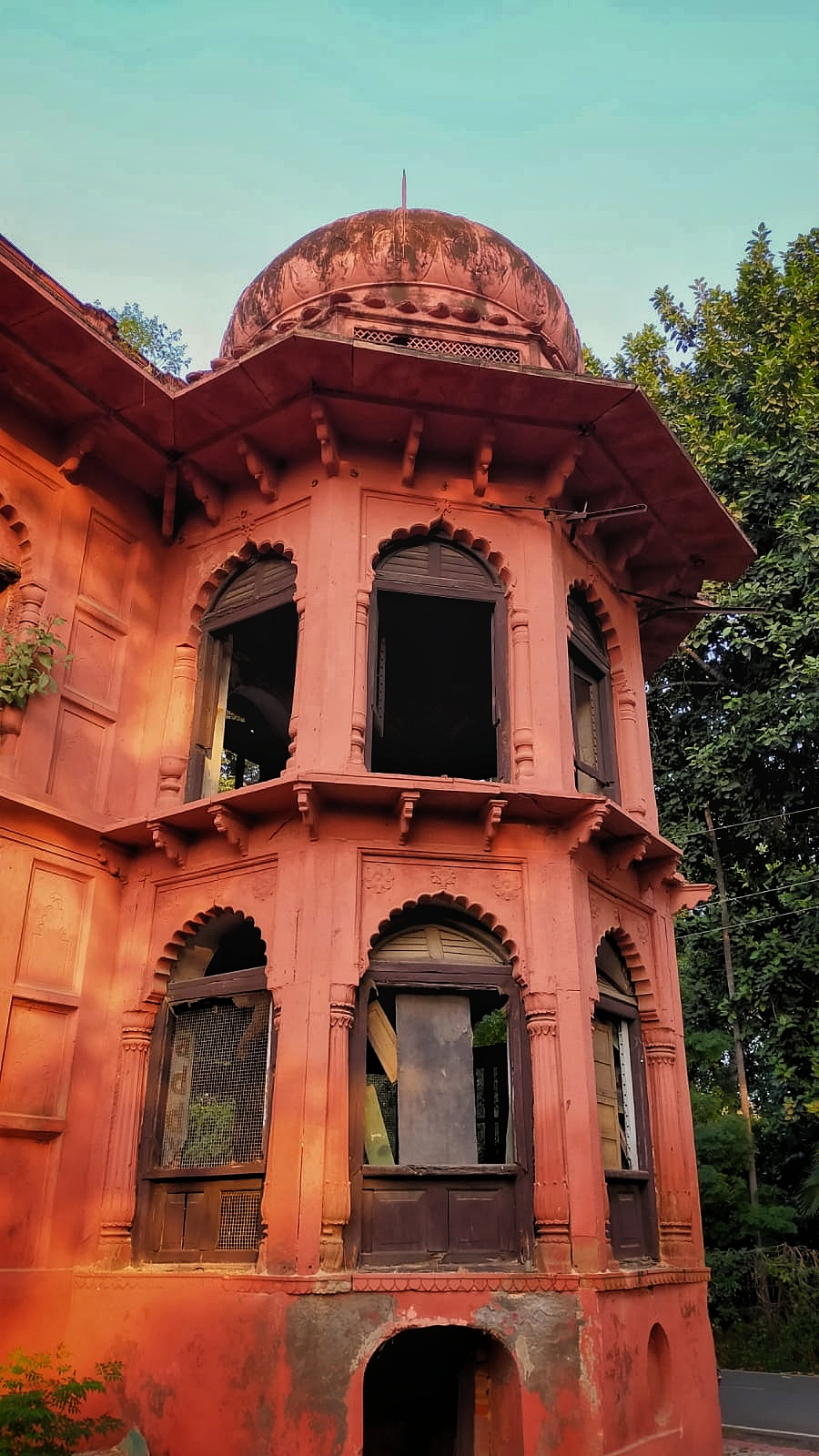
The Lal Baradari is a historic architectural gem in Lucknow University, showcasing Indo-Islamic style.

The implementation of the new building scheme was made possible due to a special grant from the Government, proceeds from the sale of the old building at Kaiserbagh, and the munificence of Maharaja Sir Bhagwati Singh of Balrampur. The construction plans were entrusted to the well-known architect Sir Swinton Jacob, who prepared an impressive design in the Indo-Saracenic style.

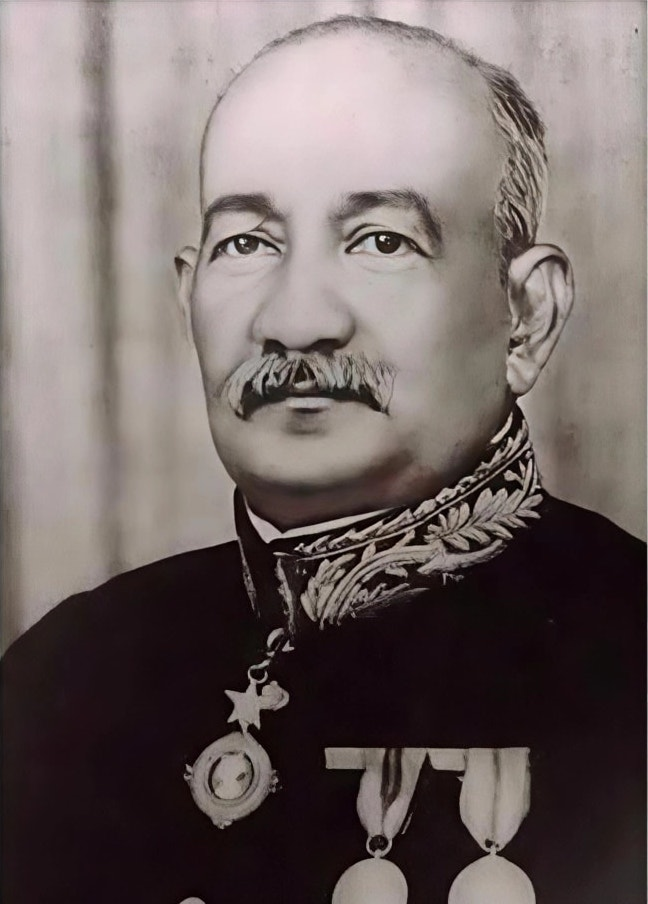
Sir Mohammad Ali Mohammad Khan, Raja of Mahmudabad, who played a leading role in the establishment of the University of Lucknow.

The idea of starting a University at Lucknow was first put forward by Raja Sir Mohammad Ali Mohammad Khan, Khan Bahadur, K.C.I.E. of Mahmudabad, who contributed an article to the columns of "The Pioneer", urging the foundation of a University at Lucknow. A little later Sir Harcourt Butler, K.C.S.I., K.C.I.E, was appointed Lieutenant-Governor of the United Provinces, and Maharaja Sir Mohammad Ejaz Rasul Khan, K.C.I.E. of Jahangirabad Raj, United Provinces

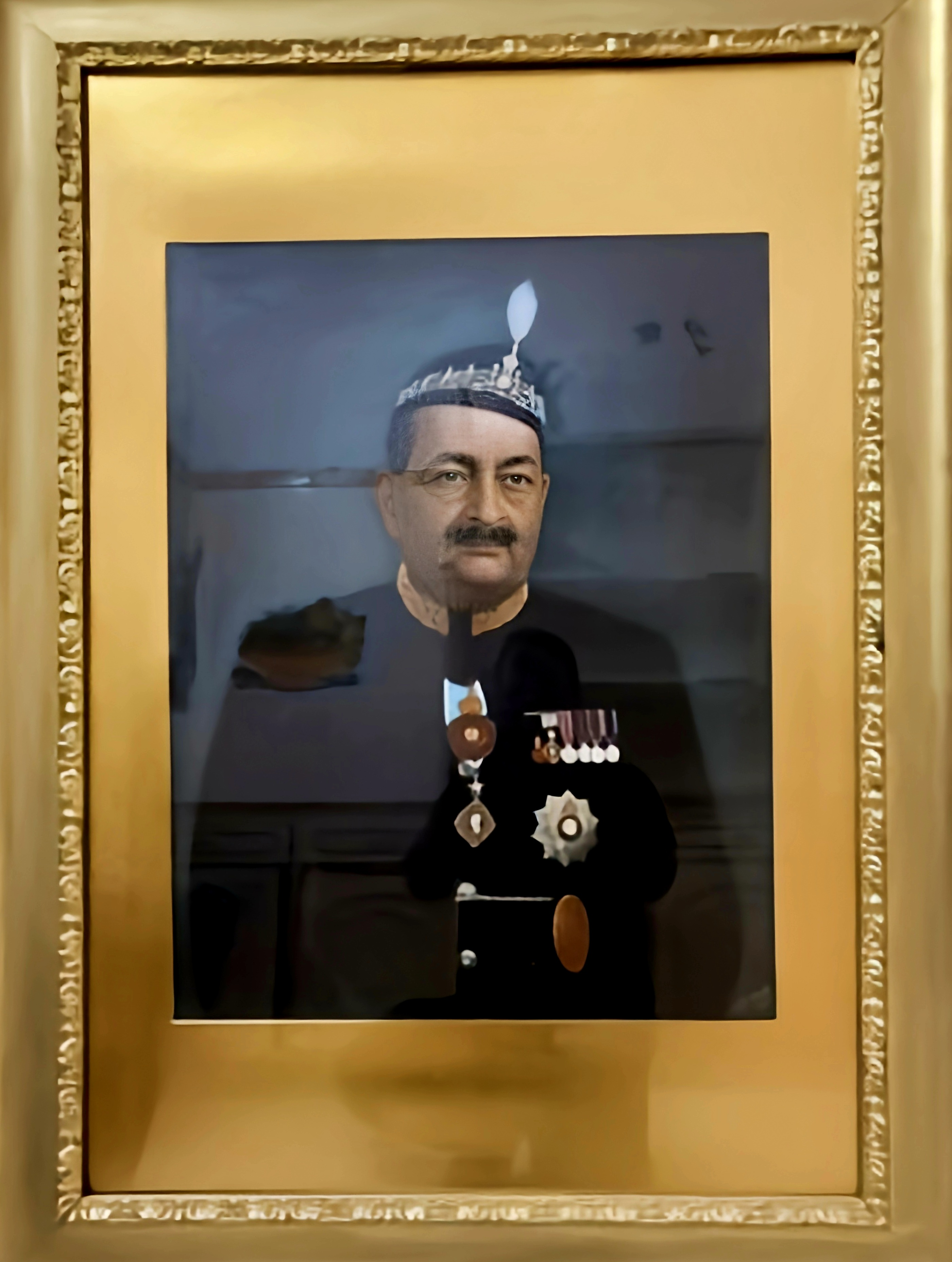
Maharaja Sir Ejaz Rasul Khan K.C.I.E., Kt., C.S.I., M.L.A., the Taluqdar of Jahangirabad Raj.

The first step to bring the University into being was taken when a General Committee of educationists and persons interested in university education appointed for the purpose, met in conference at Government House, Lucknow, on 10 November 1919.

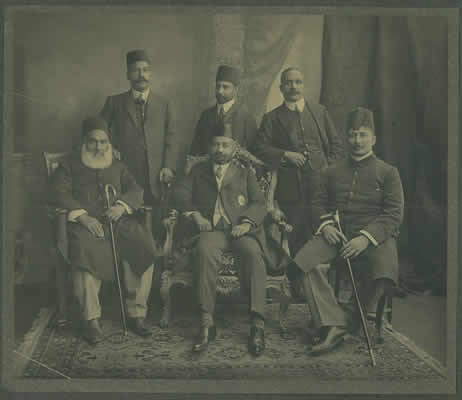
"Raja Mahmudabad (seated, center) with leaders of the Aligarh Movement."

At this meeting Sir Harcourt Butler, who was in the chair, outlined the proposed scheme for the new university. A discussion followed, and it was resolved that Lucknow University should be a Unitary, Teaching, and Residential University of the kind recommended by the Calcutta University Mission, 1919, and should consist of Faculties of Arts, including Oriental Studies, Science, Medicine, Law, etc. A number of other resolutions was also passed and six sub-committees were formed, five of them to consider questions connected with the University and one to consider the arrangements for providing Intermediate Education. These sub-committees met during the months of November and December 1919, and January 1920; and the reports of their meetings were laid before a second Conference of the General Committee at Lucknow on 26 January 1920; their proceedings were considered and discussed, and the reports of five of the sub-committees were, subject to certain amendments, confirmed. The question of incorporation of the Medical College in the University, however, was for the time being left open for expression of opinion. At the close of the Conference donations of one lakh each from the Raja of Mahmudabad and Maharaja Sir Ejaz Rasul Khan of Jahangirabad Raj were announced.

The resolutions of the first Conference together with the recommendations of the sub-committees as confirmed at the second Conference were laid before a meeting of the Allahabad University on 12 March 1920, and it was decided to appoint a sub-committee to consider them and report to the Senate. The report of the sub-committee was considered at an extraordinary meeting of the Senate on 7 August 1920, at which the Chancellor presided, and the scheme was generally approved. In the meantime the difficulty of incorporating the Medical College in the University had been removed. During the month of April 1920, Mr. C.F. de la Fosse, the then Director of Public Instruction, United Provinces, drew up a Draft Bill for the establishment of the Lucknow University which was introduced in the Legislative Council on 12 August 1920. It was then referred to a Select Committee which suggested a number of amendments, the most important being the liberalising of the constitution of the various University bodies and the inclusion of a Faculty of Commerce; this Bill, in an amended form, was passed by the Council on 8 October 1920. The Lucknow University Act, No. V of 1920, received the assent of the Lieutenant-Governor on 1 November 1920 and the Governor-General on 25 November 1920, establishing the University of Lucknow. Following this, the Canning College was merged into the University, integrating its resources and legacy into the broader educational framework.

GN Chakravarti, Pro-Vice-Chancellor of Banaras Hindu University, was appointed the first Vice-Chancellor of Lucknow University on 16 December 1920. The first academic session began in July 1921, first examinations were held in April 1922 and the first convocation was held in October 1922.

"The Temple of learning, the foundation of which we have laid, should draw teachers from all parts of the world inspired by the sacred mission of bringing wisdom where there is ignorance, light where there is darkness, and peace where there is strife. This was the old ideal of the university and must ever remain the true ideal of a living University." — Gyanendra Nath Chakravarty, First Vice-Chancellor of Lucknow University, during his speech on the passing of the Lucknow University Act in 1920, in the Legislative Council.

The Court of the University was constituted in March 1921, with the first meeting held on 21 March 1921, presided over by the Chancellor. The other university authorities, including the Executive Council, Academic Council, and various faculties, were established in August and September 1921. Statutory and non-statutory committees and boards were formed over time.

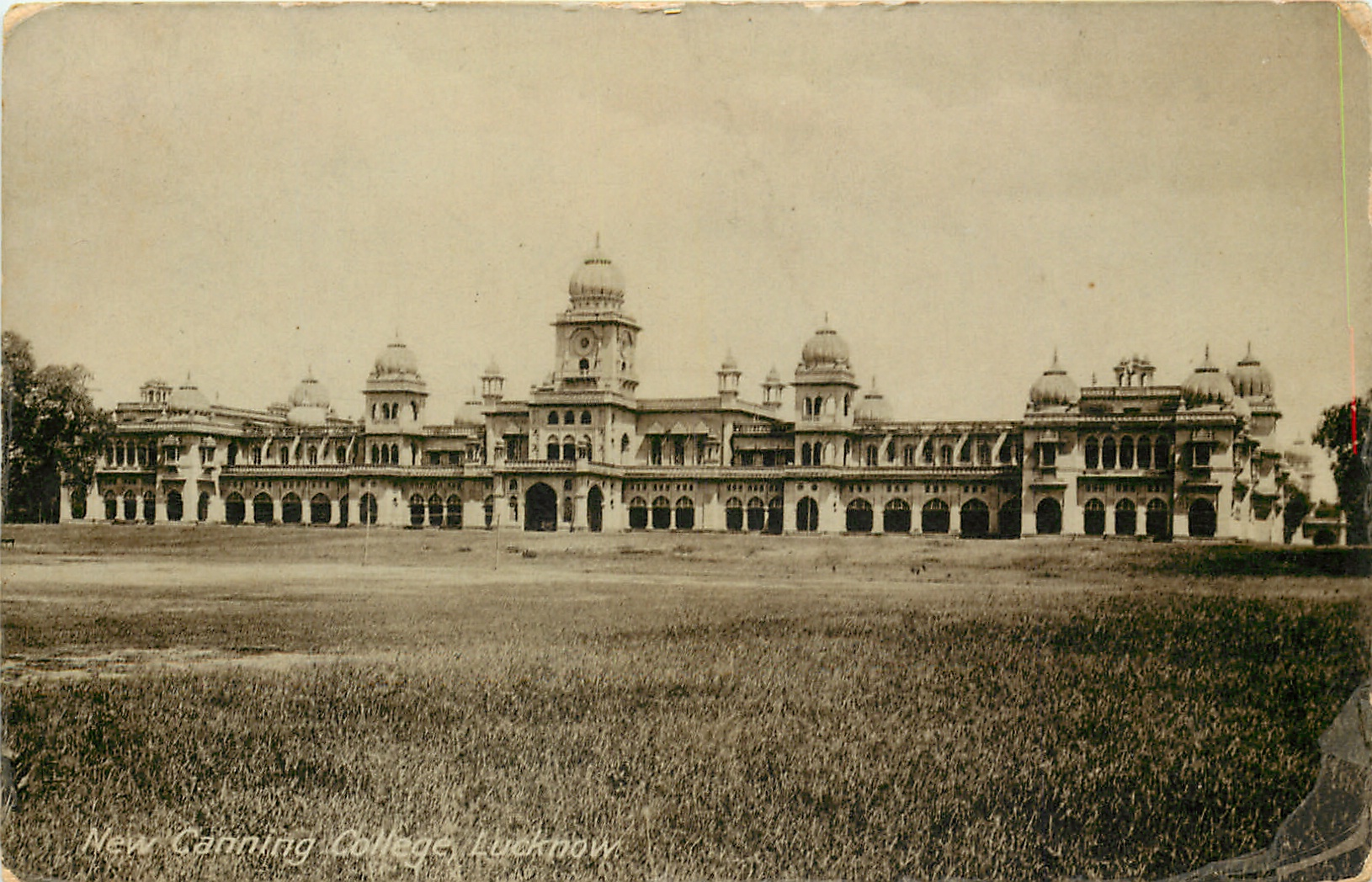

On 17 July 1921, the University began formal and informal teaching, with classes in the Faculties of Arts, Science, Commerce, and Law conducted at Canning College and those for the Faculty of Medicine held at King George's Medical College and Hospital. The Canning College was officially handed over to the University on 1 July 1922, although its facilities had been made available to the University for teaching and residence before this date. Additionally, the King George's Medical College and Hospital were transferred to the University on 1 March 1921.

The development of the University occurred in stages, with the following three colleges providing the foundational structure and support:

1. King George's Medical College (now King George's Medical University)
2. Canning College
3. Isabella Thoburn College

The Lucknow University Act, 1920, was later repealed by the Uttar Pradesh State Universities Act, 1973, which redefined the governance and administration of universities in the state. The Canning College Act, 1922 (Uttar Pradesh Act No. 7 of 1922) also played a role in this educational evolution.

== Campus ==
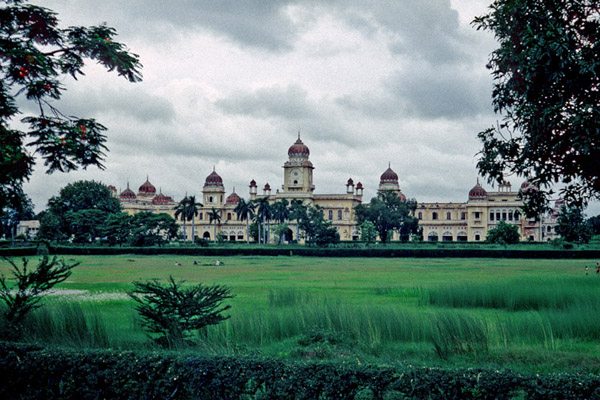
Old Campus Of Lucknow University

In the early days, the Canning College had no building of its own, and the scene of its activity periodically changed as one or other building proved unsuitable or insufficient. During the first twelve years, the college was shifted from its original location, the Aminuddaulah Palace, to a number of places, one after another, including the Lal Baradari. At last, it was housed in its own building at Kaisar Bagh. The foundation stone of this new building was laid by the Viceroy, Sir John Lawrence, as far back as 13 November 1867, but the work of construction was not completed until 1878. On 15 November of that year, Sir George Couper, Lt. Commissioner of Avadh, formally opened the new building.

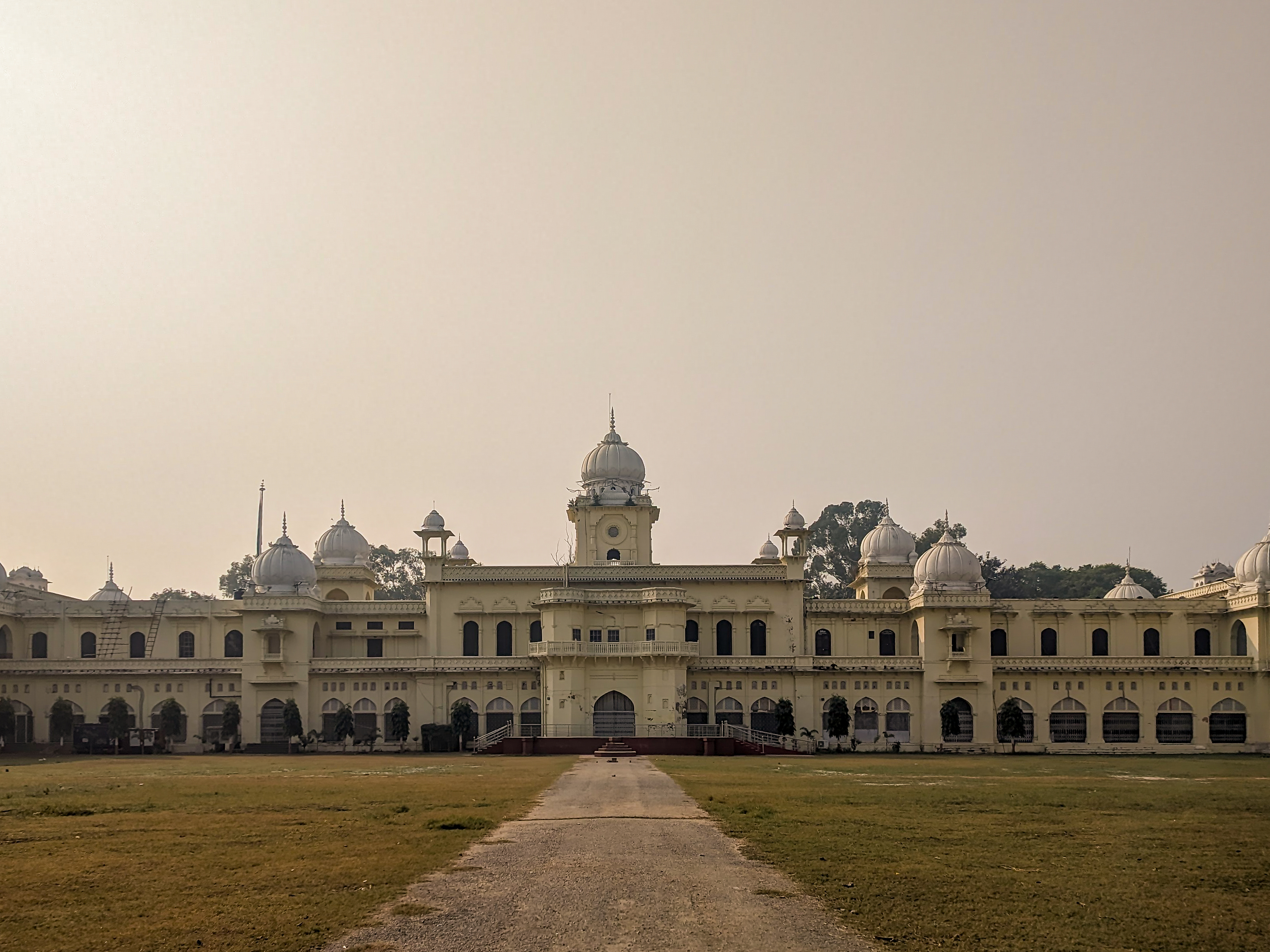

The University has three main libraries, apart from each department having its own. The Central Library of the university known as the Tagore Library, established in 1941, is one of the richest libraries in the country. It was designed by Sir Walter Burley Griffin, the designer of Australian capital city of Canberra. It has 5.25 lakh books, 50,000 journals and approximately 10,000 copies of approved Ph.D. and D.Litt. dissertations. The Cooperative Lending library was established in 1966 to lend books to economically under privileged graduate and post graduate students for the whole session to be restored only after their examinations are over.

The university also provides residential facilities to teachers, students and non-teaching staff. There are overall 18 hostels for boys and girls in the university. Kailash Hall and Nivedita Hall can house nearly 600 female students.

During the past 30 years, there has been an extension of the University Campus by State Government near the Institute of Engineering and Technology.

== Organisation and administration ==
=== Governance ===
The University of Lucknow is governed by the provisions of the University of Lucknow Act. The Governor of Uttar Pradesh serves as the Chancellor, while the Vice-Chancellor is the principal executive and academic officer responsible for the administration of the university. The university's governance structure includes statutory authorities such as the Executive Council, Academic Council, Finance Committee, and Court, which oversee administrative, academic, financial, and policy matters. Day-to-day administration is carried out through various faculties, departments, and administrative offices under the supervision of the Vice-Chancellor.

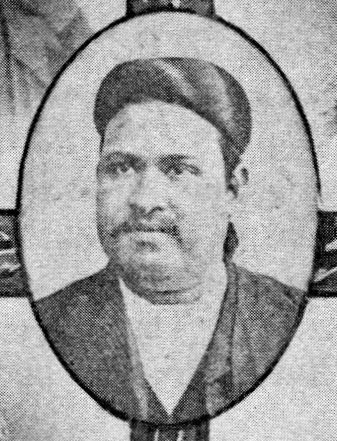
G.N. Chakravarti was appointed as the first Vice-Chancellor by Harcourt Butler, on December 16, 1920

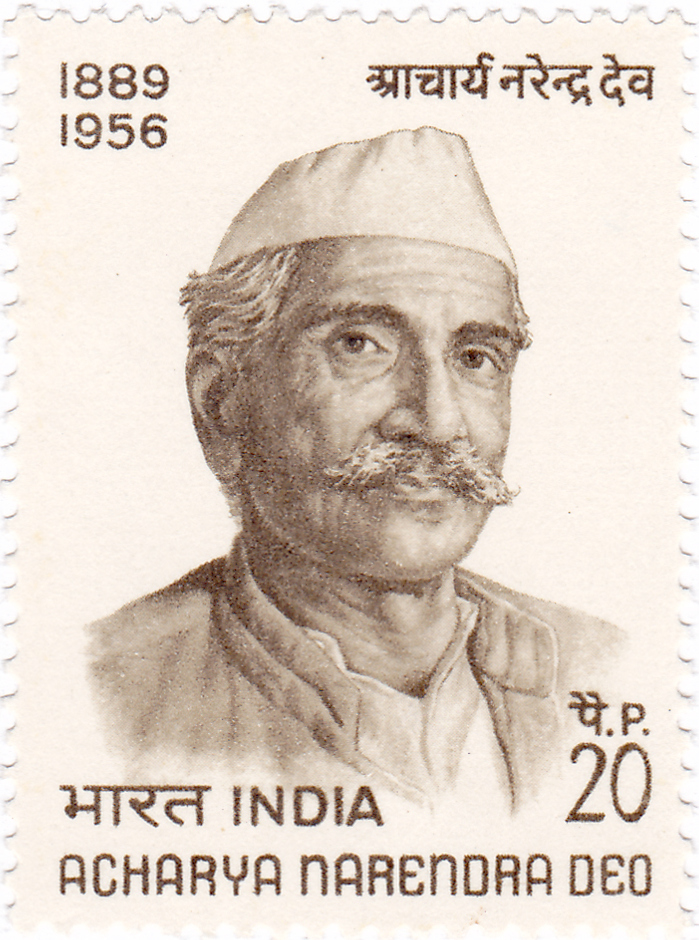
Acharya Narendra Dev served as Vice-Chancellor of Lucknow University from 1947 to 1951, immediately following India's independence.

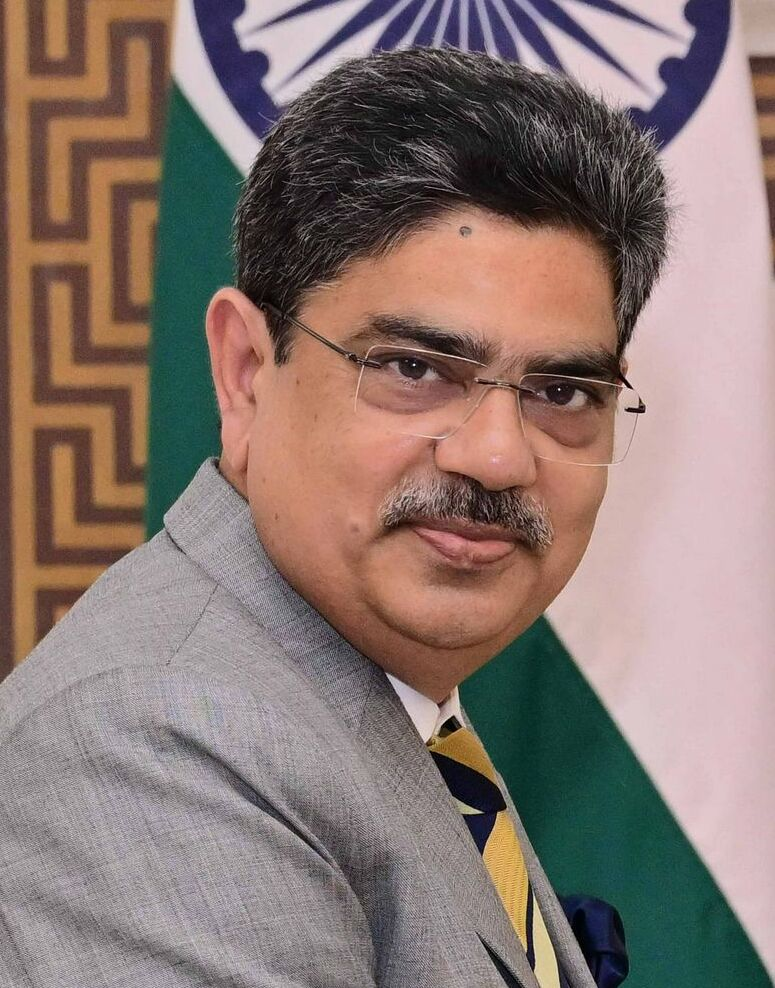
Prof. Alok Kumar Rai (2019–2025), 40th Vice-Chancellor of Lucknow University.

=== Vice-Chancellors ===
The vice-chancellor of the University of Lucknow is the chief executive and leader of the University of Lucknow. The following people have been vice-chancellors of the University of Lucknow:

- 1920 – Gyanendra Nath Chakravarti
- 1926 – Matthew Brown Cameron
- 1930 – Jagat Narain Mulla
- 1932 – Raghunath Paranjpye
- 1938 – Sheik Muhammad Habibullah
- 1941 – Raja Maharaj Singh
- 1941 – Biseshwar Dayal Seth
- 1947 – Acharya Narendra Dev
- 1951 – Acharya Jugul Kishore
- 1955 – Radha Kamal Mukherjee
- 1958 – K. A. Subramania Iyer
- 1960 – Kali Prasad
- 1961 – Randhir Singh
- 1961 – A. Vittal Rao
- 1968 – Mukund Behari Lal
- 1971 – Gopal Tripathi
- 1973 – Ashok Kumar Mustafi
- 1975 – Rajendra Vir Singh
- 1978 – Girija Shankar Mishra
- 1979 – Girija Prasad Pandey
- 1981 – Radha Prakash Agarwal
- 1982 – Ratan Shankar Mishra
- 1985 – Shambhu Nath Jha
- 1986 – Sheetla Prasad Nagendra
- 1989 – Hari Krishna Awasthi
- 1992 – Mahendra Singh Sodha
- 1995 – Suraj Prasad Singh
- 1997 – Ramesh Chandra
- 1998 – K. K. Kaul
- 1999 – Roop Rekha Verma
- 2002 – Devendra Pratap Singh
- 2005 – Shiv Bahadur Singh
- 2008 – Ram Prakash Singh
- 2009 – Ajaib Singh Brar
- 2009 – Upendra Nath Dwivedi
- 2012 – Manoj Kumar Mishra
- 2013 – Gopabandhu Patnaik
- 2016 – Surendra Pratap Singh
- 2019 – Alok Kumar Rai
- 2025 – Manuka Khanna
- 2026 – Jai Prakash Saini

=== Faculties and departments ===
Faculty of Arts
Ancient Indian History and Archaeology	Anthropology	Arabic	Defence Studies
Economics	English and Modern European Languages	Geography	Hindi and Modern Indian Language
Home Science	Journalism and Mass Communication	Jyotir Vigyan	Library and Information Science
Linguistics	Medieval and Modern Indian History	Oriental Studies in Arabic and Persian	Oriental Studies in Sanskrit
Persian	Philosophy	Physical Education	Political Science
Psychology	Public Administration	Sanskrit and Prakrit Language	Social Work
Sociology	Urdu	Western History	
Faculty of Management Studies
Management Sciences
Faculty of Commerce
Applied Economics		Commerce	
Faculty of Education
Education
Faculty of Fine Arts
Commercial Arts	Fine Arts	Sculpture	
Faculty of Law
Law
Faculty of Sciences (FoS)
Biochemistry	Botany	Chemistry	Computer Science
Environmental science (under Botany)	Geology	Mathematics and Astronomy	Microbiology (under Botany)
Physics	Statistics	Zoology	
Faculty of Engineering & Technology
Computer Science & Engineering		Electronic and Communication Engineering	
Civil Engineering		Mechanical Engineering	
Electrical Engineering		Applied Science & Humanities	
Faculty of Yoga and Alternative Medicine
Yoga	Naturopathy		
Faculty of Ayurveda
Ayurveda			

== Academics ==
Academic unit	Founded
Canning College	1864
College of Arts and Crafts	1911
Arts	1920
Science	1921
Law	1921
Commerce	1921
Oriental Studies	1921
Management	1956
Abhinavagupta Institute of Aesthetics and Shaiva Philosophy	1968
Education	1978
Engineering and Technology	1984
Yoga and Alternative Medicine	2020
Agriculture	2025

The University offers 15 undergraduate and 67 postgraduate programmes, serving more than 16,000 students, and is supported by 478 academic and 1,927 non-academic staff.

=== Institutes ===
- Dr Giri Lal Gupta Institute of Public Health
- Dr Shanker Dayal Sharma Institute of Democracy
- Institute of Management Sciences
- Institute of Tourism Studies
- Institute of Women and Gender Studies
- Institute for Pharmaceutical Sciences
- Institute of New and Renewable Energy
- Institute of Mass Communication in Science & Technology
- Institute for Development of Advanced Computing
- Institute of Development Studies
- Institute of Food Processing & Technology
- Institute of Hydrocarbon, Energy and Geo-Resources
- Institute for Wildlife Sciences
- Institute of Advanced Molecular Genetics & Infectious Diseases

=== Centres ===
==== Regional Centre for Urban & Environmental Studies (under Ministry of Housing and Urban Affairs) ====
Source:

==== Research Centres ====
- A. P. J. Abdul Kalam Centre for Innovation
- Population Research Centre
- Centre for Advanced Studies in Social Work
- Malaviya Mission Teacher Training Centre
- Centre for Cultural Texts, Records and Translation of Indian Literatures
- J. K. Institute of Sociology, Ecology and Human Relations
- Institute of Human Consciousness and Yogic Sciences
- Centre of Online, Open and Distance Learning

=== Rankings ===
University rankings

General – international
- QS (Asia) (2024): 244

General – India
- NIRF (Universities) (2024): 97

Law – India
- NIRF (2024): 23

The NIRF (National Institutional Ranking Framework) ranked it 29th in Law and 98th overall in India in 2025.

== Notable people ==
=== Alumni ===
Notable University of Lucknow alumni include:

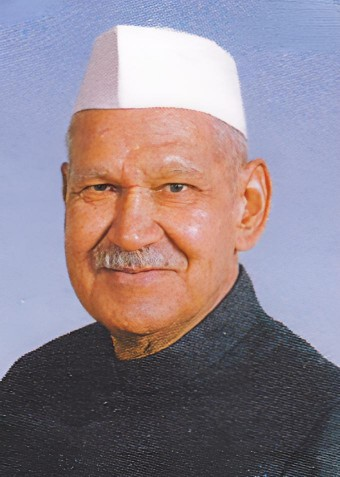
Shankar Dayal Sharma (LL.M.), 9th President of India

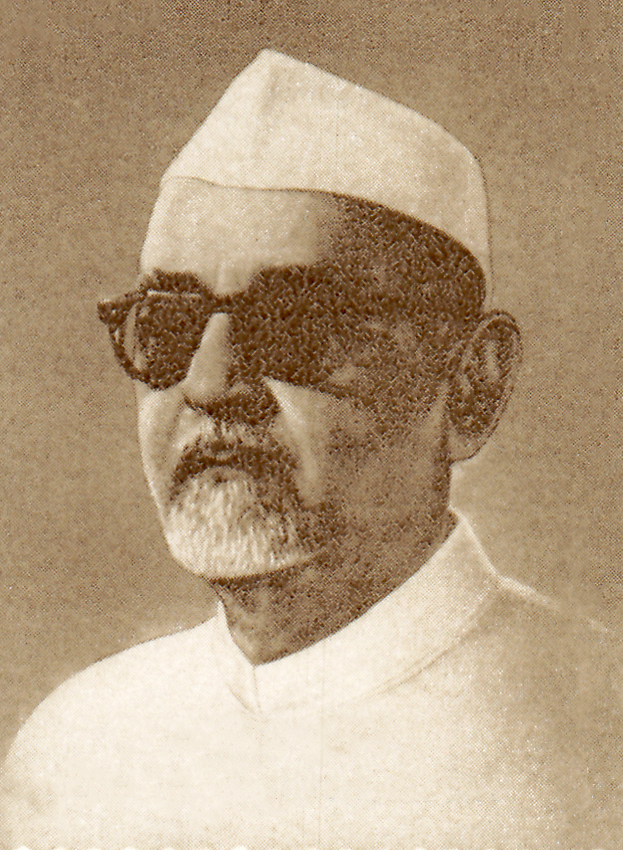
Zakir Husain (B.A. 1918), 3rd President of India

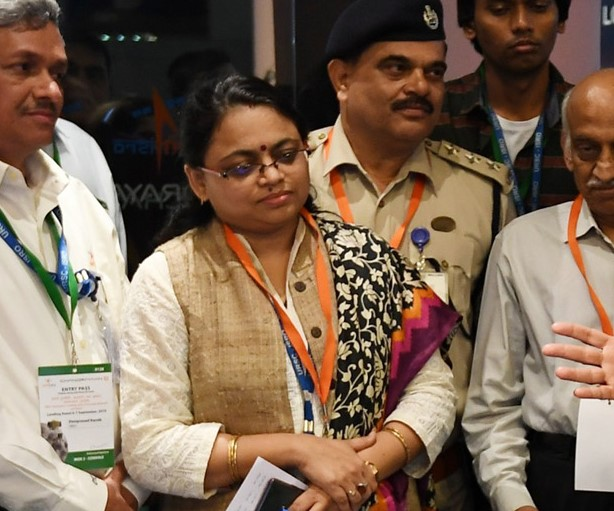
Ritu Karidhal (M.Sc. Physics, 1996), ISRO Aerospace scientist an known as the "Rocket Woman of India"

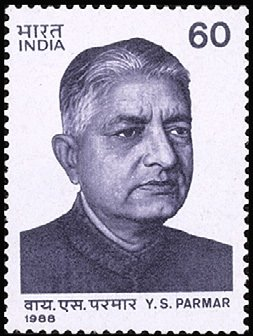
Yashwant Singh Parmar (Ph.D, 1944), 1st Chief Minister of Himachal Pradesh

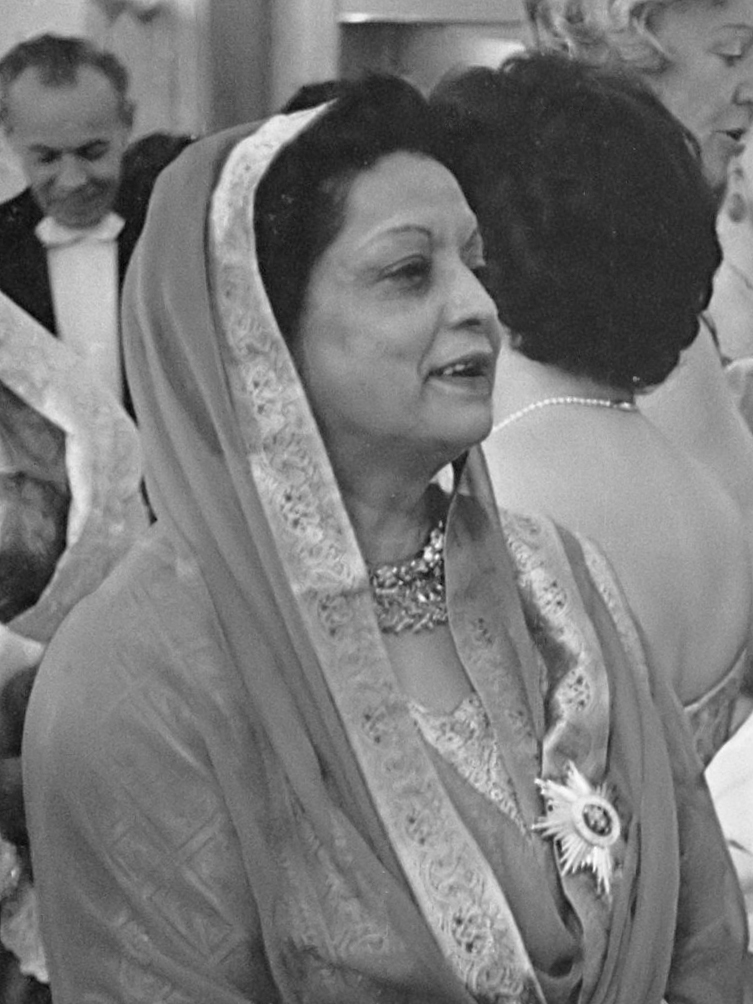
Ra'ana Liaquat Ali Khan (MA, 1929), First Lady of Pakistan and Sindh's first female governor.

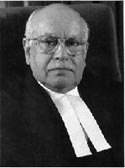
Adarsh Sein Anand (LL.B., 1960), 29th Chief Justice of India

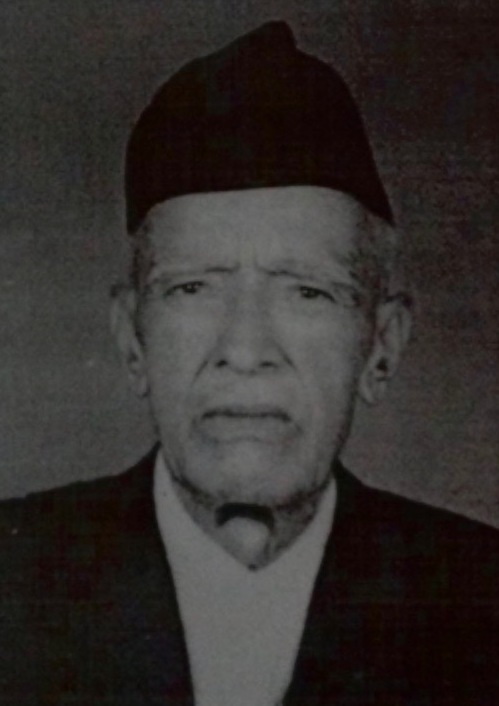
Ratna Bahadur Bista (LL.B.), 5th Chief Justice of Nepal

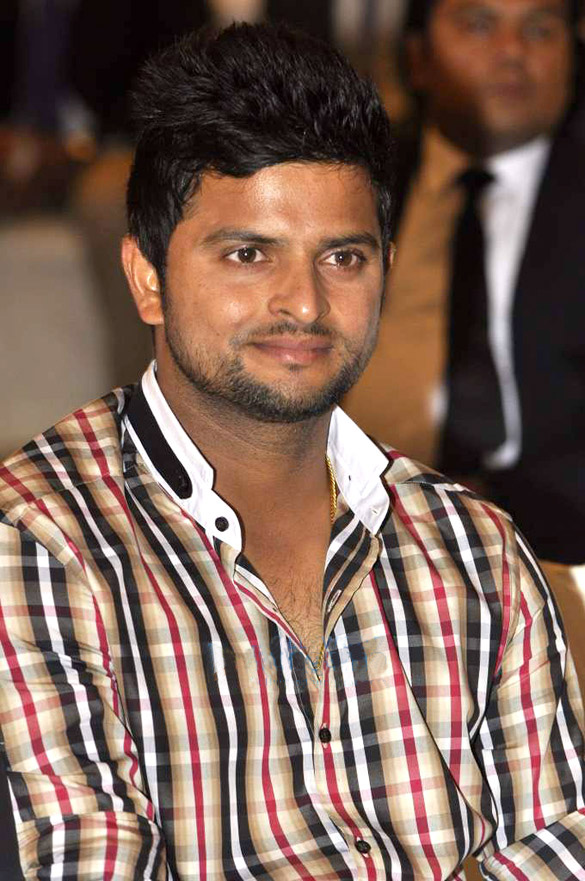
Suresh Raina (B.A., 2006), Former Indian international cricketer; member of the Indian teams that won the 2011 ICC Cricket World Cup

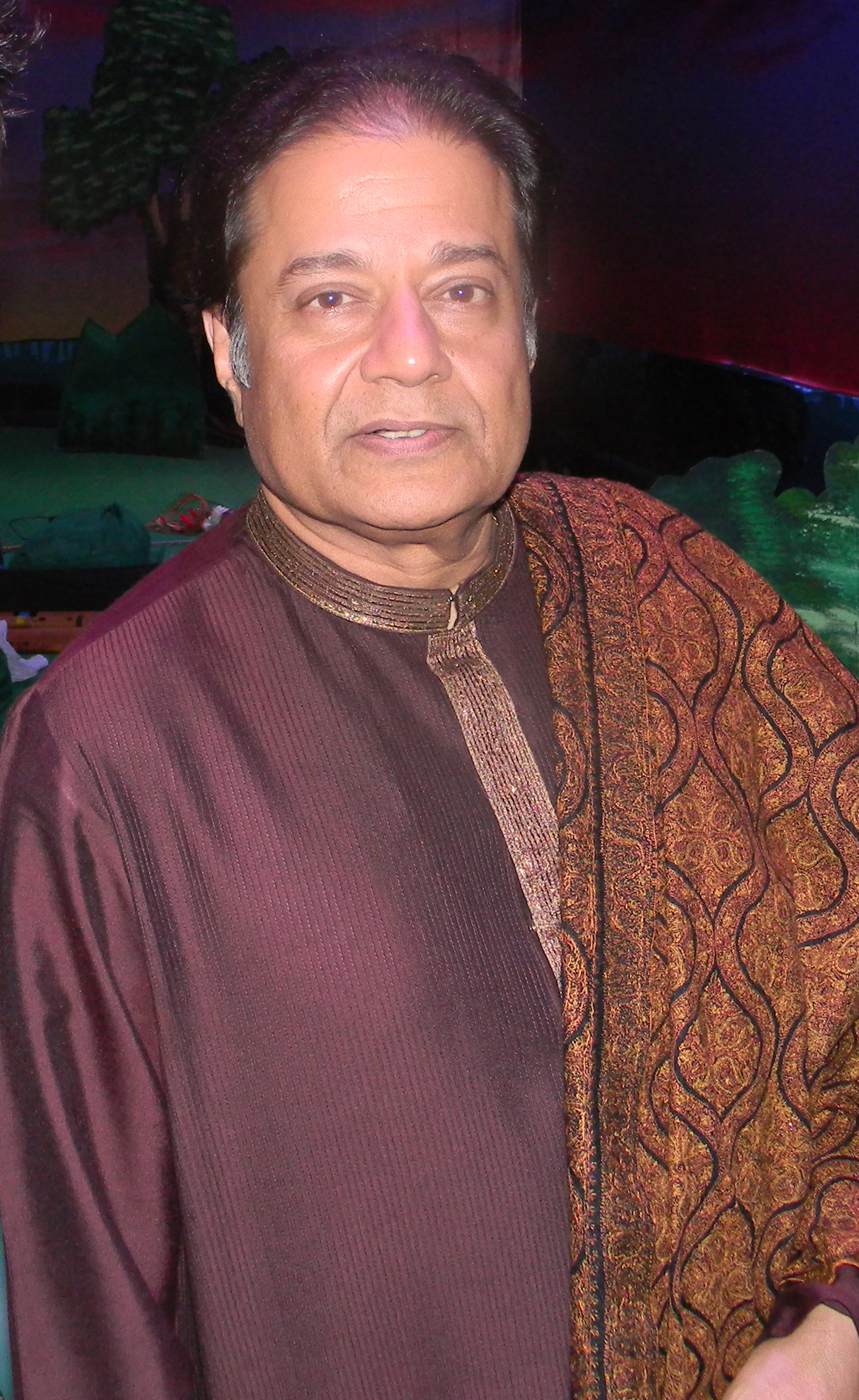
Anup Jalota (B.A., 1974) – Bhajan and ghazal singer, popularly known as the "Bhajan Samrat"

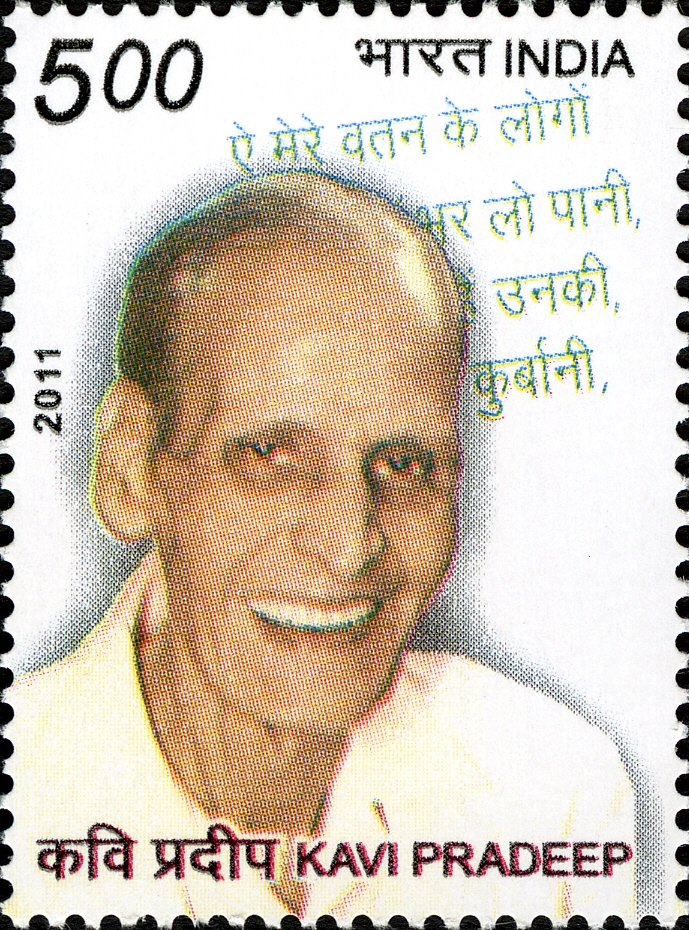
Kavi Pradeep (B.A., 1939) – Indian poet, lyricist, and patriot known as Rashtrakavi (National Poet)

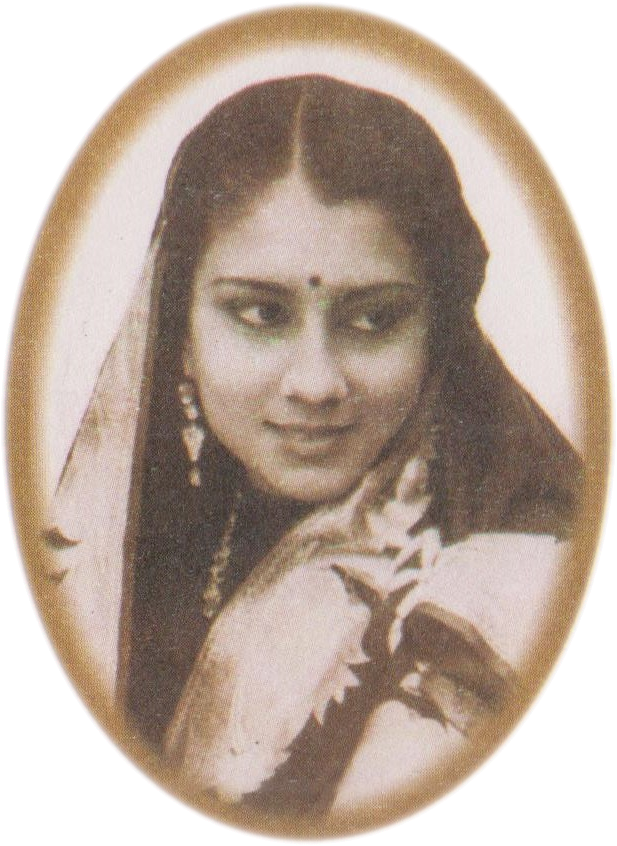
Vijaya Raje Scindia (B.A. ) – Rajmata of Gwalior

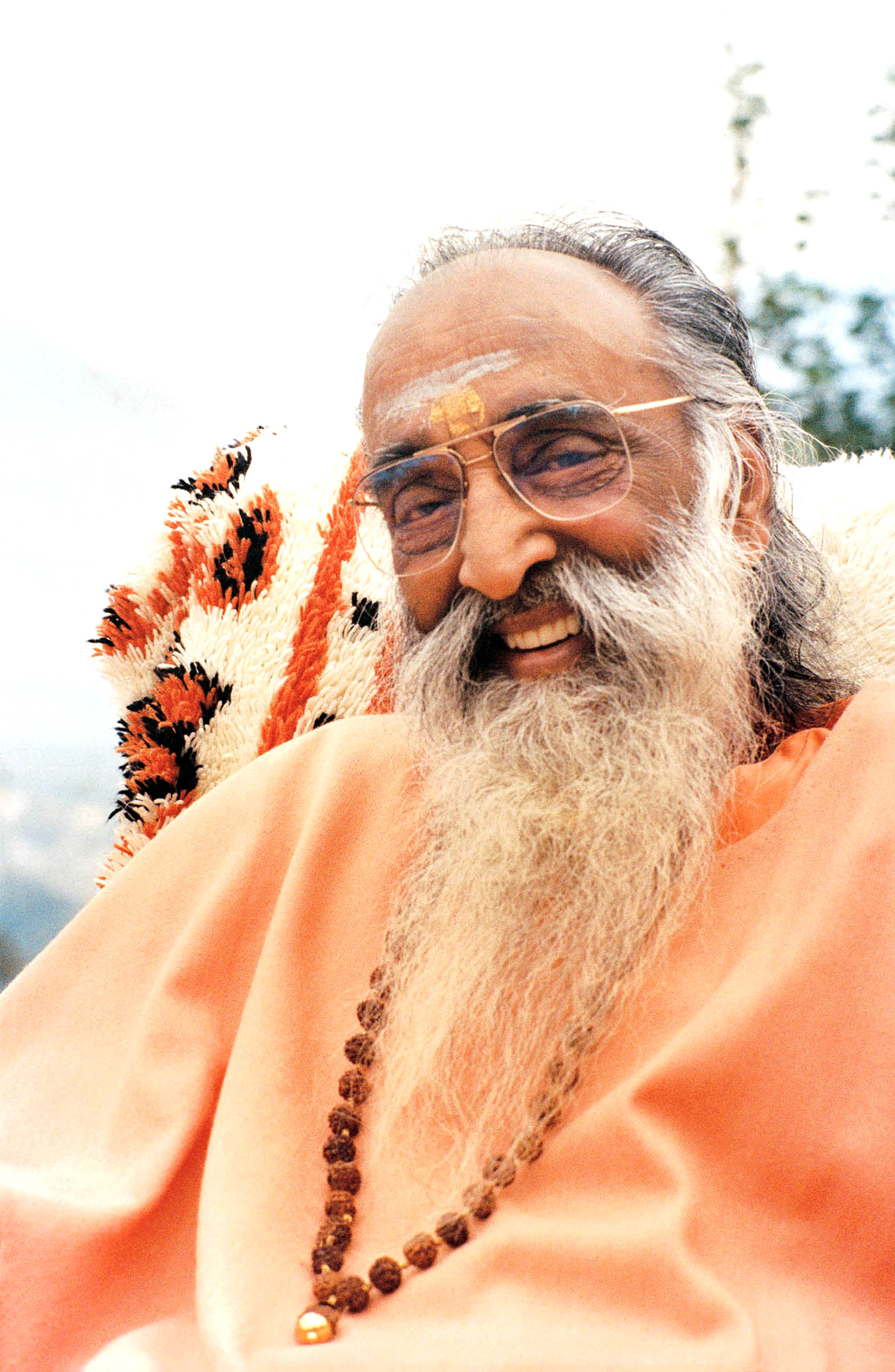
Swami Chinmayananda (M.A. English; LL.B., 1943), Spiritual leader, founder of the Chinmaya Mission, and co-founder of the Vishva Hindu Parishad

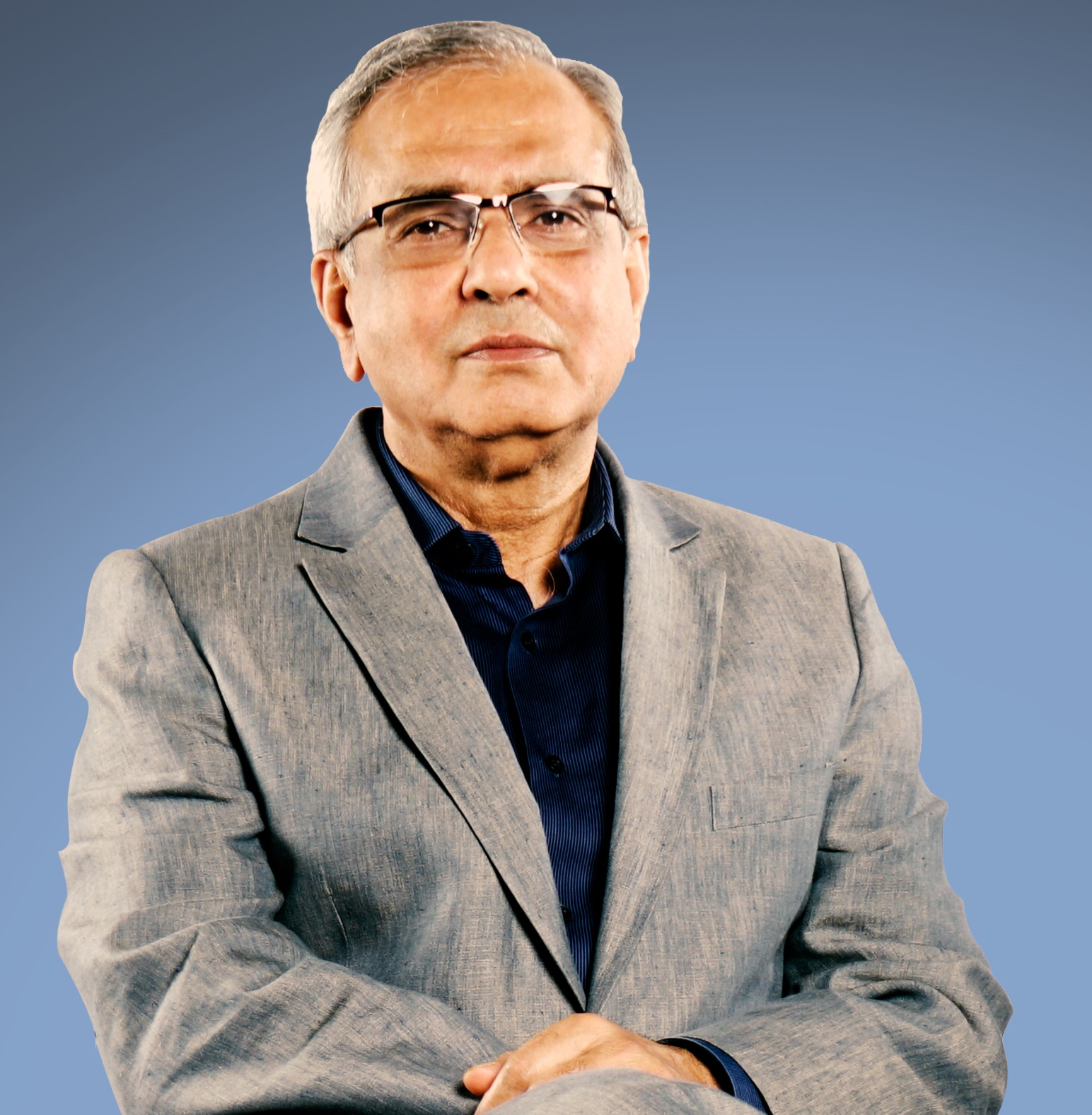
Rajiv Kumar (Ph.D, 1978), 2nd Vice-chairman of NITI Aayog

The university's alumni include Judges of the Supreme Court of India and various High Courts, distinguished academicians, public leaders, and holders of constitutional offices, including former Presidents of India, Chief Ministers, and Governors.

=== Honorary alumni ===
The University of Lucknow presented its first honorary degrees (D. Litt) in October 1922 during first convocation at Brown Hall to Harcourt Butler.This accolade has been bestowed on several prominent Indian figures, a wide range of distinguished individuals from both the academic and non-academic worlds. Honorary degrees are approved by the Executive Council of the university and finalized with the consent of the Governor of Uttar Pradesh, who serves as the ex-officio Chancellor of state universities.The degree is traditionally awarded to the recipient at the university's annual convocation ceremony.

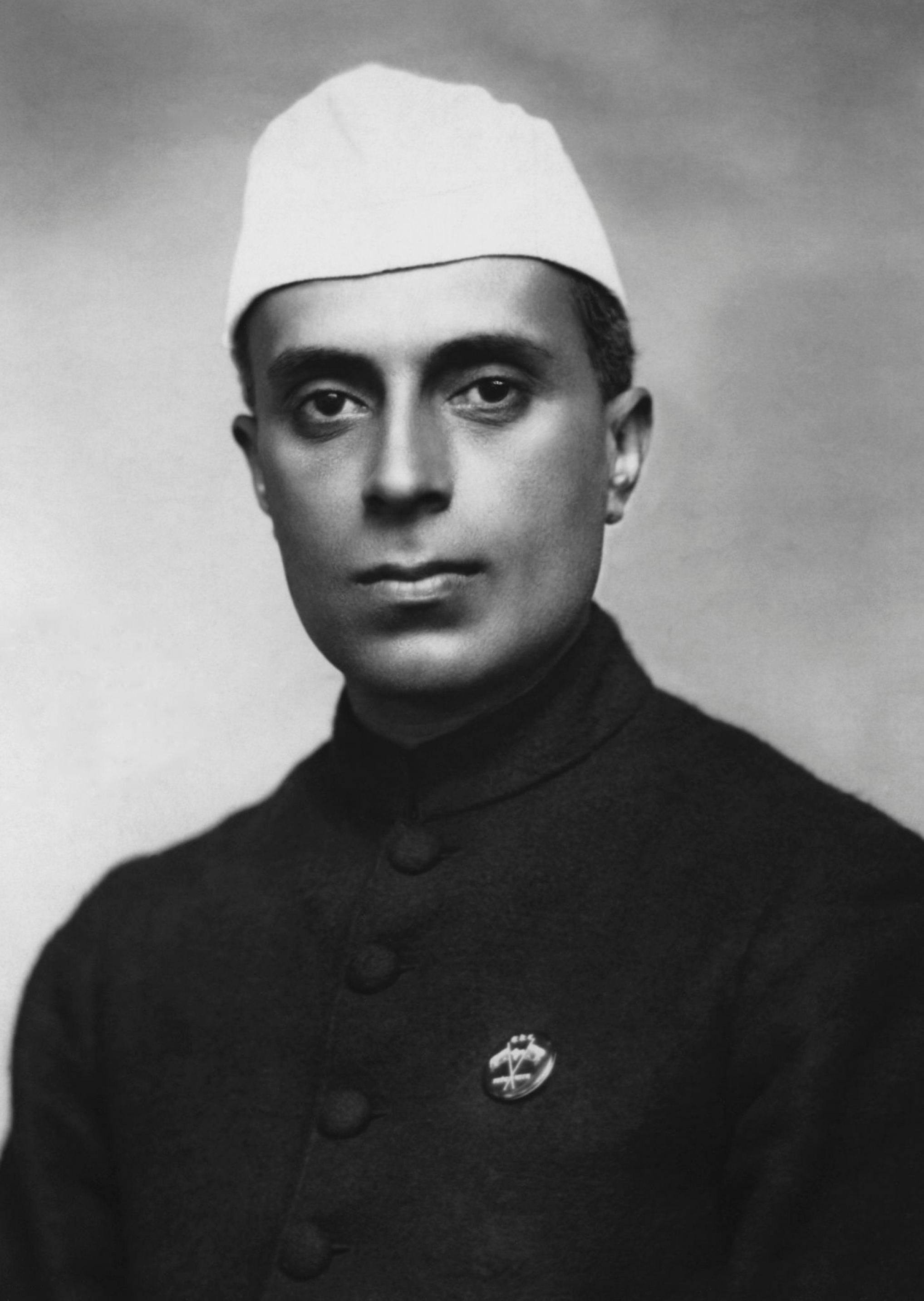
Jawaharlal Nehru (1949), 1st Prime Minister of India

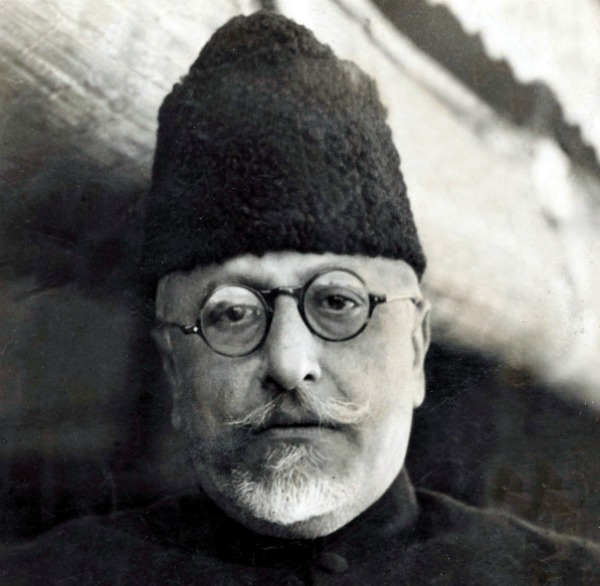
Maulana Azad (1949), 1st Education Minister of India

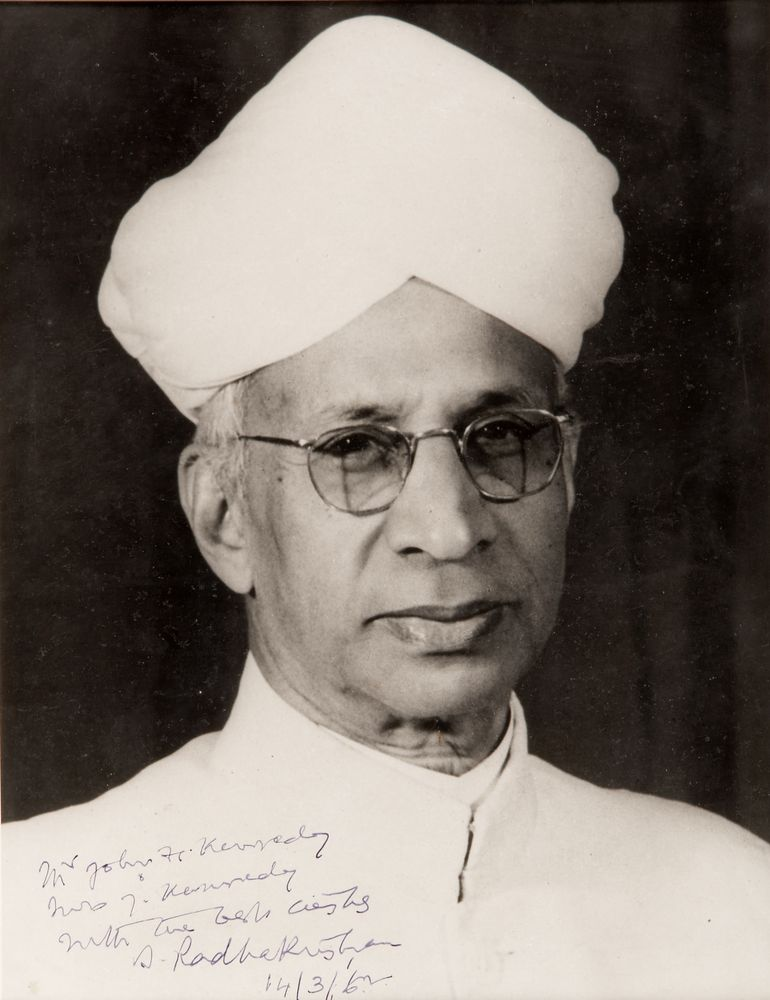
Sarvepalli Radhakrishnan (1949), 2nd President of India

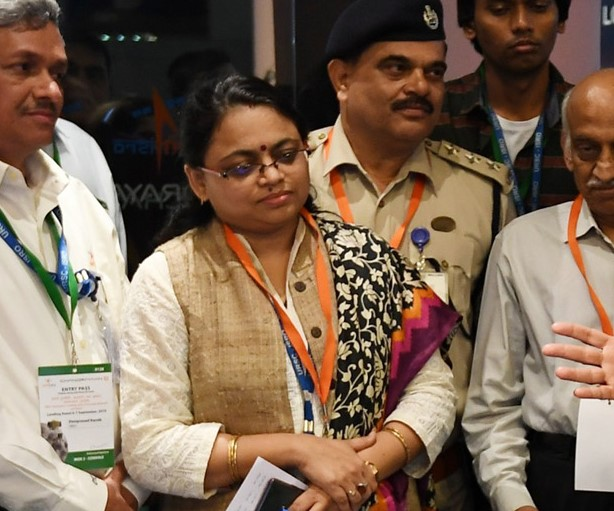
Ritu Karidhal (DSc, 2019), ISRO scientist and Chandrayaan-2 Mission Director

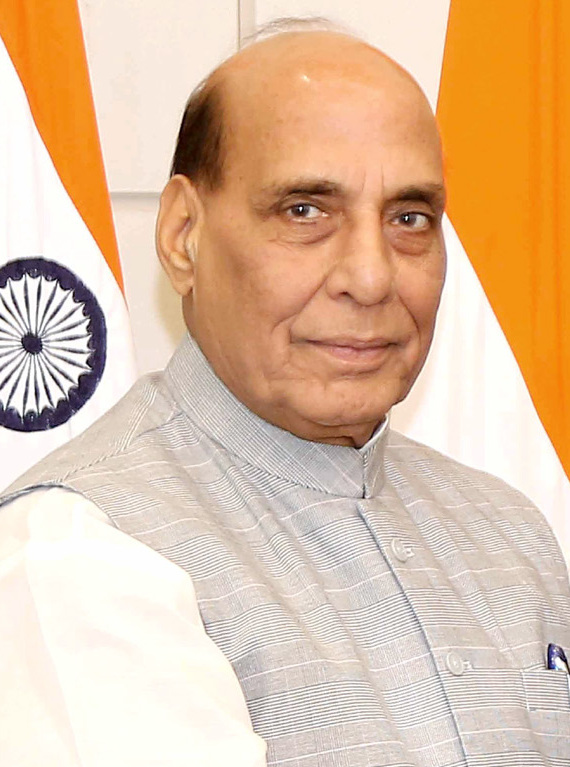
Rajnath Singh (DSc, 2017), 29th Defence Minister of India

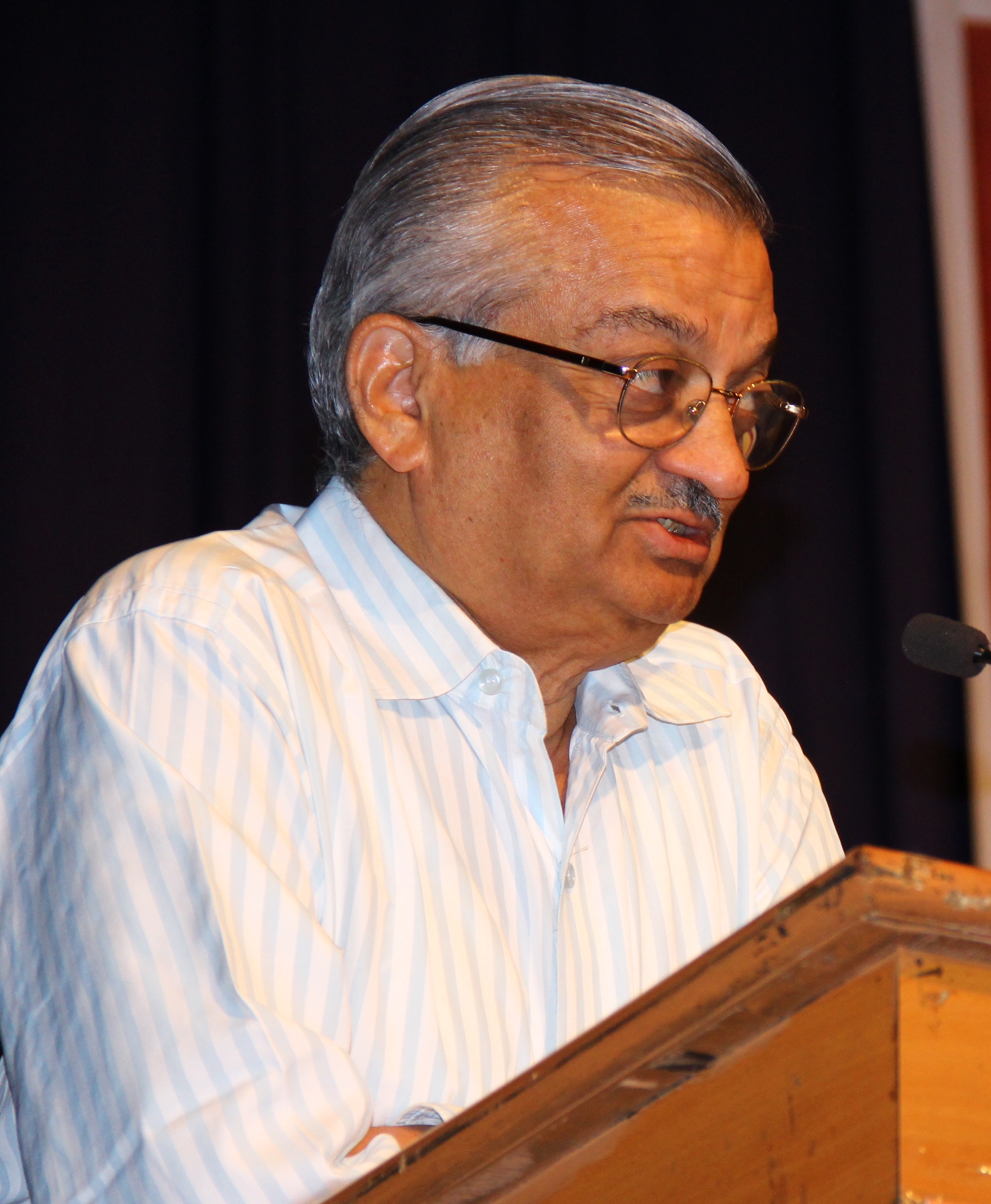
Dr. Anil Kakodkar (DSc, 2009), Eminent nuclear scientist and former chairman of Atomic Energy Commission of India

== See also ==
- University Ground, University of Lucknow
- Association of Indian Universities
- List of universities in India
