= Ali Khan Mahmudabad =

Indian academic (born 1982)

- علی خان محمودآباد
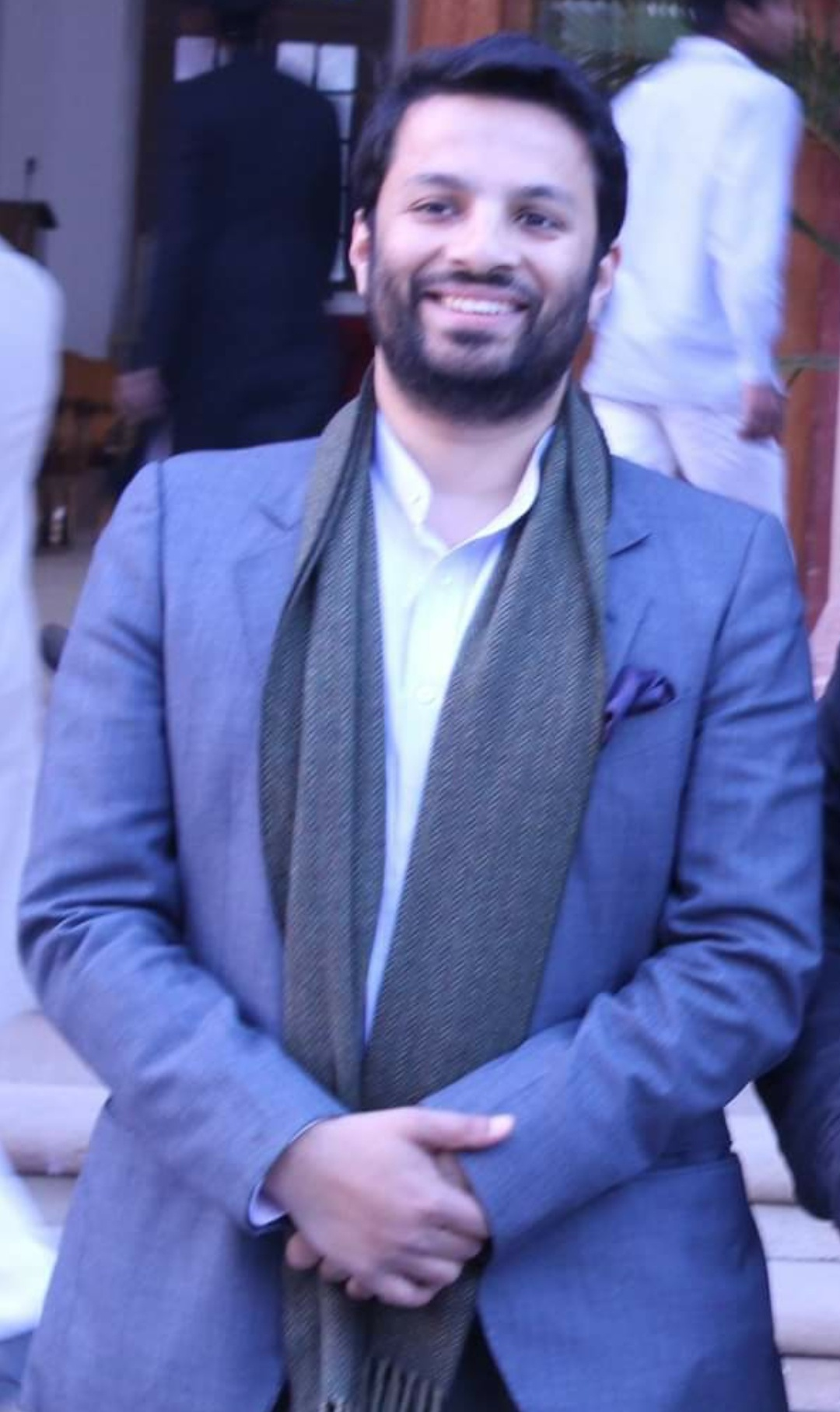
- Mahmudabad at John Strachey Hall

Personal details
- Born: 2 December 1982 (age 43) Lucknow, Uttar Pradesh, India
- Party: Samajwadi Party
- Spouse: Onaiza Drabu
- Relations: Mohammad Amir Ahmed Khan (paternal grandfather), Jagat Singh Mehta (maternal grandfather), Haseeb Drabu (father in-law)
- Education: University of Damascus, Syria; Cambridge University, England, UK
- Occupation: Historian, poet, professor, columnist
- Website: www.ashoka.edu.in/profile/m-a-a-khan/

Ali Khan Mahmudabad (born 2 December 1982) is an Indian historian, political scientist, writer, poet, and activist. He currently serves as the head of the Department of Political Science at Ashoka University in Sonipat, Haryana. Known for his contributions to the Islamic studies, South Asian politics, and modern history, Ali is also noted for his writings on the Middle East and for his political engagements in India.

== Early life ==
Ali was born to Mohammad Amir Mohammad Khan in Lucknow, Uttar Pradesh, into a prominent aristocratic family historically associated with the Mahmudabad Estate. His grandfather, Mohammad Amir Ahmed Khan, was the last ruling raja of Mahmudabad, India and a patron of the All-India Muslim League before the partition of India in 1947.

Ali began his education at La Martiniere College in Lucknow, later continuing his studies in the United Kingdom. He attended King's College School, Wimbledon till 1996, and graduated from Winchester College in 2001. He earned his MPhil and PhD in Historical Studies from the University of Cambridge, focusing on political thought in Muslim South Asia. He also studied Arabic at the University of Damascus in Syria.

== Academic career ==
Ali joined Ashoka University as a faculty member in the Department of Political Science, where he currently serves as an associate professor and Head of the Department. His academic work focuses on intellectual history, political theology, nationalism, and the interplay between religion and politics in South Asia.

Before his PhD, he obtained his MPhil, also from Cambridge. He wrote a thesis on trans-national Shi‘a Muslim networks in the early 20th century between South Asia and the Middle East which got published in the Journal of the Royal Asiatic Society and became a part of the book: The Shi‘a in Modern South Asian.

He has published research on these subjects and has contributed articles and opinion pieces to various publications, including writings on Syria, Iran, and Iraq. His work has appeared in platforms such as National Geographic.

Ali has a column in Urdu for The Inquilab. He also writes for online and print publications, including the Caravan Magazine, The Indian Express, Times of India, The Outlook Magazine, Hindustan Times, Business Standard, Daily News and Analysis, Tehelka magazine and The Sunday Guardian in India. He also writes for a number of publications from other parts of the world like The Guardian, The Straits Times, and the Huffington Post. In addition to his teaching and research responsibilities, he regularly participates in academic conferences and public discussions on historical and political issues.

== Political career ==
Ali joined the Samajwadi Party in 2018 and served as its national spokesperson from 2019 to 2022. During his tenure, he was regarded as one of the close associates of party president Akhilesh Yadav and was active in representing the party's positions on various public platforms.

Since 2022, Ali has not held any official position within the party and has remained inactive in electoral or organizational politics.

== Arrest and controversy ==
On 18 May 2025, Ali was arrested in Delhi in connection with social media remarks he made concerning "Operation Sindoor," a series of Indian military strikes targeting the areas in Pakistan. The arrest followed a complaint filed by a leader of the Bharatiya Janata Yuva Morcha (BJYM), the youth wing of the Bharatiya Janata Party (BJP).

The controversy arose from a series of posts made by Ali on 8 May 2025, which were perceived by some as critical of the military operation. His detention drew criticism from academic and civil rights communities, who expressed concern over freedom of expression and the targeting of intellectuals for dissenting views. The legal case reached India's highest court, which granted Ali bail but restrained him from further commenting on the 2025 Pahalgam attack as well as Operation Sindoor. A three-member Special Investigation Team(SIT) has also been setup to look at the charges against him. India's National Human Rights Commission (NHRC) has sent a notice to the Haryana Director General of Police regarding the arrest. The NHRC stated that the arrest appears to be a violation of Ali Khan Mahmudabad's human rights.

== Works ==
Besides being a columnist for Sahāfat (Urdu newspaper) and Aalami Samay (Urdu magazine), Ali has also contributed to the following books:

- A Leaf Turns Yellow: the Sufis of Awadh: "Reliving a Sacrifice"
- Lucknow: a city between cultures: "Lucknow: a binding legacy"
- The Shi‘a in Modern South Asian: "Local nodes of a trans-national network: a case study of a Shi‘i family in Awadh 1900- 1950"
- Poetry of Belonging: Muslim Imaginings of India 1850–1950

His translation work includes:

- Break of Dawn , a translation of Aghaaz-e-Sahr by Khan Mahboob Tarzi
