= Metropole Hotel (Nainital) =

Former heritage hotel in Uttarakhand, India

Metropole Hotel is a defunct heritage hotel located in Nainital, Uttarakhand. Built in 1880 by the British Raj, it is the oldest hotel in the city. It is best known for its Nainital-pattern-roofing, a type that uses flat non-corrugated, galvanized tin plates.

== History ==
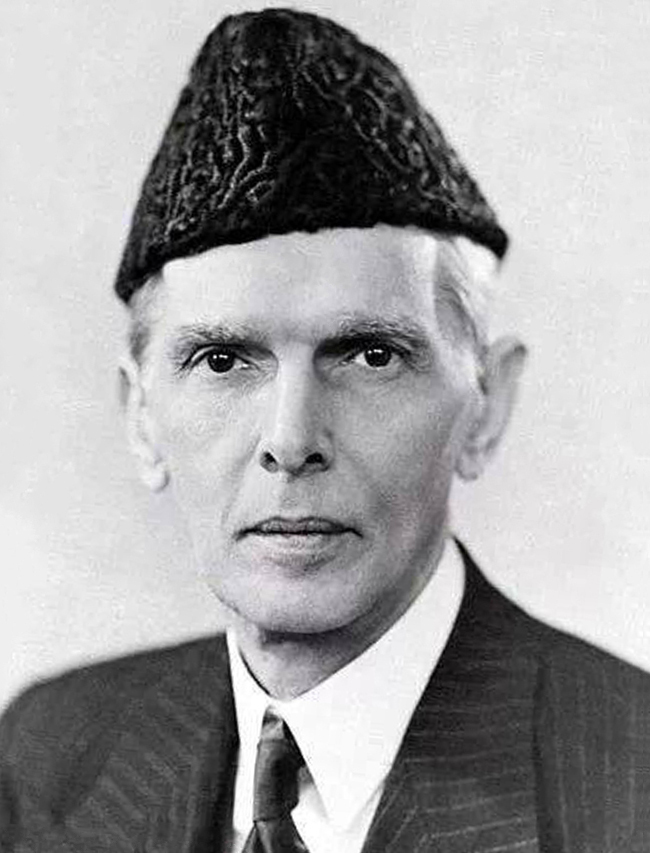
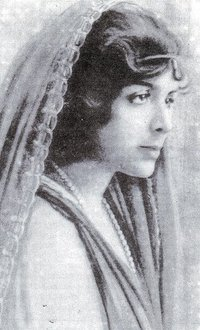
Jinnah and his second wife Rattanbai are known to have spent their honeymoon here

Metropole Hotel was built in 1880 by the British Raj. Spread over 10-11 acres close to the Nainital Lake, it was the preferred haunt for the who's who at the time. It soon became popular for its flat non-corrugated, galvanized tin-roof and soon the British decided to replicate it across the country. The roofing design came to be known as the 'Nainital-pattern-roofing'. It is known that former Pakistan founder Mohammad Ali Jinnah spent his honeymoon in the hotel in April 1919. Hungarian painter Elizabeth Sass-Brunner is said to have created the 'Last Winter' inspired by the hotel's surroundings while she was one of its guests.

The hotel was later owned by Mohammad Amir Ahmed Khan, the raja of Mahmudabad till he moved to Pakistan after the partition. According to multiple estimates, it had over 16 cottages, 75 rooms, and 5 tennis courts. According to author Ganesh Saili, before moving to Pakistan, the king handed the reins of the hotel to a Parsi couple who ran the property as a hostelry. It is during their management that Jinnah and other famous personalities stayed there as guests.

Once regarded as the finest hotel in Nainital, it was designated an enemy property in the aftermath of the Sino-Indian War. Subsequently, the hotel went into disrepair and began to be encroached upon. Its open lands were used by people to build makeshift homes. In 2019, the Uttarakhand state government decided to turn the hotel into a parking spot. In July 2023, occupants of the hotel were asked to vacate the premises by the state high court for demolition.
