= Mohammad Ali Mohammad Khan =

British Raj politician (1878–1931)

Maharaja Sir Mohammad Ali Mohammad Khan Khan Bahadur, KCSI, KCIE
- Born: 4 June 1878
- Died: 23 March 1931 (aged 52)

Maharaja Sir Mohammad Ali Mohammad Khan, Khan Bahadur, KCSI, KCIE (4 June 1878 – 23 March 1931) was the Raja of Mahmudabad from 28 June 1903 to 23 March 1931 and a noted politician, zamindar of British India.

== Raja of Mahmudabad ==
He was son of Raja Sir Mohammad Amir Hasan Khan (1849–1903), the Jagirdar of Taluq of Mahmudabad. He was born at Mahmudabad in Sitapur district of Oudh, British India. After the death of his father in 1903, he became the Raja of Mahmudabad. The estate of Mahmudabad was among the largest estates in United Province. He was succeeded by his son Raja Mohammad Amir Ahmed Khan (1914-1973). The latter was succeeded by Raja Mohammad Amir Mohammad Khan former Member of the Legislative Assembly, (M.L.A.) of Uttar Pradesh.

== Educationist and philanthropist ==
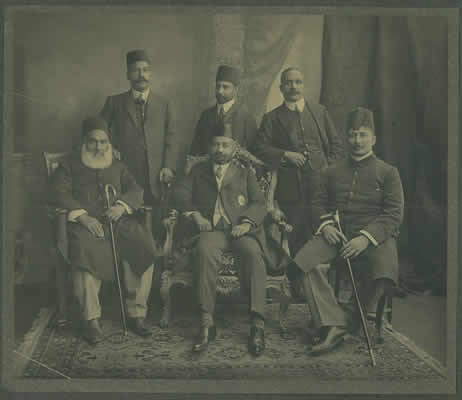
Raja Mahmudabad (seated, center) with leaders of Aligarh Movement.

He played a key role to make Lucknow as the capital of United Province and foundation of Lucknow University and was the founder-member of university in 1920. The idea of starting a University at Lucknow was first mooted by him, who contributed an article to the columns of "The Pioneer" urging the foundation of a University at Lucknow. He and His Highness Maharaja Sir Ejaz Rasul Khan KCIE Kt CSI the Taluqdar of Jahangirabad Raj, both donated one lakh rupees for the purpose of founding university in 1919 conference held by Sir Harcourt Butler, Governor of United Province, thus leading to foundation of University.

He was also appointed a trustee of Muhammadan Anglo-Oriental College in 1906 and had donated fifty thousand rupees for scientific educational development at Muhammadan Anglo-Oriental College of Aligarh. He was also actively involved in the campaign for a Muslim University. On 17 December, when Muhammadan Anglo-Oriental College became Aligarh Muslim University. The Governor General of India, Lord Chelmsford appointed him as its first Vice- Chancellor of Aligarh Muslim University with Begum of Bhopal and Sir Agha Khan, who were respectively appointed as Chancellor and Pro-Chancellor of the Aligarh Muslim University. He immediately gave a generous donation of One Lakh rupees to College fund. He served as the Vice-Chancellor of Aligarh Muslim University from 17 December 1920 to 28 February 1923.

He fully financed the 1904 session of All India Muhammadan Educational Conference held in Lucknow under the chairmanship of Nawab Mohsinul Mulk. Further, he presided over the Muslim Educational Conference of 1909 held at Rangoon.

He also founded the Madrasatul Waizeen, a centre of Shia Islamic education in the city of Lucknow, in memory of his younger brother, Mohammad Ali Ahmad Khan in year 1919.

== Politician and leader ==
Further, he served in various capacities as a Member of United Province Legislative Council from 1904–09; Member of Governor-General's Council 1907–20 and was elected a member of the Imperial Legislative Council in 1908 and was a member for the years 1908–1912. In year 1927 he was elected unopposed as Member of Council of State. Further, he served as the Home Minister for the years 1920–26 and was the first Indian Member of The Administrative Council of Sir Spencer Harcourt Butler, Governor of United Province.

He was the President of the All-India Muslim League conferences held in the years 1917, 1918 and 1928 and as the President of British Indian Association (Oudh Taluqdars) for the years 1917–21 and 1930–31.

When the Indian National Congress leaders, including Motilal Nehru were jailed in Lucknow during Non Co-operation Movement, the Raja sahib helped in their release.

== Honors and styles ==
He held the title of Khan Bhahadur and Maharaja Bahadur title was awarded to him as personal distinction. Further, he was created a K.C.I.E. in 1919 a C.S.I. in 1921 and was promoted to style of K.C.S.I. in 1922

== Poet ==
He was a poet and extensively wrote "Marsia" with pen name of "Mohib".

== Death ==
He died in 1931 and was succeeded by his son, Mohammad Amir Ahmad Khan
