= Mohammad Amir Hasan Khan =

Maharaja Sir Mohammad Amir Hasan Khan, Khan Bahadur, KCIE (1849 - 27 June 1903) was the Raja of Mahmudabad from 1858 to 27 June 1903 and a noted zamindar of British India.

== Raja of Mahmudabad ==
He was son of Raja Mohammad Nawab Ali Khan (d.1858), the Jagirdar of Taluq of Mahmudabad. He was born at Amrota in Sitapur district of Oudh, British India. After death of his father in 1858, he became the Raja of Mahmudabad. He took over management of Taluq in March 1867. The estate of Mahmudabad was among one the largest estate in United Province.

== Honors and styles ==
Following titles have been used by him:

- Amir-ud-daula,
- Sayyid-ul-Mulk,
- Mumtaz Jung
- 4 December 1877 - Sir, KCIE
- 24 May 1883 - Raja
- 5 March 1884 - Khan Bahadur

== Death ==
He died in 1903 and was succeeded by his son, Mohammad Ali Mohammad Khan
