= Mahmudabad Estate =

Indian royal estate

Shaikh Siddiqui (Khanzada) Raja & Taluqdar of Mahmudabad Awadh
- Noble house
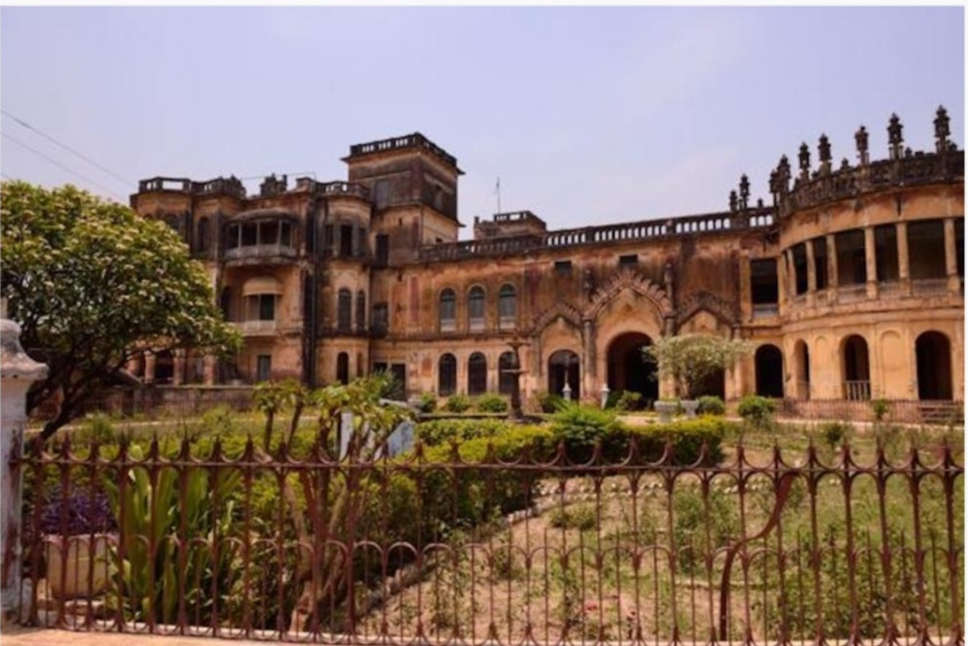
- Country: Kingdom of Oudh, British India, India
- Founded: 1360
- Founder: Sheikh Nathu; Was rewarded large estates in Fatehpur by King of Delhi
- Current head: Mohammad Amir Mohammad Khan
- Final ruler: Mohammad Amir Ahmad Khan
- Titles: Nawab, Raja, Khan Bahadur, Amirul Omara, Saeedul Mulk, Muzzafar Jung, Ghanzanfaru-daula, Sir
- Estate: Mahmudabad Estate
- Dissolution: 1952
- Website: www.mahmudabad.in

Mahmudabad Estate or Mahmoodabad Estate, governed from Mahmudabad, was one of the largest feudal estates in the erstwhile Kingdom of Oudh. The rulers were generally referred to as Raja of Mahmudabad or Raja of Mahmoodabad.

== History ==
The Mahmudabad Estate was founded in 1677 by Raja Mahmud Khan. The last ruler might also have an interaction with famous writer Saadat Hassan Manto, as mentioned in famous book Dozakhnama-chapter 38 (writer Rabisankar Bal)

Bilehra Palace was built in Indo-European Regency-style architecture as royal residence in Mahmudabad Estate. It was constructed between 1835 and 1865. However, after the death of the last Raja, Abul Hasan Khan, in 1918, during the Spanish flu pandemic, it fell into disrepair.
