= Mohammad Amir Ahmed Khan =

Pakistani politician, writer, scholar (1914–1973)

Raja Sahib Mahmudabad
- راجہ صاحب محمود آباد
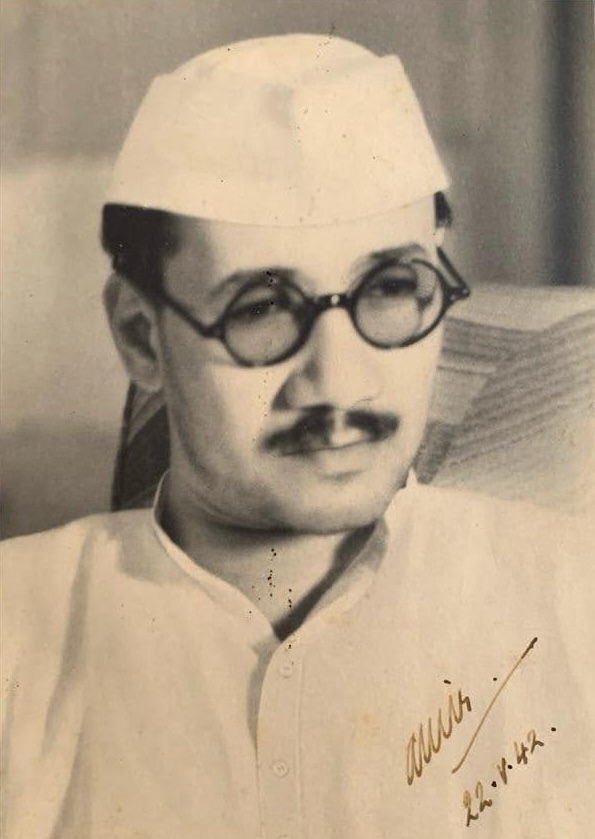
- Born: Mohammad Amir Ahmed Khan (محمد عامر احمد خان); 5 November 1914; United Provinces of Agra and Oudh, British India
- Died: 14 October 1973 (aged 58); London, England
- Resting place: Imam Reza shrine, Mashhad, Iran
- Education: La Martiniere Lucknow
- Occupations: Politician; writer; scholar
- Spouse: Rani Kaniz Abid
- Father: Maharaja Mohammad Ali Mohammad Khan
- Relatives: Ali Khan Mahmudabad (grandson)

Mohammad Amir Ahmad Khan (Urdu: محمد عامر احمد خان), titled the Raja of Mahmudabad (راجہ صاحب محمود آباد) (5 November 1914 – 14 October 1973), was a prominent nobleman and member of the Pakistan Movement.

The Raja of Mahmudabad was initially opposed to the partition of India and came to serve as the president of the All-India Jamhur Muslim League, which worked to oppose the idea of a possible partition on religious grounds. He came to accept the idea of a separate state for Indian Muslims and became a leader of the All India Muslim League, which heralded the Pakistan Movement.

He served as Managing Trustee from 1940–1944 of Madrasatul Waizeen, a centre of Shia Islamic education founded by his father located in Lucknow.

== Literary and cultural aspects ==
He carried on the family tradition and was an accomplished poet in Urdu and Persian. He composed a number of ruba'iyat, salaams, and marsiya as well as some ghazals and nazms under the takhalus (nom de plume) of 'Bahr' and 'Mahbub'. One of his previously unpublished marsiya, entitled Jawn Martyr of Karbala Lamented, has been recently published in London.

== Inheritance and legacy ==
He inherited the Estate of Mahamudabad in 1931 upon death of his father Maharaja Sir Mohammad Ali Mohammad Khan. After his demise, his estate - including the Metropole Hotel in Nainital - was taken over by the Government of India under 'Enemy Properties Act'. His wife, Rani Kaniz Abid, and his only son and heir Raja Mohammad Amir Mohammad Khan remained an Indian citizen and fought a case for recovery of their ancestral estate for reclaiming their heritage worth millions of rupees and the case is, at present, in high profile legal dispute in India. He won the case after 37 herculean years winning through district court, High Court of Bombay, and the Supreme Court of India which gave a landmark judgement in 2005 ordering "vacant possession" to his properties. Yet to date, the order is far from implementation as the Indian Government continues to bring emergency ordinances in order to block the Supreme Court order; so the case is back in the courts.

== Political activity ==
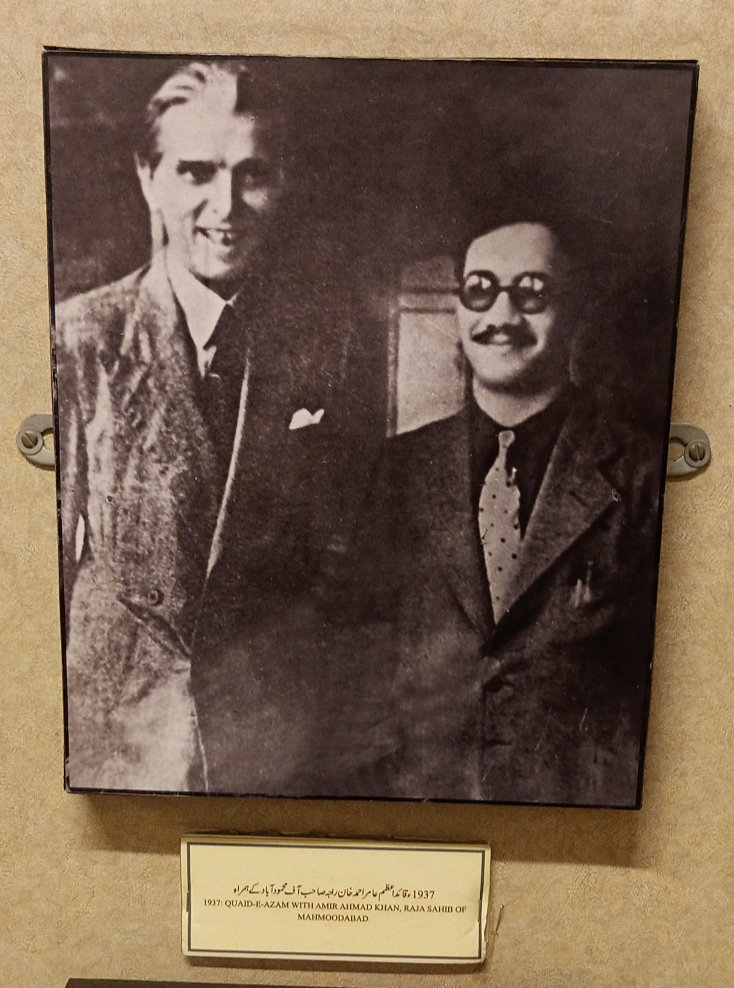
The picture of Raja of Mahmudabad, Mohammad Amir Ahmad Khan with Muslim League leader, Muhammad Ali Jinnah (1937), is inscribed in the museum collection of the Lahore Museum.

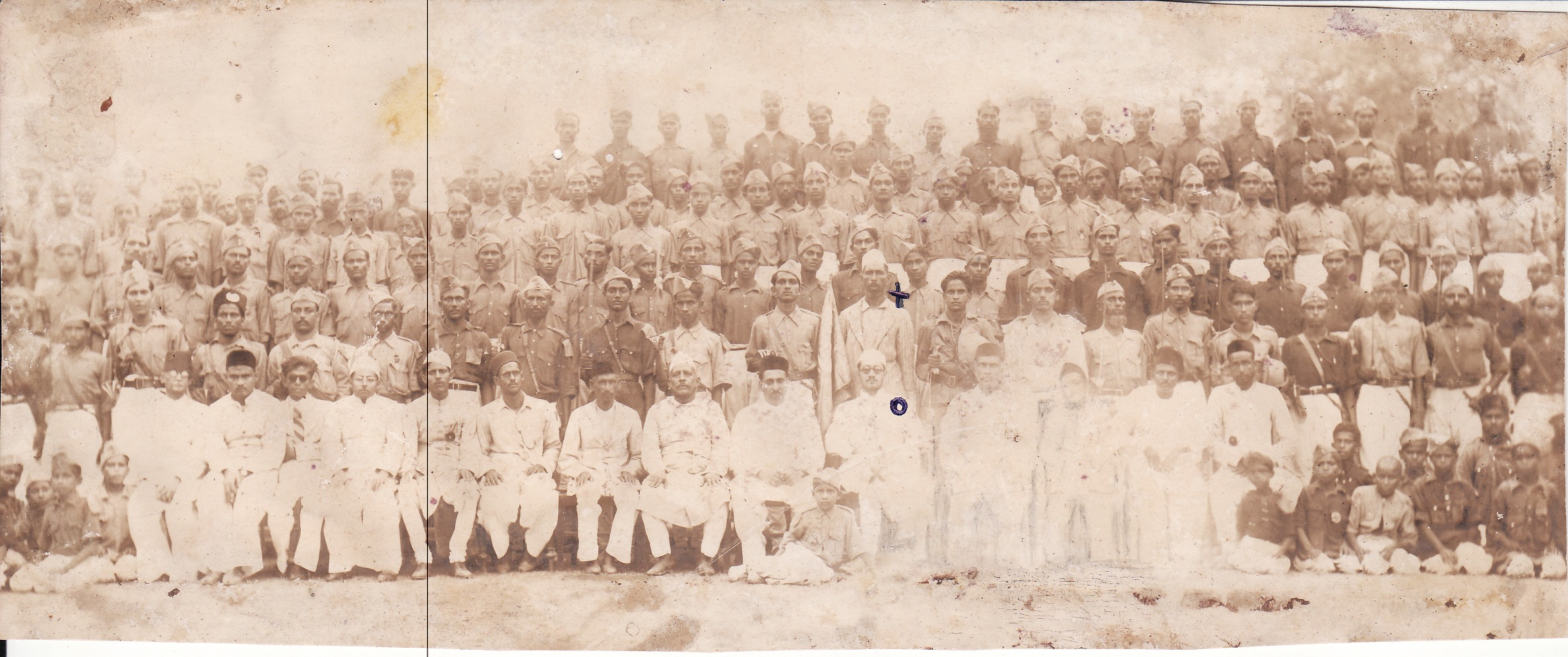
Mohammad Amir Ahmed Khan served as the president of the All India Jamhur Muslim League (1940)

He was one of the youngest members of Working Committee of All India Muslim League in 1937. In the same year 1937, he founded All India Muslim Students Federation. He was initially against the partition of India and came to serve as the president of the All-India Jamhur Muslim League, which worked to oppose the idea of a partition of India.

However, when the Muslim League passed the Lahore Resolution in 1940, he started supporting the creation of Pakistan and after that time, the All India Muslim Students Federation mobilized to vocally support the Pakistan Movement. He changed his mind under the influence of Muhammad Ali Jinnah, who was a long time family friend, and Raja Sahib eventually supported the idea of a separate state for the Muslims of colonial India. Maharaja Mohammad Ali Mohammad Khan had created a trust with Motilal Nehru, Mohammad Ali Jinnah, Deputy Habibullah and Chaudhary Bam Bahadur Shah amongst others to administer the estate as his son was still a minor. Motilal Nehru died before the Maharaja and after the latter's death in 1931, Mohammad Ali Jinnah became the dominant personality on the board. He said that "...the idea of a separate Muslim state in India stirred the imagination of the Muslims as nothing else had done before."

Jinnah appointed him the President of All India Muslim Students Federation which later played a critical role for winning the referendum in North-West Frontier Province and some other general elections in British India. He also financially supported the leading promoter of All India Muslim League's ideology, the Dawn newspaper.

"The vision of Raja Sahib about Pakistan was an Islamic welfare state to be established on the philosophy and teachings of Islam. But he was disheartened when he found that a few corrupt political leaders, landlords and bureaucrats put Pakistan on a wrong track in order to seek their personal interests".

== Migration ==
In 1945, before the partition, he migrated to Iraq. He subsequently moved to Pakistan in 1957. Later yet, he settled down in London. Before moving to London, he donated all the future income from his inherited lands to the state of Pakistan.

== Life in London ==
He was the first Director of the Islamic Cultural Centre in London, and devoted rest of his life in supervising the building of the Regent Park Mosque. He was the moving force behind the World of Islam Festival held in 1976 in the United Kingdom. Ali Allawi reminisces about the events of 1976.

== Death ==
He died in London on 14 October 1973, but was buried in Mashhad in Iran near the Imam Reza shrine. He is survived by his two daughters, Bari Rajkumari Ammatul Hussein Imam and Choti Rajkumari Rabab Mehdi, and was succeeded by his son Raja Mohammad Amir Mohammad Khan who has been a Member of the Legislative Assembly of Uttar Pradesh.

== Legacy ==
The Mahmudabad area of Karachi is named after him. Raja Sahib of Mahmudabad used to practice strict self-denial and self-discipline for religious reasons in his personal life. That is why his house in Karbala, Iraq and all his wealth was gifted to the Government of Pakistan.

In 1990, Pakistan Postal Services issued a commemorative postage stamp in his honor in its 'Pioneers of Freedom' series.
