= Mahmudabad, India =

Mahmudabad
- Town
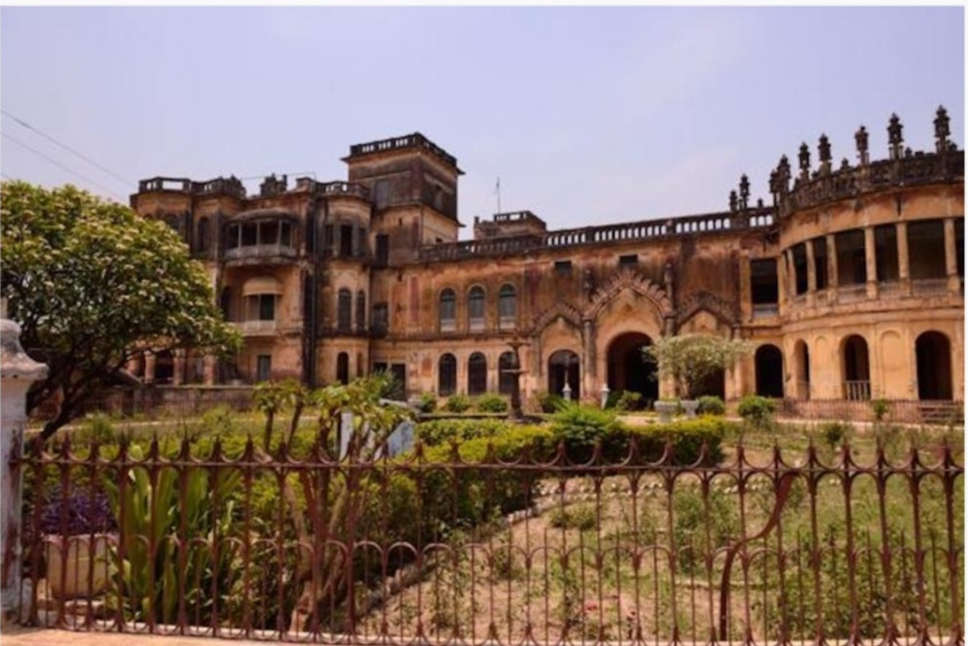
- Mahmudabad Fort
- Nickname: Mahmoodabad
- Location in Uttar Pradesh, United States Mahmudabad (India)
- Coordinates: 27.3°N 81.12°E
- Country: India
- State: Uttar Pradesh
- District: Sitapur
- Established: 1762
- Founder: Mahmood Khan

Government
  - MLA: Smt. Asha Maurya

Population (2011)
  - Total: 50,777

Languages
  - Official: Hindi, Urdu
- Time zone: UTC+5:30 (IST)
- PIN: 261203
- Vehicle registration: UP-34
- Sex ratio: 50/50 ♂/♀
- Website: up.gov.in mahmudabad.in

Mahmudabad, (or Mahmoodabad) also known as Mahmudabad Awadh is a town and a municipal board in Sitapur district in the Indian state of Uttar Pradesh.

Mahmudabad tehsil town is the main town in the mandal which has about 66 villages around, while the main city in the district is Sitapur which is about 70 km away and State Headquarter Lucknow is 52 km away. Mahmudabad is approachable by road from all the cities and towns of Uttar Pradesh, while Lucknow Airport situated about 60 km away is the nearest airport. Mahmudabad having a railway station, besides Munda Gopal Ash, Sidhauli and Ataria Railway stations are the nearest rail stations which are around 3 to 32 km distance, and some trains heading to Bihar from Delhi stop at these stations.

== History ==
Mahmudabad Estate was one of the largest feudal estates in the erstwhile kingdom of Awadh. Mahmudabad is the part of Oudh State (अवध रियासत) during British India. Its Raja Mohammad Amir Ahmad Khan, during the freedom struggle, had been an important member of the Muslim League and a close friend of Jinnah. In 1962, he migrated to Pakistan, leaving his young son and heir behind in Lucknow. The vast Mahmudabad properties in UP were then seized as "enemy property" under defence rules. When the old raja died in London in 1974, his son Raja Mohammad Amir Khan began a long legal battle to get back his inheritance. In a landmark judgement in Sep 2005, the Supreme Court of India directed the Government of India to release the Mahmudabad properties and restore them to the present raja. But with the issuance of a new ordinance on enemy property in 2016, his properties in Uttar Pradesh, Uttarakhand, Maharashtra and Delhi again came under the control of the Government of India.

The novel “The Vanishing Indian Upper Class:Life History of Reza Mohammed Khan” was written by Raja Mohammad Amir Khan’s cousin Rajkumar Mohammad Amir Kazim Khan. A critique on how the upper class of India has transformed since independence of India (4).

== Demographics ==
Religions in Mahmudabad
Religion	Percent
Hindus	41.58%
Muslims	57.02%
Jains	1.02%
Others†	0.21%
Distribution of religions †Includes Sikhs (0.1%), Buddhists (<0.2%).

As of the 2001 Census of India, Mahmudabad had a population of 41,911. Males constitute 53% of the population and females 47%. Mahmudabad has an average literacy rate of 49%, lower than the national average of 59.5%: male literacy is 54%, and female literacy is 43%. In Mahmudabad, 17% of the population is under 6 years of age.

== Educational Institutes ==
- Sardar Vallabh Bhai Patel Kanya Siksha Sansthan
- Prakash Vidya Mandir Inter College
- BabuRam Savitri Devi Inter College Shekhpur
- United Avadh Inter College
- Adarsh Bal Vidya Mandir
- Seth M.R. Jaipuria School, Mahmudabad Campus
- Sardar Singh Convent Inter College
- Sita Inter College
- Maulana Azad Institute of Humanities Science and Technology
- Jawahar Lal Nehru Polytechnic
- Moulana Azad Law College
- Seth Ram Gulam Inter and Degree College
- Don Bosco High School
- Calvin College Inter college
- FAA Government Degree College Mahmudabad
- I T I College
- Mahmoodabad Law College
- Mahmoodabad College of Management & Technology
- Indian Institute of Computer Education
- Universal Computer Education Centre
- Krishna Institute of Computer Education
