= Moradabad Lok Sabha constituency =

Lok Sabha constituency in Uttar Pradesh, India

Coordinates: 28.83°N 78.76°E

Moradabad UP-6
- Lok Sabha constituency
- Interactive Map Outlining Moradabad Lok Sabha constituency

Constituency details
- Country: India
- Region: North India
- State: Uttar Pradesh
- Assembly constituencies: Barhapur; Kanth; Thakurdwara; Moradabad Rural; Moradabad Nagar
- Established: 1952
- Total electors: 20,59,686
- Reservation: None

Member of Parliament
- 18th Lok Sabha
- Incumbent Ruchi Vira
- Party: Samajwadi Party
- Alliance: INDIA
- Elected year: 2024
- Preceded by: S. T. Hasan

Moradabad Lok Sabha constituency (constituency number 6; Hindi pronunciation: [mʊɾaːd̪aːbaːd̪]) is one of the 80 Lok Sabha (parliamentary) constituencies in western Uttar Pradesh state in northern India. It is located in the northern part of the state at a distance of 167 km from the national capital, New Delhi. Formed before the 1952 elections, it represents Moradabad district in the lower house of Indian Parliament.

According to Election Commission of India's 2024 data, the number of total electorates in the constituency is 2,056,539, of which 1,092,002 are males, 964,425 are females, and 87 are transgender people. This results in a gender ratio of 883 women per 1,000 men. There are 2,133 polling booths in the constituency, and its administrative headquarter is situated in the city of Moradabad. Hindi is the official language of Moradabad, though Urdu, Punjabi, and English are also widely spoken and understood.

== Assembly segments ==
At present, after the implementation of the Presidential notification on delimitation on 19 February 2008, Moradabad Lok Sabha constituency comprises five Vidhan Sabha (legislative assembly) segments. Kanth and Thakurdwara assembly segments before 2008 were in erstwhile Amroha and Rampur Lok Sabha constituencies respectively. These are:

No	Name	District	Member	Party	2024 lead
19	Barhapur	Bijnor	Kunwar Sushant Singh	BJP	SP
25	Kanth	Moradabad	Kamal Akhtar	SP	SP
26	Thakurdwara	Moradabad	Nawab Jan	SP	SP
27	Moradabad Rural	Moradabad	Mohammed Nasir	SP	SP
28	Moradabad Nagar	Moradabad	Ritesh Kumar Gupta	BJP	SP

== List of Members of Parliament ==
Year	Member	Party
1952	Ram Saran	Indian National Congress
1957	Ram Saran	Indian National Congress
1962	Syed Muzaffar Hussain	Independent
1967	Om Prakash Tyagi	Bharatiya Jana Sangh
1971	Virendra Agarwal	Bharatiya Jana Sangh
1977	Ghulam Mohammad Khan	Janata Party
1980	Ghulam Mohammad Khan	Janata Party (Secular)
1984	Hafiz Mohd. Siddiq	Indian National Congress
1989	Ghulam Mohammad Khan	Janata Dal
1991	Ghulam Mohammad Khan	Janata Dal
1996	Shafiqur Rahman Barq	Samajwadi Party
1998	Shafiqur Rahman Barq	Samajwadi Party
1999	Chandra Vijay Singh	Akhil Bharatiya Loktantrik Congress
2004	Shafiqur Rahman Barq	Samajwadi Party
2009	Mohammad Azharuddin	Indian National Congress
2014	Kunwar Sarvesh Kumar Singh	Bharatiya Janata Party
2019	S. T. Hasan	Samajwadi Party
2024	Ruchi Vira	Samajwadi Party

== Election results ==
Vote share of Winning candidates
2024	49.76%
2019	50.65%
2014	43.01%
2009	39.59%
2004	33.28%
1999	39.65%
1998	39.52%
1996	38.06%
1991	41.06%
1989	50.64%
1984	29.41%
1980	33.95%
1977	64.77%
1971	34.92%
1967	30.40%
1962	29.24%
1957	36.67%
1951	47.58%

=== 2024 ===
2024 Indian general election: Moradabad
Party	Candidate	Votes	%	±%
SP	Ruchi Vira	637,363	49.67	▼0.98
BJP	Kunwar Sarvesh Kumar Singh	531,601	41.43	▼1.58
BSP	Irfan Saifi	92,313	7.19	▲7.19
NOTA	None of the above	5,824	0.45	Steady
Majority		1,05,762	8.24	▲0.60
Turnout		1,283,185	62.30	▼3.16
SP hold		Swing	▲0.98	

=== 2019 ===
2019 Indian general elections: Moradabad
Party	Candidate	Votes	%	±%
SP	S. T. Hasan	649,416	50.65	▲15.39
BJP	Kunwar Sarvesh Kumar Singh	551,538	43.01	Steady
INC	Imran Pratapgarhi	59,198	4.62	▲2.87
NOTA	None of the above	5,757	0.45	▼0.01
Majority		98,122	7.64	▼0.11
Turnout		12,82,206	65.45	▲1.79
SP gain from BJP		Swing		

=== 2014 ===
2014 Indian general elections: Moradabad
Party	Candidate	Votes	%	±%
BJP	Kunwar Sarvesh Kumar Singh	485,224	43.01	▲9.87
SP	S. T. Hasan	3,97,720	35.26	▲31.58
BSP	Haji Mohammad Yaqoob	1,60,945	14.27	▼5.13
PECP	Engineer Mohammad Irfan	25,840	2.29	▲2.29
INC	Begum Noor Bano	19,732	1.75	▼37.84
NOTA	None of the above	5,207	0.46	▲0.46
Majority		87,504	7.75	▲1.30
Turnout		11,27,965	63.66	▲8.86
BJP gain from INC		Swing	▲3.42	

=== 2009 ===
2009 Indian general election: Moradabad
Party	Candidate	Votes	%	±%
INC	Mohammad Azharuddin	301,283	39.59	▲39.59
BJP	Kunwar Sarvesh Kumar Singh	2,52,176	33.14	▲5.33
BSP	Rajiv Channa	1,47,594	19.40	▼3.59
SP	Mohammad Rizwan	27,982	3.68	▼29.60
IND.	Hariom Balmiki	5,675	0.75	▲0.75
Majority		49,107	6.45	▲0.98
Turnout		7,60,944	54.80	▲6.39
INC gain from SP		Swing	▲6.31	

=== 2004 ===
2004 Indian general election: Moradabad
Party	Candidate	Votes	%	±%
SP	Shafiqur Rahman Barq	218,079	33.28	▲8.78
BJP	Chandra Vijay Singh	1,82,239	27.81	N/A
BSP	Iftakar Mohammad Khan	1,50,616	22.98	▲3.66
NLP	Dr. Masood Ahmad	42,018	6.41	▲3.17
IND	Parmeshwar Lal	38,170	5.82	N/A
Majority		35,840	5.47	▼9.59
Turnout		6,55,175	48.41	▼7.64
SP gain from ABLTC		Swing	▼6.28	

=== 1999 ===
1999 Indian general election: Moradabad
Party	Candidate	Votes	%	±%
ABLTC	Chandra Vijay Singh	253,321	39.56	N/A
SP	Shafiqur Rahman Barq	1,56,871	24.50	▼15.02
BSP	Mohammad Akhil	1,23,714	19.32	▲0.74
INC	Reena Kumari	63762	9.96	▲5.11
NLP	Zahid Husain	20729	3.24	N/A
IND	Sudhir Kumar Singh	12,391	1.94	N/A
Majority		96,450	15.06	▲10.08
Turnout		6,47,988	56.05	▼8.45
ABLTC gain from SP		Swing	▲0.04	

=== 1998 ===
1998 Indian general election: Moradabad
Party	Candidate	Votes	%	±%
SP	Shafiqur Rahman Barq	289,484	39.52	▲1.46
BJP	Vijay Bansal	2,53,003	34.54	▼3.23
BSP	Raja Ram Saini	1,36,081	18.58	▲0.93
INC	Hafiz Moh. Siddiqi	63762	4.85	▲1.76
RJD	Wajid Hussain	10,132	1.38	N/A
IND	Mobin	2,075	0.28	N/A
Majority		36,481	4.98	▲4.69
Turnout		7,38,542	64.50	▲7.12
SP hold		Swing	▲1.46	

=== 1996 ===
1996 Indian general election: Moradabad
Party	Candidate	Votes	%	±%
SP	Shafiqur Rahman Barq	242,030	38.06	N/A
BJP	Sandeep Singh	2,40,145	37.77	▼0.44
BSP	Akbar Husain	1,12,254	17.65	N/A
INC	Indra Mohini	19,643	3.09	▼6.56
IND	Haji Kamruddin	3,380	0.53	N/A
Majority		1,885	0.29	▼2.56
Turnout		6,44,081	57.38	▲4.26
SP gain from JD		Swing	▼3.00	

=== 1991 ===
1991 Indian general election: Moradabad
Party	Candidate	Votes	%	±%
JD	Ghulam Mohammad Khan	201,739	41.06	▼9.58
BJP	V.P. Singhal	1,87,761	38.21	▲35.84
INC	Onkar Saran Kothiwal	47,408	9.65	▼24.11
JP	Shamim Ahmed Khan	25,933	5.28	N/A
IND	Jiraj Singh	9,193	1.87	N/A
Majority		13,978	2.85	▼14.03
Turnout		5,07,415	53.12	▼0.01
JD hold		Swing	▼9.58	

=== 1989 ===
1989 Indian general election: Moradabad
Party	Candidate	Votes	%	±%
JD	Ghulam Mohammad Khan	245,760	50.64	N/A
INC	Indra Mohini	1,63,843	33.76	▲4.35
IND	Dinesh Tyagi	30,086	6.20	N/A
BSP	Ram Chandra Seni	19.135	3.94	N/A
BJP	Laxman Prasad	11,489	2.37	▼18.61
Majority		81,917	16.88	▲15.09
Turnout		5,04,312	53.13	▼7.44
JD gain from INC		Swing	▲21.23	

=== 1984 ===
1984 Indian general election: Moradabad
Party	Candidate	Votes	%	±%
INC	Hafiz Siddiq	116,942	29.41	▼1.10
INLD	Ghulam Mohammad Khan	1,09,829	27.62	N/A
BJP	Dinesh Chandra	83,440	20.98	N/A
IND	Chandra Vijay Singh	44,410	11.17	N/A
IND	Mahendra Singh Yadav	30,819	7.75	N/A
Majority		7,113	1.79	▼1.65
Turnout		4,05,931	60.57	▲10.89
INC gain from JP(S)		Swing	▼4.54	

=== 1980 ===
1980 Indian general election: Moradabad
Party	Candidate	Votes	%	±%
JP(S)	Ghulam Mohammad Khan	103,291	33.95	N/A
INC(I)	Naubat Ram	92,824	30.51	▲11.47
JP	Basir Ahmad	59,747	19.64	N/A
INC(U)	Humuan Qadir	24,050	7.90	N/A
IND	Santosh Kumar	5,032	1.65	N/A
Majority		10,467	3.44	▼42.29
Turnout		3,10,575	49.68	▼6.33
JP(S) gain from JP		Swing	▼30.82	

=== 1977 ===
1977 Indian general election: Moradabad
Party	Candidate	Votes	%	±%
BLD	Ghulam Mohammad Khan	196,648	64.77	
INC	D.N.Sinha	57,797	19.04	
IND	Karan Singh	19,267	6.35	
IND	Riasat Hussain	12,981	4.28	
IND	Shamim Ahmad Khan	4,340	1.43	
IND	Krishan Kant Gupta	3,120	1.03	
Majority		138,851	45.73	▲36.72
Turnout		3,09,125	56.01	▲9.37
JP gain from ABJS		Swing	▲29.85	

=== 1971 ===
1971 Indian general election: Moradabad
Party	Candidate	Votes	%	±%
ABJS	Virendra Agrawal	83,077	34.92	▲4.52
IND	Shamim Ahmad Khan	61,649	25.91	N/A
IND	D.N.Sinha	25,731	10.81	N/A
BKD	Khamani Singh	18,392	7.73	N/A
Majority		21,428	9.01	▼1.57
Turnout		2,44,812	46.64	▼12.71
ABJS hold		Swing	▲4.52	

=== 1967 ===
1967 Indian general election: Moradabad
Party	Candidate	Votes	%	±%
ABJS	Om Prakash Tyagi	78,497	30.40	▲6.25
INC	M.S. Fakhri	51,192	19.82	▼3.8
SWA	M. Husain	42,473	16.45	N/A
IND	K.Singh	28,203	10.92	N/A
Majority		27,305	10.58	▲5.49
Turnout		2,77,516	59.35	▼1,68
ABJS gain from Independent		Swing	▲1.16	

=== 1962 ===
1962 Indian general election: Moradabad
Party	Candidate	Votes	%	±%
RSP	Syed Muzaffar Hussain	69,171	29.24	N/A
ABJS	Brij Bhushan Saran Bansal	57,138	24.15	▲7.74
INC	Ram Saran	55,874	23.62	▼13.05
Majority		12,033	5.09	▲2.02
Turnout		2,50.736	61.03	▲10.78
RSP gain from INC		Swing	▼7.43	

=== 1957 ===
1957 Indian general election: Moradabad
Party	Candidate	Votes	%	±%
INC	Ram Saran	75,992	36.67	▼10.91
IND	Khaliq Ahmad	69,636	33.60	N/A
ABJS	Brahma Swarup	34,001	16.41	▲2.33
PSP	Ram Saran	27,615	13.32	N/A
Majority		6,356	3.07	▼18.02
Turnout		2,07,244	50.25	▲7.60
INC hold		Swing	▼10.91	

=== 1951 ===
1951 Indian general election: Moradabad
Party	Candidate	Votes	%	±%
INC	Ram Saran	74,644	47.58	
Socialist	Om Prakash	41,552	26.49	
ABJS	Kishan Chand	22,088	14.08	
KMPP	Shanker Datt Sharma	18,587	11.85	
Majority		33,092	21.09	
Turnout		1,56,871	42.65	
INC win (new seat)				

== See also ==
- Moradabad district
- List of constituencies of the Lok Sabha
- Moradabad (Mayoral Constituency)
