= Thakurdwara Assembly constituency =

Constituency of the Uttar Pradesh legislative assembly in India

Coordinates: 29.19°N 78.86°E

Thakurdwara
- Constituency No. 26 for the Uttar Pradesh Legislative Assembly

Constituency details
- Country: India
- Region: North India
- State: Uttar Pradesh
- District: Moradabad
- Lok Sabha constituency: Moradabad
- Total electors: 372,490
- Reservation: None

Member of Legislative Assembly
- 18th Uttar Pradesh Legislative Assembly
- Incumbent Nawab Jan
- Party: Samajwadi Party
- Elected year: 2022

Thakurdwara is one of the 403 Legislative Assembly constituencies of Uttar Pradesh state in India.

It is part of Moradabad district.

== Members of Legislative Assembly ==
Year	Member	Party
1952	Shiv Sarup Singh	Indian National Congress
1957	Kishan Singh	Indian National Congress
1962	Ram Pal Singh	Indian National Congress
1967	Ahmad Ullah Khan	Swatantra Party
1969	Ahmad Ullah Khan	Swatantra Party
1974	Ram Pal Singh	Indian National Congress
1977	Mukeemur Rehman	Janata Party
1980	Ram Pal Singh	Indian National Congress (I)
1985	Sakhawat Hussain	Indian National Congress (J)
1989	Mohmadullah Khan	Bahujan Samaj Party
1991	Kunwar Sarvesh Singh	Bharatiya Janata Party
1993	Kunwar Sarvesh Singh	Bharatiya Janata Party
1996	Kunwar Sarvesh Singh	Bharatiya Janata Party
2002	Kunwar Sarvesh Singh	Bharatiya Janata Party
2007	Vijay Kumar Yadav	Bahujan Samaj Party
2012	Kunwar Sarvesh Singh	Bharatiya Janata Party
2014^	Nawab Jan	Samajwadi Party
2017	Nawab Jan	Samajwadi Party
2022	Nawab Jan	Samajwadi Party

== Election results ==
=== 2027 ===
2027 Uttar Pradesh Legislative Assembly election: Thakurdwara
Party	Candidate	Votes	%	±%
INDIA				
NDA				
BSP				
NOTA	None of the above			
Majority				
Turnout				
gain from		Swing		

=== 2022 ===
2022 Uttar Pradesh Legislative Assembly election: Thakurdwara
Party	Candidate	Votes	%	±%
SP	Nawab Jan	134,391	48.76	+6.69
BJP	Ajay Pratap Singh	114,707	41.62	+4.78
BSP	Mujahid Ali	22,163	8.04	−7.49
NOTA	None of the above	1,061	0.38	−0.03
Majority		19,684	7.14	+1.91
Turnout		275,608	73.99	+0.25
SP hold		Swing		

=== 2017 ===
2017 Uttar Pradesh Legislative Assembly election: Thakurdwara
Party	Candidate	Votes	%	±%
SP	Nawab Jan	107,865	42.07	
BJP	Rajpal Singh Chauhan	94,456	36.84	
BSP	Vijay Yadav	39,821	15.53	
AIMIM	Ejaj Ahmed	9,444	3.68	
NOTA	None of the above	1,040	0.41	
Majority		13,409	5.23	
Turnout		256,420	73.74	
SP hold		Swing		

=== 2014 bypoll ===
Bye Election, 2014: Thakurdwara
Party	Candidate	Votes	%	±%
SP	Nawab Jan	111,097	47.82	
BJP	Rajpal Chauhan	84,074	36.19	
INC	Mohd. Ullah Khan	17,377	7.48	
MD	Ram Singh Chauhan Guru Ji	13,256	5.70	
LKD	Mohd.Aslam Urf Pasha	765	0.32	
PECP	Rais Ahmad	475	0.20	
RPI(A)	Roopchand Singh	709	0.30	
Independent	Mahipal Singh	2,449	1.05	
Independent	Udees Kumar	219	0.09	
Independent	Mo.Jakir	531	0.22	
Independent	Anurag Kumar	241	0.10	
NOTA	NOTA	1,115	0.47	
Majority		27,023	11.63	
Turnout		232,308	70.51	
SP gain from BJP		Swing		

=== 2012 ===
2012 Uttar Pradesh Legislative Assembly election: Thakurdwara
Party	Candidate	Votes	%	±%
BJP	Kunwar Sarvesh Kumar	84,530	38.39	
MD	Vijay Yadav	46,556	21.14	
INC	Nawab Jan	46,519	21.12	
BSP	Haji Mohd Ilyas	26,367	11.97	
SP	Manmohan Singh Saini	5,633	2.56	
NOTA	NOTA			
Majority				
Turnout				
BJP gain from BSP		Swing		

=== 2007 ===
2007 Uttar Pradesh Legislative Assembly election: Thakurdwara
Party	Candidate	Votes	%	±%
BSP	Vijay Yadav	62,394	37.02	
BJP	Kunwar Sarvesh Kumar	53,284	31.62	
INC	Mohdullah Khan	39,067	23.18	
SP	Javed Ali Khan	4,994	2.96	
NOTA	NOTA			
Majority				
Turnout				
BSP gain from BJP		Swing		

=== 2002 ===
2002 Uttar Pradesh Legislative Assembly election: Thakurdwara
Party	Candidate	Votes	%	±%
BJP	Kunwar Sarvesh Kumar	87,318	45.74	
INC	Mohdullah Khan	84,063	44.04	
BSP	Hafiz Hussain Ansari	8,169	4.28	
SP	Vijay Yadav	6,281	3.29	
NOTA	NOTA			
Majority			1.70	
Turnout				
BJP hold		Swing		

== See also ==
- List of constituencies of the Uttar Pradesh Legislative Assembly
- Moradabad district
- Sahaspur
