= Ikram Qureshi =

Indian politician

Member (MLA) of Uttar Pradesh Legislative Assembly
- In office March 2017 – March 2022
- Preceded by: Shameemul Haq
- Succeeded by: Mohd Nasir Qureshi
- Constituency: Moradabad Rural

Personal details
- Born: 10 October 1958 (age 67) Moradabad, Uttar Pradesh
- Party: Indian National Congress
- Spouse: Tanveer Bano (m. 1979)
- Children: 4
- Parent: Hazi Abdul Rashid
- Education: High School
- Occupation: Agriculturist
- Profession: Industry

Haji Ikram Qureshi is an Indian politician from the state of Uttar Pradesh. He is a member of 17th Legislative Assembly of Uttar Pradesh representing the Moradabad constituency on a Samajwadi Party ticket. He is also the district president of the party.

== Political career ==
In 2012, Qureshi was made the chairman of the "Essential commodities corporation". After being elevated to the post, he celebrated by leading a procession. There it was found, that his supporters were throwing money in air. However, the Bulandshahr police said that they were unaware of such procession. In January 2017, he was made the Moradabad district president of Samajwadi Party, succeeding Athar Ali Ansari.

Though Qureshi's name did not feature in the list of candidates for the 2017 Uttar Pradesh Assembly election by Mulayam Singh Yadav, his son Akhilesh Yadav included him in his list. He was made a candidate for Moradabad Rural (succeeding sitting MLA Shameemul Haq) as he fitted Samajwadi Party's strategy of caste equation. He was also made a candidate for supporting Akhilesh Yadav in his family feud. In the 2017 Uttar Pradesh Assembly election, Qureshi emerged victorious by defeating his nearest rival, a Bahujan Samaj Party candidate by around 28 thousand votes. Qureshi polled 98 thousand votes compared to BSP's candidate Pannalal who won 69 thousand votes.

== Controversy ==
In April 2017, a Muslim girl, Shazia alleged that Qureshi's men had assaulted her and her family. She also claimed that the police refused to lodge a complaint as they were asked by Qureshi not to do so. So she went to chief minister Yogi Adityanath to lodge a complaint.
