= Imran Pratapgarhi =

Indian Urdu poet and politician

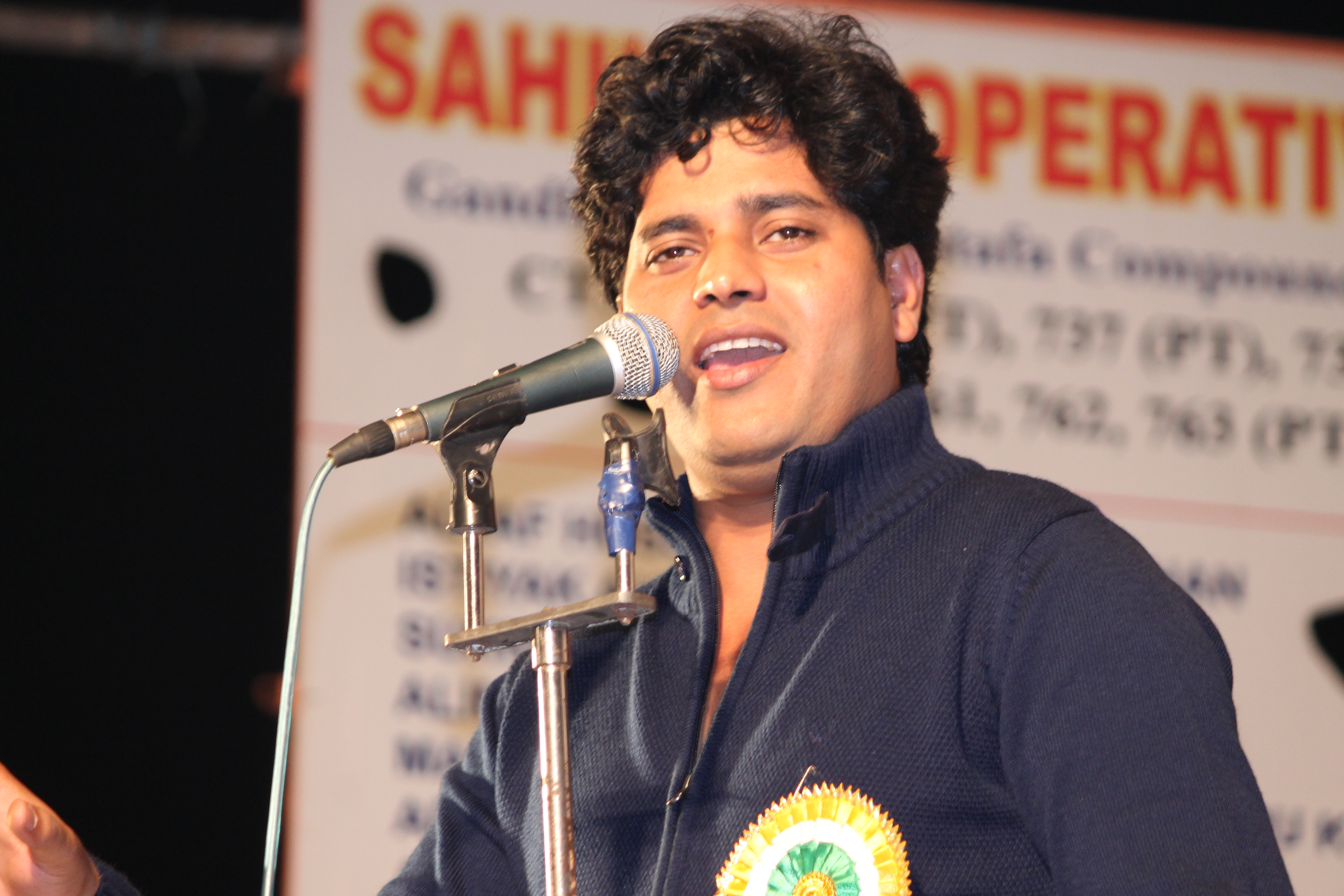

Chairman of Minority Department All India Congress Committee
- Incumbent
- Assumed office 3 June 2021
- AICC President: Mallikarjun Kharge
- Preceded by: Nadeem Javed

Member of Parliament, Rajya Sabha
- Incumbent
- Assumed office 5 July 2022
- Preceded by: P. Chidambaram
- Constituency: Maharashtra

Personal details
- Born: Mohammed Imran Khan; 6 August 1987 (age 39) Pratapgarh, Uttar Pradesh, India
- Citizenship: India
- Party: Indian National Congress
- Parent: Mohammad Iliyas Khan(Father)
- Education: MA, In Hindi Literature Allahabad University
- Occupation: Poet, politician
- Awards: Yash Bharati Award; 2016

Imran Pratapgarhi (born 6 August 1987) is an Indian Urdu-language poet and politician, who is a Member of Parliament in the Rajya Sabha, the upper house of Indian Parliament. He represents the Indian state of Maharashtra. Pratapgarhi is known for his protest poetry that particularises the Muslim experience and identity in India and other parts of the world; he is especially known for his Urdu nazms "Madrasa" and "Han Main Kashmir Hoon."

Pratapgarhi was a losing candidate in the 2019 Indian general election as an Indian National Congress candidate from Moradabad Lok Sabha constituency. Pratapgarhi was appointed chairman of the Minority Department of the All India Congress Committee on 3 June 2021. He has been listed as one of the most influential Muslims of 2024 by Muslim Mirror.

== Early life and poetic career ==
Pratapgarhi was born as Mohammed Imran Khan to Mohammed Iliyas Khan in Pratapgarh, Uttar Pradesh. He completed his master's in Hindi literature from Allahabad University. At that time he wrote poetry in Hindi and participated in Kavi Sammelans (poetry symposiums). He started participating in Mushairas in 2008 and his Nazm Madrasa became popular. Apart from Madarsa, his other writings include Filisteen, Najeeb, and Umar out of over 100 Nazms written by him.

== Political career ==
A critic of Narendra Modi, Pratapgarhi joined the Indian National Congress and contested in 2019 Indian general election from Moradabad, where he lost to S. T. Hasan of Samajwadi Party with a margin of more than half a million votes (590,218 votes).

Pratapgarhi was appointed AICC minority department chairman on 3 June 2021.

In June 2022, Pratapgarhi was elected to the Rajya Sabha from Maharashtra on Indian National Congress nomination.

== Positions held ==
| 2022 | Elected to Rajya Sabha from Maharashtra

- Member, Standing Committee on Health and Family Welfare
- Member, Consultative Committee for the Ministry of Commerce and Industry

2024

- Member, Standing Committee on Transport, Tourism and Culture
- Member, Consultative Committee for the Ministry of Minority Affairs

== Awards ==
- Yash Bharti Award 2016 - highest Award of Uttar Pradesh Government.

== See also ==
- List of poets from Pratapgarh
