= Kunwar Sushant Singh =

Indian politician

Kunwar Sushant Singh MLA

Member of the Uttar Pradesh legislative assembly
- Incumbent
- Assumed office 11 March 2017
- Preceded by: Mohammad Ghazi
- Constituency: Barhapur

Personal details
- Born: 25 December 1988 (age 37) Ratupura, Uttar Pradesh, India
- Party: Bharatiya Janata Party
- Spouse: Smt. Sonal Singh
- Parent: Kunwar Sarvesh Kumar Singh
- Education: Welham Boys' School; St. Stephen's College, Delhi
- Occupation: Politician

Kunwar Sushant Singh is the Member of Legislative Assembly from Barhapur from Bharatiya Janata Party. He is a politician from Western Uttar Pradesh who belongs to Thakur (Rajput) caste. His father Kunwar Sarvesh Kumar Singh was former BJP MP from Moradabad and five term MLA from Thakurdwara. His grandfather Ram Pal Singh was former Congress MP from Amroha and three term MLA from Thakurdwara.

== Personal life ==
He was born on 25 December 1988 to Kunwar Sarvesh Kumar Singh, a five-term MLA from Thakurdwara and one-term MP from Moradabad. He is married to Kunwarani Sonal Singh. His grandfather Ram Pal Singh was three-term MLA from Thakurdwara and one-term MP from Amroha.

== Political career ==
He has been a member of the 18th Uttar Pradesh Assembly and was also 17th Legislative Assembly of Uttar Pradesh member. Since 2017 he has represented the Barhapur (Assembly constituency) and is a member of the Bharatiya Janata Party. He is fifth youngest MLA to be elected in Uttar Pradesh in 2017. He defeated Indian National Congress candidate Husain Ahmad by a margin of 9,824 votes. In 2022, BJP again announced his name as candidate of current legislative seat. He defeated Samajwadi Party candidate Kapil Kumar by a margin of 14,723 votes.

== Posts held ==
| # | From | To | Position | Comments |
|---|---|---|---|---|
| 01 | March 2017 | March 2022 | Member, 17th Legislative Assembly | |
| 02 | March 2022 | Incumbent | Member, 18th Legislative Assembly | |

== See also ==
- Manoj Kumar Singh
- Kunwar Bhartendra Singh
- Uttar Pradesh Legislative Assembly
