= Bilari (disambiguation) =

Bilari may refer to:

- Bilari, a town in Moradabad district, Uttar Pradesh, India
- Bilari (Assembly constituency), an assembly constituency in the town
- Bilari, Gorakhpur district, a village in Gorakhpur district
- Bilari, Iran, a village in Poshtkuh Rural District, Iran
