= Aneesurrehman =

Indian politician

Member of the Uttar Pradesh Legislative Assembly
- In office Mar 2012 – Mar 2017
- Preceded by: Rizwan Ahmad Khan
- Succeeded by: Rajesh Kumar Singh
- Constituency: Kanth

Personal details
- Born: 26 June 1963 (age 63) Moradabad district, Uttar Pradesh
- Citizenship: India
- Party: Samajwadi Party
- Spouse(s): 1.Late Mrs.Rihana Parveen, 2.Mrs.Sabiha
- Children: Ruhma Nishat, Faraz, Muslima, Dawood, Azmi, Uzma, Hamza
- Parent: Nazar Ali (father)
- Education: Aligarh Muslim University
- Profession: Agriculturist & Politician

Aneesurrehman is an Indian politician and a member of the 16th Legislative Assembly of Uttar Pradesh of India. He represented the Kanth constituency of Uttar Pradesh and is a member of the Peace Party of India.

== Early life and education ==
Aneesurrehman was born in Kasampur in Moradabad district, Uttar Pradesh. He holds B.Com and LLB degrees from Aligarh Muslim University. Before being elected as MLA, he used to work as an agriculturist.

== Political career ==
Aneesurrehman has been a MLA for one term and represented the Kanth constituency. He is a member of the Peace Party of India political party.

He lost his seat in the 2017 Uttar Pradesh Assembly election to Rajesh Kumar Singh of the Bharatiya Janata Party.

== Posts Held ==
#	From	To	Position	Comments
01	March 2012	March 2017	Member, 16th Legislative Assembly	

== See also ==
- Kanth
- Peace Party of India
- Politics of India
- Sixteenth Legislative Assembly of Uttar Pradesh
- Uttar Pradesh Legislative Assembly
