= Bhikanpur, Moradabad =

Village in Moradabad district of Uttar Pradesh

Coordinates: 28.9785°N 78.6361°E

Bhikanpur Asdalpur is situated on the Moradabad-Bijnor state highway in Moradabad district in Uttar Pradesh in India. It is the headquarters of the block administration and has a distribution unit of 37.5 KW under Uttar Pradesh Viduth Nigam Limited.

Google map of Village Bhikanpur, Moradabad.

Main Gate of Block Chhajlet (Bhikanpur) Anandi Dhaba in Village Bhikanpur, Moradabad.

== Bhikan Pur block ==
The block consists of 172 villages and 1 Nagar Palika-Kanth and 1 Nagar Panchayat-Ummeri Kalan. It spread in East Aghwanpur near by Moradabad, North Sahaspur in Bijnore district, West Ummeri Kalan and in South Kailsa kasba. It has two police stations named Chajlet and Kanth. There are two railway stations of the Northern Railway in Bhikan pur. One is named Kanth and the second is named Matlab Pur, just 1.5 km from Bhikan Pur Block headquarters. Bhikan pur mainly has a 70:30 ratio of Hindu and Muslims and it has no history of any communal violence.

== See also ==
- Khalilpur Amru, neighbouring village to south
