= Warhapur =

Town in Uttar Pradesh, India

Barhapur Barhapur
- Town
- Location in Uttar Pradesh, India Barhapur (India)
- Coordinates: 29°30′03″N 78°41′53″E
- Country: India
- State: Uttar Pradesh
- District: Bijnor

Population (2011)
  - Total: 23,456

Languages
  - Official: Hindi
- Time zone: UTC+5:30 (IST)
- Vehicle registration: UP20
- Website: up.gov.in

Barhapur is a town and a nagar panchayat in Bijnor district in the Indian state of Uttar, Pradesh.

Post and the legislative assembly constituency are also named Barhapur.

== Demographics ==
As of 2001 India census, Barhapur had a population of 20,863. Males constitute 52% of the population and females 48%. Barhapur has an average literacy rate of 38%, lower than the national average of 59.5%: male literacy is 44%, and female literacy is 31%. In Barhapur, 21% of the population is under 6 years of age.
