= Kunwar Sarvesh Kumar Singh =

Indian politician (1952–2024)

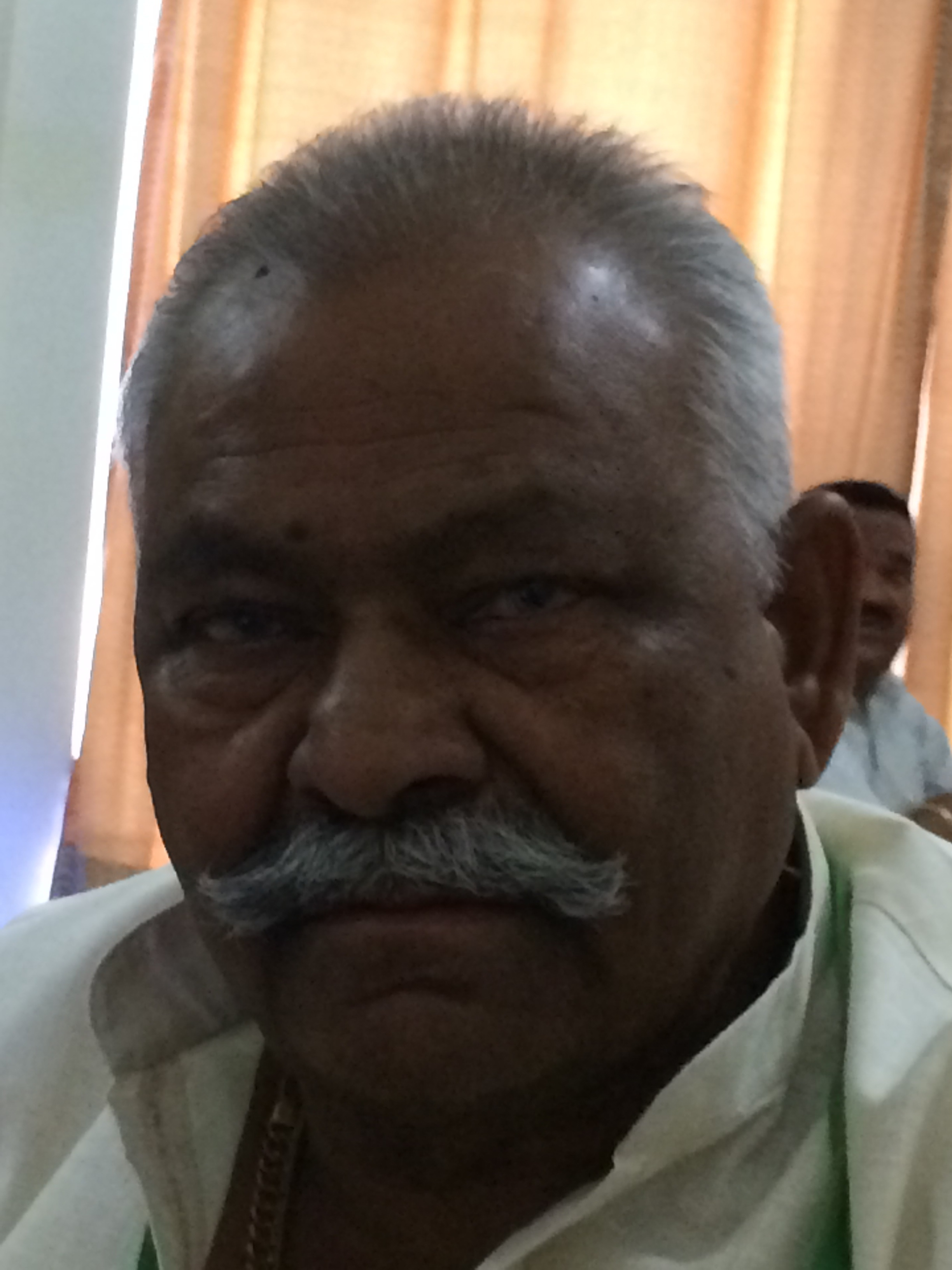
- Singh in 2014

Member of Legislative Assembly from Thakurdwara
- In office 24 June 1991 – 13 May 2007
- Preceded by: Mohammadulla Khan
- Succeeded by: Vijay Yadav
- In office 6 March 2012 – 21 May 2014
- Preceded by: Vijay Yadav
- Succeeded by: Nawab Jaan Khan

Member of Parliament from Moradabad
- In office 21 May 2014 – 23 May 2019
- Preceded by: Mohammad Azharuddin
- Succeeded by: S. T. Hasan

Personal details
- Born: 22 December 1952 Ratupura, Moradabad, Uttar Pradesh, India
- Died: 20 April 2024 (aged 71) New Delhi, India
- Party: Bharatiya Janata Party
- Spouse: Smt. Sadhna Singh
- Children: Kunwar Sushant Singh, one daughter
- Education: K.G.K Inter College, Moradabad
- Occupation: Politician

Kunwar Sarvesh Kumar Singh (also known as Rakesh Singh, 22 December 1952 – 20 April 2024) was an Indian businessman who served as the Member of Parliament from Moradabad, Uttar Pradesh, from Bharatiya Janata Party. He was a veteran politician from Western Uttar Pradesh who belonged to Thakur (Rajput) caste. He was one of the Bahubali politicians in Uttar Pradesh. He was a five-term MLA from Thakurdwara from 1991 to 2007 and 2012 to 2014 till he was elected as MP from Moradabad Lok Sabha General Election in 2014. His son Kunwar Sushant Singh is currently BJP MLA from Barhapur.

== Political life ==
His father, Ram Pal Singh was three term MLA from Thakurdwara and one term MP from Amroha. In 1991, he won his ancestral seat of Thakurdwara as the BJP candidate and remained until 2007 when Vijay Yadav from BSP won Thakurdwara. He contested from BJP in the Lok Sabha election in 2009 in Moradabad but lost to Mohammad Azharuddin. He contested the 2012 legislative election in Thakurdwara as the BJP candidate and won. He served as five term MLA from Thakurdwara till 2014 during Lok Sabha elections, he was nominated from Moradabad and he defeated Samajwadi Party candidate by a margin of 87,504 votes. He was the first BJP MP after independence to serve from Moradabad.

== Properties ==
Singh owned and lived in an ancestral haveli in Ratupura Village. He owned many colleges, schools and farms and orchards in Thakurdwara, Kashipur and Moradabad through his father's trust (Babu Rampal Singh Trust).

== Kanth violence incident, 2014 ==
After parliamentary elections in 2014, though he won the Lok Sabha constituency by a difference of 87,504 he entered lost from his own ruling Thakurdwara Vidhan Sabha Seat by difference of 475 votes. Kanth, another nearby Vidhan Sabha seat an incident pertains to the removal of a loudspeaker from the Sant Ravidas temple in Akbarpur Chaderi in Kanth. The temple attracts a large number of Dalit devotees and the loudspeaker, according to locals, had been there for several years. In early June, however, people of the Muslim community had in a written representation demanded that it be removed. The administration did not try to solve the dispute by involving elders of the two communities, and instead on Thursday, 26 June, a police team broke open the lock on its gate, entered into the temple and removed the loudspeaker. According to eyewitnesses, the policemen thrashed men and women who protested, and later arrested about a dozen people including women. The next day (Friday 27 June) a demonstration was held in main Kanth market and the crowd blocked the Moradabad-Hardwar road. The crowd was demanding that the loudspeaker be reinstalled and the arrested people be released. Amid the inaction of the police and administration, some people announced that they would install the loudspeaker themselves, and then the police cracked down on them. In the ensuing fracas several were injured. It is reported that the police went berserk after this, dragged people out of their homes and arrested them. It is said that after 26 June, district and police officials tried to win over a section of the BJP leaders and even the Moradabad MP Kunwar Sarvesh Kumar Singh, to come up with a compromise. However, as this news spread and the hardline Hindu Jagaran Manch took the matter into its own hands. The BJP then jumped into the fray and called for a mahapanchayat on this issue on 4 July. Moradabad MP Kunwar Sarvesh Kumar Singh, Amroha MP Kunwar Singh Tanwar, Sambhal MP Satyapal Saini, Rampur MP Nepal Singh, MLA Sangeet Som and their supporters were briefly detained when they were arriving for the mahapanchayat. Sangeet Som is also an accused in the Muzaffarangar Riots. Moradabad district magistrate Chandrakant was seriously injured Friday when a mob threw stones at policemen after the BJP leaders' arrest. The official was sent to hospital for a serious head and eye injury. BJP supporters fought at Kanth as police carried out lathi charge, lobbed teargas shells and shot blanks in the air to disperse the crowds which had stopped some trains. The district administration was more intent on stopping the mahapanchayat rather than solving the issue, he said. The state BJP has constituted a four-member team that will look into the incident and submit a report to the party leadership. Senior Superintendent of Police (SSP) of Moradabad, Dharamvir Yadav, in an uncharacteristically political statement, on Saturday blamed the BJP for the tense situation in Kanth, and said that BJP MP Kunwar Sarvesh Kumar Singh had wanted to "polarise the situation ahead of the by-elections to be held in the state." He said the BJP's mahapanchayat call had only added to the already volatile situation.

== Personal life and death ==
Singh was born on 22 December 1952 to Raja Rampal Singh. He married Kunwarani Sadhna Singh of Kookra Estate on 26 May 1983; they had one daughter and one son, Kunwar Sushant Singh.

As the titular Maharaja of Saupari, he had strong relations with Haldaur Estate and other Bijnor's princely states.

Singh died from a heart attack at the All India Institute of Medical Sciences in Delhi, on 20 April 2024. He was 71. At the time of his death, Singh was the BJP's candidate for Moradabad Lok Sabha Constituency. Voting for the Moradabad seat took place a day before his death. The late BJP nominee did not participate in his own election campaign due to ongoing health conditions.

== Legacy ==
Singh was the first post-independence MP from BJP serving from Moradabad. He was the only serving MLA from Thakurdwara for serving the most from this constituency in Assembly Elections for five terms all on BJP tickets. He launched several developmental schemes in this region and has also tried hard to get loan facility better for farmers, small businesses and large businesses. For that he has involved various national as well as regional banks in his prospective financial projects. This parliamentarian has worked on a number of developmental projects and constructive activities, which include the laying foundation of schools/colleges, appointing of school teachers, civic buildings, long-delayed bridges, getting roads constructed and qualified doctors working in primary health centres in Moradabad. He has also donated much money to NGO Janata Shiksha Prasar Samiti for development of this region.

== Posts held in Parliament ==
#	Position
01	Member, Standing Committee on Energy
02	Member, Consultative Committee, Ministry of Power and New and Renewable Energy

== See also ==
- Kunwar Sushant Singh
- Manoj Kumar Chauhan
- Kunwar Bhartendra Singh
