= Shafiqur Rahman Barq =

Indian politician (1930–2024)

Member of Parliament, Lok Sabha
- In office 23 May 2019 – 27 February 2024
- Preceded by: Satyapal Singh Saini
- Succeeded by: Zia ur Rahman Barq
- Constituency: Sambhal
- In office 2009–2014
- Preceded by: Ram Gopal Yadav
- Succeeded by: Satyapal Singh Saini
- Constituency: Sambhal
- In office 2004–2009
- Preceded by: Chandra Vijay Singh
- Succeeded by: Mohammad Azharuddin
- Constituency: Moradabad
- In office 1996–1999
- Preceded by: Ghulam Mohammad Khan
- Succeeded by: Chandra Vijay Singh
- Constituency: Moradabad

Member (MLA) in Uttar Pradesh Legislative Assembly
- In office 1985–1992
- Preceded by: Shariyatulla
- Succeeded by: Iqbal Mehmood
- Constituency: Sambhal
- In office 1974–1980
- Preceded by: Mahmood Hasan Khan
- Succeeded by: Shariyatulla
- Constituency: Sambhal

Personal details
- Born: 11 July 1930 Sambhal, United Provinces of Agra and Oudh, British India
- Died: 27 February 2024 (aged 93) Moradabad, Uttar Pradesh, India
- Party: Samajwadi Party
- Other political affiliations: Bahujan Samaj Party (2009-2014)
- Spouse: Queresha Begum (m. 1948)
- Relations: Zia ur Rahman Barq (grandson)
- Children: Mamluk Ur Rahman Barq (son)
- Education: Agra University
- Occupation: Politician
- Profession: Social worker, businessperson & politician

Shafiqur Rahman Barq (11 July 1930 – 27 February 2024) was an Indian politician belonging to the Samajwadi Party. He was elected to the Lok Sabha at various times from Moradabad as the Samajwadi Party candidate and Sambhal, most recently in 2019. He had declared assets worth rupees 1 crore 32 lacs.

== Career ==
Barq came into the news after taking the oath as a member of the Lok Sabha when he declared that Vande Mataram was against Islam and that Muslims cannot follow it.

Barq received widespread criticism for defending the Taliban takeover of Afghanistan and equating it with India's own freedom struggle.

== Positions held ==
Shafiqur Rahman Barq was elected four times as MLA and 5 times as Lok Sabha MP.

#	From	To	Position	Party
1.	1974	1977	MLA (1st term) in 6th Vidhan Sabha from Sambhal	BKD
2.	1977	1980	MLA (2nd term) from Sambhal	Janata Party
3.	1985	1989	MLA (3rd term) from Sambhal	Lok Dal
4.	1989	1991	MLA (4th term) from Sambhal	Janata Dal
5.	1996	1998	MP (1st term) in 11th Lok Sabha from Moradabad	SP
6.	1998	1999	MP (2nd term) in 12th Lok Sabha from Moradabad	SP
7.	2004	2009	MP (3rd term) in 14th Lok Sabha from Moradabad	SP
8.	2009	2014	MP (4th term) in 15th Lok Sabha from Sambhal	BSP
9.	2019	2024	MP (5th term) in 17th Lok Sabha from Sambhal	SP

== Death ==
Shafiqur died after suffering from a prolonged illness on 27 February 2024, at the age of 93. As per a Dainik Bhaskar report, over 60,000 individuals attended Dr. Barq's funeral. The prayer was led by the Sajjada Nashin of Khanqah-e-Barkatiya, Ameen Mian Quadri. According to a Facebook post by Barq, he was a devoted follower of Ahmed Raza Khan Barelvi.
