= Mohammad Yusuf Ansari =

Indian politician

MLA, 16th Legislative Assembly
- In office Mar 2012 – Mar 2017
- Preceded by: Sandeep Agarwal
- Succeeded by: Ritesh Kumar Gupta
- Constituency: Moradabad Nagar

Personal details
- Born: 7 April 1958 (age 68) Moradabad district, Uttar Pradesh
- Citizenship: India
- Party: Samajwadi Party
- Spouse: Nafisa Begum
- Children: 1 son and 5 daughters
- Parent: Mohammad Ayub (father)
- Profession: Businessperson, politician

Mohammad Yusuf Ansari is an Indian politician and a member of the 16th Legislative Assembly of Uttar Pradesh of India. He represented the Moradabad Nagar constituency of Uttar Pradesh and is a member of the Samajwadi Party.

== Early life and education ==
Mohammad Yusuf Ansari was born in Moradabad district, Uttar Pradesh. He has not received any formal education but is literate. Before being elected as MLA, he used to work as a businessperson.

== Political career ==
Mohammad Yusuf Ansari has been a MLA for one term. He represented the Moradabad Nagar constituency and is a member of the Samajwadi Party.

== Posts held ==
#	From	To	Position	Comments
01	2012	Mar-2017	Member, 16th Legislative Assembly	

== See also ==
- Moradabad Nagar
- Politics of India
- Sixteenth Legislative Assembly of Uttar Pradesh
- Uttar Pradesh Legislative Assembly
