= Amarpurkashi =

Village in Uttar Pradesh, India

Amarpurkashi is a village in Moradabad District, Uttar Pradesh, India. The Amarpurkashi Project has been ongoing in the village. The campaign against a local paper mill has seen a number of volunteers sent through a British-based NGO called The Asian Foundation for Philanthropy.
