= Mohammad Ghazi =

Mohammad Ghazi may refer to:

- Mohammad Ghazi (footballer), Iranian footballer
- Mohammad Ghazi (politician), Indian politician
- Mohammad Ghazi (translator), Iranian translator
