= Shameemul Haq =

Indian politician

MLA, 16th Legislative Assembly
- In office Mar 2012 – 2017
- Preceded by: Usmanul Haq
- Succeeded by: Haji Ikram Qureshi
- Constituency: Moradabad Rural

MLA, 14th Legislative Assembly
- In office Feb 2002 – May 2007
- Preceded by: Saulat Ali
- Succeeded by: Usmanul Haq
- Constituency: Moradabad Rural

Personal details
- Born: 15 July 1955 (age 70) Moradabad district, Uttar Pradesh
- Citizenship: India
- Party: Samajwadi Party
- Other political affiliations: Indian National Congress
- Spouse: Sartaj Begum
- Children: 2 sons and 2 daughters
- Parent: Ataul Haq (father)
- Profession: Agriculturist & Politician

Shameemul Haq is an Indian politician and a member of the 16th Legislative Assembly of Uttar Pradesh of India. He represents the Moradabad Rural constituency of Uttar Pradesh and is a member of the Samajwadi Party.

== Early life and education ==
Shameemul Haq was born in Moradabad district, Uttar Pradesh. He has received education till 10th grade. Before being elected as MLA, he used to work as an agriculturist.

== Political career ==
Shameemul Haq has been a MLA for two terms. During both his terms, he represented the Moradabad Rural constituency. During his first term (in 2002) he was a member of the Indian National Congress and during his second term (2012) he was a member of the Samajwadi Party.

== Posts held ==
#	From	To	Position	Comments
01	2002	2007	Member, 14th Legislative Assembly	
02	2012	2017	Member, 16th Legislative Assembly	

== See also ==
- Moradabad Rural
- Politics of India
- Sixteenth Legislative Assembly of Uttar Pradesh
- Uttar Pradesh Legislative Assembly
