= Rajesh Kumar Singh (Uttar Pradesh politician) =

Indian politician

MLA, 17th Legislative Assembly
- Incumbent
- Assumed office 2017
- Preceded by: Aneesurrehman
- Constituency: Kanth (Assembly constituency), Uttar Pradesh

MLA, 13th Legislative Assembly of Uttar Pradesh
- In office October 1996 – May 2002
- Preceded by: Mahboob Ali
- Succeeded by: Rizwan Ahmad Khan
- Constituency: Kanth (Assembly constituency), Uttar Pradesh

Personal details
- Party: Bharatiya Janata Party
- Occupation: MLA
- Profession: Politician

Rajesh Kumar Singh is an Indian politician and a member of 13th and 17th Legislative Assembly of Uttar Pradesh, of India. He represents the ‘Kanth (Assembly constituency)’ in Moradabad district of Uttar Pradesh.

== Political career ==
Rajesh Kumar Singh contested Uttar Pradesh Assembly Election as Bharatiya Janata Party candidate and defeated his close contestant Anees Ur Rehman from Samajwadi Party with a margin of 2,348 votes.

== Posts held ==
| # | From | To | Position | Comments |
|---|---|---|---|---|
| 01 | October 1996 | May 2002 | Member, 13th Legislative Assembly | |
| 02 | March 2017 | Incumbent | Member, 17th Legislative Assembly | |
