= Moradabad Rural Assembly constituency =

Legislative Assembly constituency in Uttar Pradesh State, India

Coordinates: 28.97°N 78.79°E

Moradabad Rural
- Constituency No. 27 for the Uttar Pradesh Legislative Assembly

Constituency details
- Country: India
- Region: North India
- State: Uttar Pradesh
- District: Moradabad
- Lok Sabha constituency: Moradabad
- Total electors: 389,729
- Reservation: None

Member of Legislative Assembly
- 18th Uttar Pradesh Legislative Assembly
- Incumbent Haji Nasir Qureshi
- Party: Samajwadi Party
- Elected year: 2022

Moradabad Rural is one of the 403 Legislative Assembly constituencies of Uttar Pradesh state in India.

It is part of Moradabad district.

== Members of Legislative Assembly ==
Year	Member	Party
1957	Khamani Singh	Independent
1962	Riasat Hussain	Praja Socialist Party
1967	Khamani Singh	Indian National Congress
1969	Riasat Hussain	Praja Socialist Party
1974	Om Prakash	Independent
1977	Riasat Hussain	Independent
1980	Riasat Hussain	Independent
1985	Mohammad Rizwanul Haq	Lokdal
1989	Mohammad Rizwanul Haq	Janata Dal
1991	Mohammad Rizwanul Haq	Janata Dal
1993	Suresh Pratap Singh	Bharatiya Janata Party
1996	Saulat Ali	Samajwadi Party
2002	Shameemul Haq	Indian National Congress
2007	Usmanul Haq	Samajwadi Party
2012	Shameemul Haq	Samajwadi Party
2017	Ikram Qureshi	Samajwadi Party
2022	Mohd Nasir Qureshi	Samajwadi Party

== Election results ==
=== 2027 ===
2027 Uttar Pradesh Legislative Assembly election: Moradabad Rural
Party	Candidate	Votes	%	±%
INDIA				
NDA				
AIMIM				
BSP				
Majority				
Turnout				
gain from		Swing		

=== 2022 ===
2022 Uttar Pradesh Legislative Assembly election: Moradabad Rural
Party	Candidate	Votes	%	±%
SP	Mohd Nasir Qureshi	143,337	56.88	+12.65
BJP	Krishankant Mishra	86,517	34.34	+3.11
BSP	Aqeel Choudhary	13,598	5.4	−3.66
INC	Haji Ikram Qureshi	2,595	1.03	
AIMIM	Mohd Fargani	2,380	0.94	−0.64
NOTA	None of the above	1,071	0.43	+0.14
Majority		56,820	22.54	+9.54
Turnout		251,978	64.65	+2.55
SP hold		Swing		

=== 2017 ===
2017 Uttar Pradesh Legislative Assembly election: Moradabad Rural
Party	Candidate	Votes	%	±%
SP	Haji Ikram Qureshi	97,916	44.23	
BJP	Hariom Sharma	69,135	31.23	
RLD	Mohd Kamranul Haq	23,404	10.57	
BSP	Pannalal Saini	20,054	9.06	
AIMIM	Mohd Aslam	3,503	1.58	
Independent	Faheem Ahmed	2,038	0.92	
NOTA	None of the above	639	0.29	
Majority		28,781	13.0	
Turnout		221,367	62.1	
SP hold		Swing		

== See also ==
- List of constituencies of the Uttar Pradesh Legislative Assembly
- Moradabad district
