= Nawab Jan =

Indian politician

Nawab Jan Khan

MLA, 17th Legislative Assembly
- Incumbent
- Assumed office March 2017
- Preceded by: Self
- Constituency: Thakurdwara

MLA, 16th Legislative Assembly
- In office September 2014 – March 2017
- Preceded by: Kunwar Sarvesh Kumar Singh
- Succeeded by: Self
- Constituency: Thakurdwara

Personal details
- Born: 1 September 1958 (age 68) Thakurdwara, Moradabad district, Uttar Pradesh
- Citizenship: India
- Party: Samajwadi Party
- Spouse: Shaista Begum
- Children: Abdal Khan
- Parent: Raees Jaan (father)
- Education: Santana Hindu college
- Profession: Politician

Nawab Jan is an Indian politician and a member of the 16th Legislative Assembly of Uttar Pradesh and 17th Legislative Assembly of Uttar Pradesh, India. He represents the Thakurdwara constituency of Uttar Pradesh and is a member of the Samajwadi Party political party.

== Early life and education ==
Nawab Jan was born in Moradabad district, Uttar Pradesh. Before being elected as MLA, he used to work as an agriculturist.

== Political career ==
Nawab Jan has been a MLA for 2nd term and represents the Thakurdwara constituency. He is a member of the Samajwadi Party political party. Jan was elected during the by-elections in Sep 2014 and assembly election in 2017.

== Posts Held ==
#	From	To	Position	Comments
01	2014	Mar-2017	Member, 16th Legislative Assembly	
02	Mar-2017	Incumbent	Member, 17th Legislative Assembly	

== See also ==
- Samajwadi Party
- Sixteenth Legislative Assembly of Uttar Pradesh
- Thakurdwara
- Uttar Pradesh Legislative Assembly
