= Kanth Assembly constituency =

Constituency of the Uttar Pradesh legislative assembly in India

Kanth
- Constituency No. 25 for the Uttar Pradesh Legislative Assembly

Constituency details
- Country: India
- Region: North India
- State: Uttar Pradesh
- District: Moradabad
- Total electors: 388404 (2022)
- Reservation: None

Member of Legislative Assembly
- 18th Uttar Pradesh Legislative Assembly
- Incumbent Kamal Akhtar
- Party: Samajwadi Party
- Elected year: 2022

Kanth Assembly constituency is one of the 403 constituencies of the Uttar Pradesh Legislative Assembly, India. It is a part of the Moradabad district and one of the five assembly constituencies in the Moradabad Lok Sabha constituency. First election in this assembly constituency was held in 1957 after the delimitation order (DPACO - 1956) was passed in 1956. The constituency was assigned identification number 25 after "Delimitation of Parliamentary and Assembly Constituencies Order, 2008" was passed in the year 2008.

== Wards / Areas ==
Extent of Kanth Assembly constituency is Kanth Teshil; PCs Baheri Brahmanan, Adampur, Salem Sarai, Maksoodpur of Jatpura KC, PCs Sadarpur, Milak Amawati, Kazipura, Gakkharpur, Mustafapur of Dilari KC of Thakurdwara Teshil & KC Pakbara of Moradabad Teshil.

== Members of Vidhan Sabha ==
Year	Member	Party
1957	Jitendra Pratap Singh	Indian National Congress
1962	Daudayal Khanna	Indian National Congress
1967	Kunwar Jagat Singh Farswal (Pahari Dheeraj, Purani Dilli)	Independent
1969	Nau Nihal Singh	Bharatiya Kranti Dal
1974	Chandra Pal Singh	Bharatiya Kranti Dal
1977	Hargovind Singh	Janata Party
1980	Ram Kishan	Indian National Congress (U)
1985	Samar Pal Singh	Indian National Congress
1989	Chandra Pal Singh	Janata Dal
1991	Thakur Pal Singh	Bharatiya Janata Party
1993	Mehboob Ali	Janata Party
1996	Rajesh Kumar Singh	Bharatiya Janata Party
2002	Rizwan Ahmad Khan	Bahujan Samaj Party
2007	Rizwan Ahmad Khan	Bahujan Samaj Party
2012	Aneesurrehman	Peace Party of India
2017	Rajesh Kumar Singh	Bharatiya Janata Party
2022	Kamal Akhtar	Samajwadi Party

== Election results ==
=== 2027 ===
2027 Uttar Pradesh Legislative Assembly election: Kanth
Party	Candidate	Votes	%	±%
INDIA				
NDA				
AIMIM				
BSP				
Majority				
Turnout				
gain from		Swing		

=== 2022 ===
2022 Uttar Pradesh Legislative Assembly election: Kanth
Party	Candidate	Votes	%	±%
SP	Kamal Akhtar	134,692	49.19	+19.97
BJP	Rajesh Kumar Singh	91,514	33.42	+3.27
BSP	Afaaq Ali Khan	36,341	13.27	−4.04
AIMIM	Mohd Raisuddin	2,886	1.05	−8.0
NOTA	None of the above	1,031	0.38	−0.1
Majority		43,178	15.77	+14.84
Turnout		273,839	70.11	−1.06
SP gain from BJP		Swing		

=== 2017 ===
2017 Uttar Pradesh Legislative Assembly election: Kanth
Party	Candidate	Votes	%	±%
BJP	Rajesh Kumar Singh	76,307	30.15	
SP	Aneesurrehman	73,959	29.22	
BSP	Mohd Nasir	43,820	17.31	
AIMIM	Fizaullah Chaudhry	22,908	9.05	
PECP	Muhammed Usman Ali	13,931	5.5	
Independent	Dinesh Kumar Saini	10,924	4.32	
RLD	Afak Ali Khan	3,458	1.37	
NOTA	None of the above	1,199	0.48	
Majority		2,348	0.93	
Turnout		253,108	71.17	
BJP gain from PECP		Swing		

=== 2012 ===
Uttar Pradesh Legislative Assembly Elections: Kanth
Party	Candidate	Votes	%	±%
PECP	Aneesurrehman	37092	18.48%	
BSP	Rizwan Ahmed Khan	35558	17.72%	
SP	Fizaullah Choudhary	30690	15.29%	
Majority		37092	18.48%	
Turnout		2,00,721	67%	

=== 1967 ===
- J. Singh (IND) : 30,583 votes
- Dau Dayal Khanna (INC) : 17,233

== See also ==
- Government of Uttar Pradesh
- List of Vidhan Sabha constituencies of Uttar Pradesh
- Moradabad district
- Moradabad Lok Sabha constituency
- Sixteenth Legislative Assembly of Uttar Pradesh
- Uttar Pradesh
- Uttar Pradesh Legislative Assembly
