= Usmanul Haq =

Indian politician

Member of 2007 Uttar Pradesh Legislative Assembly election
- In office 2007–2012
- Constituency: Moradabad Rural (Assembly constituency)

Personal details
- Party: Samajwadi Party
- Parent: Rizwan ul haq
- Profession: Agriculture

Usmanul Haq is an Indian politicians and member of Samajwadi Party. He was elected from Moradabad Rural (Assembly constituency) 2007 Uttar Pradesh Legislative Assembly election.
