= Moradabad Nagar Assembly constituency =

Legislative Assembly constituency in Uttar Pradesh State, India

Coordinates: 28.84°N 78.76°E

Moradabad Nagar
- Constituency No. 28 for the Uttar Pradesh Legislative Assembly

Constituency details
- Country: India
- Region: North India
- State: Uttar Pradesh
- District: Moradabad
- Lok Sabha constituency: Moradabad
- Total electors: 529,243
- Reservation: None

Member of Legislative Assembly
- 18th Uttar Pradesh Legislative Assembly
- Incumbent Ritesh Kumar Gupta
- Party: Bharatiya Janata Party
- Elected year: 2017

Moradabad Nagar is one of the 403 Legislative Assembly constituencies of Uttar Pradesh state in India.

It is part of Moradabad district.

== Members of Legislative Assembly ==
Year	Member	Party
1952	Kedar Nath	Indian National Congress
1957	Halimuddin	Independent
1962	Halimuddin	Republican Party of India
1967	Onkar Saran	Indian National Congress
1969	Halimuddin Rahat Maulaey	Independent
1974	Dineshchandra Rastogi	Bharatiya Jana Sangh
1977	Dineshchandra Rastogi	Janata Party
1980	Hafiz Siddiq	Indian National Congress (I)
1985	Pushpa Singhal	Indian National Congress
1989	Shamim Ahmad Khan	Janata Dal
1991	Zahid Hussain	Janata Dal
1993	Sandeep Agarwal	Bharatiya Janata Party
1996	Sandeep Agarwal	Bharatiya Janata Party
2002	Sandeep Agarwal	Bharatiya Janata Party
2007	Sandeep Agarwal	Samajwadi Party
2012	Mohammad Yusuf Ansari	Samajwadi Party
2017	Ritesh Kumar Gupta	Bharatiya Janata Party
2022	Ritesh Kumar Gupta	Bharatiya Janata Party

== Election results ==
=== 2027 ===
2027 Uttar Pradesh Legislative Assembly election: Moradabad Nagar
Party	Candidate	Votes	%	±%
INDIA				
NDA				
BSP				
NOTA	None of the above			
Majority				
Turnout				
gain from		Swing		

=== 2022 ===
2017 Uttar Pradesh Legislative Assembly election: Moradabad Nagar
Party	Candidate	Votes	%	±%
BJP	Ritesh Kumar Gupta	148,384	46.12	▲1.52
SP	Mohammad Yusuf Ansari	147,602	45.88	▲2.43
BSP	Irshad Hussain	14,013	4.36	▼4.55
INC	Rizwan Qureshi	5,351	1.66	
NOTA	None of the above	1,400	0.44	▲0.13
Majority		782	0.24	▼0.91
Turnout		321,704	60.79	▲1.99
BJP hold		Swing		

=== 2017 ===
2017 Uttar Pradesh Legislative Assembly election: Moradabad Nagar
Party	Candidate	Votes	%	±%
BJP	Ritesh Kumar Gupta	123,467	44.6	
SP	Mohammad Yusuf Ansari	120,274	43.45	
BSP	Ateeq Ahmed Saifi	24,650	8.91	
NOTA	None of the above	855	0.31	
Majority		3,193	1.15	
Turnout		276,805	58.8	
BJP gain from SP		Swing	+2.42	

== See also ==
- List of constituencies of the Uttar Pradesh Legislative Assembly
- Moradabad district
