= Bilari, Gorakhpur district =

Village in India

Bilari is a village in Gorakhpur, Uttar Pradesh, India. For the same-named city, go to Bilari.
