= Ratupura =

- Village
- Location in Uttar Pradesh, India
- Coordinates: 29.16°N 78.79°E
- Country: India
- State: Uttar Pradesh
- District: Moradabad

Government
  - Sarpanch (Pradhan): Sarvesh Devi
- Elevation: 220 m (720 ft)

Population (2011)
  - Total: 8,305

Languages
  - Official: Hindi
- Time zone: UTC+5:30 (IST)
- PIN: 244 601
- Telephone code: 0591
- Vehicle registration: UP-21

Ratupura (Hindi:रतूपुरा) is a village of Thakurdwara Tehsil, Moradabad District, Uttar Pradesh, India.

== Geography ==
This village is situated on Thakurdwara-Kanth Highway. It is located at an 8 km distance from Thakurdwara, 20 km distance from Kashipur, a 24 km distance from Kanth, a 42 km from Moradabad, a 210 km from National Capital New Delhi, a 389 km from Uttar Pradesh's capital Lucknow. The nearest railway station is Kashipur Junction, Uttarakhand(20 km).

== Demographics ==
As of a 2011 India census, Ratupura had a population of 8,305. Males constitute 52.4% of the population and females constitute 47.6%. Ratupura has an average literacy rate of 57.3%, lower than the national average of 59.5%: male literacy is 66.4%, and female literacy is 47.3%. In Ratupura 13.7% of the population is under 6 years of age.
