= Handalpur =

Village in Uttar Pradesh, India

- Village
- Country: India
- State: Uttar Pradesh
- District: Moradabad

Population
  - Total: 1,200

Languages
  - Official: Hindi
- Time zone: UTC+5:30 (IST)
- PIN: 244301
- Vehicle registration: UP-21
- Nearest city: bilari
- Sex ratio: 980 ♂/♀
- Literacy: 51%
- Lok Sabha constituency: sambhal

Handalpur is a small village in Moradabad district, Uttar Pradesh. There are two Hindu temples in this village, one of them being Shiv and the other Durga. There are two melas held yearly, on Maha Shivaratri and Krishna Janmashtami. Most of the people of this village are of the Jat community.
