= 1888 Moradabad hailstorm =

Weather event in Uttar Pradesh, India

The 1888 Moradabad hailstorm was a severe hailstorm that occurred on 30 April 1888 in Moradabad, in the Indian state of Uttar Pradesh. It had the "greatest recorded loss of life", killing 246 people and 1600 livestock with hailstones as large as "cricket balls". The hailstones were reportedly as big as duck eggs and oranges.
