= Ghulam Mohammad Khan =

Indian politician, social worker and industrialist (born 1927)

Haji Ghulam Mohammad Khan

Member of 6th, 7th, 9th and 10th Lok Sabha
- In office 1977–1991

Personal details
- Born: 30 December 1927 Moradabad, Uttar Pradesh
- Parent: Wali Mohammad Khan

Haji Ghulam Mohammad Khan (born 30 December 1927) is an Indian former politician, social worker and industrialist. He was a member of 6th Lok Sabha, 7th Lok Sabha, 9th Lok Sabha and 10th Lok Sabha from Moradabad in Uttar Pradesh, India.

== Early life ==
Khan was born on 30 December 1927 at village Mohammadganj, Moradabad district, Uttar Pradesh.
