= Chandra Vijay Singh =

Indian politician

Chandra Vijay Singh (Baby Raja)
- Born: 19 December 1950 (age 75); Lucknow, Uttar Pradesh India
- Education: The Doon School
- Alma mater: University of Delhi
- Occupation: Politician
- Political party: Bharatiya Janata Party

Raja Chandra Vijay Singh (born 18 December 1950) is an Indian politician and Raja of Sahaspur.

== Early life and education ==
Raja Chandra Vijay Singh Urf (Baby Raja) was born in Lucknow, Uttar Pradesh. He was educated at The Doon School in Dehradun, and thereafter studied law (LL.B.) at the Faculty of Law, University of Delhi.

== Political career ==
He has been a Member of the Uttar Pradesh Legislative Assembly (two terms) 1989/1991 and 1993/1995) and has also been a Member of Parliament for the Bharatiya Janata Party, representing Moradabad (13th Lok Sabha – 1999/2004). In 2004 he was defeated for reelection by Shafiqurrahman Barq.
