= Khalilpur Amru =

Village in district Moradabad

Coordinates: 28°59′N 78°39′E

Khalilpur Amru is a village situated on the Moradabad-Haridwar highway (SH49) in the Moradabad district of Uttar Pradesh state, India. It forms part of the Bhikanpur gram panchayat. According to the 2011 census of India, its population was 1,366, comprising 699 males and 667 females.
