= Rizwan Ahmad Khan =

Indian politician

Rizwan Ahmed Khan

Member of Uttar Pradesh Legislative Assembly
- In office February 2002 – March 2012
- Constituency: Kanth

Personal details
- Born: 13 August 1940 (age 85)
- Party: Bahujan Samaj Party
- Occupation: Politician

Rizwan Ahmad Khan (born 13 August 1940) is an Indian politician and member of the Bahujan Samaj Party. He represented Kanth (Assembly constituency), Uttar Pradesh in the 14th and 15th Legislative Assembly of Uttar Pradesh. He held office from February 2002 to March 2012.
