= S. T. Hasan =

Member of the 17th Lok Sabha

Syed Tufail Hasan

Member of Parliament, Lok Sabha
- In office 23 May 2019 – 4 June 2024
- Preceded by: Kunwar Sarvesh Kumar Singh
- Succeeded by: Ruchi Veera
- Constituency: Moradabad

MAYOR Moradabad Nagar Nigam
- In office 2006–2012
- Preceded by: Veena Agarwal
- Succeeded by: Veena Agarwal
- Constituency: Moradabad

Personal details
- Born: 29 June 1958 (age 68) Moradabad, Uttar Pradesh, India
- Party: Samajwadi Party
- Other political affiliations: Mahagathbandhan
- Education: Jawaharlal Nehru Medical College, Aligarh Muslim University; MBBS(1981); M.S.(1984)
- Profession: Doctor

Syed Tufail Hasan is an Indian politician who has been a Member of Lok Sabha for Moradabad from 2019 to 2024.

== Education ==
He is a trained doctor (surgeon) with MBBS and MS degrees from Jawaharlal Nehru Medical College, Aligarh of Aligarh Muslim University.

== Political career ==
Hasan has served as mayor of Moradabad from 2006 to 2012. In 2014 Indian general election, Hasan contested from Moradabad constituency as a candidate of Samajwadi Party and was defeated by Kunwar Sarvesh Kumar Singh of Bharatiya Janata Party. On 30 March 2019, the party announced that Hasan would contest the upcoming 2019 Indian general election from Moradabad in place of Haji Nasir Qureshi. This was done as the local party leaders resented when Hasan was denied a ticket. On 23 May, he was elected to Lok Sabha after defeating Kunwar Sarvesh Kumar Singh by 97,878 votes.
