= Ritesh Kumar Gupta =

Indian politician

Member of the Uttar Pradesh Legislative Assembly
- Incumbent
- Assumed office 11 March 2017
- Preceded by: Mohammad Yusuf Ansari
- Constituency: Moradabad Nagar

Personal details
- Born: 8 March 1972 (age 53); Moradabad, Uttar Pradesh, India
- Political party: Bharatiya Janata Party
- Spouse: Alpana Gupta (m. 1995)
- Children: One Son, One Daughter
- Education: B. Com.

Ritesh Kumar Gupta is an Indian politician and member of 18th Uttar Pradesh Assembly and 17th Uttar Pradesh Assembly Uttar Pradesh Legislative Assembly.
