= Mohammad Ghazi (politician) =

Indian politician

MLA, 16th Legislative Assembly
- In office March 2012 – March 2017
- Preceded by: None
- Succeeded by: Kunwar Sushant Singh
- Constituency: Barhapur

MLA, 15th Legislative Assembly
- In office 2007–2012
- Preceded by: Indra Dev Singh
- Succeeded by: None
- Constituency: Afzalgarh

Personal details
- Born: 17 June 1974 (age 51) Bijnor district, Uttar Pradesh, India
- Party: Independent
- Spouse: Shabnam
- Children: 3
- Profession: Businessperson, politician

Mohammad Ghazi is an Indian politician and a member of the 16th Legislative Assembly of Uttar Pradesh of India. He represented the Barhapur constituency of Uttar Pradesh and was a member of the Bahujan Samaj Party political party.

== Early life and education ==
Ghazi was born in Bijnor district, Uttar Pradesh. He received education till ninth grade. Before being elected as MLA, he used to work as a businessperson.

== Political career ==
Ghazi had been a MLA for two straight terms. He represented the Barhapur constituency in his second term and was a member of the Bahujan Samaj Party. During his first term, he represented Afzalgarh (Assembly constituency).

== Controversy ==
On 7 January 2017, a criminal case was filed against Ghazi for threatening to send a Dhampur tehsildar to prison once the BSP assumed power after the upcoming Assembly elections. The tehsildar was removing political billboards in Sherkot when Ghazi made the threat while he and his supporters were attempting to prevent the tehsildar from removing the billboards. However, Ghazi claimed that the police were trying to file a false case against him on behalf of the ruling Samajwadi Party.

In April 2025, he was arrested by the Muzaffarnagar Police for supplying a mobile phone to his relative, who is lodged in a Muzaffarnagar jail.

== Posts held ==
#	From	To	Position	Comments
01	2007	2012	Member, 15th Legislative Assembly	
02	2012	2017	Member, 16th Legislative Assembly	

== See also ==
- Barhapur
- Uttar Pradesh Legislative Assembly
- Government of India
- Politics of India
- Bahujan Samaj Party
