= List of poets from Pratapgarh =

List of poets from Pratapgarh may refer to:

- Jumai Khan Azad
- Harivansh Rai Bachchan
- Bhikhari Das
- Kripalu Maharaj
- Sumitranandan Pant
- Nazish Pratapgarhi
- Kunwar Suresh Singh
- Tara Singh (author)
- Mohsin Zaidi

== Gallery ==
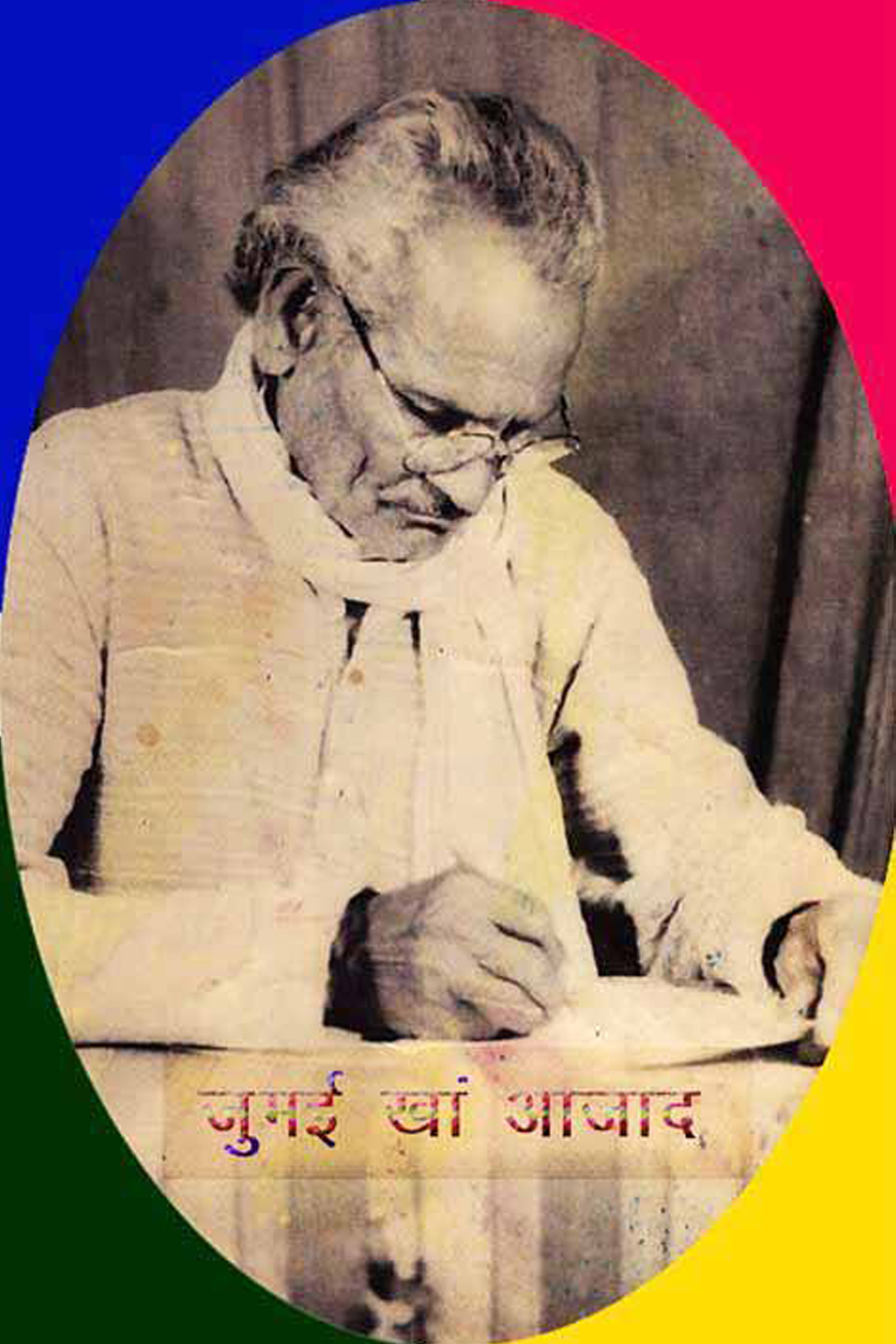
Jumai Khan Azad (1930–2013), was a prominent Awadhi language poet from Gobri village, Pratapgarh

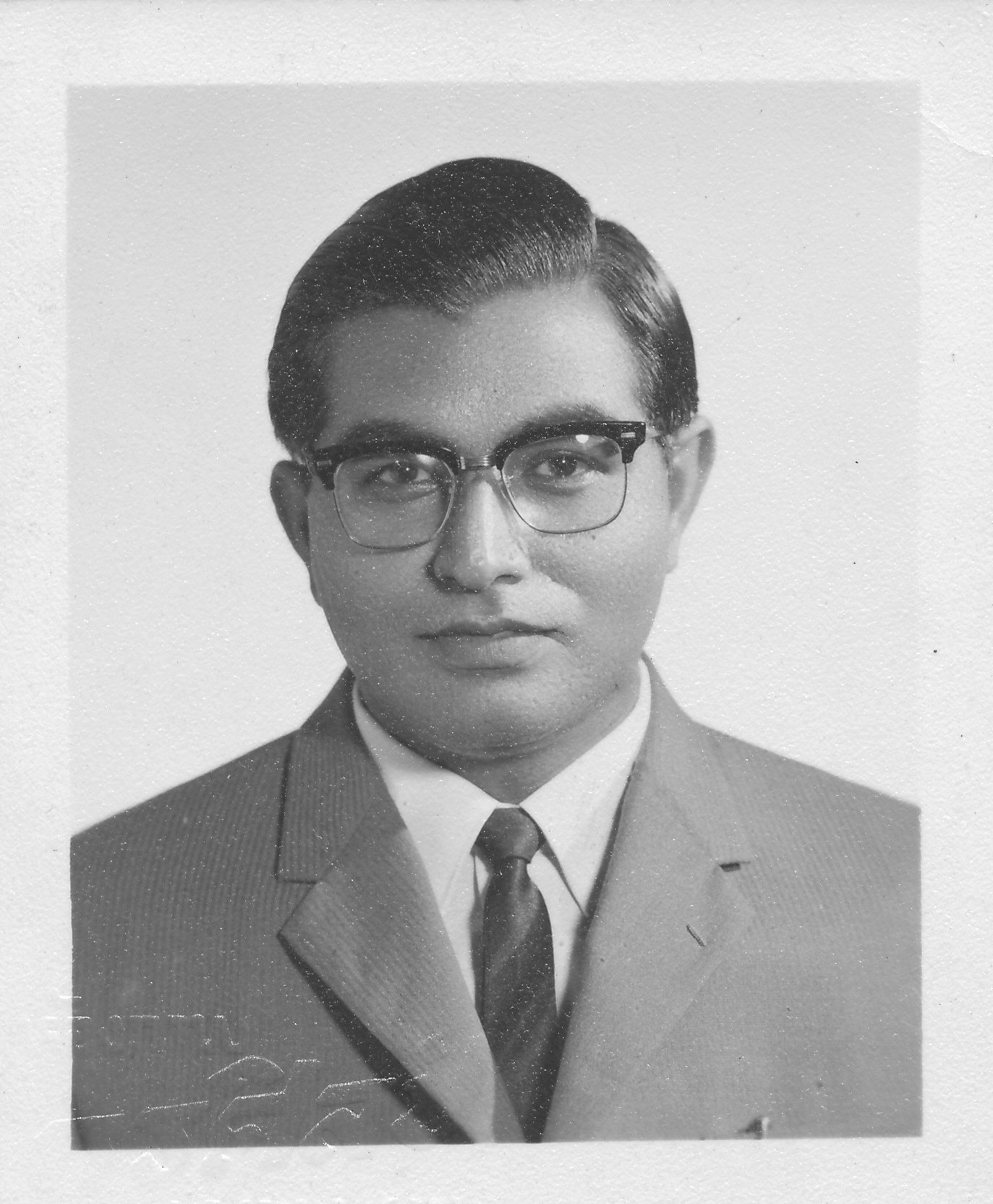
Mohsin Zaidi (1935 – 2003) was an Urdu poet, who had his early schooling in Pratapgarh, Uttar Pradesh - Islamia School (1940 – 1942); K. P. Hindu High School (1943 – 1948); Government High School (1949 – 1950).

== See also ==
- List of people from Pratapgarh
- List of people from Uttar Pradesh
- Pratapgarh district, Uttar Pradesh
