= Ram Pal Singh =

Member of Legislative Assembly from Thakurdwara
- In office 14 March 1962 – 14 March 1967
- Preceded by: Kishan Singh
- Succeeded by: Ahmed Ullah Khan
- In office 5 March 1974 – 30 April 1977
- Preceded by: Ahmed Ullah Khan
- Succeeded by: Mukeemur Rehman
- In office 9 June 1980 – 31 October 1984
- Preceded by: Mukeemur Rehman
- Succeeded by: Sakhawat Hussain

Member of Parliament from Amroha
- In office 31 October 1984 – 2 November 1989
- Preceded by: Chandrapal Singh
- Succeeded by: Har Govind Singh

Personal details
- Born: 28 March 1922 Manpur, Shiva Puri Taluk, Bijnore district, United Provinces, British India(present-day Uttar Pradesh, India)
- Died: Unknown
- Party: Indian National Congress
- Spouse(s): Shanti Devi and Vijay Luxmi
- Children: Sarvesh Kumar Singh

Ram Pal Singh was an Indian politician. He was elected to the Lok Sabha, the lower house of the Parliament of India, as a member of the Indian National Congress.
