= List of mayors of Moradabad =

Moradabad Mayoral Constituency is one of the 16 mayoral constituency in Uttar Pradesh.

== Total Number of Voters ==
Election	Polling Stations	Male Voters	Female Voters	Total Voters
2017	137	3,33,205	2,89,955	6,23,160

== List of Mayors ==
Year	Member	Political Party
1995	Humayun Qadeer	Samajwadi Party
2000	Veena Agarwal	Bharatiya Janata Party
2006	S. T. Hasan	Samajwadi Party
2012	Veena Agarwal	Bharatiya Janata Party
2016*	Vinod Agarwal	Bharatiya Janata Party
2017	Vinod Agarwal	Bharatiya Janata Party
2023	Vinod Agarwal	Bharatiya Janata Party

*By Election

== Election results ==
Uttar Pradesh Local Body Election, 2023: Moradabad
Party	Candidate	Votes	%	±%
BJP	Vinod Agarwal	121,415	44.0	
INC	Rizwan Qureshi	117,826	42.7	
BSP	Mohammad Yamin	15,845	5.7	
SP	Syed Raisuddin Naiyami	13,441	4.9	
AAP	Gurbinder Singh	5,567	2.0	
NOTA	None of the Above	1,636	0.62	
Majority		3,589	1.3	
Turnout		2,65,600	42.62	
BJP hold		Swing		

Uttar Pradesh Local Body Election, 2017: Moradabad
Party	Candidate	Votes	%	±%
BJP	Vinod Agarwal	94,677	35.65	
INC	Rizwan Qureshi	73,042	27.50	
SP	Mohammad Yusuf	47,740	17.97	
BSP	Lakhan Singh Saini	32,268	12.15	
AAP	Gurbinder Singh	5,567	2.10	
NOTA	None of the Above	1,636	0.62	
Majority		21,635	8.15	
Turnout		2,65,600	42.62	
BJP hold		Swing		

Uttar Pradesh Local Body By Election, 2016: Moradabad
Party	Candidate	Votes	%	±%
BJP	Vinod Agarwal	66,535	48.89	
SP	Raj Kumar Prajapati	30,720	22.57	
IND.	Kaiser Ali Quddusi	18,750	13.78	
INC	Anand Mohan Gupta	6,830	5.02	
Majority		35,815	26.32	
Turnout		1,36,090	24.56	
BJP hold		Swing		

Uttar Pradesh Local Body Election, 2012: Moradabad
Party	Candidate	Votes	%	±%
BJP	Veena Agarwal	99,182	44.46	
PECP	Humayun Qadir	29,071	13.03	
INC	Dr. Mohammad Sadiq	25,990	11.65	
Majority		70,111	31.43	
Turnout		2,23,105	N/A	
BJP gain from INC		Swing		
