= Bilari =

- city
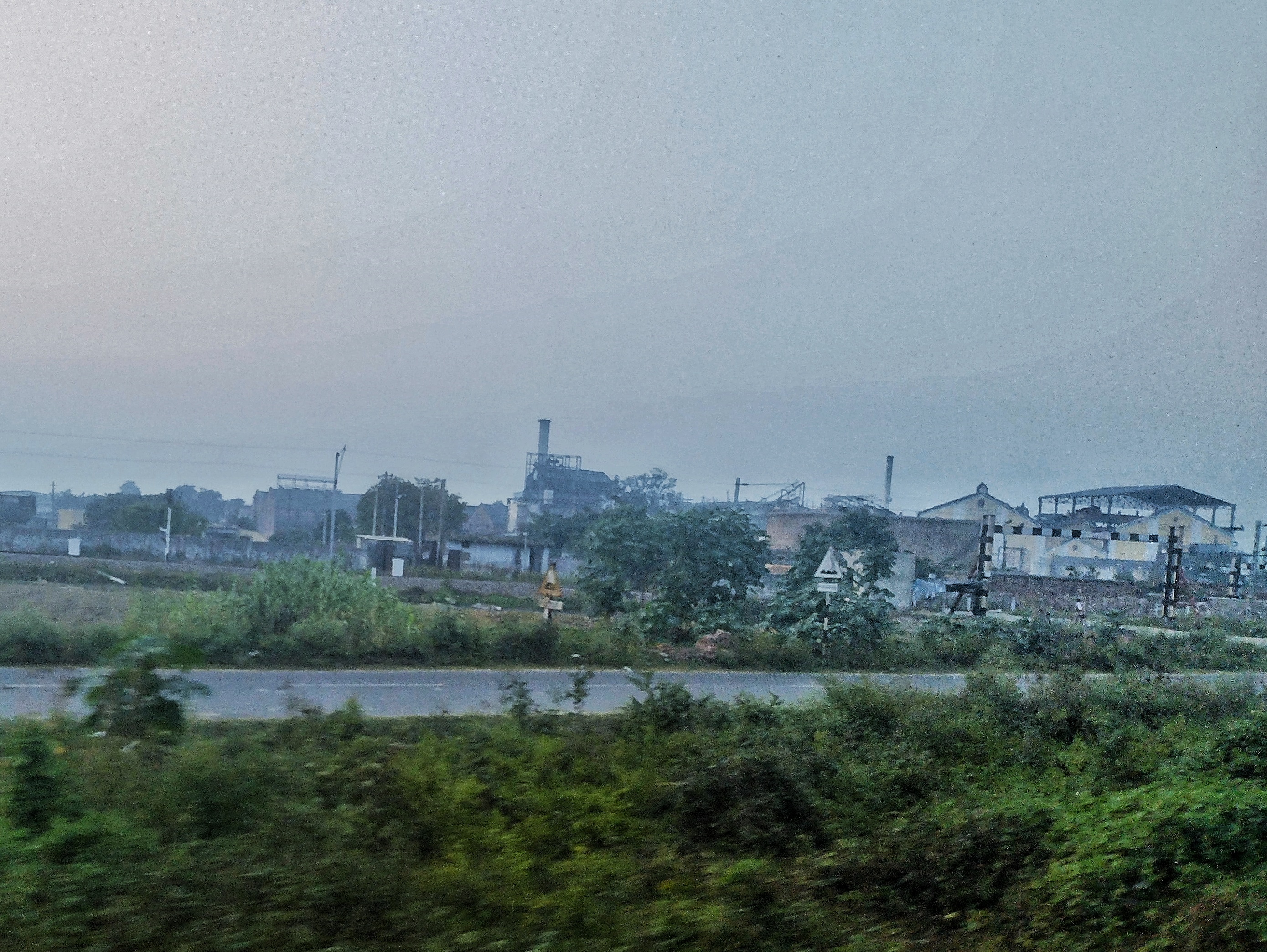
- Sugar Mill, Raja ka Sahaspur

- Location in Uttar Pradesh, India Bilari (India)
- Coordinates: 28.622°N 78.802°E
- Country: India
- State: Uttar Pradesh
- District: Moradabad

Government
  - MLA: Shri Mo Faeem Irfan
- Elevation: 184 m (604 ft)

Population (2001)
  - Total: 30,246

Languages
  - Official: Hindi
  - Spoken languages: Hindi, Urdu
- Time zone: UTC+5:30 (IST)
- PIN: 244411
- Telephone code: 5921
- Vehicle registration: UP 21
- Website: up.gov.in

Bilari is a city and a municipal board in Moradabad district in the state of Uttar Pradesh, India. It is connected by road as well as Indian Railways.

== Demographics ==
As of the 2001 Census of India, Bilari has a population of 30,246, of whom 15,992 are males and 14,254 are females. Children aged less than or equal to six years total 5,229, of which 2,697 are males and 2,532 are females. 13,520 of the population are literate, of which 8,156 are males and 5,364 female.

== Schools ==
- Ever Green Kohinoor Inter College
- Anwar Inter college, Mudiya Raja
- Azad Public Higher Secondary School Bilari
- Mind’s Eye International School
- Azad Public School Bilari.
- B H P Memorial Inter College Bilari
- Dr D P S Vidha Mandir Inter-College
- HSA Inter-College
- Janta Inter-College
- PCS Vidya Mandir
- HQM Public School
- Rani Pritam Kunwar School
- Ram Ratan Inter College
- Shri Manmohan Singh Vaidhji Public School
- Shankar Sahai Har Sahai Girls Inter-College
- Silver Oak Academy
- Ch. Gyan Singh Krishak Higher Secondary School, Station Road Bilari
- Ujjwal Shiksha Modern Public School, Station Road Bilari
- SBS School
- Kamlanand Saraswati Vidhya Mandir
- De Paul school
- R.P.V.M Inter College
- Anand Saraswati Vidhya Mandir, Mill

== Degree College ==
- Royal Degree College
- Gramodaya Mahavidhyalya
- Hari Mangal Mahavidhyalya
- M.H.Memorial Degree College
- Jevan Lakshya Degree College

== Printing Press & Cyber Cafe ==
- Dinesh Printing Press
- Gul Printers
- Ashu CSC & Cyber Cafe
- SP common Service centre Dhakia naroo
- Manyawar Shri Kanshiram Ji CSC Station Road Bilari
