= Mohd Nasir Qureshi =

Indian politician

Member of the Uttar Pradesh Legislative Assembly
- Incumbent
- Assumed office March 2022
- Constituency: Moradabad Rural

Personal details
- Born: Mohd Nasir Qureshi
- Party: Samajwadi Party
- Occupation: Politician

Mohd Nasir is an Indian politician. He is a member of the 18th Uttar Pradesh Assembly representing the Moradabad Rural constituency as a member of the Samajwadi Party.
