= Barhapur Assembly constituency =

Constituency of the Uttar Pradesh legislative assembly in India

Barhapur
- Constituency No. 19 for the Uttar Pradesh Legislative Assembly

Constituency details
- Country: India
- Region: North India
- State: Uttar Pradesh
- District: Bijnor
- Total electors: 338,100 (2017)
- Reservation: None

Member of Legislative Assembly
- 18th Uttar Pradesh Legislative Assembly
- Incumbent Kunwar Sushant Singh
- Party: Bharatiya Janata Party
- Elected year: 2008

Barhapur is one of the 403 constituencies of the Uttar Pradesh Legislative Assembly, India. It is a part of the Bijnor district and one of the five assembly constituencies in the Moradabad Lok Sabha constituency. The first election in this assembly constituency was held in 2012 after the "Delimitation of Parliamentary and Assembly Constituencies Order, 2008" was passed in the year 2008.

== Wards / Areas ==
The extent of Barhapur Assembly constituency is KCs Barhapur, Pureni, Barhapur NP of Nagina Tehsil; KCs Kadrabad, Afzalgarh & Afzalgarh M.B. of Dhampur Tehsil.

== Members of the Legislative Assembly ==
Election	Name	Party
Till 2012 : Constituency did not exist
2012	Mohammad Ghazi	Bahujan Samaj Party
2017	Kunwar Sushant Singh	Bharatiya Janata Party
2022	Kunwar Sushant Singh	Bharatiya Janata Party

== Election results ==
=== 2027 ===
2027 Uttar Pradesh Legislative Assembly election: Barhapur
Party	Candidate	Votes	%	±%
INDIA				
NDA				
BSP	Tanya Nagpal			
NOTA	None of the above			
Majority				
Turnout				
gain from		Swing		

=== 2022 ===
2022 Uttar Pradesh Legislative Assembly election: Barhapur
Party	Candidate	Votes	%	±%
BJP	Kunwar Sushant Singh	100,100	41.58	+6.13
SP	Kapil Kumar	85,755	35.62	
BSP	Mohammad Ghazi	46,638	19.37	−3.45
NOTA	None of the above	849	0.35	+0.1
Majority		14,345	5.96	+1.53
Turnout		240,760	67.05	+1.34
BJP hold		Swing		

=== 2017 ===
2017: Barhapur
Party	Candidate	Votes	%	±%
BJP	Kunwar Sushant Singh	78,744	35.45	
INC	Husain Ahmad	68,920	31.02	
BSP	Fahad Yazdani	50,684	22.82	
Independent	Indradev Singh	6,190	2.79	
RLD	Radha Singh	3,449	1.55	
Independent	Kulveer Singh	3,164	1.42	
NOTA	None of the above	556	0.25	
Majority		9,824	4.43	
Turnout		222,149	65.71	
BJP gain from INC		Swing		

== See also ==
- Moradabad Lok Sabha constituency
- Bijnor district
- List of constituencies of the Uttar Pradesh Legislative Assembly
