= Thakurdwara =

- Town
- Nickname: Thakragarh
- Location in Uttar Pradesh, India
- Coordinates: 29.19°N 78.86°E
- Country: India
- State: Uttar Pradesh
- District: Moradabad
- Established: 1945
- Founder: Thakur Sahab

Government
  - Type: Indian
  - MLA: Nawab Jaan Khan
  - Rank: 14
- Elevation: 315 m (1,033 ft)

Population (2011)
  - Total: 4,875

Languages
  - Official: Hindi
  - Additional official: Urdu
- Time zone: UTC+5:30 (IST)
- PIN: 244 601
- Telephone code: 0591
- Vehicle registration: UP 21, UK 06, HT 12

Thakurdwara is a town in Moradabad district in the indian state of Uttar Pradesh.

== Location ==
Thakurdwara is 15 km from Kashipur. The township has been very large part of erstwhile UP and now a thriving in the north of Uttar Pradesh.

== Geography ==
Thakurdwara is located at 29.19°N 78.86°E. The city is situated on Ramnagar-Kashipur-Moradabad Road. Thakurdwara is at just 12 km distance from Kashipur, 48 km distance from its District Main City Moradabad, 218 km distance from National Capital New Delhi and 411 km distance from Awadh Capital Lucknow.

== Tourism ==
The world famous Jim Corbett National Park is just 52 km away from it. The Ramganga Dam(Kalagarh Dam) is 46 km away.

== Infrastructure and Transport ==
The town's nearest Railway Station is Kashipur, Uttarakhand (12 km). The nearest International Airport is Indira Gandhi International Airport, New Delhi, 218 km away. Another near Airport is 72 km away at Pantnagar. But the airport has only single flight on Fri, Sat, Sun, Wed for New Delhi operated by Alliance Air (India).

== Demographics ==
As of 2011 India census, Thakurdwara had a population of 4875. Males constitute 52% of the population and females 48%. Thakurdwara has an average literacy rate of 78%, higher than the national average of 85%: male literacy is 89%, and female literacy is 80%. In Thakurdwara, 11% of the population is under 6 years of age.

== Industry ==
Major sources of income of Thakurdwara are -

- Agriculture,
- Handloom.

Pasupati Acrylon Limited is spread over an area of approximately 90 acres. Pasupati Acrylon has a manufacturing capacity of 42000 MT/Annum of Acrylic fibre. Pasupati Acrylon supplies its Acrylic fiber under the brand name ‘ACRYLON'.

== Notable people ==
- Nawab Jan is an Indian politician and a member of the 16th Legislative Assembly of Uttar Pradesh and 17th Legislative Assembly of Uttar Pradesh, India. He represents the Thakurdwara constituency of Uttar Pradesh and is a member of the Samajwadi Party political party.
- Ajay Pratap Singh - 2022 Assembly-26 MLA candidate, has held the post of BJYM District Vice President.
- Kunwar Sarvesh Kumar Singh (also known as Rakesh Singh, 22 December 1952 – 20 April 2024), was an Indian businessman who served as the Member of Parliament from Moradabad, Uttar Pradesh. He was a five-term MLA from Thakurdwara from 1991 to 2007 and 2012 to 2014 till he was elected as MP from Moradabad Lok Sabha General Election in 2014
