= Kanth, Moradabad =

Kanth Bandage city Garments Hub
- Town
- Location within Uttar Pradesh Location within India
- Coordinates: 29.059°N 78.628°E
- Country: India
- State: Uttar Pradesh
- District: Moradabad
- Established: 1625
- Founder: Kunwar sahab
- Named for: kant baks

Government
  - Type: city
  - Body: Tehsil

Area
  - Total: 100 km^{2} (39 sq mi)
  - Rank: 3
- Elevation: 252 m (827 ft)

Population (2011)
  - Total: 26,381
  - Rank: 4
  - Density: 260/km^{2} (680/sq mi)

Languages
  - Official: Hindi, Urdu, English
- Time zone: UTC+5:30 (IST)
- 0591: 244501
- Vehicle registration: U.P 21
- Website: www.moradabad.nic.in

Kanth is a Nagar Palika Parishad in Moradabad district in the Indian state of Uttar Pradesh. It is home to small-scale bandage manufacturing industries. These are sold in Uttar Pradesh and in the rest of India under various licenses. Recently, manufacturing of ready-made garments has also developed, contributing to the economy of the town.

== Geography ==
Kanth is on the right bank of the river Ramganga, 655 feet (200 m) above sea level, and has a railway station on the Oudh and Rohilkhand Railway, 868 miles (1,397 km) from Calcutta. Kanth is on the road from Dhampur to Moradabad, and is well connected with U.P. Roadways Bus Service, as well as by rail.

== Demographics ==
Religions in Kanth
| Religion | Percent |
| Muslims | 55.60% |
| Hindus | 43.39% |
| Christians | 0.39% |
| Sikhs | 0.31% |
| Others† | 0.1% |
Distribution of religions †Includes Jains (0.03%), Buddhists (0.03%).

As of 2011 India census, Kanth had a population of 26,381. Male population is 13,757 and female population is 12,624. Kanth has an average literacy rate of 73.67%, higher than the state average of 67.68%. Male literacy is 80.60%, and female literacy is 66.08%.

== Education ==
Kanth is home to the D.S.M. degree college. Majority of the schools in Kanth are Hindi medium and affiliated to UP Board, prominent among them are D.S.M. Inter College, Dayanand Bal Mandir, Maharishi Dayanand Inter College, Rehbar E Aam Muslim inter college, Bihari Adarsh Kanya Inter College, Public Inter College, Har kumar sing girls college (Now Closed or converted into banquet hall, marriage hall). Few English medium schools in Kanth includes R.S.Nain Memorial Public School, St Mary's convent, delhi children academy, J.P. Sharda (Now closed or converted into E-rikshaw factory) and KC Public school, G.K. Computer Institute (G.K.Educational Welfare Society), MBD public school.

== Religious activities ==
Shiv Mandir, Moni Mandir, Bhood Mandir, Sant Ravidas Dharamshala and kali Mandir are few religious Hindu shrines. Bhagvaan Balmiki Mandir Kanth also has Ramleela ground, also known as Raamleela Rang Mancha, it is used for Ramayana play every year before Dusheera. Kanth also has many mosques for Muslim worshippers such as Masjid Banjaaran (Markaj Tableeg Jaamat), Masjid Ansaryan, Jama masjid, Qazyan masjid, Sunhri masjid, Chapper Wali Masjid, Madina masjid Thandi Masjid, Lal Masjid, Gulzar Masjid, Aysha Masjid, Moti Masjid, Mahigiyran Masjid, Mohammadi Masjid. Kanth also has one gurudwara for Sikh worshippers and it is named Shri Gurudwara singh sabha.
