= Moradabad district =

- District of Uttar Pradesh
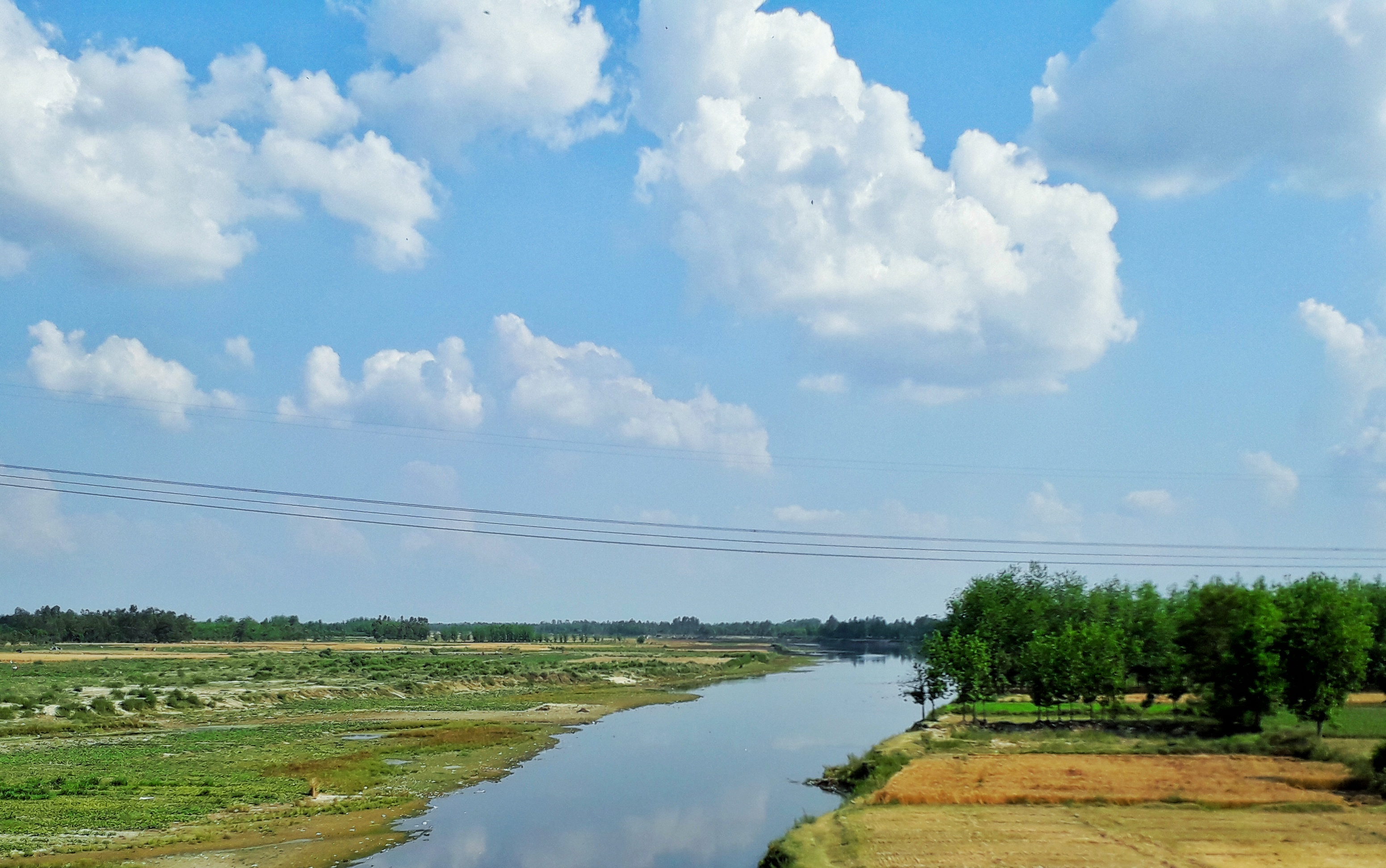
- Ramganga at Moradabad

- Location of Moradabad district in Uttar Pradesh
- Coordinates (Moradabad): 28.84°N 78.76°E
- Country: India
- State: Uttar Pradesh
- Division: Moradabad
- Headquarters: Moradabad

Government
  - Lok Sabha constituencies: Moradabad
  - Vidhan Sabha constituencies: Barhapur; Kanth; Thakurdwara; Moradabad Rural; Moradabad Nagar

Area
  - Total: 1,264.7 km^{2} (488.3 sq mi)

Population (2011)
  - Total: 3,126,507
  - Density: 2,472.1/km^{2} (6,402.8/sq mi)

Demographics
  - Literacy: 58.67 per cent
- Time zone: UTC+05:30 (IST)
- Website: moradabad.nic.in

Moradabad district (Hindi pronunciation: [mʊɾaːd̪aːbaːd̪]) is one of the districts of Uttar Pradesh, India. The city of Moradabad is the district headquarters. Moradabad district is part of Moradabad division. It used to be the second most populous district of Uttar Pradesh out of 75 after Prayagraj till a new district Sambhal was carved out of it in 2011.

The district of Moradabad lies between 28°21´ to 28°16´ north latitude and 78°4´ to 79° east longitude.

== Demographics ==
Historical population
Year	Pop.	±% p.a.
1901	854,603	—
1911	905,439	+0.58%
1921	859,151	−0.52%
1931	920,336	+0.69%
1941	1,055,828	+1.38%
1951	1,190,434	+1.21%
1961	1,423,487	+1.80%
1971	1,747,420	+2.07%
1981	2,257,867	+2.60%
1991	2,965,293	+2.76%
2001	3,810,983	+2.54%
2011	4,772,006	+2.27%

According to the 2011 census, Moradabad district has a population of 4,772,006, roughly equal to the nation of Singapore or the US state of Alabama. This gives it a ranking of 26th among India's 640 districts. The district has a population density of 1,284 inhabitants per square kilometre (3,330/sq mi). Its population growth rate over the decade 2001-2011 was 25.25%. Moradabad has a sex ratio of 903 females for every 1000 males, and a literacy rate of 58.67%.

After bifurcation, the residual Moradabad district has a population of 3,126,507 and a sex ratio of 910 females per 1000 males. 1,156,525 (36.99%) lived in urban areas. Scheduled Castes make up 436,149 (13.95%) of the population.

=== Religions ===
Religions in residual Moradabad district (2011)
Religion	Percent
Islam	50.80%
Hinduism	48.32%
Other or not stated	0.88%
Distribution of religions

After the separation of Sambhal district in 2013, Moradabad district became the second Muslim-majority district of Uttar Pradesh after Rampur.

Religions in Moradabad by tehsil (2011)
Tehsils	Muslims	Hindus	Others
Thakurdwara	54.53%	44.83%	0.64%
Kanth	44.95%	54.28%	0.77%
Moradabad	51.17%	47.73%	1.10%
Bilari	49.72%	49.73%	0.55%

=== Languages ===
Languages of Moradabad district (2011)
1. Hindi (82.5%)
2. Urdu (17.3%)
3. Others (0.20%)

At the 2011 Census of India, 82.48% of the population of the residual district spoke Hindi and 17.32% Urdu as their first language. The dialect spoken in the region is Khari Boli.

== History ==
=== Delhi Sultanate Era (14th–16th century) ===
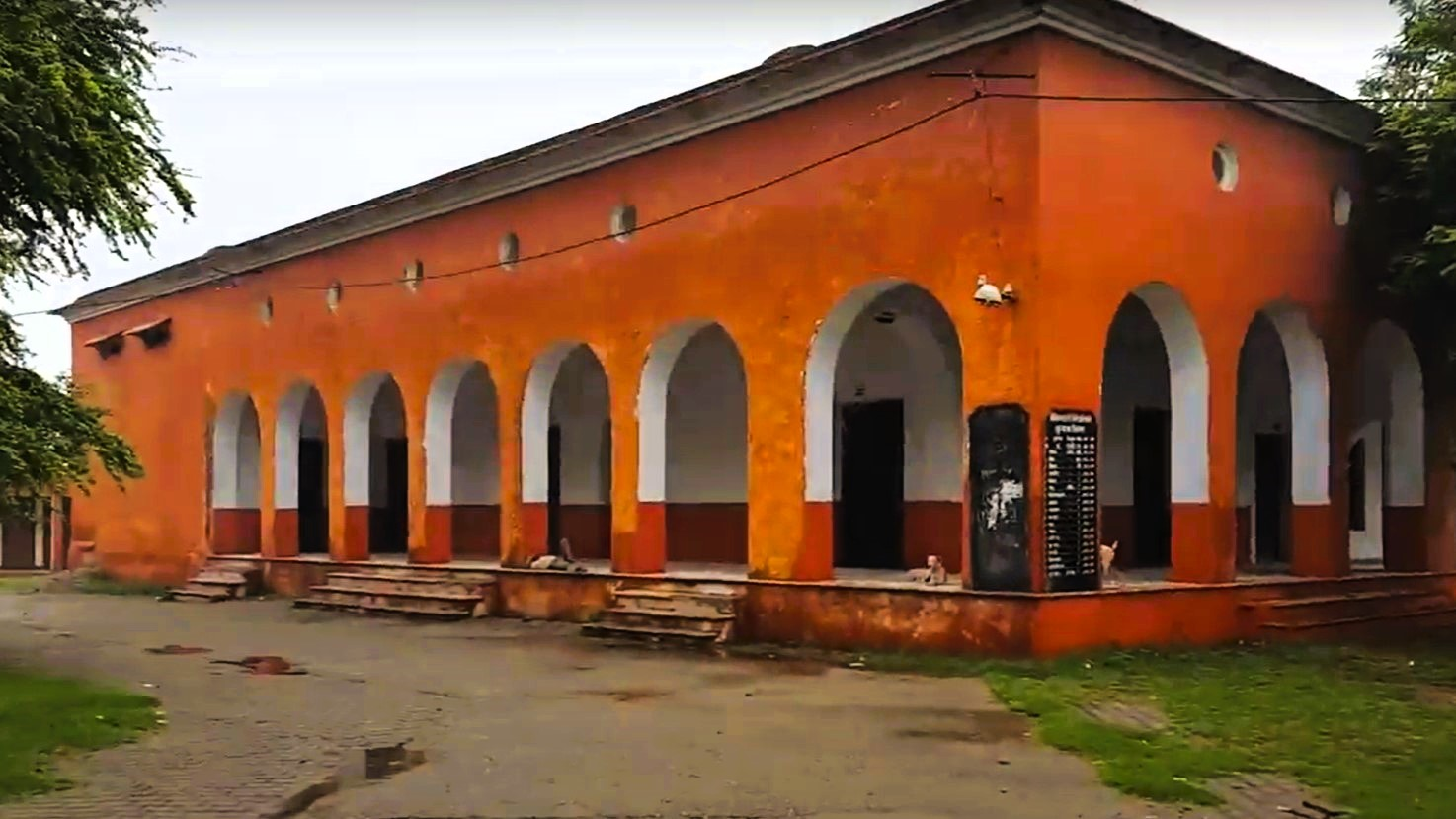
Government Inter College of Moradabad, which once used to be a fort of Katehria Rajputs

Moradabad's known history begins from the 14th century, when it was part of the territory to the east of Ramganga river known as Katehr. The region consisted all of Moradabad, Rampur, and while most of it was jungle at the time, it was a stronghold of the Katehria Rajputs, who used to live in tribes. Little is known about who the Katehrias were and how they came to this region. British administration believed that:

- Either they were part of the various Rajput tribes that first colonized the area in 11th century, but were probably known by some other name because no mention of the Katehrias is found in the administrative or cultural texts from that period
- Or they migrated from the western parts of Ganga into the jungles of Katehr because of the excesses and hostilities of Muslim rulers such as Muhammad Ghori, Qutb ud-Din Aibak, and Nasiruddin Mahmud Shah.

The Katehrias were known for insurrections against Muslim rulers. As a result, they were targeted ruthlessly by the rulers and their generals, who tried to make sure that no inhabitant remained in the region. However, the Katehrias used to hide in the jungles and were never completely eliminated. Until the first quarter of 15th century, the whole of Katehr region was ravaged multiple times by almost all sultans of the Delhi Sultanate in revenge of the insurrections and surprise attacks done by Katehria Rajputs. The cycle ended only in 1424 after the death of Khizr Khan, the son of Alauddin Khilji, and subjection of Har Singh, a leader of Katehria Rajputs. After that the long-harassed region remained in peace for at least two centuries.

=== Mughal era (16th–18th century) ===
==== Sher Shah Suri's conquest (1539–1555) ====
The Delhi Sultanate fell to Mughal Empire and its last Sultan Ibrahim Khan Lodi was defeated at the hands of Babur in 1526. With this, the way was paved for Katehr's entry to Mughal empire. Before his death in 1530, Babur dispatched his son Humayun with a large army to Sambhal to bring the region under their control. The mission was successful, though Humayun's reign was short-lived as he lost to Sher Shah Suri of Sur Empire in Battle of Chausa in 1539.

However, the reign of Suri empire was also short-lived as after the death of Islam Shah suri, successor of Sher Shah, a succession war broke out in the Suri empire and three rivals to the throne (Muhammad Adil Shah, his brother-in-law Ibrahim Shah Suri, and Sikandar Shah Suri) started fighting with each other. This helped Katehrias regain much of their lost power, and in 1554 they had possession not only of their regional stronghold Rampur but also of Bareilly and Chaupala (modern day Moradabad city). The succession war also provided an opportunity to Humayun to regain his lost territory, and he won it under the leadership of Bairam Khan in Battle of Sirhind on 22 June 1555. Bairam Khan, however, put another noble from Sher Shah's darbar named Isa Khan in charge of Sambhal as the latter had saved his life from Nasir Khan after Sher Shah's conquest.

Isa Khan was a capable administrator, who convinced Katehrias to cut down their jungles, repressed crime in the region, and imposed a revenue on them for the first time "according to the measurements". These reforms had a beneficial impact on the region and were also appropriated by Akbar during his reign.

==== Akbar and his successors ====
During Akbar's reign, the sarkar of Sambhal consisted 20 parganas of Moradabad district. One among them was the Mughalpur pargna consisting of Thakurdwara and Chaupala (it is mentioned in the Ain-i-Akbari). It produced a revenue of 1,340,812 dams for the imperial treasury and it provided a force of 500 infantry and 100 cavalry to the Mughal army, while the cultivated area was 101,619 bighas. Although the territory was under Bairam Khan since the time of his father, Akbar appointed Ali Quli Khan as its administrator. Ali Quli cleared the region of Afghans before being appointed as governor to Jaunpur. Akbar ruled on the region by appointing governors who had their agency, and the last governor appointed by him was Mirza Ali Beg.

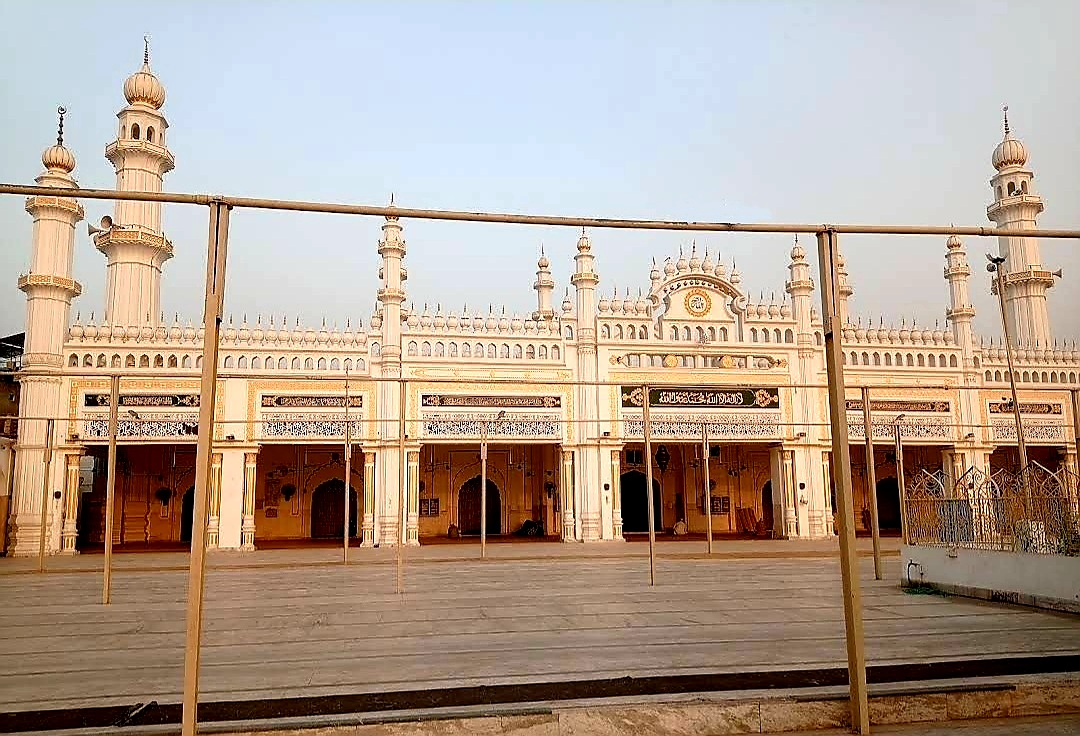
Jama Masjid built by Rustam Khan, the governor of Shah Jahan, on the banks of Ramganga river

Almost no other major historical developments took place in the region during the reign of Akbar and his successors, Jahangir as well as Shah Jahan. However, that changed in 1624 when Raja Ram Singh, a Katehria leader who used to live in the jungles of Rampur, invaded the Tarai region. The raja of Kumaon complained about it to Shah Jahan, who then sent his general Rustam Khan Dakhani to deal with the disturbance. Rustam Khan captured Chaupala, put Ramsukh to death, and refounded the city as Rustamnagar. He built a new fort and the great mosque (Jama Masjid) on the banks of Ramganga river, which was the first Jama Masjid built on the banks of a river.

Shah Jahan, however, was not very pleased with Rustam Khan's actions. He summoned Rustam to his darbar and asked him to explain why he exceeded his instructions, and also the name that he had given to the new town. With great presence of mind, Rustam said that he has called it Muradabad in honour of Shah Jahan's young prince Murad Bakhsh. The emperor was satisfied, and he allowed Rustam Khan to govern the new town. Rustan Khan died in the Battle of Samugarh in 1658, post which a number of governors were appointed to the region.

There were some disturbances and uprisings in the region against Mughal rule in 1716 after the death of Bahadur Shah I, but they were swiftly repressed by the governors of those times. One governor of Kashmiri origin (Muhammad Murad) who had received the title of Rukn-ud-Daula even changed its name to Ruknabad and made it into a district suba in 1718, but that arrangement was short-lived as he was deprived of his office by Farrukhsiyar in 1719. The last Mughal governor of Moradabad was Sheikh Azmatullah of Lucknow, before the region came under Rohilla rule.

==== Rohillas (1742–1774) ====
In 1730s many people of various Afghan tribes were coming to India in search of service from Afghanistan. These people, though belonging to different tribes, were collectively known as Rohillas. They were settling in the Katehr region in large numbers, where they used to get employment as mercenaries for Mughal generals. One among them was Ali Mohammed Khan, who had acquired considerable estate in the region under patronage of governor Sheikh Azmatullah. In 1737, when Azmatullah took an expedition to Jansath, the stronghold of Barha Saiyids in Muzaffarnagar, Ali Mohammed joined him. He had by then built an army of thousands of mercenaries by inducting most of the Rohillas who used to arrive in the region. Nader Shah's invasion of Afghanistan, which forced more afghans to flee from their homeland, also helped his cause.

The Jansath expedition was a success, and that earned Ali Mohammed the title of Nawab from Sheikh Azmatullah. However, the increasing aggressiveness of Ali Mohammed led to an order being given by Mughal emperor Aurangzeb in 1742 to Raja Harnand, the Khattri governor of Moradabad, to expel the Rohillas from Katehr. This was, however, easier said than done. As Raja Harnand was waiting for astrologers with an army of 50,000 men (which also consisted the army of Bareilly's governor Abd-un-Nabi) in Bilari, Ali Mohammed attacked him with 12,000 Rohillas at night and the Mughal army was completely routed. Both governors (Raja Harnand as well as Abd-un-Nabi) were slain, and Ali Mohammed seized control of Sambhal, Moradabad, as well as Amroha and Bareilly. Though Wazir Qamr-ud-din sent his son Mir Mannu with an army to chastise the rebels, Rohillas convinced him to come to an agreement under which Ali Mohammed agreed to pay a fixed tribute to the Wazir every year, and married his daughter with a large dowry to Wazir's son. In turn, he was recognized as the Nawab of Rohilkhand.

Rohillas quickly expanded their territory beyond the regions they had conquered, and as a result they soon came into conflict with his neighbor, the powerful Nawab Safdar Jang of Oudh state. Now Ali Mohammed was once again facing the Mughal army, this time commanded by Emperor Muhammad Shah in person. They forced him to surrender, and in 1746 he was taken prisoner to Delhi. He was kept under close surveillance for six months, until Hafiz Rahmat Khan arrived with an army of 6,000 to demand his release. A compromise was effected, under which Ali Mohammed had to give two of his sons (Abdullah and Faizullah) as hostages to the emperor while he himself was freed and sent as a governor to Sirhind.

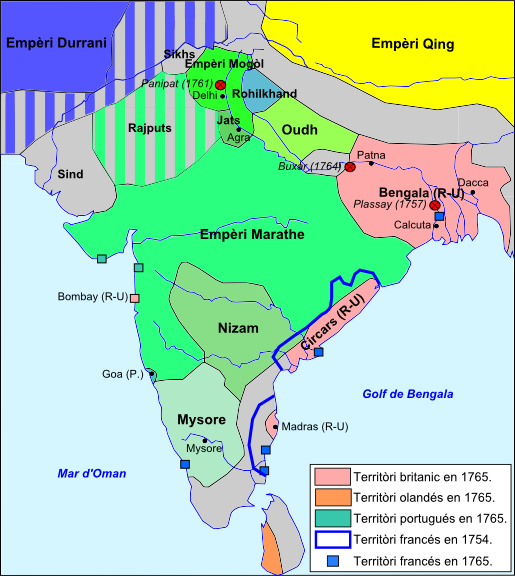
Rohilkhand state in 1765 (near Oudh), which consisted all of Moradabad district

Ali Mohammed's surrender brought Moradabd again under the imperial administration of Mughal empire. Azmatullah put his son Fariduddin in charge of the administrative affairs, while Safdar Jang's forces set out on the mission to evict Rohillas from the Tarai region. However, Rohillas were not easily suppressed. They raided Moradabad and killed Fariduddin, post-which Raja Chhattarbhoj took his place as governor of Moradabad. But once Ahmad Shah Abdali invaded in 1748, Ali Mohammed returned to the region from Sirhind and expelled Chhatarbhoj, repossessing Moradabad. He was confirmed as the legitimate ruler of region by Ahmad Shah Abdali, and he evicted all the zamidars, including Thakur Mahendra Singh of Thakurdwara, to consolidate his power. Ali Mohammed died on 14 September 1748, and in the absence of his sons Hafiz Rehmat Khan was appointed as his successor by a council of nobles with Dunde Khan, the cousin of Ali Mohammed, as commander-in-chief.

=== War with Oudh state ===
Ali Mohammed's death came as an opportunity for Safdar Jang to take another shot at capturing Rohilkhand. He first induced Nawab Qaim Khan of Farrukhabad to attack Rohillas, but that didn't work out as Rohillas killed him near Budaun. Then Safdar Jang made another attempt by joining forces with Marathas, and since Rohilla forces were already involved in another conflict with Pathans of Farrukhabad after killing Qaim Khan, they had to retreat through Moradabad and Kashipur all the way to the hills of Garhwal. However, even there they were blockaded for a long time by the army of Marathas and Safdar Jang. The relief came only after Ahmad Shah Abdali's invasion in 1752, which forced all three sides to make peace. Rohillas were compelled to sign a bond promising to pay an indemnity of 50 lakhs and an annual tribute of 5 lakhs to the emperor, and the bond was handed to Marathas for compensation, and Rahmat Khan was confirmed in his possessions of Rohilkhand. Marathas, however, were never paid, which became the basis of their future claims on Rohilkhand.

Things complicated once again, however, on the reappearance of Ali Mohammed's sons Sadullah and Allah Yar Khan, who were kept hostages by Ahmed Shah Abdali. An arrangement was devised under which various divisions of the Rohilkhand state were jointly assigned to two brothers, with Moradabad going to Nawab Saadullah Khan and Allah Yar Khan. However, this arrangement was mere optics as real power was still vested in Dunde Khan, the commander-in-chief. Dunde Khan assumed power from Rahmat Khan when he saw another partition of the state being effected, and as a result both sons of Ali Mohammed didn't get their rightful possessions.

When war ensued between Najib-ad-Daula and Marathas in 1759, Rahmat Khan and Shuja-ud-Daula of Oudh state (who had succeeded Safdar Jang) came to his rescue. Loss of Marathas in the Third Battle of Panipat with Ahmed Shah Abdali also provided a pretext for truce, in which Dunde Khan and Rahmat Khan's son Inayat Khan had also participated. After Dunde Khan's death in 1770 the Rohilla power declined, and in 1772 Marathas again invaded the region with great force, driving Zabita Khan (son of Najib-ad-Daulah) in flight to Rampur. They withdrew only on the approach of Shuja-ud-Daulah accompanied by the English contingent of Sir Robert Barker. A treaty was signed on 15 June 1772, in which Shuja-ud-Daula promised to drive Marathas out of the Rohilkhand region in exchange of a payment of 40 lakhs. He kept his part of the promise by bringing a larger force in November 1772 with a brigade of East India Company's troops under Colonel Alexander Champion. When retreating, Marathas fell upon Sambhal and Moradabad and plundered both of the regions, laying them waste and retiring through the Ganges.

After keeping his promise Shuja-ud-Daula demanded his payment of 40 lakhs from the Rohillas. However, Hafiz Rahmat Khan reneged on the promise. His reasoning was that Marathas had retreated on their own, and English or Oudh troops hadn't done anything significant for it to receive any payment. This became a cause of war with Oudh state, and Shuja-ud-Daula started ceasing Rohilla possessions and bringing other Rohilla leaders (included sons of Dunde Khan, who still held Moradabad) under his influence. By 1774, Rahmat Khan found himself cornered and unsupported, and he died at the hands of Oudh and English troops on 23 April 1774 in the Battle of Miranpur Katra. A compromise was effected in October the same year, under which jagir of Rampur was given to Nawab Faizullah and rest of the Rohilkhand state (including Moradabad) went to Nawab Shuja-ud-Daula.

=== Oudh rule (Late 18th century) ===
Under Oudh rule Rohilkhand was divided into three districts: Bareilly, Budaun, and Moradabad. The Moradabad district was first assigned to Asalat Khan, under whose rule it felt a respite from the constant state of war at which it was. However, his successors were mere "farmers of the revenue" who used to sublease the region to the highest bidder to extract as much from it in as little time as possible. The lessors then used to extract whatever they could have extracted from the farmers of the region. Crime was high, and thousands of cultivators had migrated to nearby Rampur and there was no security of life or property in the region.

=== British era (19th century–20th century) ===
The sorry state of affairs ended temporarily in 1801 when Oudh state's ruler Shuja-ud-Daula ceded the region to British East India Company for extinction of the debts he had incurred by maintaining English troops in his dominion. Under British administration it was made the headquarters of a collectorate and first collector appointed in charge was Mr. W Leycester. The transition was largely peaceful, but the sufferings of people only increased, largely because of the ignorance of Company officers towards the landholding class of this district. Unscrupulous revenue officers who had access to revenue records took advantage of this ignorance by siding with landowners.

Things worsened further when Company government introduced the First Settlement system under which land was to be leased to highest bidders for cultivation. This settlement scheme led to armed conflict, as landholders (zamindars) in the district used force to retain the possession of their lands from speculators and bidders. Lack of rains between 1803–04 and subsequent raids of Amir Khan further worsened district's prosperity.

==== Amir Khan's raids ====
In 1805 during the siege of Bharatpur by British forces, the Maratha empire's general Yashwantrao Holkar tried to create a diversion by creating disturbance in Rohilkhand. He chose Amir Khan from Sambhal (who later became the Nawab of Tonk) for the task. Amir Khan's grandfather and father had served Ali Mohammed and Dunde Khan, respectively.

Amir drove with his force of Pindaris rapidly to Moradabad, where he faced resistance from the British forces under Leycester who had taken his position in the cutcherry recently built by him. Amir didn't try to storm the cutcherry, probably because it was fortified and also had two field-guns on the roof, but he levied contributions from the public to the tune of 3 lakhs. He also destroyed European houses and police lines, and tried to capture the government treasure unsuccessfully. Ultimately, however, he was driven off by the forces of General Smith and Lord Metcalfe.

==== The Mutiny of 1857 ====
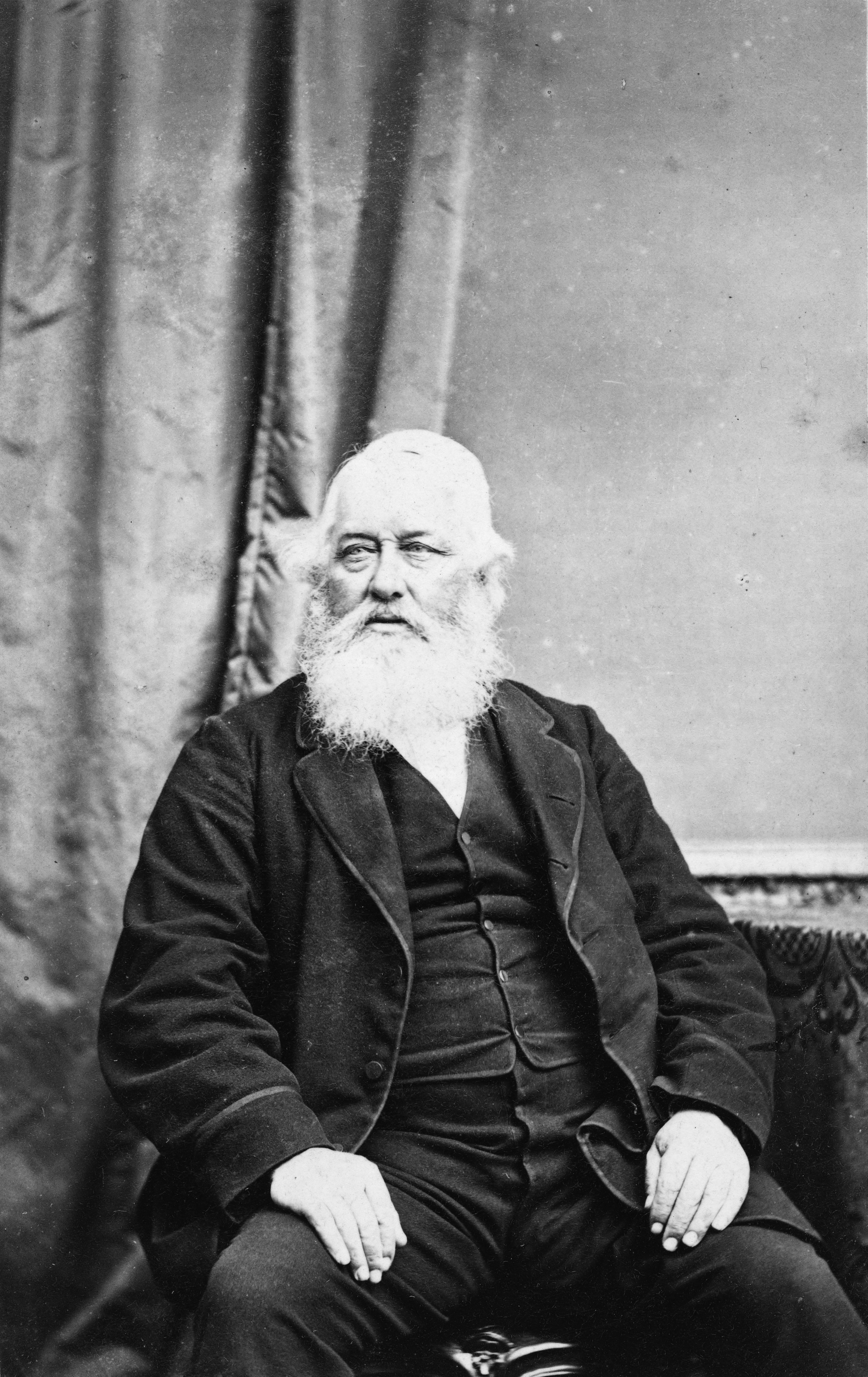
Mr. JC Wilson, the collector of Moradabad during rebellion of 1857

By the Company government faced sepoy mutiny of 1857 led by Freedom fighter Mangal Pandey, the environment in Moradabad was also not very favorable for the English. Landholders were harassed because of the new land laws introduced by the British, and common man was also suffering because of low wages. So when the news of a rebellion in Meeruth reached Moradabad, it was bound to create ripples in the society. The Company officers were aware of this, so Mr. John Cracoft Wilson, the collector of the district, harangued the men of 29th Native Infantry that was guarding the district to gauge their response, which seemed favorable at the moment. He also asked Nawab Yusuf Ali Khan of Rampur to send 300 irregular horses to hold the road between Meerut and Bulandshahar. But before it could have arrived, it was heard on 15 May that a party of the Mutinous 20th Native Infantry had crossed the Ganges River and was camping on the banks of Gangan river in Moradabad.

Sensing the gravity of situation, Mr. Wilson, magistrate Mr. CB Saunders, and Civil Surgeon Dr. Cannon went with a company of 29th Infantry to confront the rebels. They killed one of them and captured eight, recovering from them the treasure of Muzaffarnagar. The recovered treasure and captured rebels were placed on elephants, and Mr. Wilson sent them to Meerut with Mr. Saunders while he himself returned to Moradabad.

Three days later, on 19 May, five rebels entered the Moradabad cantonment, three of whom were seized by a Sikh sentry while one was shot dead in the lines. The shot rebel, however, was the brother-in-law of a sepoy named Sansar Singh from the 29th Native Infantry. In addition to that, due to some error the man killed a night before on the banks of Gangan along with 8 captured rebels also had also been brought to the Moradabad jail instead of being taken to Meerut, as intended by Mr. Wilson. These two things instigated the 29th Infantry as well, and they broke open the jail, releasing all of the 170 prisoners along with all the sepoys. All of them were later captured, however.

On 21 May news broke that some people from Rampur, led by Maulvi Mannu of Rampur, had hoisted a green flag on the banks of Ramganga river. It was also heard that they are in communication with rebels of Moradabad as well. Mr. Wilson once again went ahead with a company of the 29th Native Infantry to confront them, killing most of them including Maulvi Mannu. There was a state of anarchy in the district and freedom fighters were targeting English officers by looting and plundering their homes and offices. Most of the people targeted in these attacks were either the new landowners created by English laws or the oppressive revenue department officials such as munsifs, patwaris, muqaddams and magistrates regardless of their religious affiliation.

On 2 June the news of Mutiny in Bareilly came to Moradabad, and its effect was instantaneous: the sepoys of 29th infantry derided the order to march into Meerut, and the next day they took control of the treasury containing Rs. 270,000. The district officers and their wives had to leave the city for Meerut, and military officers with their families had to leave for Nainital. Those who remained in the city paid for it with their lives. Nawab Majju Khan, a descendent of Sheikh Azmatullah, was appointed new governor of Moradabad and although Dunde Khan's family member Asad Ali Khan tried to dispute his position, he was unsuccessful in doing so.

On 4 June Nawab Yusuf Ali Khan of Rampur, who was siding with British, sent his uncle Abdul Ali Khan to take possession of Moradabad. He himself also arrived two days later, but looking at the environment and mood among the rebels he wasn't able to oust Majju Ali Khan from his position. Ultimately, he appointed Majju as the nazim of city, with some other rebels being given minor posts in the government and went back to Rampur. But when his troops returned to Rampur two days later (on 8 June) to protect their state against the mutineers of Bareilly (i.e. Bareilly Brigade), Majju Khan was once again able to assert himself.

When the Bareilly Brigade led by Bakht Khan arrived in Moradabad on 14 June, it led to a situation of factionalism as Bakht Khan accused Majju of sparing and protecting Christians. He impeached Majju Khan on the charge, and searched for English clerks in hiding. Many of them were discovered from the captivity and put to death immediately, while others were sent to Delhi where they met the same fate. The Bareilly Brigade departed three days later on 17th, and also took with itself the 29th Native Infantry. After that Majju Khan again took to the throne. He was, however, challenged shortly afterwards by Asad Ali Khan who showed him an order of his appointment as Moradabad's governor by Bakht Khan. This further increased factionalism among the rebels, but ultimately Majju Khan emerged supreme.

On 23 June, however, Nawab of Rampur again took possession of Moradabad by sending Abdul Ali Khan with 2,000 men and four guns. This time, Majju Khan was deposed of his post but was allowed to call himself the nazim of Sambhal. He, however, resigned from the latter position himself. Abdul Ali Khan then rescued the British clerks and their families from captivity of Majju Khan, who in the words of Britishers had suffered "extreme privartion and indignity" in his prison. They were sent firstly to Rampur, from where they were ultimately taken to Meerut.

==== The Kaddu gardi incident ====
There was a general sentiment among people of Moradabad against the Nawab of Rampur and his troops who were in the city. On 29 June 1857, an argument erupted between some farmers of Moradabad and the men of Nawab-Rampur's army. The argument was over the purchase of a pumpkin (known as kaddu in Hindi), as the farmers refused to sell the pumpkin to a man of Rampur's army. The man then slapped the farmer, leading to a district-wide riot and violence. Order could be restored only after the intervention of Katghar's (an area that probably derives its name from Katehar) Dhaukal Singh, but 40 of Nawab-Rampur's men had died by then.

Although the authority of city rested with Abdul Ali Khan and Nawab-Rampur, their rule was little recognized in the city as there was anger and resentment in the public against everything English and everyone who was supporting the English. This was in contrast to other locations where the mutiny was limited only to troops and some lawless factions of the society. In Thakurdwara Tehsil people expelled their tehsildar, and Bilari tehsil was plundered by an army of mutineers. Sambhal and Chandausi tehsils were also looted by the villagers.

==== Firoz Shah's invasion and return of British authority ====
Nothing significant happened in 1857 after that, and the whole of Moradabad district remained under nominal control of Nawab-Rampur for 8 months with a state of anarchy. However, on 21 April 1858 Prince Firoz Shah of Delhi, led by an army of Khan Bahadur Khan, the grandson of Hafiz Rahmat Khan, arrived in Moradabad and overpowered the troops of Rampur. He, however, had to flee from the town as the Roorkee column of East India Company arrived in the city four days later and started capturing the rebels.

The Roorkee column searched for rebels across the city, and all of them were executed. Britishers created four hanging houses to hang and execute them, one each in the areas of Jigar Park, Shahbulla ki Ziyarat, Kachehri prison complex, and Gal Shaheed (which loosely translates to Martyr's street in English in honor of the freedom fighters who were martyred or became "shaheed"). Majju Khan was also captured and shot dead, with his dead body tied to the leg of an elephant and dragged around the city, before being hanged ultimately to a Tarmind tree in the graveyard of Galshaheed. Those who tried to take down the body from the tree were also shot dead and hanged from the same tree.

Other freedom fighters were also apprehended and slain in the same brutal manner to terrorize the people. Some prominent ones among them included:

- Maulvi Kifayat Ali Kafi, a poet and alim who rose to the rank of sadr in the government of Nawab Majju Ali Khan. He used to preach against the Britishers and issued a fatwa of jihad against them. He was executed by hanging.
- Nawab Shabbar Ali Khan, also a poet, and his associate Gulab, who were executed on the charges of attempting to murder an English officer. Shabbar Khan's property was also confiscated along with his zamindari.
- Munshi Imaamuddin from Sambhal, who had been employed in Akbar Shah II's court and was a supporter of Prince Feroz Shah, was thrown alive into a lime furnace with his property being confiscated.

On 30 April the district once again came under complete British control.

==== Civil disobedience and Mahatma Gandhi ====
In 1920 Mahatma Gandhi and other Congress leaders were planning their Civil Disobedience movement. During those days, the regional convention of North-East-West Frontier Province and Oudh State Congress was organized in Moradabad at Saroj Cinema. Many of the Congress stalwarts, including Mahatma Gandhi, Dr. Rajendra Prasad, Sarojini Naidu, Jawaharlal Nehru, Pandit Madan Mohan Malviya, and Annie Besant had come to Moradabad to attend it between 9 and 11 October 1920. A huge crowd had gathered to listen to Mahatma Gandhi, and it's said that the event played a pivotal role in shaping the Civil Disobedience movement. During the visit Gandhi also inaugurated the new building of Brij Ratan Hindu Public Library on Amroha Gate, which later served as a venue for the secret meetings of freedom fighters.

Later when the Civil Disobedience movement kicked off in 1932 and Britishers tried to repress it through brutal means, people of Moradabad organized large protests in the city which marked as a sign of public anger against unlawful detention of freedom fighters.

==== Quit India movement and violence at Pan Dariba ====
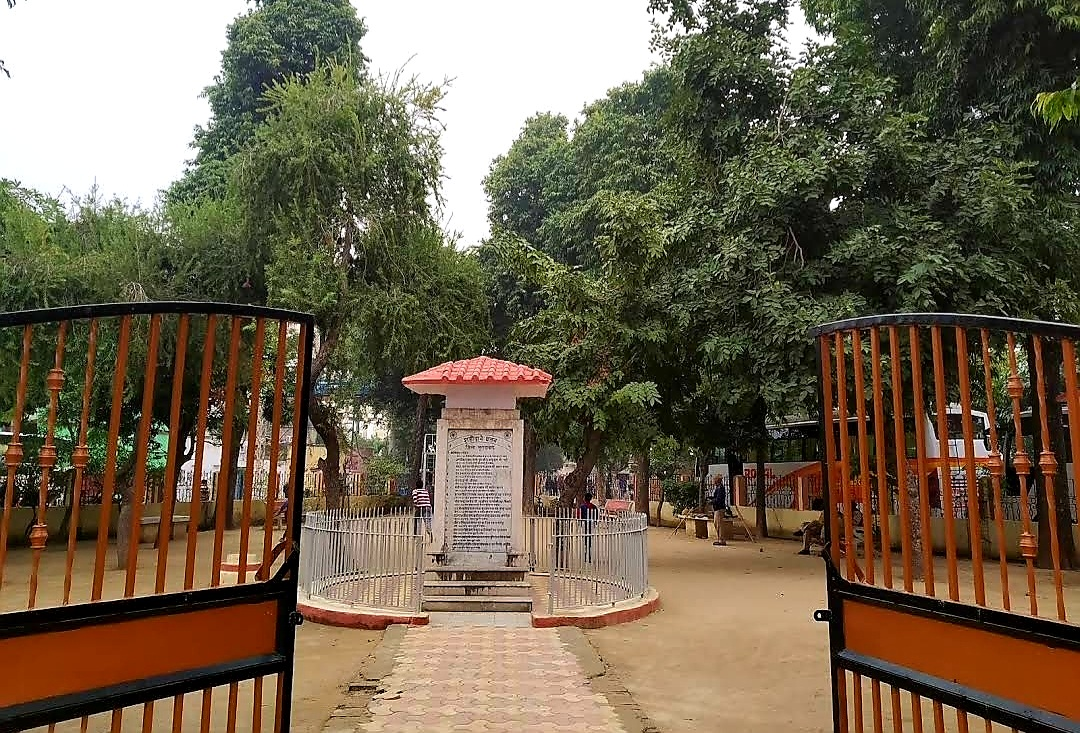
Shaheed Smarak Park in Civil Lines, Moradabad, to memorate all the freedom fighters who died in violence at Pan Dariba

When the Quit India movement was announced by Mahatma Gandhi on 9 August 1942, it was marked by violence in several parts of the country, including Moradabad. The Britishers started arresting freedom fighters across the country to minimize the impact of the movement, and they arrested many of them on the eve of 9th, including Congress leader Daudayaal Khanna.

When the news of Khanna's arrest spread in the city, the next day (on 10 August), people started gathering at Pan Dariba to take out a procession against the arrest of freedom fighters. The news of this gathering reached police officers, and they immediately reached Pan Dariba and started aerial firing. This enraged the protesters, who resorted to stone pelting. In turn, police started firing indiscriminately on the protesters, killing many of them and injuring more than 200. The martyrs also included an 11-year-old Jagdish Prasad Sharma, who was trying to hoist a flag on an electric pole.

The news of this violence further enraged people of the city. So on 11 August 1942, an even larger procession of more than 40,000 people was taken out all the way to the district court. The police again opened firing on it and the situation worsened quickly. British army had to be called, whose intervention led to death of 15 people, while 50 were injured and 154 arrested. The arrested people were also fined to the tune of Rs. 17,397. This enraged people and the next day they attacked Moradabad Railway Station and booking office.

=== Post-Independence Era (1947–present) ===
India got its independence on 15 August 1947, and since Moradabad was not a part of any princely states at that time, it immediately became part of the Independent India. Since then, the city and the district remained largely peaceful, except for the riots in 1980, which are considered the first major riots of Independent India.

The structure of the district remained largely the same even after independence, with Amroha, Sambhal, Thakurdwara, Bilari, and Kanth tehsils coming under its jurisdiction. On 15 April 1997 Amroha was carved out of Moradabad into a separate district, while on 28 September 2011, Sambhal was also carved out into another separate district.

== Administrative divisions ==
=== Electoral constituencies ===
There is one Lok Sabha constituencies for the district: Moradabad, which consists of Kanth, Thakurdwara, Moradabad Rural, Moradabad City and Barhapur (from Bijnor District).

For legislative elections Moradabad District is divided into six Vidhan Sabha constituencies:

1. Kanth
2. Thakurdwara
3. Moradabad Rural
4. Moradabad Nagar
5. Kundarki
6. Bilari

=== Zones and divisions ===
Moradabad District has one division: Moradabad Subdivision. There are five tehsils in Moradabad District and eight blocks.

- In Moradabad Subdivision there are three tehsils: Bilari Tehsil, Kanth Tehsil, Thakurdwara Tehsil; and there are five blocks: Kundarki, Chajlet, Bhagtpur, Dilari and Mundapandey.

== Towns and villages ==
In addition to the city of Moradabad, which is governed as a Municipal Corporation, there are four municipalities: Bahjoi, Bilari, Chandausi, and Thakurdwara. The eight Nagar (Town) Panchayats are:

1. Kanth
2. Chhajlet
3. Kundarki
4. Narauli
5. Rustamnagar Sahaspur
6. Umri Kalan
7. Sherua Dharampur
8. Dhakia

There are 1,210 villages and 584 gram panchayats in the district. Some of the popular villages includeː

- Bhikanpur
- Khalilpur Amru
- Handalpur
- Ratupura
- Sadarpur Matlabpur

== Economy ==
Contribution of different sectors in Moradabad's economy
1. Tertiary sector (44.7%)
2. Secondary sector (36.5%)
3. Primary sector (18.8%)

According to the Gross District Domestic Product (GDDP) figures of FY 21-22 published by the Uttar Pradesh Department of Economic Statistics, with a GDDP of almost 34,412 crores (approx. $4.1 billion) Moradabad district has 13th largest economy in the state. It's also the 8th largest economy in the Western Uttar Pradesh region, which contributes the most to UP's economy. The GDP per capita of the district based on these figures turns out to 110,065 or $1,322.8 (calculated upon 2011 population data).

By comparison, in FY 20-21 the GDDP of Moradabad was 28,616.56 crores. That means the economy of Moradabad district grew at a robust 20.25% in FY 21-22, which is more than the 16.8% growth rate of Uttar Pradesh GSDP during the same period. It's also more than the national GDP growth rate of 8.7% during the same period.

=== Sectoral and industrial contributions ===
Tertiary sector contributes the most to district economy with a collective contribution 13,855 crores, while the Secondary sector contributes 11,323 crores. Primary sector contributes the least at 5,835 crores. This mix of all three economic sectors makes Moradabad's economy a quite diversified one compared to the heavily manufacturing or service-driven economies.

Most contributing industries
Industries	Contribution (in crores)
Manufacturing	7,629
Agriculture, Forestry and Fishing	5,756
Real estate and professional services	3,361

Speaking of individual industries, manufacturing contributes the most to district economy with a gross value addition (GVA) of 7,629 crores. Second in line is agriculture, which contributes 5,757 crores and third is Real estate with 3,361 crores.

Other industries with notable contributions include:

- Construction at GVA of 3,210 crores
- Trade, Hotel and Restaurant at GVA of 2,757 crores
- Transport, Storage and Communication at GVA of 2,180 crores.

== Notable people ==
- Jigar Moradabadi
- Piyush Chawla
- Ponty Chadha
- Robert Vadra
- Sufi Amba Prasad
- Arun Lal
- Govind Swarup
- Javed Jaffrey
- Naeemuddin Muradabadi

== See also ==
- Bhikanpur, Moradabad
- 1888 Moradabad hailstorm
