= Moradabad =

City in Rohilkhand, Uttar Pradesh, India

- City
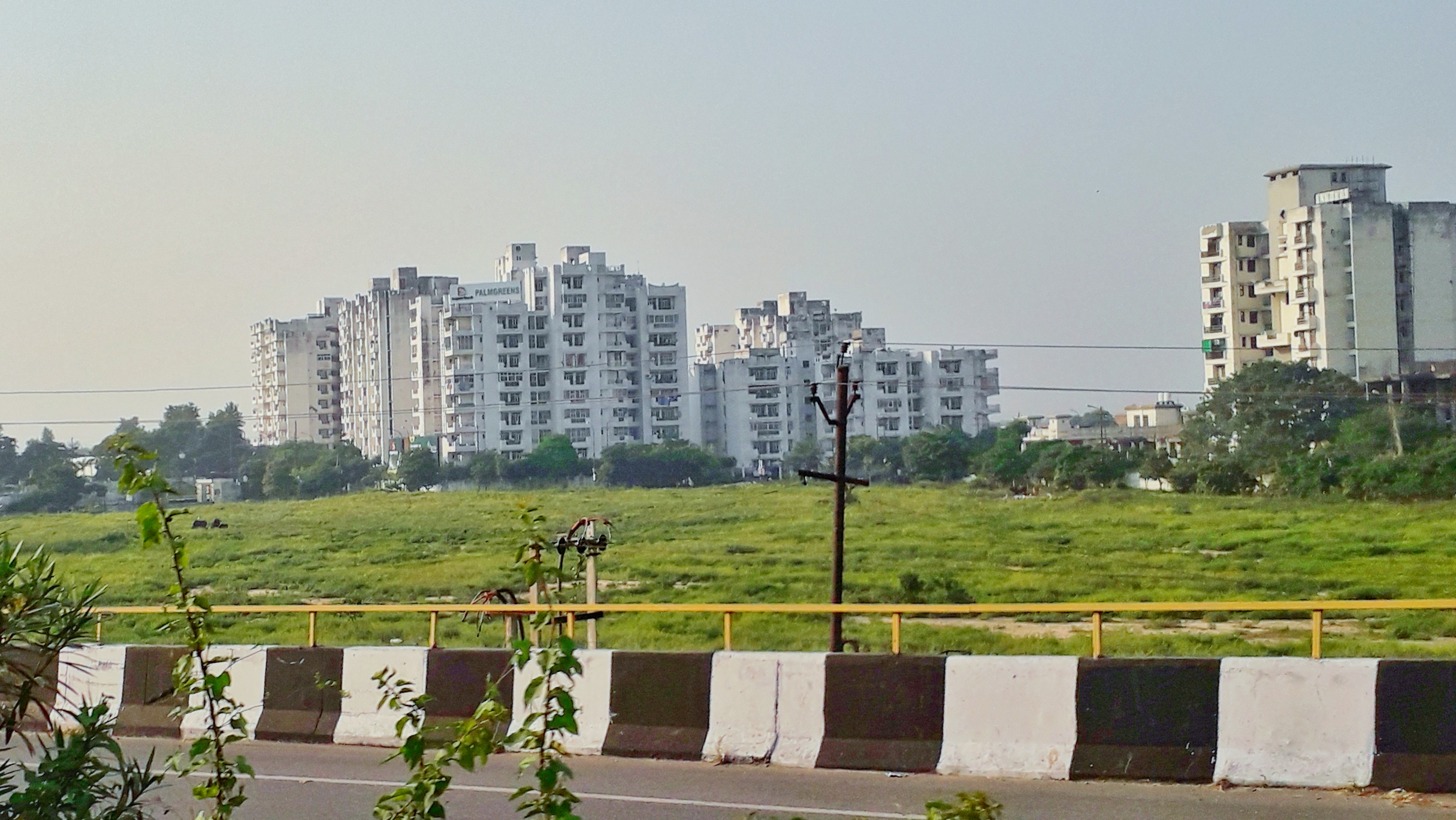
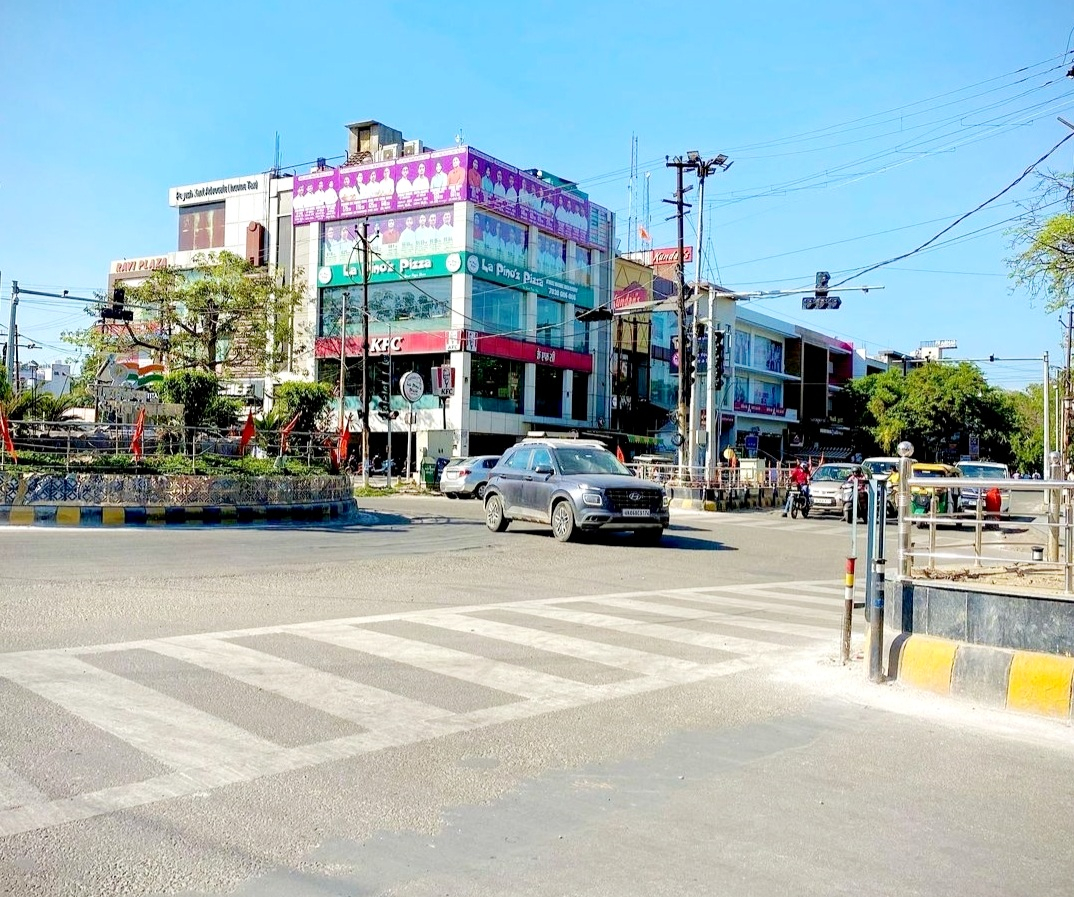
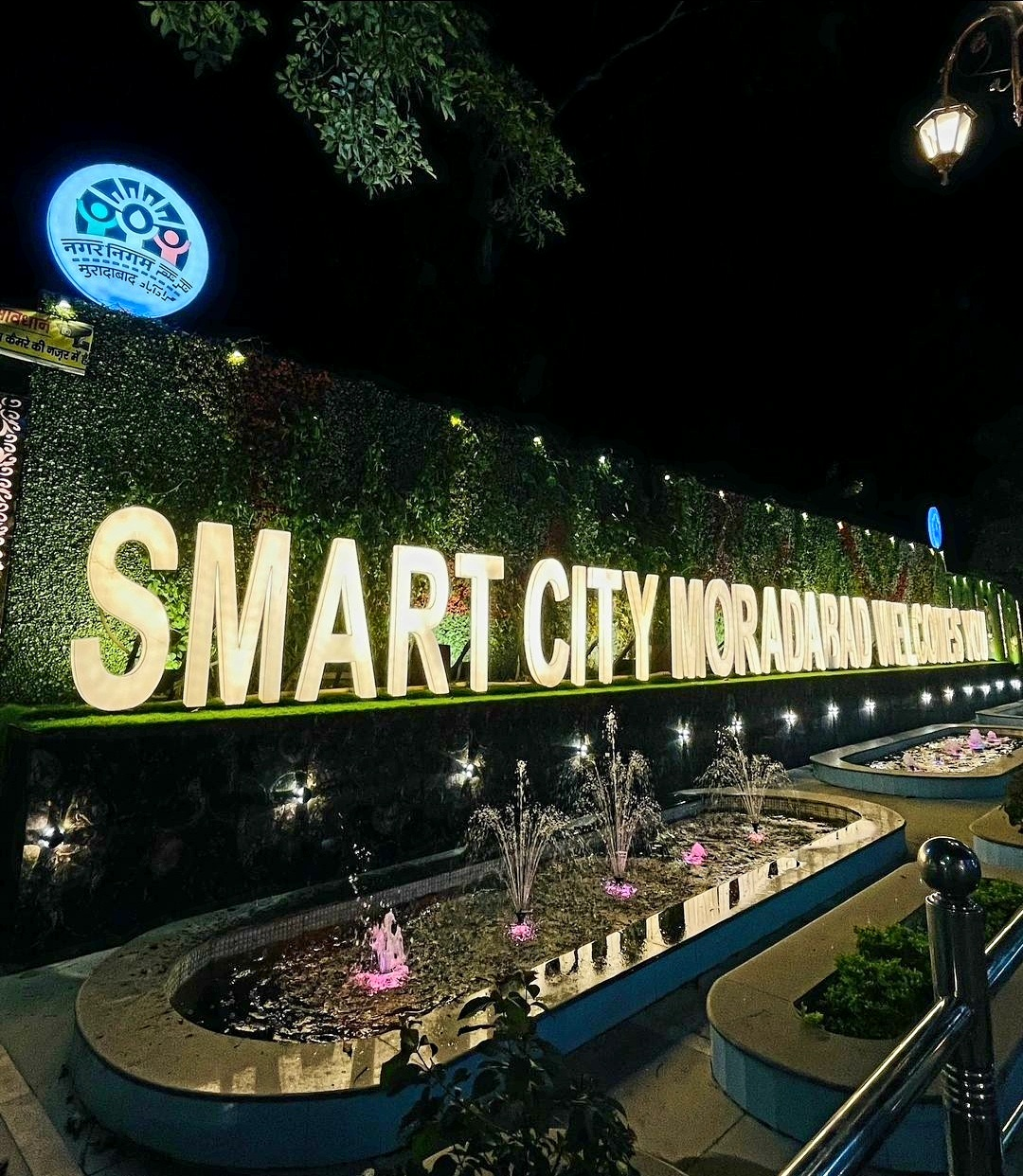
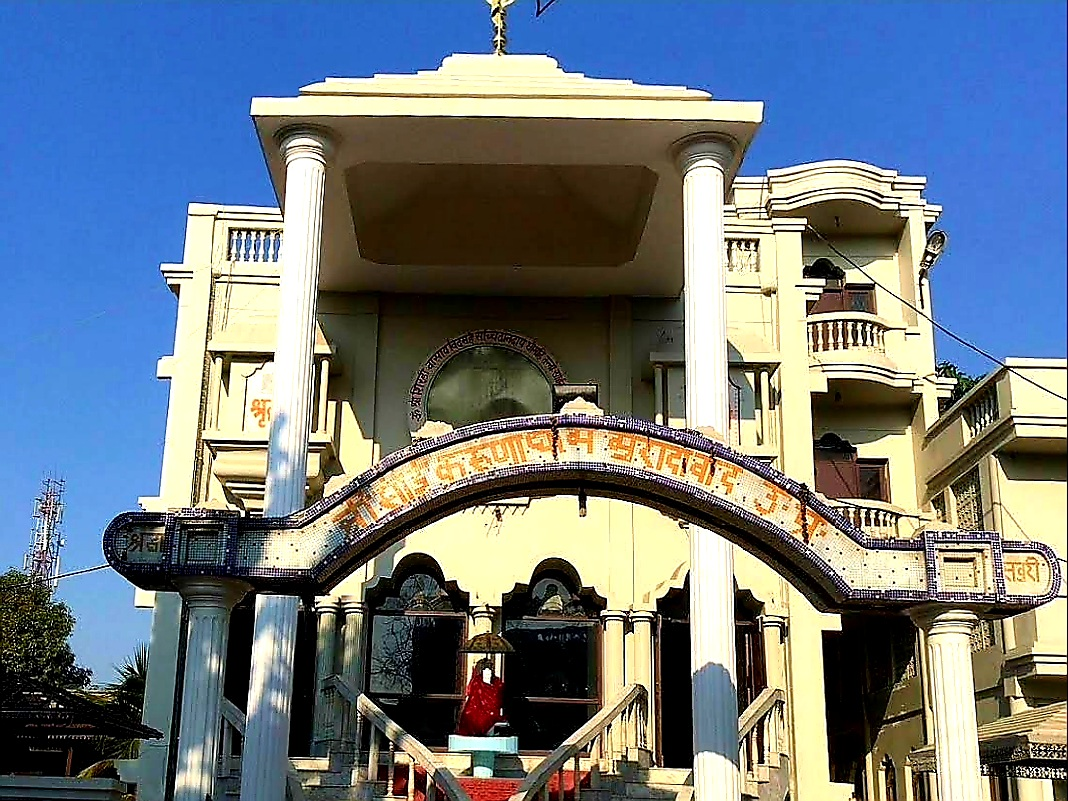
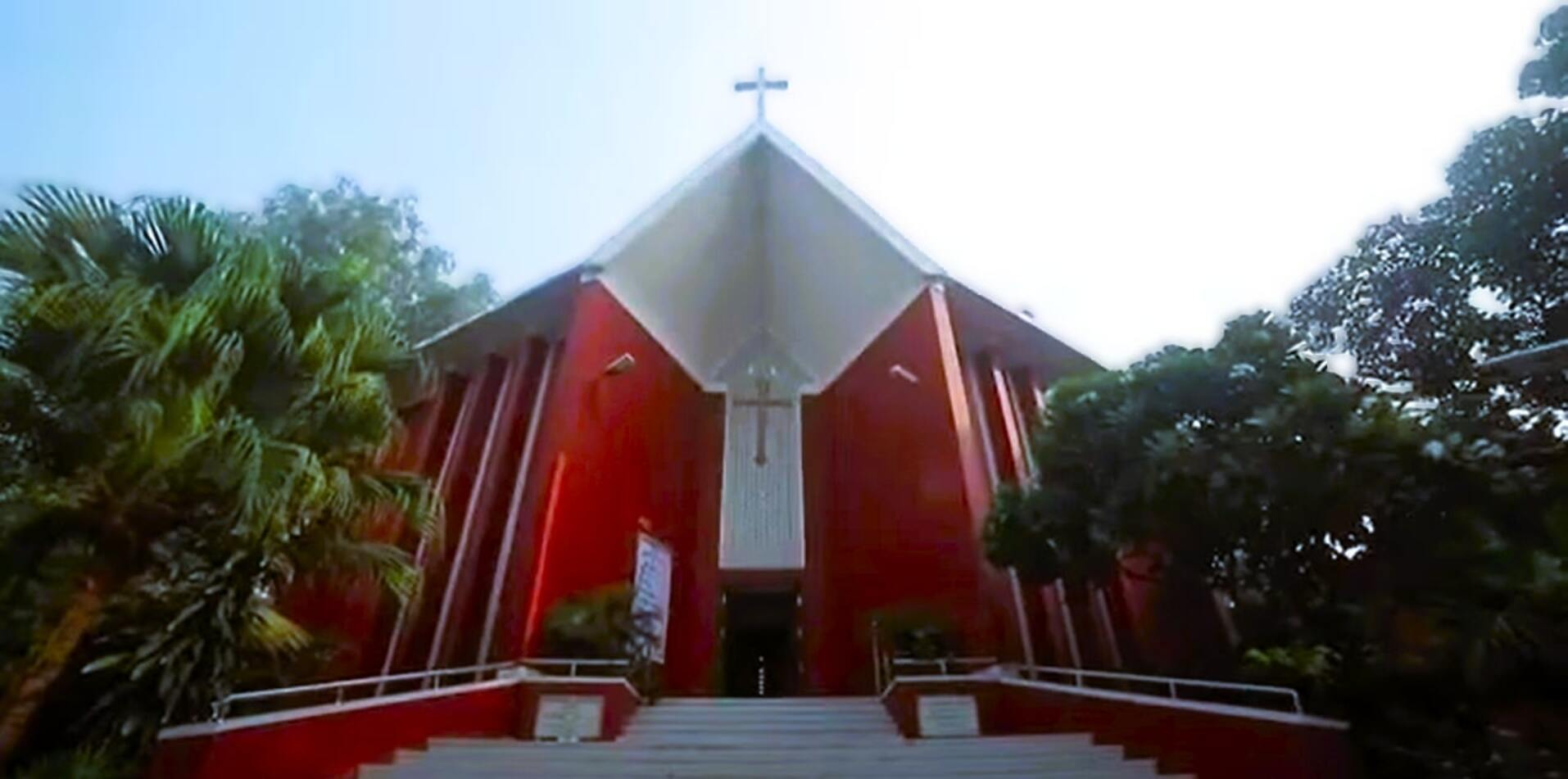
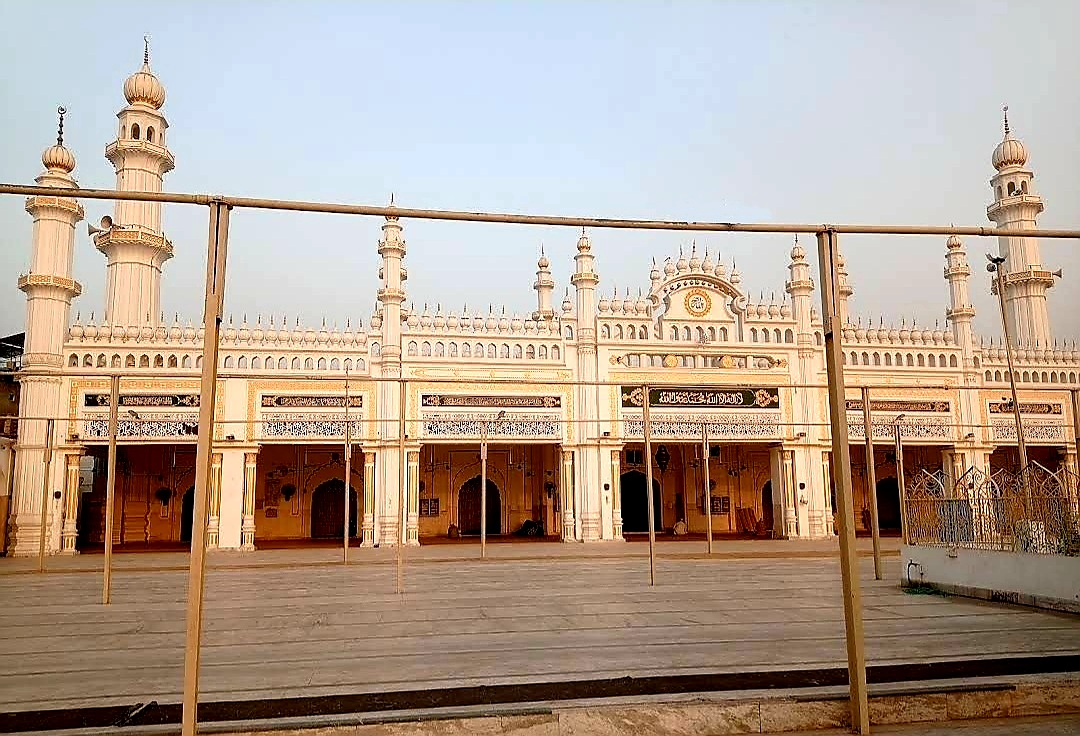
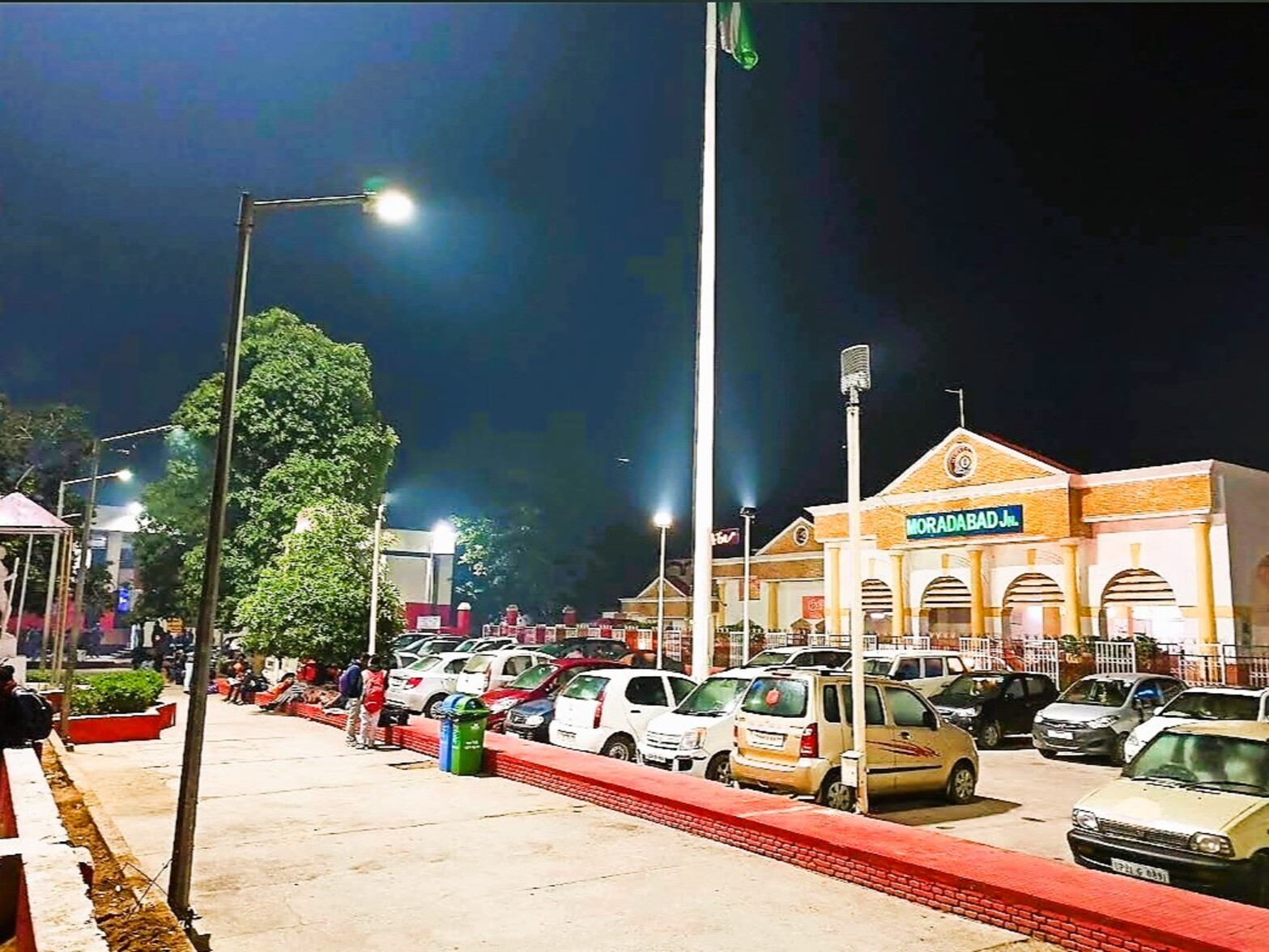
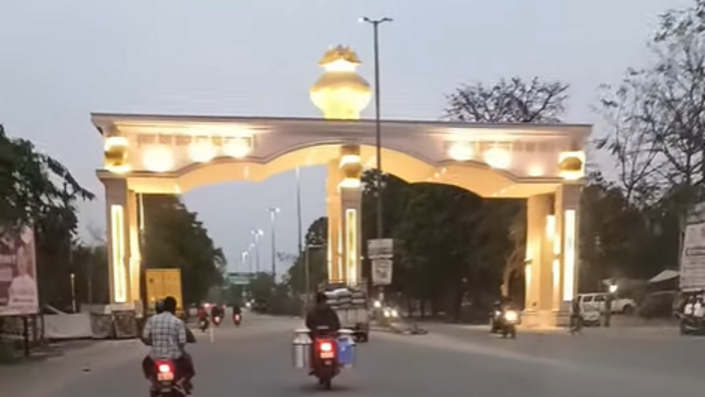
- New Moradabad Skyline Pili Kothi Chowk Pilikothi Welcome Sign Sai Mandir Philips Memorial Methodist Church Jama Masjid Moradabad Railway Station Moradabad Entry Gate (Zero Point)
- Nickname: Brass City
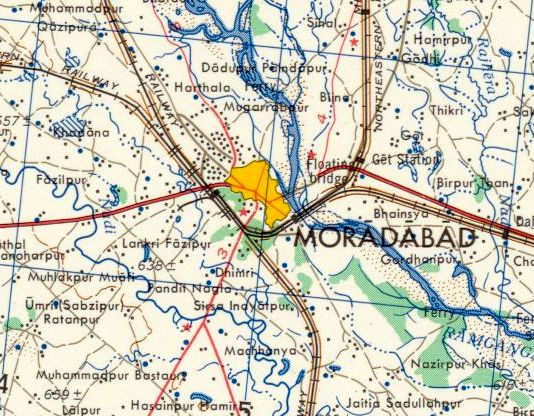
- An old map of Moradabad (1955)

- Location in Uttar Pradesh Moradabad (India) Moradabad (Asia)
- Coordinates: 28°49′55″N 78°46′35″E
- Country: India
- State: Uttar Pradesh
- District: Moradabad
- Established: 1625
- Named for: Murad Bakhsh

Government
  - MP: Ruchi Veera (SP)
  - Mayor: Vinod Agarwal (BJP)
  - District Magistrate: Shri Anuj Singh, (IAS)
  - MLA: Ritesh Kumar Gupta (BJP)

Area
  - Total: 79 km^{2} (31 sq mi)
- Elevation: 198 m (650 ft)

Population (2011)
  - Total: 889,810
  - Density: 11,000/km^{2} (29,000/sq mi)
- Demonym: Moradabadi

Languages
  - Official: Hindi, Urdu
- Time zone: UTC+5:30 (IST)
- PIN: 244001
- Telephone code: 0591
- Vehicle registration: UP-21
- Website: moradabad.nic.in

Moradabad (Hindi pronunciation: [mʊɾaːd̪aːbaːd̪]) is an industrial city, police commissionerate and municipal corporation in Moradabad district of the Indian state of Uttar Pradesh. It is on the banks of the Ramganga river, 165 km (103 mi) from the national capital, New Delhi and 356 km north-west of the state capital, Lucknow. Based on the 2011 census, it is the tenth most populous city in the state and 54th most populous city in the country. It is one of the largest cities in the Western UP region, and a hub for employment, education, industry, culture and administration.

The city is sometimes called Pital Nagri ("Brass City") for its brass handicrafts, which are exported across the world. In the last few decades it has started emerging as a hub for working in other metals also, including aluminium, steel, and iron. In October 2014, financial daily Livemint included Moradabad in its list of "25 emerging cities to watch out for in 2025".

Moradabad is also among the 100 smart cities being modernised under the National Smart Cities Mission of the Union Government of India.

During its four centuries of existence, the city has gone through multiple regime changes. It was firstly a part of the Delhi Sultanate, then flourished under the Mughal Empire, then was annexed into the Kingdom of Rohilkhand in 1742, and then came under the control of Oudh State in 1774 after the fall of Rohillas in the First Rohilla War. Finally, it was ceded to the British East India Company by the Nawab of Oudh in 1801. In the early 19th century, the British divided the Rohilkhand area into the Rampur State and two districts: the Bareilly and Moradabad districts. The city of Moradabad then became the headquarters of the latter.

Moradabad was connected with railway lines during the latter half of the nineteenth century. A line connecting Moradabad to Chandausi was built in 1872 and it was continued up to Bareilly in 1873. The Bareilly-Moradabad chord via Rampur was completed in 1894, which was extended to Saharanpur in 1886. A branch line to Aligarh via Chandausi was opened in 1894, while Moradabad was linked to Ghaziabad in 1900. It is also the divisional headquarter of the Moradabad division of Northern Railway (NR).

== Etymology ==
The settlement was founded by Rustam Khan, the governor of Katehar under the Mughal emperor Shah Jahan. Moradabad is named after prince Murad Bakhsh, the youngest son of the emperor. It was originally known as Chaupala and was a part of the Katehar region, before falling to Mughal governor Rustam Khan Dakhani in 1624, who changed its name to Rustamnagar after himself.

The name Rustamnagar, however, was short-lived. Shah Jahan called Rustam Khan to his court and demanded an explanation for why he had exceeded his orders. In an attempt to placate the emperor, Rustam Khan named the city Muradabad in honour of the young prince, Murad Bakhsh. The emperor was satisfied and permitted Rustam Khan to remain in charge of the new city, which replaced Sambhal as the Mughal governors' capital of the Katehar region, and the names Muradabad or Moradabad have remained.

== History ==
=== Delhi Sultanate era (12th century–16th century) ===
Moradabad was originally part of the Katehr (pronounced K-the-r) region, and was a stronghold of the Katheria Rajputs. The Katherias were known for insurrections and surprise attacks against their Muslim rulers, and because of that the rulers often attacked and plundered the region. Between 1200 and 1424 several attacks were made on the region by rulers of different dynasties under the Delhi Sultanate, each intending to destroy it and kill the inhabitants. Katheria Rajputs survived by hiding in the jungles. The cycle of violence ended only in 1424 when Khizr Khan, the leader of the Khalji dynasty ruling over the region, died and Har Singh, a leader of the Katherias, agreed to be subject to rule by the Delhi sultanate. The region remained largely in peace for the next two hundred years.

=== Mughal empire (1539–1742) ===
In 1530, the Katehr region came under the control of the Mughal emperor Humayun and was then conquered by Sher Shah Suri of Sur Empire. It remained under the Sur empire for 16 years before being reconquered by Humayun.

Under the Mughal Empire, Moradabad city was known as Chaupala, and was part of the Mugalpura pargana, which in turn was part of the sarkar of Sambhal as per Ain-i-Akbari. It produced a revenue of 1,340,812 dams for the imperial treasury and provided a force of five hundred infantry and a hundred cavalry to the Mughal army.

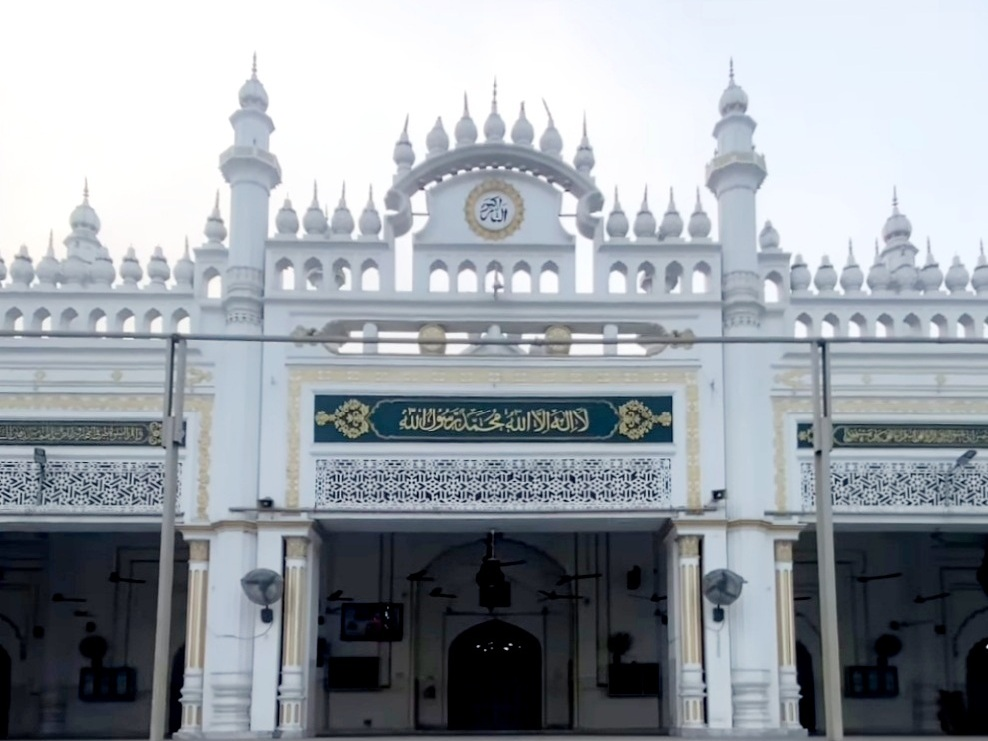
The facade of Moradabad's Jama Masjid founded by Rustam Khan

In 1624, a Katheria leader of Rampur, Raja Ram Singh, invaded the Tarai region. The raja of Kumaon Kingdom complained about it to Mughal emperor Shah Jahan, who sent his general and governor of Sambhal district Rustam Khan Dakhani to deal with the disturbance. Rustam Khan captured Chaupala, put Ram Singh to death, and refounded the city as Rustamnagar. He built a fort and mosque (Jama Masjid) on the banks of Ramganga river, and shifted the capital from Sambhal to the new city. It was the first Jama Masjid to be built on the banks of a river, and is still there, with an inscription dated to 1632.

Shah Jahan, however, was displeased with the actions of Rustam Khan. He summoned Rustam to his darbar and asked him why he had exceeded the instructions of the emperor and what name he had given to the new city. Rustam Khan sensed the mood of the emperor, and said that the name Muradabad honoured prince Murad Bakhsh, a son of Shah Jahan. The emperor was satisfied and allowed Rustam Khan to remain in charge of the city.

==== Rohilkhand state (1742–1774) ====
In the 1730s, people from a number of Afghan tribes, collectively known as Rohillas, were fleeing Afghanistan due to Nader Shah's invasion. They arrived in large numbers and settled in all parts of the Katehr region, including Moradabad. One of them, Ali Mohammed Khan, acquired considerable estate in the region and attained the status of Nawab under the protection of Moradabad's Mughal governor Sheikh Azmatullah. Under the protection of the Mughal empire in 1742, he then founded the Ruhelkhand state, consisting of the Moradabad district as well as Bareilly, Rampur, and Amroha. The region largely prospered under Rohillas despite the invasions of Ahmad Shah Durrani and the Marathas. However, in their final invasion Marathas plundered and ravaged the city of Sambhal and Moradabad.

==== Oudh state (1774–1801) ====
The Nawab of Oudh, Shuja-ud-Daula, promised the Rohillas that he would drive the Marathas out of the Rohilkhand region in exchange for a sum of Rs. 40 lakhs. He kept his part of the promise, but the Rohillas did not make the payment. The Nawab of Oudh then staked a claim to the entire Rohilkhand region, and started occupying its cities and bringing Rohilla leaders under his influence, including the governors of Moradabad. He defeated the Rohilla leader Hafiz Rahmat Khan Barech in the battle of Miranpur Katra, putting an end to the Rohilkhand state and bringing all of its territory, including Moradabad, under Oudh rule in 1774. By that time, Moradabad was already devastated because of the Maratha invasion, and under Oudh rule its condition deteriorated further.

=== British Empire (1801–1947) ===
Oudh state had incurred significant debts from the British empire by maintaining British troops in their dominion for the purpose of security from invaders. Since it was unable to pay those debts, in 1801 the Oudh state ceded the entire Rohilkhand region to the British empire. The already deteriorated economic condition of the city worsened further under British rule because of their ignorance of the landholding class of the city. Their policies neglected existing landowners and tried to create a new landholding class through a bidding system. The landholders used force to protect their lands.

For ordinary people, average income and wages almost halved. The discontent this produced led to the rebellion against British rule in 1857.

==== The Rebellion of 1857 ====
During the Indian Rebellion of 1857, British officers were forced out of the city and the rebels formed an alternative government. Unlike other places where rebelling was largely limited to sepoys and a few unsocial elements, in Moradabad both landowners and ordinary people supported the rebellion because of the repressive policies of the British rule.

On 15 May 1857, a battle took place between the rebel sepoys of 20th Native Infantry and the forces of 29th Native Infantry led by John Cracroft Wilson. One sepoy was killed, while eight were captured and taken prisoners. Three days later on 19 May the rebellion spread to the 29th Native Infantry; the district jail was broken into and 170 prisoners and rebel sepoys escaped.

On 8 May the news of Mutiny in Bareilly came to the city, and its effect was instantaneous: "the sepoys of 29th Native Infantry overtook the British treasury and challenged their English officers". The British officers and their family members had to escape to the valleys of Nainital district, and those who did not were killed. Nawab Majju Khan, a leader of the rebels and a descendant of Sheikh Azmatullah, became the new governor of Moradabad. He was overthrown on 23 June by Asad Ali Khan, the uncle of Rampur's Yusef Ali Khan, who supported the British. But despite having appointed his uncle in charge of the city Nawab Rampur had little control over the state of affairs in the city as there was a feeling of resentment and anger among the public against the British and their supporters. Violence and anarchy continued in the city.

A year later, the British Army returned to the city on 21 April 1858, with a bigger force, and started capturing the freedom fighters. Those who were captured were killed in brutal ways to terrorize the public. They were shot dead, hanged, and many were thrown alive into lime furnaces. Nawab Majju Khan was captured and shot dead, with his body hanged on a Tamarind tree in Galshaheed area. On April 30, 1858, the British rule over Moradabad was re-established.

==== Civil Disobedience Movement and Quit India Movement ====
Moradabad played a major role in the Civil disobedience and Quit India Movement initiated by Mahatma Gandhi. The Civil Disobedience Movement was planned at the 1920 convention of Oudh state Congress in Moradabad, attended by all major leaders of the Congress party, including Jawaharlal Nehru, Sarojini Naidu and Annie Besant. When the movement began in 1932, Moradabad's people took part to protest against the unlawful arrests and repression of freedom fighters.

The Quit India Movement saw large-scale violence in Moradabad, including a massacre at Pan Dariba in which six people were killed and more than two hundred injured by the police firing on the protesters. There were more protests and violence in the city afterwards.

=== Post-independence (1947–present) ===
India became independent in 1947, and since Moradabad was not a part of any princely state, it became part of the newly-independent country immediately. The city became industrialised. A major Hindu-Muslim riot took place in 1980.

==== 1980 Hindu-Muslim riots ====
The 1980 Moradabad riots are sometimes described as Uttar Pradesh's first major incident of communal violence in Independent India. The immediate catalyst for rioting was a rumour that a stray animal had entered the Eidgah on 13 August 1980, the day of Eid al-Fitr when more than 50,000 Muslims had gathered at the Eidgah for their prayers. When the Muslims asked the police on duty to remove the animal, it led to heated arguments between both sides, followed by stones thrown at the police.

The police and Provincial Armed Constabulary (PAC) personnel started firing, which resulted in hundreds of civilians being killed. The official death toll (including missing people) reported by the state government of that time was 289, though unofficial sources claimed the figure to be much higher. The violence spread to other nearby cities including Sambhal, Bareilly, and Delhi, eventually reaching as far as Aligarh and Prayagraj. It took several months for normality to return.

== Geography ==
A map of the city

Moradabad is in the Western part of Uttar Pradesh at 28°49′55″N 78°46′35″E. The city has an area of 79 km square, and is in the upper part of Ganga's plains. It is surrounded by rural towns and villages, including Dalpatpur, Pakbada, Fatehpur Khas, Lodhipur, Ratanpur, Husainpur Hamir, Dilari, Bijna and Ghatuawala, making up the Moradabad district. The city is in the high damage risk Seismic Zone IV, which means it is an earthquake-prone area.

The city is rich in groundwater resources. It is at an elevation of 198 meters from sea level on the banks of the Ramganga river, which is a tributary of the Ganges. Another small river, called Gagan, flows through the city. These rivers form the main water flow system of the city, with direction of the flow north-west to south-east.

The city has minimal forest cover, but green zones have been established in some areas. There are at least 29 trees in the city that are more than a hundred years old, all of which have been preserved under the city administration's Green Heritage project. Most of these trees fall in the central Civil Lines area of the city, and they include Neem, Banyan, Indian Blackberry and Ficus virens.

The soil in the city is loam and clay loam with high fertility.

== Climate ==
Moradabad has a subtropical humid climate characterised by hot summers, bracing winters, and generally low precipitation (except in the southwest monsoon season). The city has four distinct seasons in a year, starting with winters followed by spring, summer, monsoon and autumn in the same order, before returning to winter towards the end of the year. Average annual maximum temperature of the city is 30.4 °C, while average annual minimum temperature is 18.7 °C.

During summers, the temperature usually ranges between 24 °C to 40 °C and during winters it is between 5 °C to 20 °C. The hottest month of the year is May, with average maximum temperature at 38.9 °C and average minimum temperature at 24.4 °C. The coldest month of the year is January with average maximum temperature at 19.9 °C and average minimum temperature at 7.9 °C. The highest temperature recorded was 48.2 °C on 22 June 1985, and the lowest temperature was 0.0 °C on 12 January 1983.

Average annual rainfall in the city is 107.7 cm, with almost 87% during the southwest monsoon season between July and August. The average highest rainfall is recorded in August at 34.4 cm, and average annual rainy days are 42. Average lowest rainfall is recorded in the month of November at 0.3 cm. The single day heaviest rainfall recorded was 12 February 1996, with 40 cm of rain within 24 hrs.

Climate data for Moradabad (1991–2020, extremes 1967–present)
Month	Jan	Feb	Mar	Apr	May	Jun	Jul	Aug	Sep	Oct	Nov	Dec	Year
Record high °C (°F)	28.5 (83.3)	33.0 (91.4)	39.4 (102.9)	45.0 (113.0)	45.5 (113.9)	45.9 (114.6)	44.0 (111.2)	39.7 (103.5)	39.0 (102.2)	37.0 (98.6)	34.7 (94.5)	30.1 (86.2)	48.2 (118.8)
Mean daily maximum °C (°F)	19.0 (66.2)	23.9 (75.0)	29.6 (85.3)	36.4 (97.5)	38.9 (102.0)	37.3 (99.1)	33.4 (92.1)	32.3 (90.1)	31.8 (89.2)	30.8 (87.4)	26.7 (80.1)	22.0 (71.6)	30.3 (86.5)
Mean daily minimum °C (°F)	8.4 (47.1)	11.7 (53.1)	16.3 (61.3)	21.7 (71.1)	25.1 (77.2)	26.5 (79.7)	26.1 (79.0)	25.7 (78.3)	24.6 (76.3)	20.1 (68.2)	14.6 (58.3)	10.1 (50.2)	19.4 (66.9)
Record low °C (°F)	0.0 (32.0)	2.0 (35.6)	5.0 (41.0)	10.0 (50.0)	16.0 (60.8)	17.0 (62.6)	19.0 (66.2)	14.0 (57.2)	16.0 (60.8)	12.1 (53.8)	5.0 (41.0)	2.0 (35.6)	0.0 (32.0)
Average rainfall mm (inches)	18.9 (0.74)	24.7 (0.97)	14.0 (0.55)	7.0 (0.28)	24.9 (0.98)	111.0 (4.37)	299.4 (11.79)	319.4 (12.57)	183.2 (7.21)	28.5 (1.12)	3.8 (0.15)	8.8 (0.35)	1,043.6 (41.09)
Average rainy days	1.3	1.8	1.2	0.7	2.0	5.4	10.8	11.6	7.0	1.2	0.4	0.6	44.1
Average relative humidity (%) (at 17:30 IST)	71	59	48	36	40	55	75	81	77	64	61	67	61
Source: India Meteorological Department

== Demographics ==
Religions in Moradabad City (2011)
Religion	Percent
Hinduism	51.68%
Islam	46.79%
Christianity	0.61%
Sikhism	0.43%
Other or not stated	0.49%
Distribution of religions

=== Population ===
Moradabad's estimated population in 2025 (based on growth rate data) is at least 1,296,000. These are estimates and accurate population can be known only after a census has taken place.

In the census of 2011, Moradabad City had a population of 887,871. The city had 464,580 males and 423,291 females, which translates into a sex ratio of 911 females for every 1000 males. Its population growth rate over the decade 2001–2011 was 25.25%. Scheduled Castes make up 10.45% of the population.

Children aged up to six years made up 13.08% of the city's population mix at 116,149. There were 60,803 male and 55,346 female children, which translates to a child sex ratio of 910 females per 1,000 males.

Languages in Moradabad (2011)
1. Hindi (81.2%)
2. Urdu (18.3%)
3. Others (0.57%)

=== Religion ===
Moradabad is a Hindu-majority city with an almost equal number of Muslims. 51.68% of the population in the city follows Hinduism. Islam, which is followed by 46.79% of people. Christianity, Sikhism, Buddhism and Jainism are practised by 0.61%, 0.43%, 0.03% and 0.05%, respectively.

=== Language ===
Moradabad is largely a Hindi/Urdu speaking city. Hindi is the predominant language, with more than 81% of people speaking and understanding it. Urdu is second with more than 18% of speakers. The dialect spoken is Kauravi dialect.

=== Literacy ===
The 2011 census found 530,584 literate people in the city, and a literacy rate of 58.67%. 291,605 of literate people were male and 238,979 were females. This is a male literacy rate of 72.21% and a female literacy rate of 64.95%.

== Government and politics ==
=== Civic administration ===
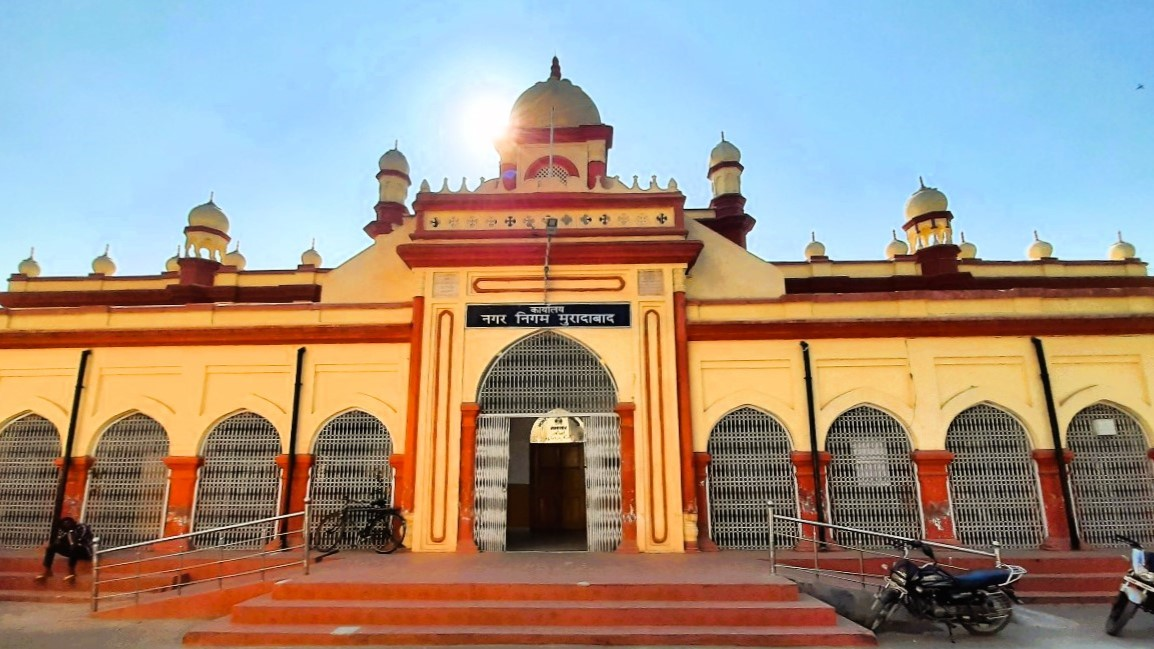
The building of Moradabad Municipal Corporation or Nagar Nigam Moradabad

The civic administration of Moradabad city is managed by the Moradabad municipal corporation, also known as Nagar Nigam Moradabad (NNM). It is one of the only 17 Nagar Nigams in the state of Uttar Pradesh. By comparison, there are 200 nagar palikas and 545 nagar panchayats in the state. It was given the status of Nagar Nigam in 1994; before that it was a Nagar Palika.

The Nagar Nigam of Moradabad is led by an elected mayor who is chosen through voting by the public, and holds the post for five years. Seventy ward councillors are elected by the public, each of whom represents a specific area (known as a "ward" in administrative terms) of the city. A municipal commissioner is a permanent executive of Nagar Nigam, and most of the executive powers vested in the various committees are under their chairmanship. The commissioner is usually a Provincial Civil Service (PCS) officer appointed by the state government, and is responsible for all day-to-day functions of the municipal corporation.

The Nagar Nigam Board, consisting of MLAs, MP, Municipal Commissioner, and the district magistrate, organises periodic meetings chaired by the mayor to discuss and plan for development works and issues of Moradabad. The councillors raise issues related to their wards in these meetings. The budget of Nagar Nigam is approved through these meetings, and agreed spend is carried out under the watch of the municipal commissioner.

The works carried out by NNM include:

- Street lighting
- Road construction and management
- Water supply management
- Birth and death registration and issuance of their certificates
- Horticulture development and management
- Development and management of parks and other public spaces
- Waste management

The Nagar Nigam relies largely on grants from the Central and State Finance Commissions. It generates some revenue from house, water and property taxes, from trade license fees and from income generated from roadside advertisements.

==== Municipal finance ====
According to financial data published on the CityFinance Portal of the Ministry of Housing and Urban Affairs, the Moradabad Nagar Nigam reported total revenue receipts of ₹303 crore (US$36 million) and total expenditure of ₹245 crore (US$29 million) in 2022–23. Tax revenue accounted for about 8.9% of the total revenue, while the corporation received ₹261 crore in grants during the financial year.

=== Politics ===
Moradabad city is a part of the Moradabad Lok Sabha constituency, and sends one MP to the parliament. It sends two MLAs to the Uttar Pradesh Legislative Assembly, one each from Moradabad Nagar and Moradabad Rural assembly constituencies. The Lok Sabha constituency has not sent an incumbent MP back to the parliament for two successive terms since 1999. The current MP is Ruchi Veera of Samajwadi Party, who defeated the Bharatiya Janata Party's Kunwar Sarvesh Kumar Singh with a majority of 105,762 votes in the 2024 Indian general election.

Since its creation in 1952, the Moradabad Lok Sabha seat has been won eleven times by seven Muslim candidates, and six times by five Hindu candidates.

The Moradabad Nagar constituency has been won eleven times by six Hindu candidates and seven times by five Muslim candidates. It is not a swing constituency as it has a history of returning the incumbents since 1951. This trend was almost broken in the 2022 Uttar Pradesh Legislative Assembly election, when the current MLA Ritesh Kumar Gupta won against SP's Mohammad Yusuf Ansari with a majority of 782 votes only. It is a BJP-stronghold, as BJP has won it five out of seven times since 1993.

The Moradabad Rural assembly constituency has since its creation in 1957 been won thirteen times by seven Muslim candidates, and four times by three Hindu candidates. The current MLA is Mohammed Nasir of SP, who defeated BJP's KK Misra in 2022 by 56,820 votes. These results show the contrast in politics of urban and local centres of the city. Since 1996 the rural constituency has been a stronghold of the Samajwadi Party, which has won it five out of six times.

== Economy ==
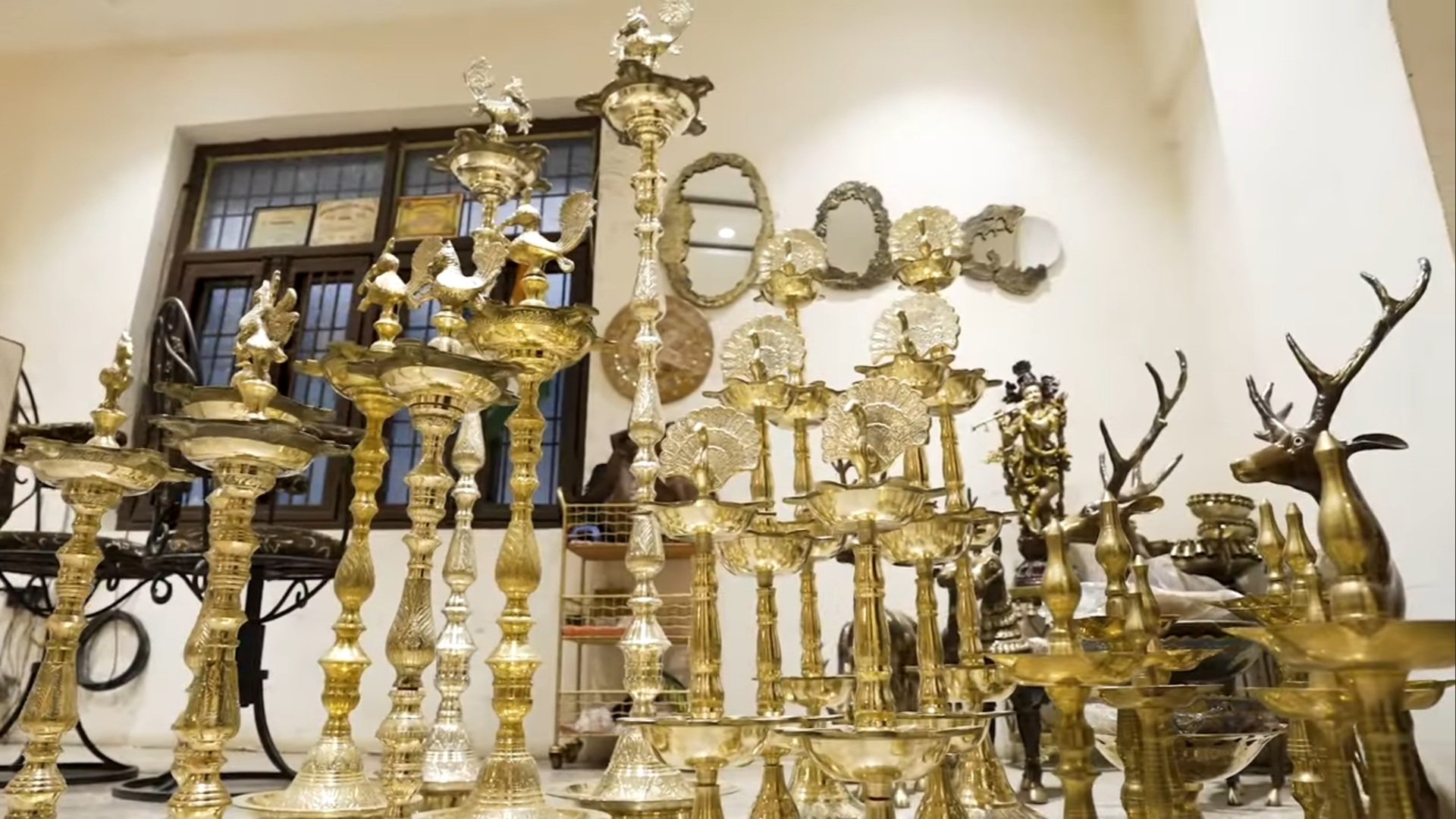
Brass handicrafts in a production unit of Moradabad

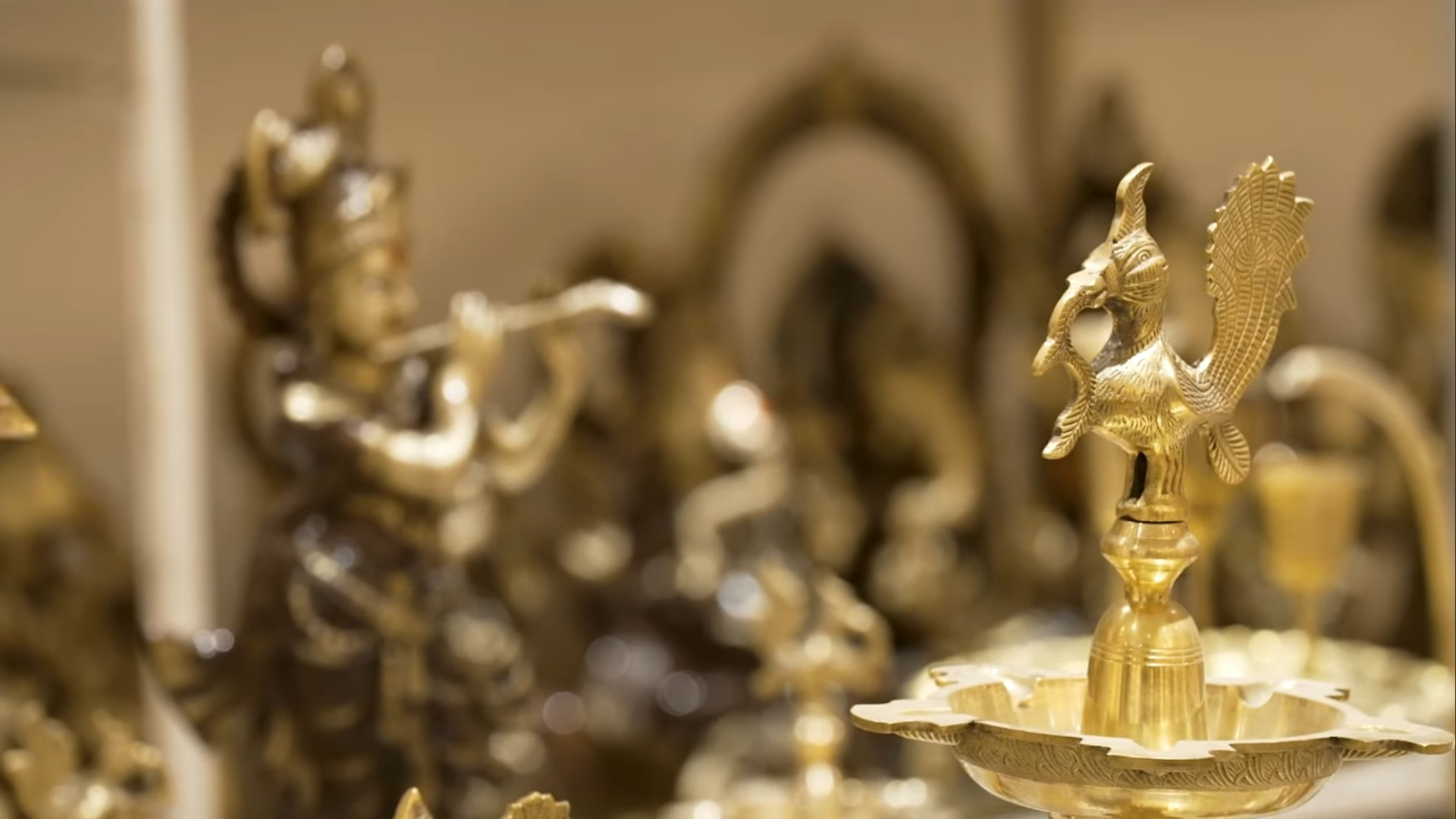
Brass Idols of Hindu deities made in Moradabad

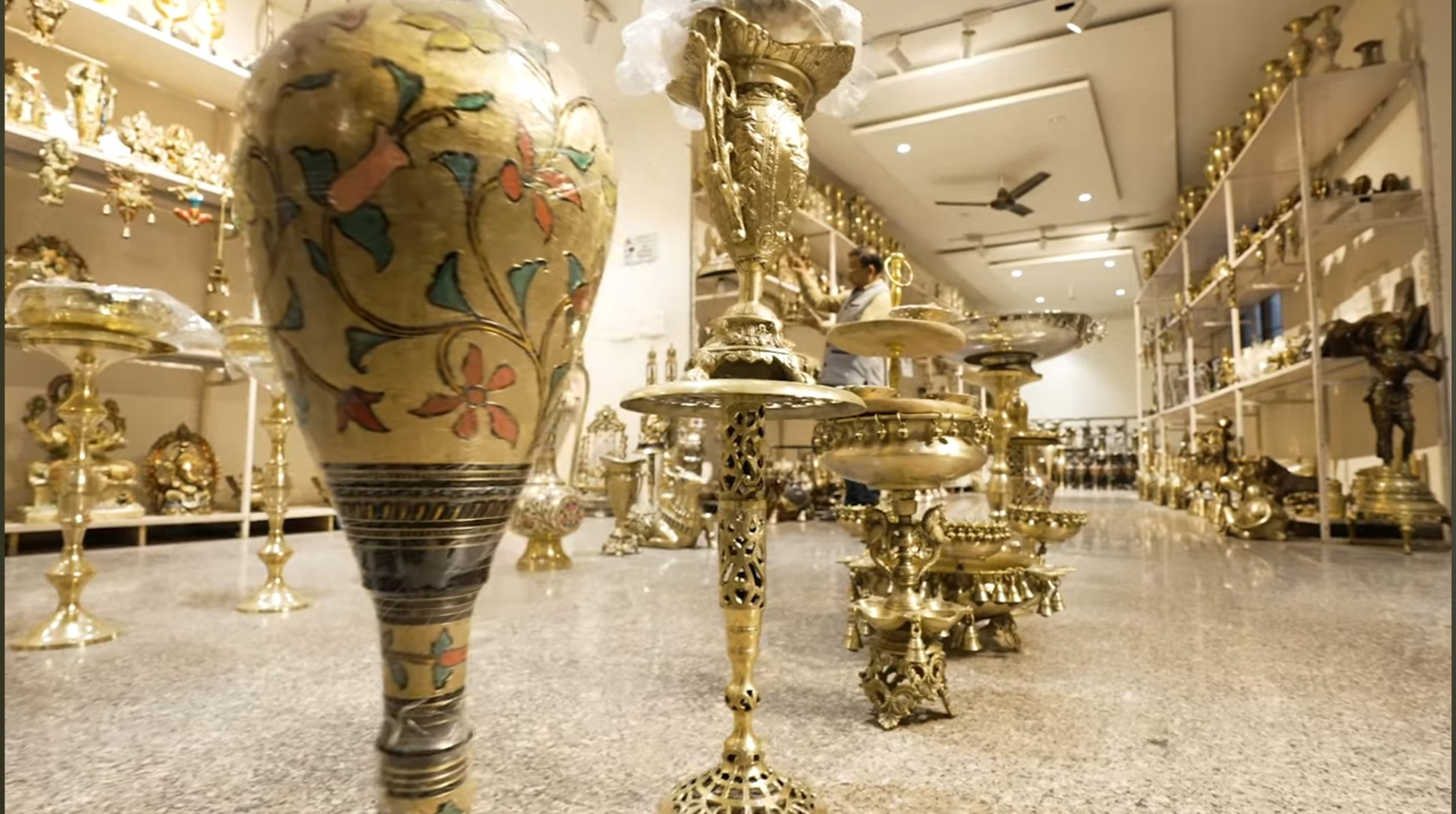
Designer brass showpieces in a showroom of Moradabad

Moradabad is a major industrial city of Uttar Pradesh and one of India's biggest export hubs. It is one of the seven industrial corridors declared by the State Government in Industrial Policy of 1999–2002. The city relies heavily on its brass and metalworks industry, which exports metal handicrafts and other items to more than 80 countries in North America, Europe, and other parts of Asia. Its metalcrafts industry accounts for more than 40% of total handicraft exports from India.

Most of this industry belongs to the unorganised sector, so data about it are largely in the form of estimates from industry associations, such as the Brass Handicrafts Manufacturers Association (BHMA) and the Peetal Basti Dastkar Association (PBDA). The industry is prone to challenges of the informal economy, such as unavailability of credit, poor access to government schemes, commoditisation, outdated technology, and low job security.

Estimates about employment generated from the industry range between 150,000 to 250,000 to 500,000 to 800,000. Most of these jobs are those of artisans and laborers involved in the manufacturing, packaging, enamelling, engraving and polishing of brass products. Over the years the brass industry has grown in size despite facing challenges such as the 2016 Indian banknote demonetisation, the COVID-19 pandemic in India and wars in Syria, Libya and Russia-Ukraine.

In 2007, Moradabad's export revenue was ₹3,200 crores, increased to ₹4,000 crores in 2012. By 2018, it had a metalcraft business sales turnover of ₹9,700 crores out of which ₹5,400 crores was export revenue; the same year Moradabad was counted amongst India's manufacturing hubs by The Economic Times. By 2020, it had reached ₹15,000 crores, of which ₹10,000 crores was export revenue.

In 2018, around 75 industrial units involved in the manufacturing of brassware were shut down by the state government following a National Green Tribunal order regarding the pollution of Ramganga river. Then the industry was hit by the COVID-19 pandemic. In 2020–21, the brass export turnover declined to ₹7,000 crores, and in 2021-22 declined further to ₹6,500 crores. As a result, manufacturers and exporters of Moradabad have started diversifying their businesses into other metalworks, including iron, steel and aluminium.

Estimated Annual Turnover of Moradabad's Brass Industry Over The Years
Financial Year	Turnover (in crores of INR)	Export Turnover (in crores of INR)
2007-08	NA	3,200
2011-12	NA	4,000
2017-18	9,700	5,400
2018-19	15,000	10,000
2019-20	8,500	NA
2020-21	9,500	7,000
2021-22	8,000	6,500

=== Manufacturing ===
Manufacturing industries of brassware and other metalware are the largest economic drivers and employment generators of Moradabad. While there are more than 9,000 registered industrial units in the city according to government records, the estimates provided by industry associations suggest that there are between 30,000 and 40,000 manufacturing units involved in the brass industry. The most manufactured items in these industrial units are home decoration items such as lamps, flower pots and showpieces, utensils, and idols of various gods.

=== Export ===
Moradabad is known as the Brass City of the country. Countries like Britain, the US, Middle East, Germany and Canada import brassware from Moradabad. There are about 4,000 export units in the city, of which six hundred are registered with the government. Other major products exported from Moradabad include iron sheets, metalwares, aluminium, artworks and glassware. Mint worth several crores is also exported from Moradabad.

=== Special Economic Zone ===
Moradabad Special Economic Zone (SEZ) is the only Uttar Pradesh Government developed SEZ in northern India. It is led by the development commissioner of the Noida SEZ and locally governed by the assistant development Commissioner. It was set up in 2003 at Pakbara–Dingarpur Road in Moradabad on a 421.565-acre plot of land and became operational in April 2007. According to data published by the Noida SEZ on behalf of NSDL, it had merchandise exports of ₹272 crores in FY 22–23. More than 42% of the export from this SEZ went to the United States, with Germany and the United Arab Emirates second and third at 14% and 8%.

The Uttar Pradesh Government has invested ₹110 crores on its development through the UP State Industrial Development Corporation (UPSIDC). The SEZ provides infrastructure, support services, and sector-specific facilities for the handicraft trade. Proximity to Delhi-NCR and availability of skilled workers makes it ideal for handicrafts and allied fields. In spite of the global slowdown in the handicraft trade, the Moradabad SEZ has grown from one unit in 2007 to 58 operational units in 2021.

Infrastructure, supportive services and trade related facilities have been upgraded. Moradabad SEZ offers access to the global telecommunication network, uninterrupted power supply and a local transport system. An RSU Telephone Exchange has been installed, and there are mobile communication towers. An independent feeder line has been provided for uninterrupted power supply, and the reliability and quality of power supply has improved with the 32 / 11 KVA / 5.0 MVA power sub-station within Moradabad SEZ. Proximity to Delhi-NCR provides access to the financial and commercial infrastructure of the capital. Customs wing ensures clearances of export/import consignments through a web-based system, SEZ Online.

== Cityscape ==
Moradabad's cityscape consists mostly of two and three-storey buildings developed by individual residents. Higher buildings (up to 10 storeys or more) are generally found in private townships of the city or in commercial establishments, such as hospitals or colleges. Many of these high-rise buildings were built after 2010 as the city's population grew because of people arriving from neighbouring states and cities in search of education or employment. The state government's Department of Housing and Urban Planning has built apartment complexes of up to four storeys in the city. The trend is expected to continue with more private townships towards the outer areas of the city.

=== Parks and recreation spaces ===
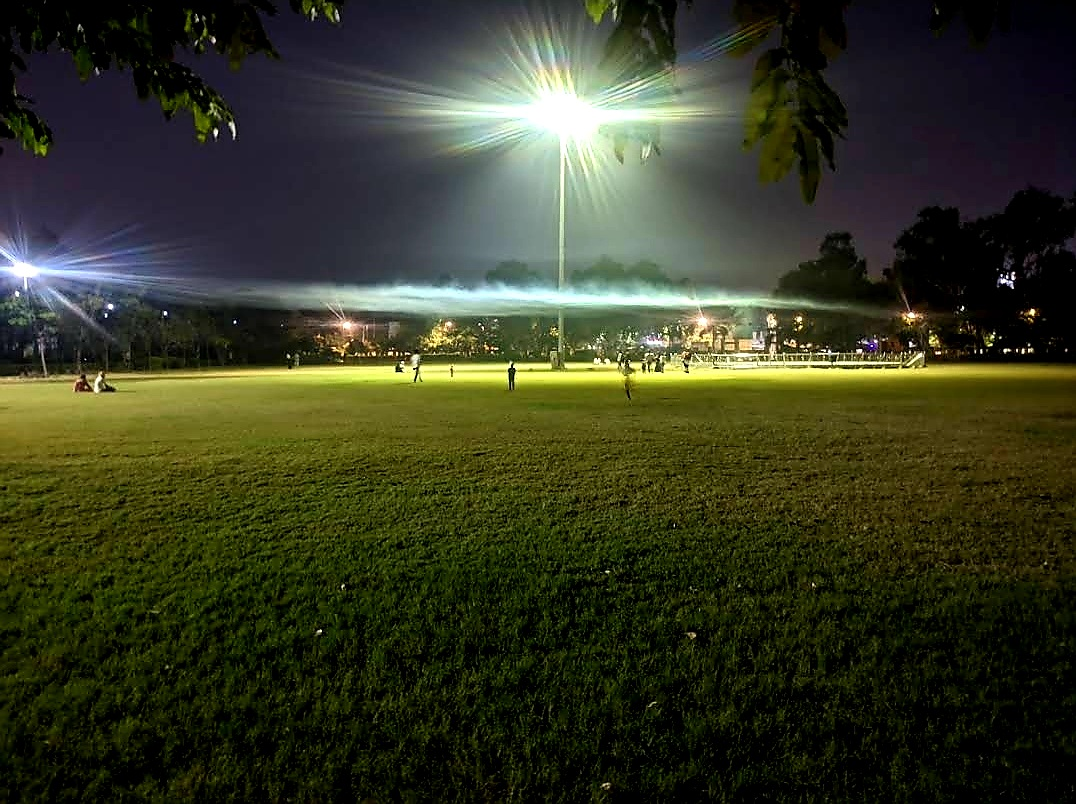
A view of the Company Baag at night

Moradabad has parks and recreational spaces in all of its neighbourhoods and localities. They include Company Baag, the Eco Herbal Park, Gautam Budh Park and Ambedkar Park. Company Baag, in the Civil Lines has existed since the days of the British East India Company. Legend says that it used to be a residential centre for the English officers before being burned down in the rebellion of 1857. After that the Britishers made it a garden for recreational purposes.

=== Shopping centres ===
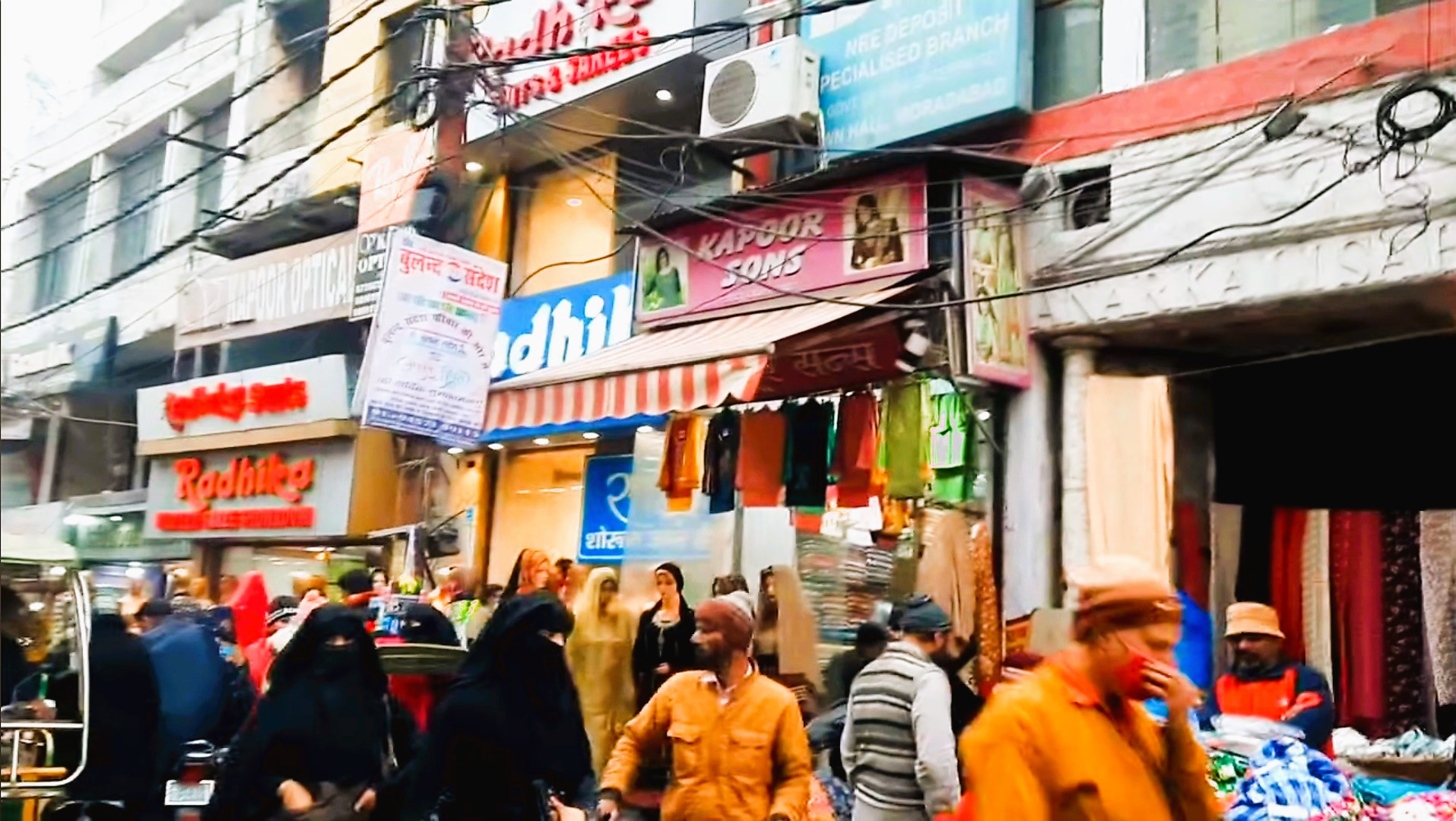
View of a local market in Moradabad

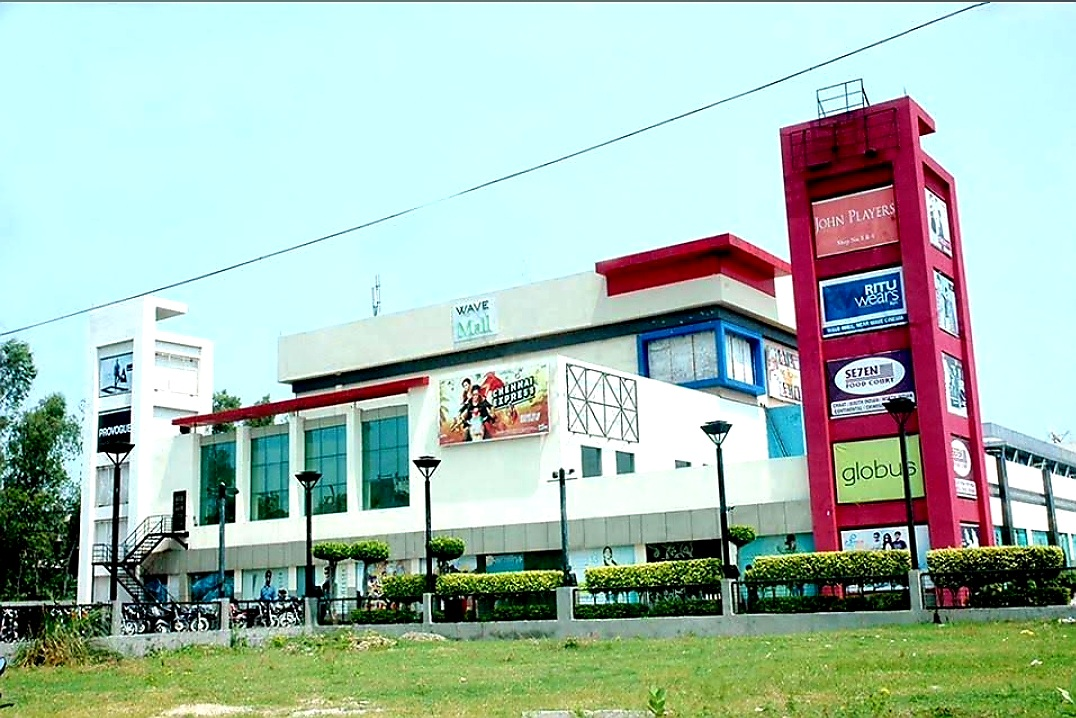
A view of the Wave Mall, one of the first and largest shopping malls in Moradabad

There are general purpose markets, product-specific markets, brand outlets and shopping malls. General purpose markets include Budh Bazaar, Town Hall, and markets on Tadikhana chauraha and Gurhatti chauraha. provide residents with all sorts of shopping needs. Weekly markets are held on Sunday and Tuesday in some areas.

== Sports ==
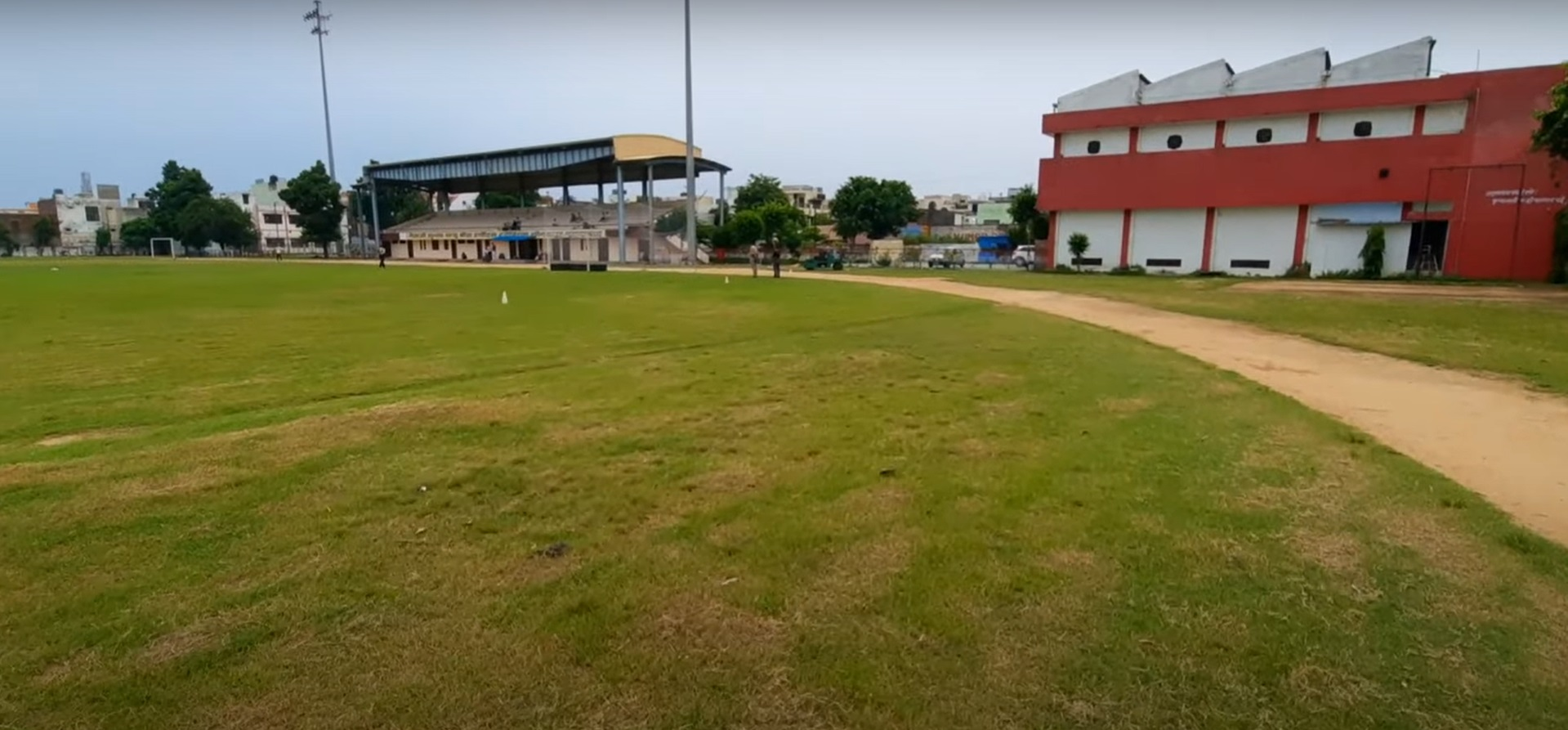
Pavilion of Sonakpur Stadium

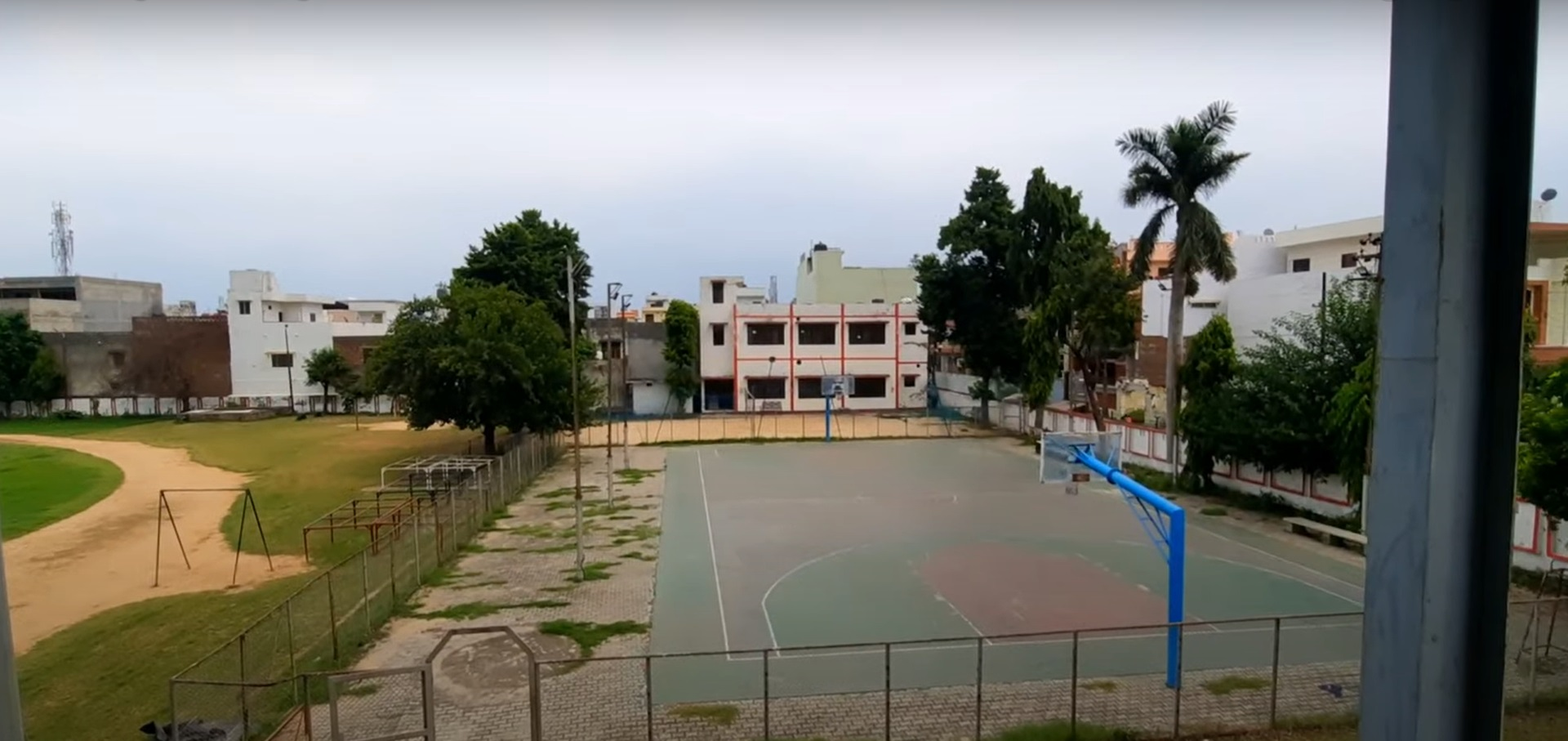
Basketball Court at the Stadium

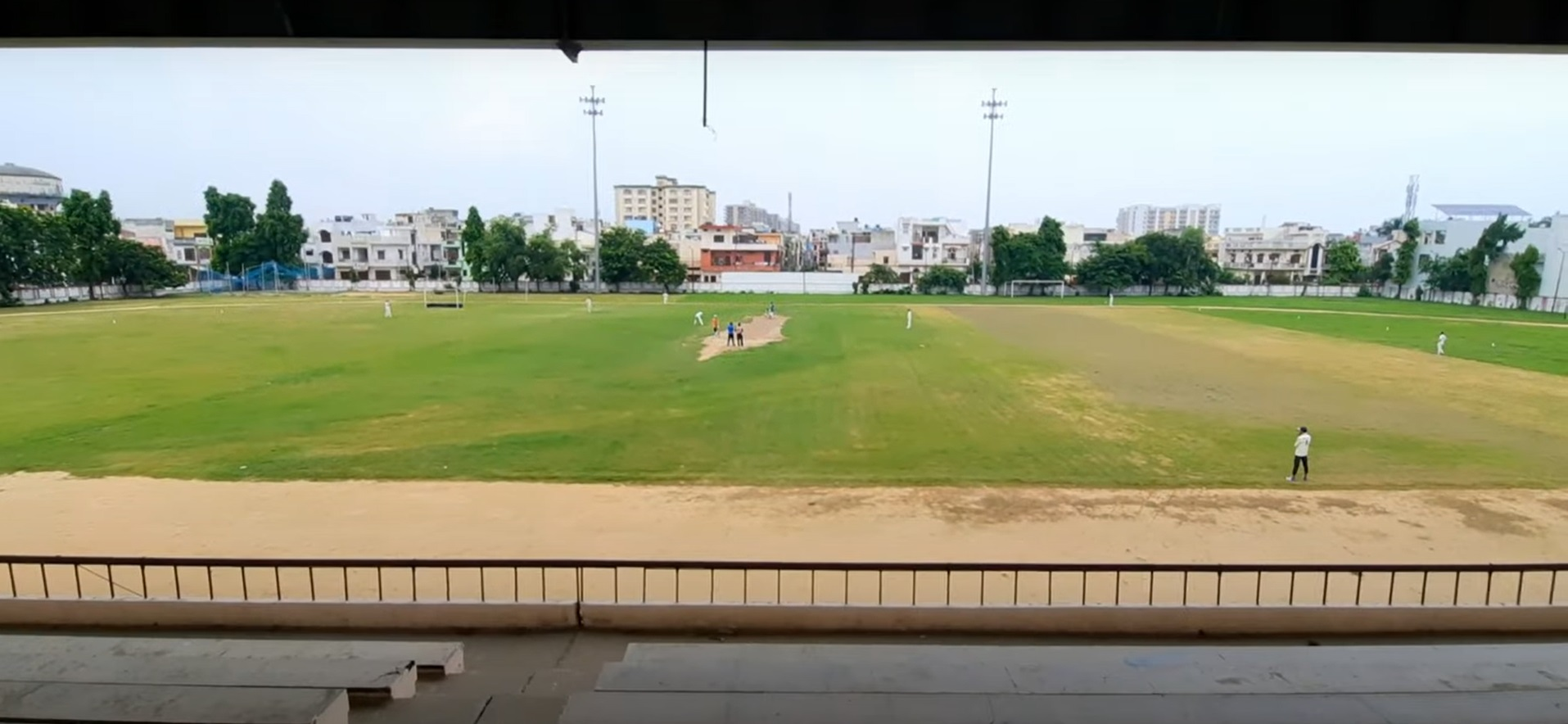
Stadium view from the Stands

Moradabad is a hub of sports activities not only for its own players but also for the aspiring players of neighbouring towns, such as Sambhal, Amroha, Gajraula and Rampur. The most popular sport is cricket, and there have been at two international cricketers from the city: Piyush Chawla and Arun Lal. Arjuna Award winner Mohammed Shami used to practice in the city during his initial cricketing days. Another cricketer from the city, Mohsin Khan, plays in the IPL for Lucknow Super Giants and is known for his lethal fast bowling.

These cricketers first practised in the Netaji Subhash Chandra Bose Sports Stadium, known as Sonakpur Stadium of Moradabad, which is the centre for sports events and activities in the city. The Moradabad zone Under-19 cricket team is based in the city, and draws players from nearby towns and villages as well as from the city. In 2021, twenty players from Moradabad were selected for the zonal final of Uttar Pradesh Under 25 Ranji team. In 2022, two of the city's players were selected for the Uttar Pradesh cricket team in the Ranji Trophy. In 2023, eleven women cricketers were selected from Moradabad for the Under-23 trials of Uttar Pradesh women's cricket team.

Football, basketball, volleyball, and kabaddi are other popular games in the city. In March 2024, three players from the city were selected for a national football camp set up to select players for the first Indian Under-20 Men's Football Championship. Two players from Moradabad were selected for the regional Kabaddi team in 2022 for a state-level Kabaddi championship in Jhansi. In 2021 Moradabad's Kabaddi team won a state-level Kabaddi championship organised by the Youth Games Association.

== Culture ==
Moradabad has a rich cultural heritage and legacy of peaceful Hindu-Muslim coexistence. This culture, called Ganga-Jamuni tehzeeb, has been shaped by a fusion of ideas and values from both religions for centuries. Residents of modern Moradabad carry this legacy forward by living, studying, working, and enjoying festivals together. There are places of worship in the city that are more than a hundred years old, including the Old Central Methodist Church, Jama Masjid, and several temples.

Some

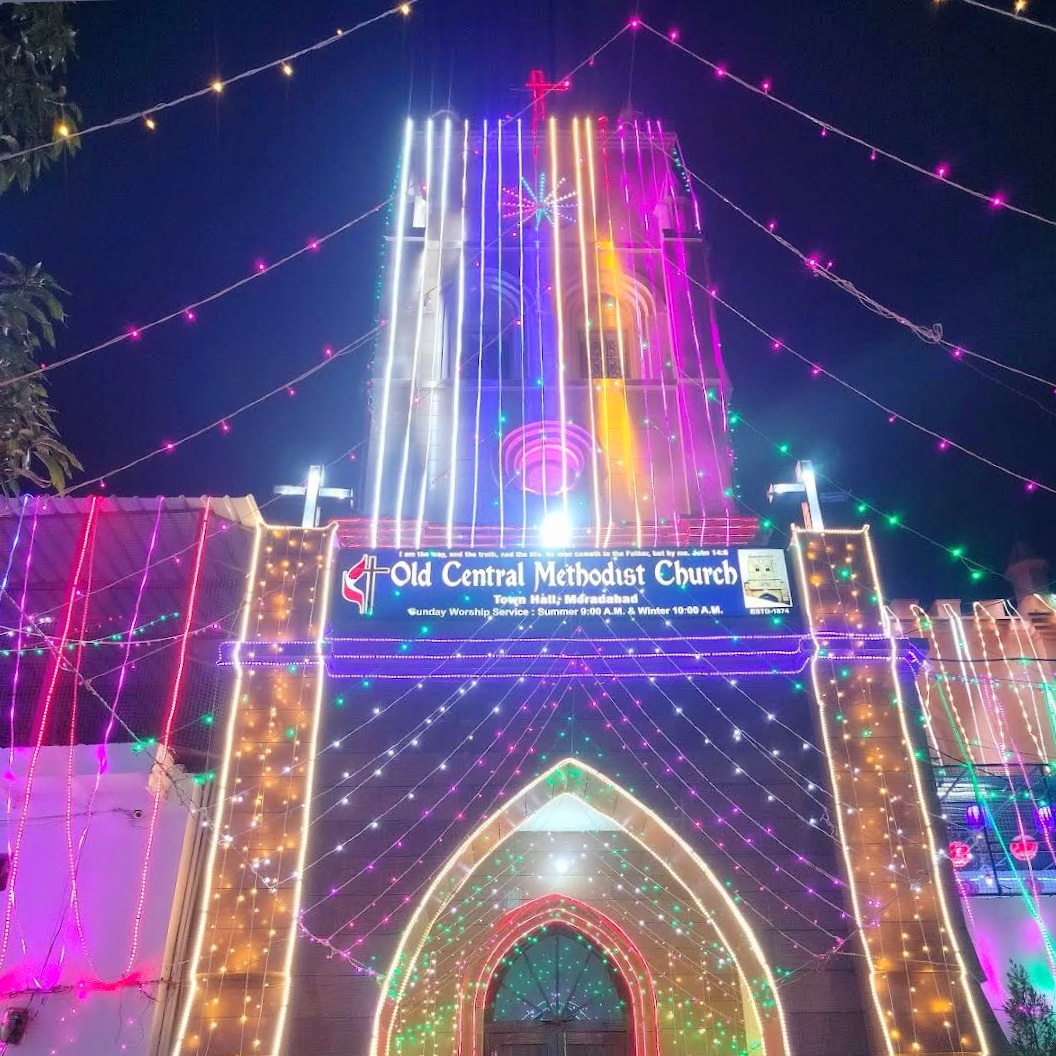
Old Central Methodist Church, built in 1874

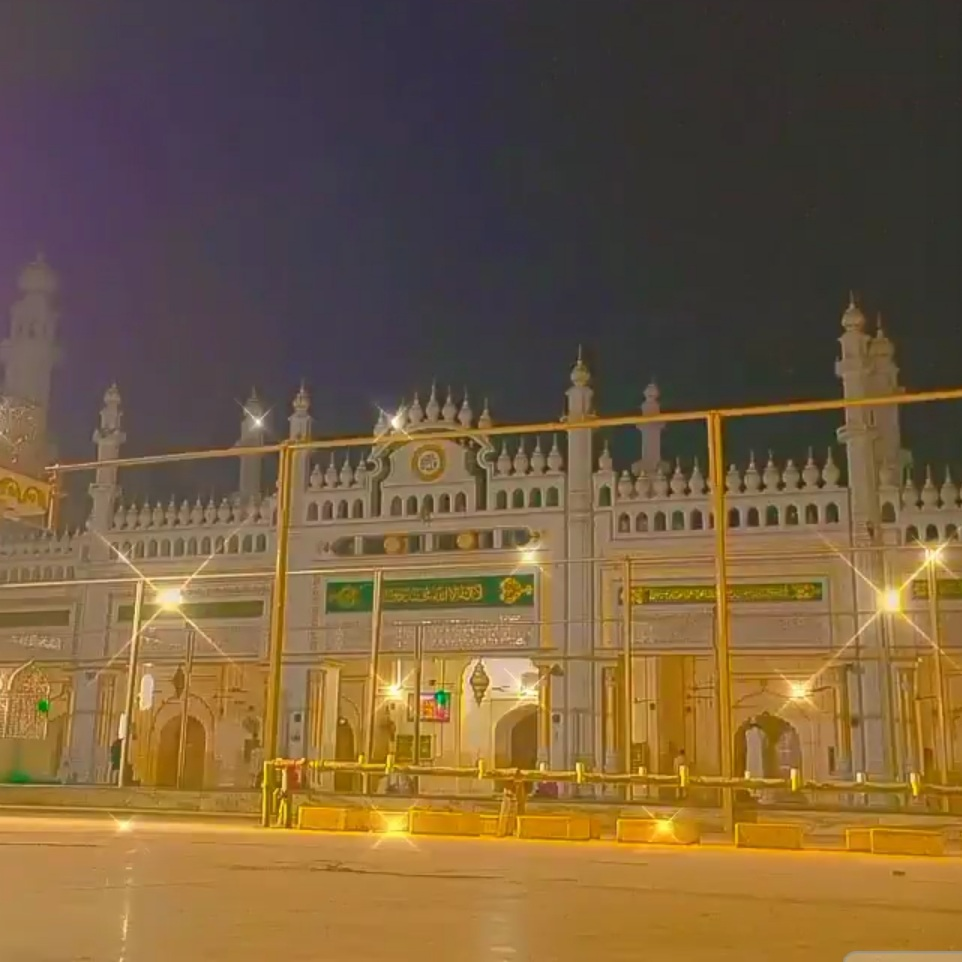
Jama Masjid, built in 1637

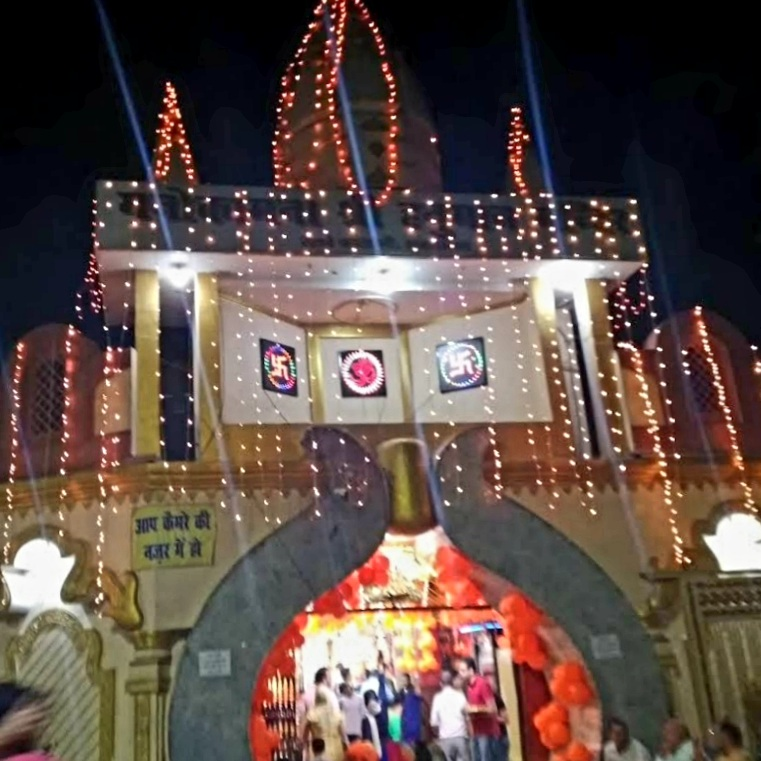
Prachin Hanuman Mandir, built at least 100 years ago

=== Arts and literature ===
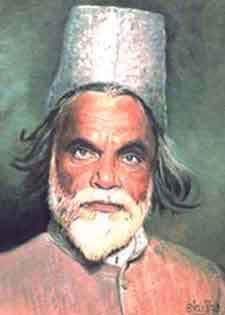
A portrait of Jigar Moradabadi, a prominent twentieth-century poet

As the Brass City, Moradabad has produced artisans and craftspeople who are skilled at decorating brass items with complex textures and designs. This includes Padma Shri awardees Ustad Dilshad Hussain and Babu Ram Yadav, whose brass products have been exhibited at exhibitions across the country and given to the heads of other states. For instance, in 2022 Prime Minister Narendra Modi gave a kalasha decorated with the artwork of Ustad Dilshad Hussain to German Chancellor Olaf Scholz at the G7 Summit in Italy. Ustad Dilshad was invited to display his decorated brassware items at the 2023 G20 New Delhi summit.

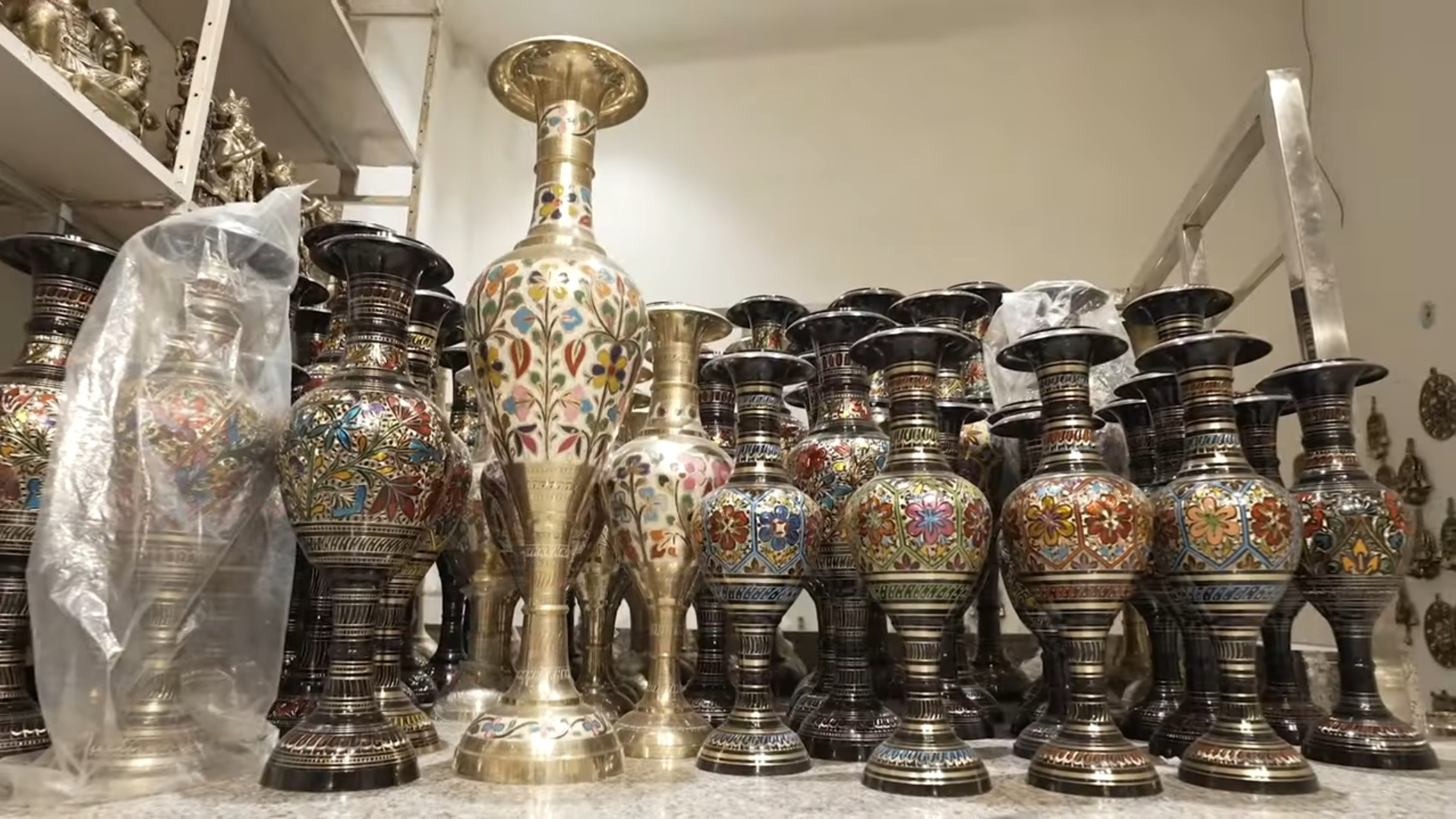
Designer flower pots created by the artisans of Moradabad in a showroom

Poets, singers and artists have lived in the city. This includes Hindi poet and humourist Hullad Moradabadi, who was known for his plays, films and books, Jigar Moradabadi, an Urdu poet known for his Sufi poems, and Jwala Prasad Mishra, author and editor of classical Sanskrit texts.

Mushairas, qawwalis and Hindi stage plays and acts are performed in the city. People who have taken part in these events include Munawwar Rana, Mehshar Afridi, Juhi Babbar, Sonu Nigam, Guru Randhawa and Sunidhi Chauhan.

In literature, the historic library maintained by the city's corporation has many books that are more than a hundred years old. Among them are Urdu translations of Hindu scriptures Bhagavad Gita and Gitanjali, which many Muslims also go to read and learn from. Urdu translators from the city, such as Hakim Muhsin Faruqi, translated popular foreign literature such as The Adventures of Sherlock Holmes into Urdu during the early twentieth century.

=== Cuisine ===
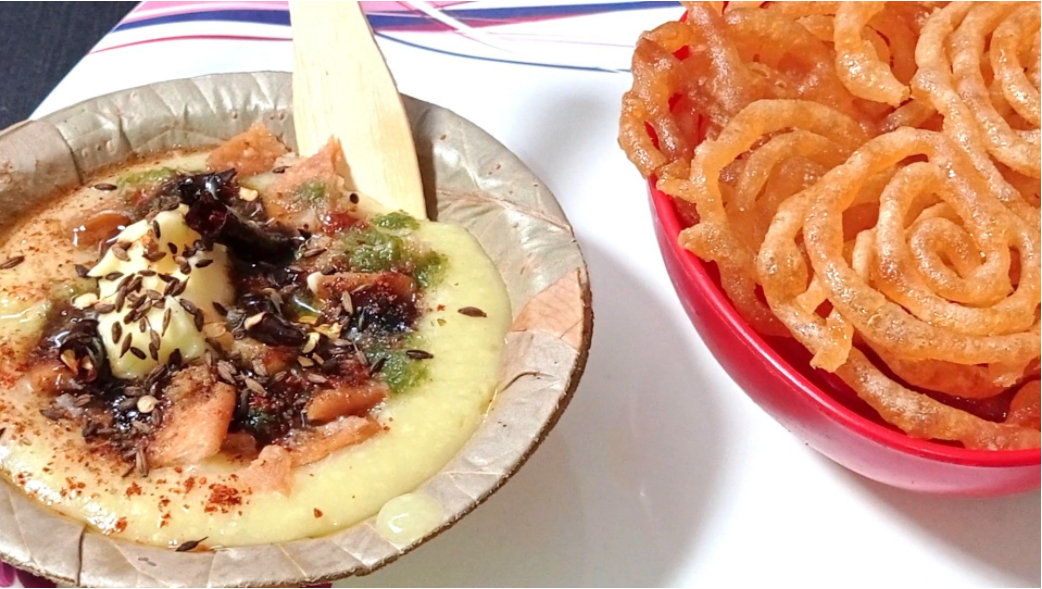
Moradabadi Daal and Jalebis

Moradabad's cuisine is a fusion of its Rajput and Mughlai roots. Mughal Prince Murad Bakhsh is known for blending the two cultures, which included blending their foods as well. The result was a diverse cusine including vegetarian and non-vegetarian dishes in equal parts. Two of the most popular dishes are Moradabadi Moong dal and Moradabadi biryani. There is a tale that Prince Muradh Bakhsh was so fond of the Muradabadi dal that he used to have it several times a day, each time spiced differently. That tradition of garnishing and serving the Moradabadi dal with different flavours like lemon juice, chaat powder, coriander leaves and green chillies still exists.

Other dishes in the city include seekh kebabs, jalebis, samosas, mutton korma, Moradabadi gosht and Moradabadi paneer makhani. All these dishes can be found on street food stalls and in restaurants.

The dishes in Muradabadi cuisine derive their taste from the use of brass vessels and whole spices, such as khada garam masala and raw onions, to cook the food. Brass vessels preserve the natural taste of dishes by distributing heat evenly and preventing burning, and whole spices add to the aroma and taste. Moradabad is also credited for introducing the first iteration of chaat masala to the country.

== Education ==
=== Higher education ===
Moradabad is a major education hub in the western UP region with public as well as private higher education institutions. For technical education, it has a government polytechnic and private institutions like the Moradabad Institute of Technology (MIT) and RSD Academy College of Management and Technology, both affiliated to Dr. A.P.J. Abdul Kalam Technical University. For arts, sciences, and professional courses it has colleges affiliated to the Mahatma Jyotiba Phule Rohilkhand University, Bareilly, which include. These include Hindu College and Kedarnath Girdharilal Khatri College.

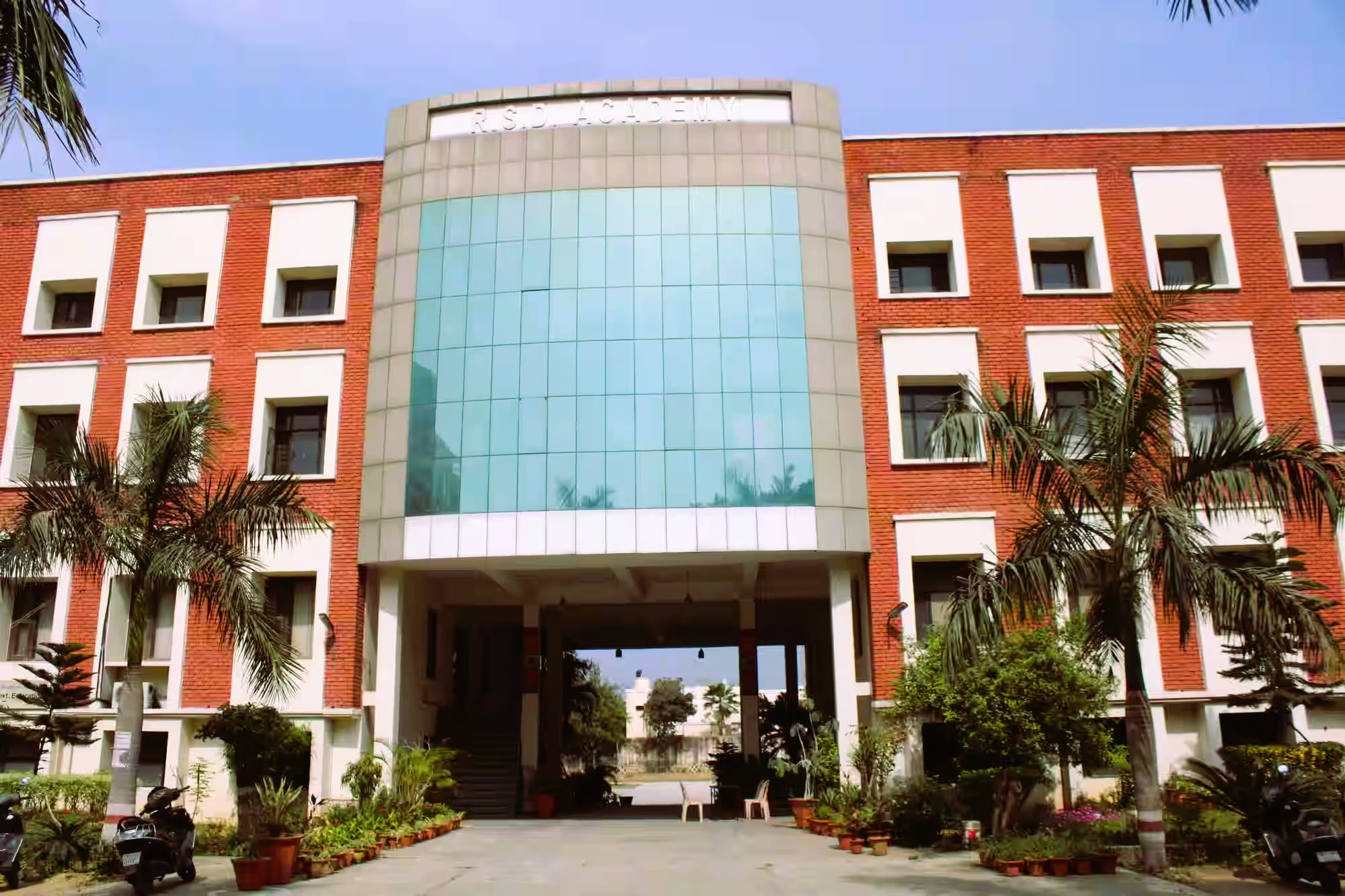
A view of the RSD Academy, Moradabad

The city has two private universities: Teerthanker Mahaveer University and the IFTM University, both of which provide higher education in management and technology-related fields.

There are several institutes for training in medicine, pharmacy and dentistry.

A government university,Guru Jambheshwar University, is under construction in the city. Its first academic session started in 2025.

=== Schools ===
Schools in Moradabad include the Methodist Girls Inter College and the Parker Inter College. Most of the city's schools are affiliated with the Central Board of Secondary Education, the Council for the Indian School Certificate Examinations or, for the Hindi-medium schools, the Uttar Pradesh State Board of High School and Intermediate Education. There is also a Kendriya Vidyalaya Sangathan in the city.

=== Police training institutions ===
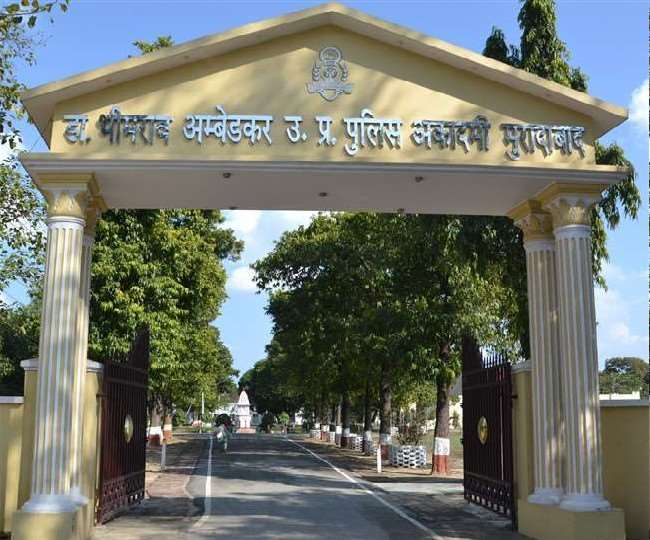
Police Academy in Moradabad

Moradabad has three of the nine police training institutions in Uttar Pradesh. These include:

- Dr. Bhim Rao Ambedkar Police Academy: Named for the architect of Indian constitution, it was established in Prayagraj in 1878 by the British administration as a Police Training School (PTS). It was shifted to Moradabad in 1901, and police officers from other areas were also trained there. It was upgraded to a Police Training College (PTC) in 1934. In 1997 it became a Police Training Academy under its current name. It was awarded Union Home Ministry's trophy for Best Police Training Institution (Central Zone) in 2022.
- Police Training College (PTC): Established in 1968 as a Recruit Training Centre (RTC), it was upgraded to a Police Training College in 1978.
- Police Training School (PTS): Originally affiliated to Dr. BR Ambedkar Police Academy, it became an independent institution in 1986 with its own budget.

These institutions make Moradabad the largest hub of police training in the state. The Police Training Academy is the only police academy for probation of Indian Police Services (IPS) officers assigned to the UP cadre. It is also the only academy in the state for training State Police Service Gazetted officers, those above the rank of Deputy Superintendent or DSP. Non-gazetted police officers are also trained here. It has a capacity of training 60 gazetted and 280 non-gazetted officers every year. The Police Training College trains the sub-inspector rank police officers. It can train 600 sub-inspectors every year. The Police Training School trains the head constables and constables and can train 400 head constables every year.

== Provincial Armed Constabulary (PAC) ==
The western zone headquarters of Uttar Pradesh Provincial Armed Constabulary (PAC) are in Moradabad. This is a specialised force under the Uttar Pradesh Police, and can tackle serious law and order situations without having to call in the army. It includes the 9th, 23rd and 24th vahinis, or battalions, of the PAC in the city. The 8th battalion PAC of Bareilly also falls under its jurisdiction. It is sent to states as far away as Gujarat. during elections.

Together with PAC and a Range headquarters, Moradabad has the largest establishment of UP Police after Lucknow.

== Transport ==
=== Public transport ===
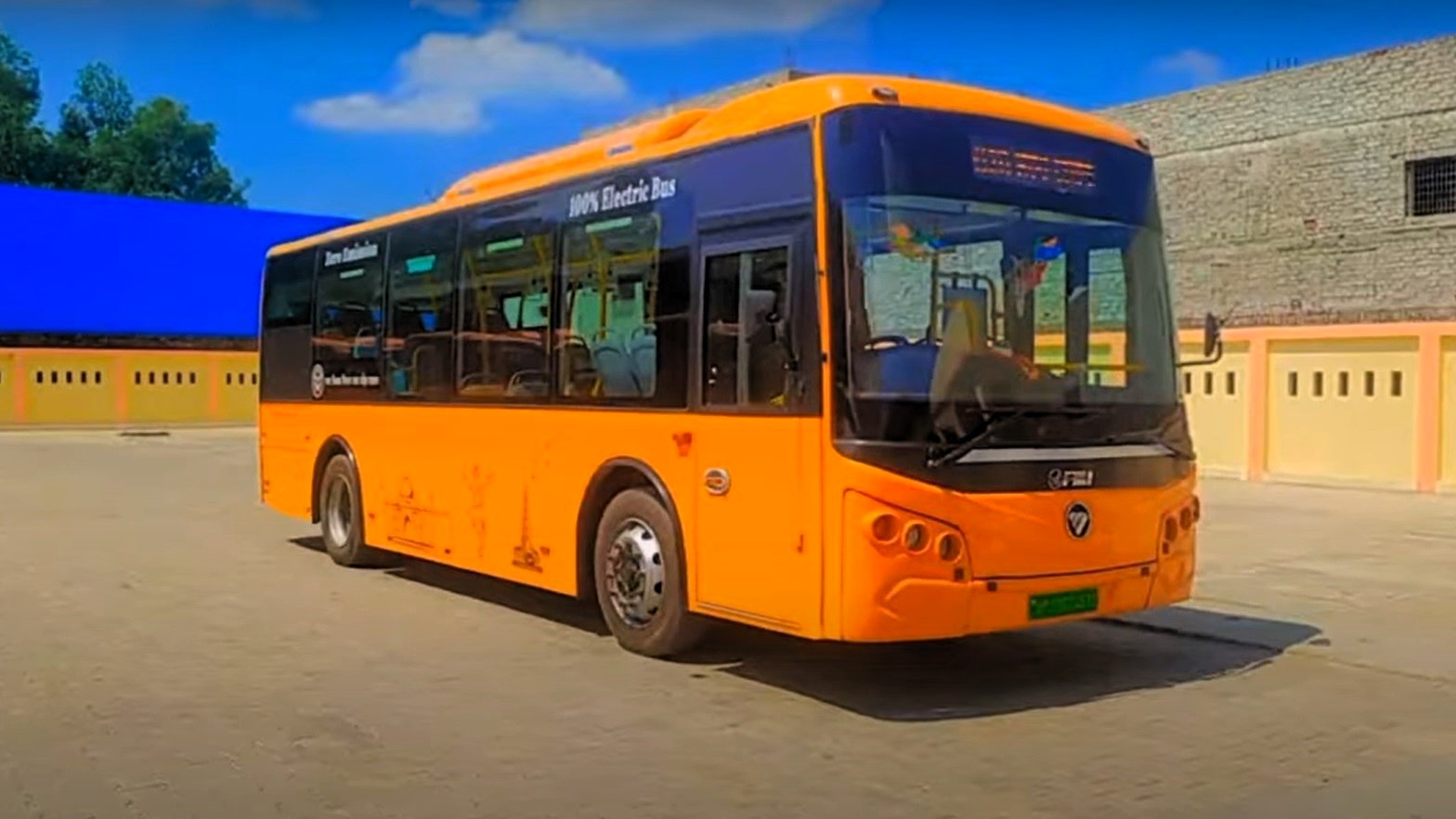
An electric bus at a charging station in Moradabad

Moradabad's public transport system largely relies on auto rickshaws, e-rickshaws, and electric city buses. While the first two have been taking people around the city for decades, electric city buses were launched in 2022. Besides being eco-friendly, these buses are air-conditioned and economical as one can travel in them for a distance of 3 km for 10 INR. Routes for e-buses are limited so people primarily use auto rickshaws or e-rickshaws to move around. Bike taxi aggregator service Rapido also operates in the city.

=== Road ===
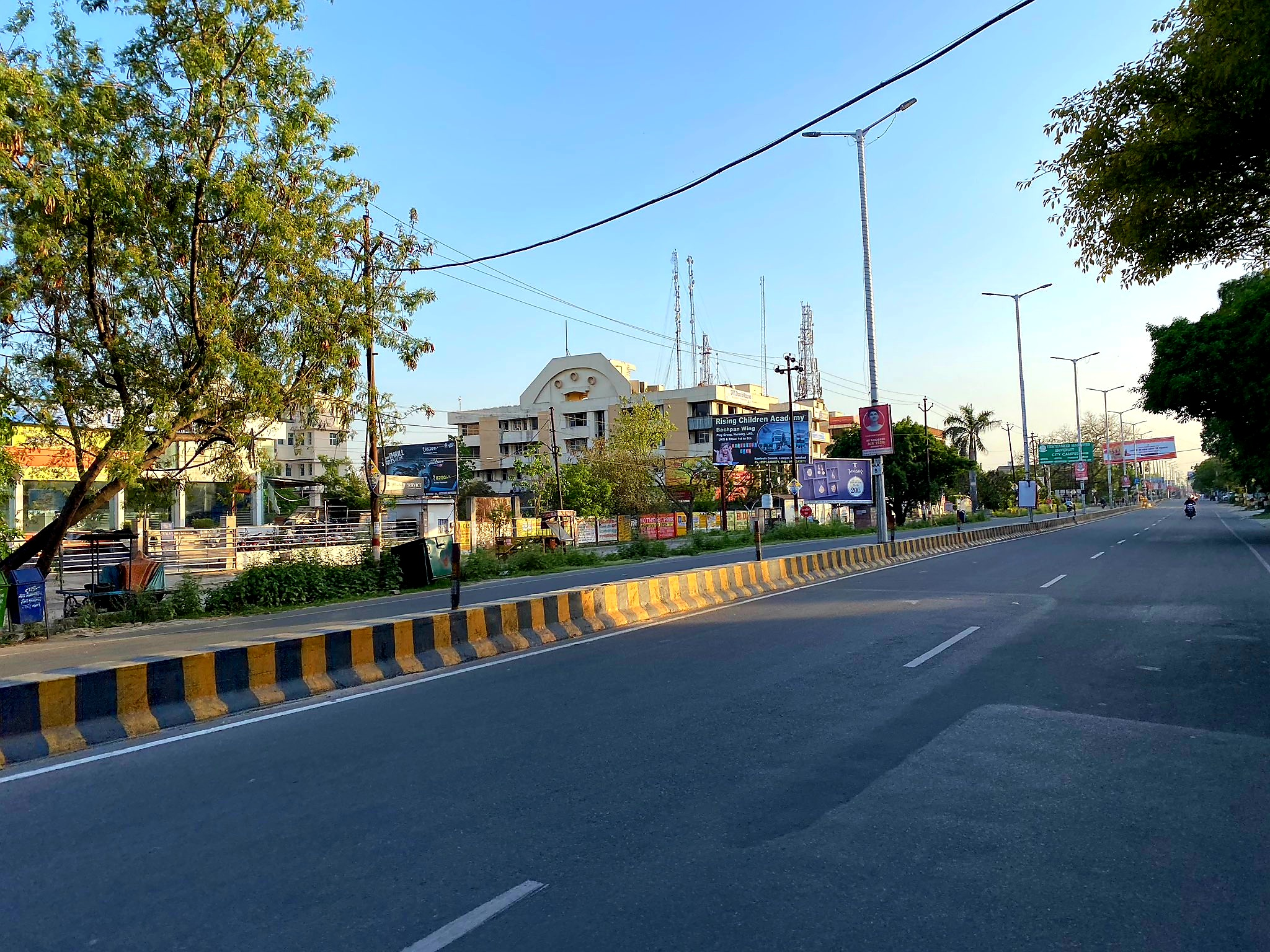
A section of NH 9 in Moradabad (Delhi road)

Moradabad is well-connected to all the cities in UP and most of the major cities in other states through an extensive road network. The following National Highways and State Highways pass through or are connected with Moradabad:

- National Highway 9 – Made by merging the sections of National Highway 10, 24, 87, 74 and 125, this highway connects New Delhi to Lucknow via Ghaziabad, Shahjahanpur and Sitapur. The Hapur-Moradabad stretch of this highway was six-laned in 2022. It is essentially from Delhi via Ghaziabad and Moradabad to Rampur. Part of this highway is also a part of the AH2 (Asian Highway 2), which connects Denpasar, Indonesia to Merak and Singapore to Khosravi, Iran.

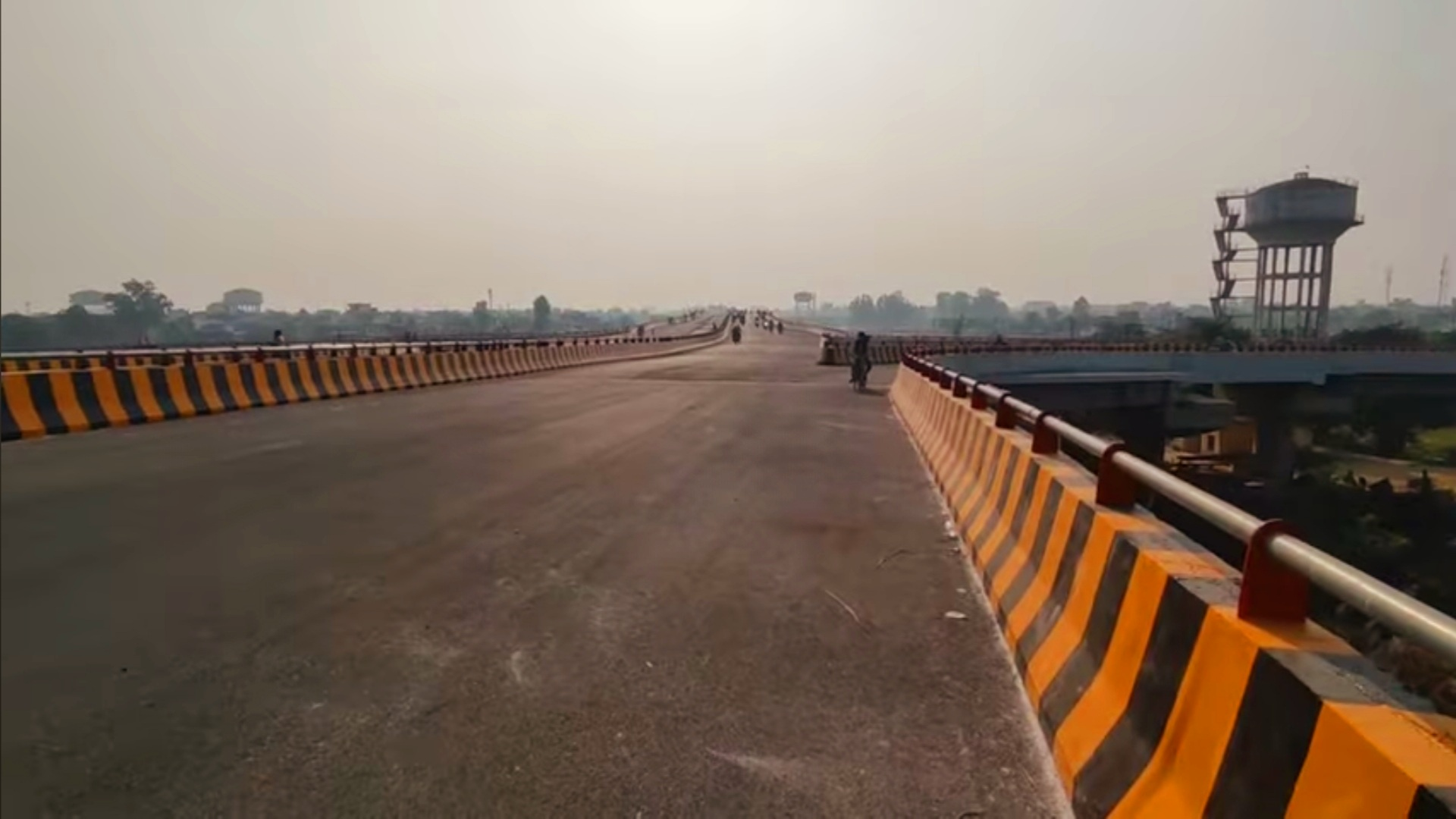
Sonakpur Railway Overbridge (ROB) connecting Kanth Road to Delhi Road on NH 9

- National Highway 509 – Previously known as National Highway 93, it connects Moradabad to Agra via Chandausi, Babrala, Aligarh and Hathras.
- National Highway 734 – connects Moradabad to Najibabad via Nagina and Kashipur, Uttrakhand. Prime minister Narendra Modi had laid the foundation stone for its four-laning in January 2022, and Union Minister of Road and Transport Nitin Gadkari sanctioned the upgradation work in November 2022.
- State Highway 43 – connects Moradabad to the historical city of Badaun and Farrukhabad via Chandausi. It also extends all the way to Kanpur through SH 148 and NH 34 in Bulandshahar.
- State Highway 49 – connects Moradabad to Haridwar and Dehradun, merging into state highway 76.
- State Highway 76 – connects Moradabad to Bijnor via Noorpur, and goes all the way to Meerut through NH 34.
- State Highway 78 – connects Moradabad to Amroha via Pakbara, merging into state highway 145.
- State Highway 125 – connects to Bareilly via Rampur and Bilari.
- State Highway 145 – connects to Amroha via Dhanaura and Thakurdwara.
- State Highway 147– connects to Jaspur via Chandpur and Thakurdwara.
- State Highway 148 – connecting to Bulandshahar via Sambhal, joins into NH 34 in Bulandshahar.
- MD 65 W – connects Moradabad to Kashipur via Thakurdwara.
- Moradabad–Sambhal four-lane highway.

=== Rail ===
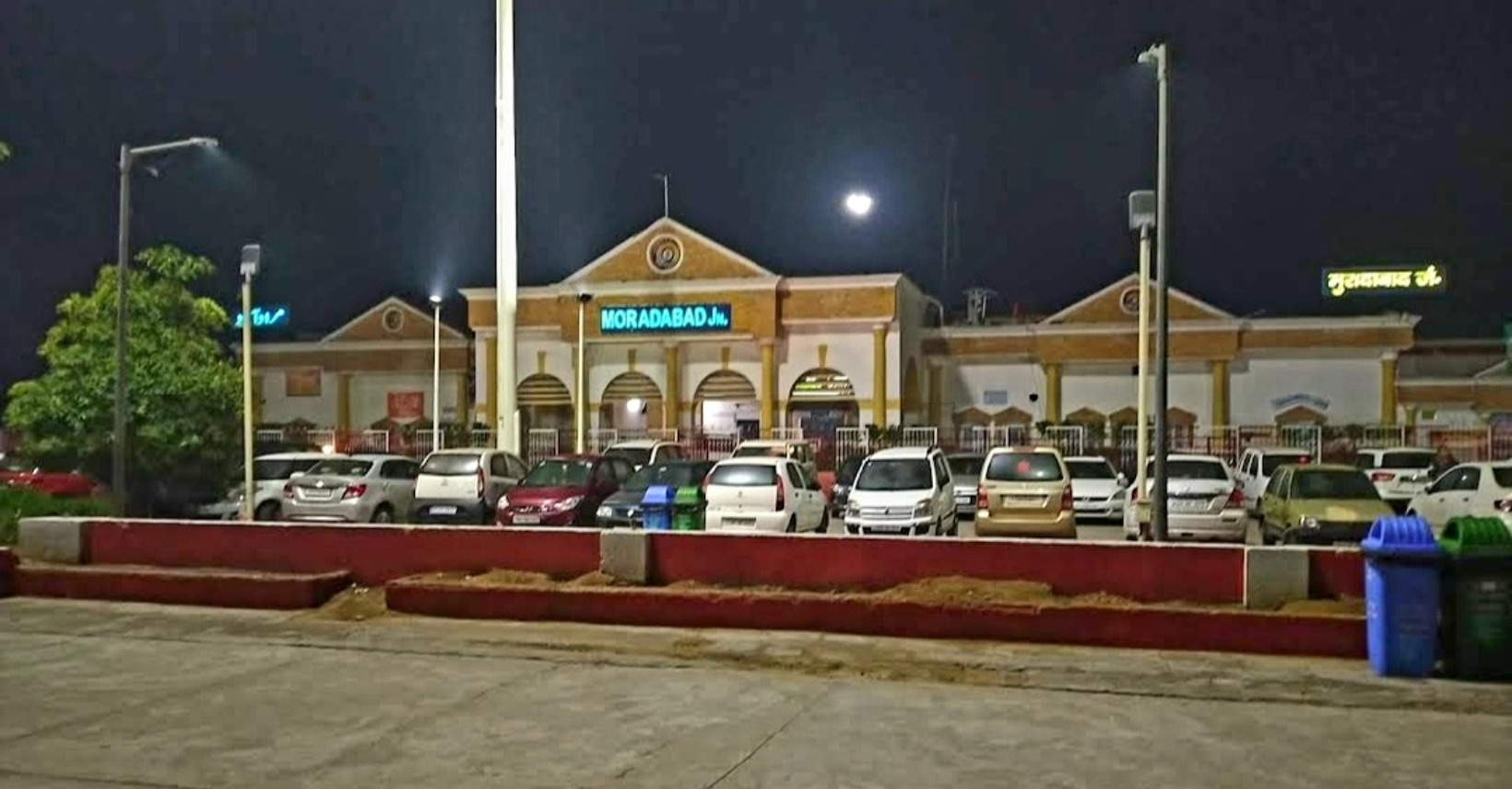
Moradabad railway station

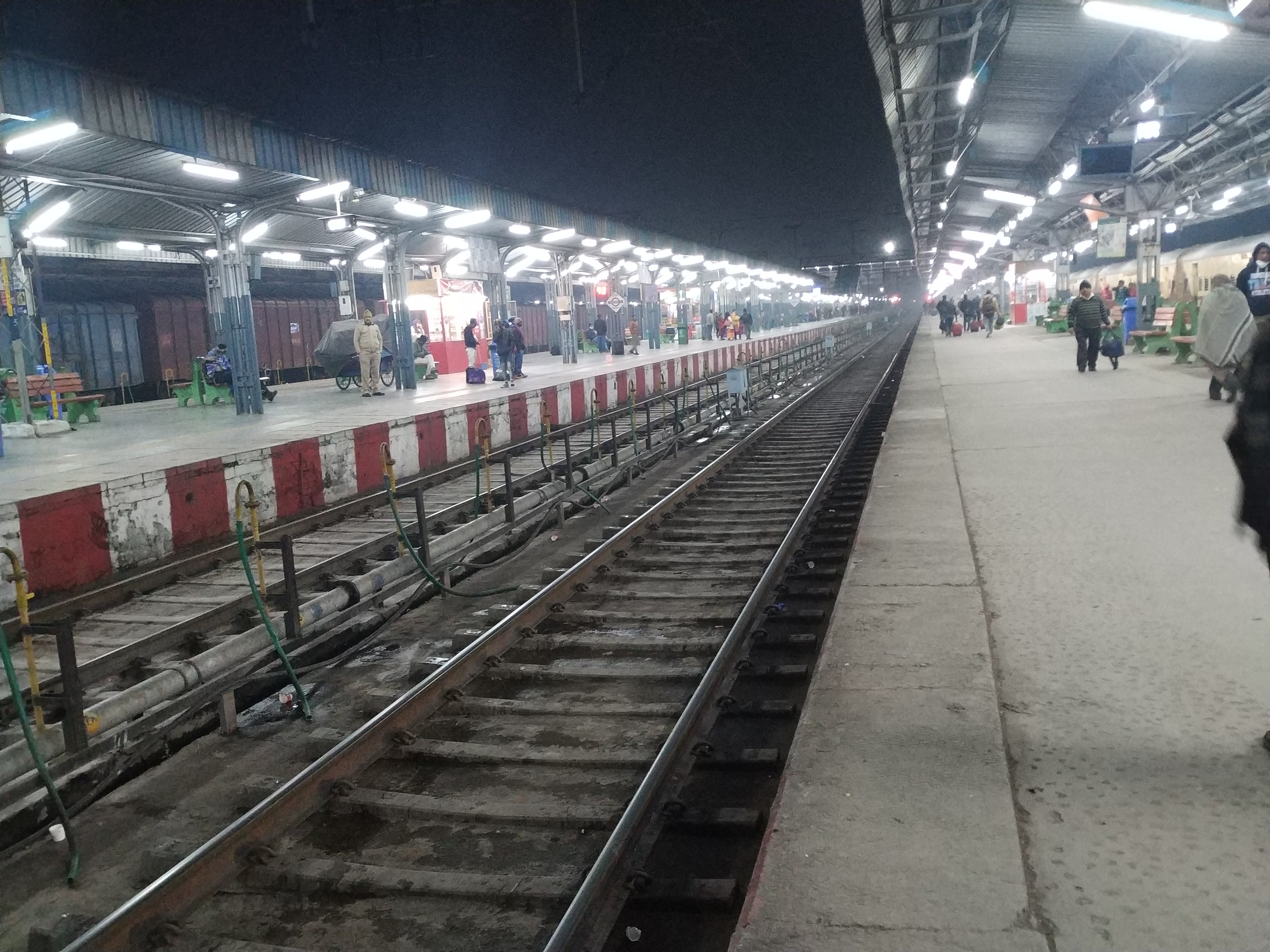
Inside Moradabad junction railway station

Moradabad railway station is one of the major railway stations of Indian Railways. Built in 1873 and electrified in 2012, it is one of the oldest railway stations of India. It has seven platforms, and is on Lucknow-Moradabad line, Delhi-Moradabad line, and Moradabad-Ambala line. It is an inter-change station due to a five-line junction.

The station has a double railway line for Delhi, Lucknow, Punjab, and Dehradun directions. More than 250 trains pass through and stop at the station every day. It is directly connected with Delhi, Mumbai, Lucknow, Kanpur, Agra, Aligarh, Ghaziabad, Jaipur, Jodhpur, Haridwar, Amritsar, Ludhiana, Ambala, Guwahati, Dibrugarh, Kolkata, Jamshedpur, Varanasi, Ahmedabad, Patna. 13 trains originate and terminate at the station. All trains passing through the station stop here for 5-10 mins on average, including Shatabdi Express, Rajdhani Express, Vande Bharat, Garib-Rath, and Double-Decker. It has a quadruple electric line with four parallel tracks, which allows faster trains to overtake the slower ones. All the railway track is electrified.

Moradabad railway station was the main station built by Oudh and Rohilkhand Railway. It is a category 'A' railway station. It has free Wi-Fi, escalators, an Indian Railway Catering and Tourism Corporation canteen, a tourist information centre, post office, telegraph office, General Railway Police Office, computerised reservation counters, retiring room, refreshment rooms, a tea stall, a bookstall, and Tatkal reservation counters.

=== Air ===
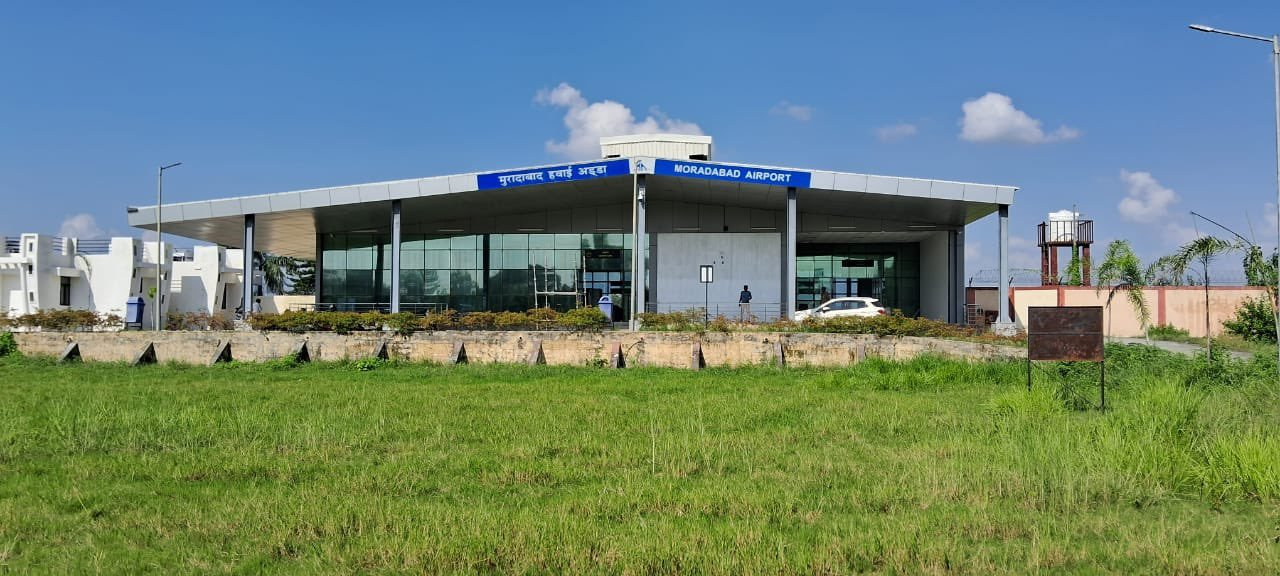
Moradabad Airport

Moradabad has a domestic airport, Moradabad Airport, about 18 km from the city center. As of 2024, it provides connectivity to state capital Lucknow with small 19-seater flights three days in the week. Other cities are yet to be connected via air route.

The Bareilly Airport is about 80 km from Moradabad; it is connected to Mumbai, New Delhi and Bengaluru via direct flights. The nearest international airport is Indira Gandhi International Airport, New Delhi (around 178 km away).

== Media ==
Newspapers published in Moradabad include Dainik Jagran, Amar Ujala, Rajasthan Patrika, Hindustan, and Moradabad Pages.

== Environmental issues ==
=== Floods ===
Moradabad has a history of floods due to the overflow of Ramganga river. The water discharged from the Ramganga Dam in Kalagarh led to severe flooding in 2010, with flood water entering people's homes even in some of its most posh localities. There has not been a severe flood in the city since then, but the risk remains every year whenever it rains more than usual and rural areas on the banks of Ramganga river are submerged.

=== Pollution ===
As an industrial city undergoing rapid transformation, Moradabad faces the challenge of pollution. With a maximum of 114 decibels (db), the city is the second most noise-polluted city in the world according to a United Nations Environment Program report published in 2022. In 2021, it was also the most air-polluted city in the country outside the National Capital Region (NCR).

The city has been working to improve this. In 2022, it won the first prize among 44 cities with a population of 0.3–1 million for reducing the PM10 concentration by 36% in the Swachh Vayu Survekshan of the Central Pollution Control Board (CPCB). The following year, in 2023, it was ranked second, and in 2024 eleventh in the same survey for its air quality.

== Notable people ==
- Ponty Chadha, businessperson
- Piyush Chawla, Indian cricketer
- S. T. Hasan, MP of Moradabad
- Mohsin Khan, IPL cricketer
- Nawab Majju Khan, freedom fighter and commander of the Mughal emperor Bahadur Shah Zafar
- Sabih Khan, chief operating officer at Apple Inc
- Shoaib Sultan Khan, pioneer of rural development programmes
- Arun Lal, retired Indian cricketer
- Hullad Moradabadi, Hindi poet, humourist and satirist
- Jigar Moradabadi, aka Ali Sikandar, Urdu poet and ghazal writer
- Naeem-ud-Deen Muradabadi, jurist, scholar and mufti
- Zaki Muradabadi, Indian Urdu poet, writer
- Sufi Amba Prasad, nationalist and pan-Islamist leader
- Round2hell, YouTubers
- Kunwar Sarvesh, former MP of Moradabad
- Naina Singh, actor
- Robert Vadra, businessman and husband of Priyanka Gandhi

== See also ==
- Rohtak
- Gurgaon
- Meerut
- New Moradabad
- Fatanpur, Moradabad
- 1888 Moradabad hailstorm
- 1980 Moradabad riots
