= Fatanpur =

Fatanpur may refer to:

- Fatanpur, Moradabad, a village in Uttar Pradesh, India
- Fatanpur, Pratapgarh, a village in Pratapgarh district, Uttar Pradesh, India
