= Nawab Majju Khan =

Indian freedom fighter (died 1858)

Shaheede Aazam Nawab Majiduddin Khan
- Born: Nawab Majiduddin Khan
- Died: 25 April 1858; Galshaheed, Moradabad, India
- Resting place: Moradabad, India
- Title: Nawab

Nawab Majju Khan or Nawab Majiduddin Khan s/o Nawab Mohammed Uddin Ahmed Khan alias Mohammed Mian was a rebel and the real Ruler of Moradabad and among the early freedom fighters of India in 1857. He was executed by the British government in 1858.

== Life ==
In 1857, Nawab Majju Khan of Moradabad, who served as the commander of the last Mughal emperor Bahadur Shah Zafar, achieved a significant victory over the British army. Fearing Majju Khan, the British were forced to retreat and seek refuge in the hills of Nainital. However, in 1858, the British launched another attack on Moradabad with the assistance of the Nawab of Rampur. Despite putting up a brave fight once again, Nawab Majju Khan was unable to emerge victorious this time. Tragically, under General Jone's brigade, he was hanged and martyred on April 25, 1858 by the British forces.

== Execution ==
Following the execution of Nawab Majju Khan, the British authorities sought to instill fear in the residents of Moradabad by attaching his body to an elephant and parading it through the city streets. Subsequently, his remains were interred in Imli tree, situated near the Puttan Shaheed Masjid. Suspended from a tree, the tamarind tree in the graveyard continues to serve as a poignant reminder of their sacrifice.

== Legacy ==
The Swatantra Sangram Senani Bhavan stands in the Civil Lines area, serving as a tribute to those who fought in Moradabad. Additionally, within the Company Bagh, there is a Martyr Memorial and a gate was erected in honor of Nawab Majju Khan.

== Bibliography ==
- Lady Anne Blunt in the Middle East: Travel, Politics and the Idea of Empire
