= Fatanpur, Moradabad =

Fatanpur is a village situated about 30 km (18.6 miles) southwest of Moradabad in Uttar Pradesh, India. This village was established by Dahiya Jats from the Haryana State of India. The Jat clan of that area now comprises the Dahiyas, Amit, Arvind, Pradeep, Pavan, Deepak, Sonu, Sanklan, Tobias, Maliks, and Jatranas. The other castes found there are Saini, Thakur(nai), and Harijans. Most of this village's population is dependent on agriculture. The NREGA scheme is in progress in the village and many of the boys there have joined the Indian Armed Forces in recent years.

Fatanpur is located 2 km (1.2 miles) west from the Moradabad to Kashipur highway that comes from Kisan Inter College in Jahangirpur, Moradabad.

There is a large pond that is located north of the village, as well as a public school, which is the only educational institution in the area's vicinity. All of the streets are made of brick, while the main road leading to the village is made in the Pradhan Mantri Gram Sarak Yojana Fatanpur.

According to 2011 Census data, the total geographical area of Fatanpur is 124.22 hectares (307 acres) and has a population of 627 people. The village consists of approximately 128 houses. The literacy rate in the village is 76.35%, according to the 2011 census. Male literacy is 85.27% and Female literacy is 65.23%. Fatanpur Village is administered by the Sarpanch, the "head of village," an elected representative. Thakurdwara is the closest population centre to Fatanpur which is 20 km(12.4 miles) away.
