= New Moradabad =

- Township
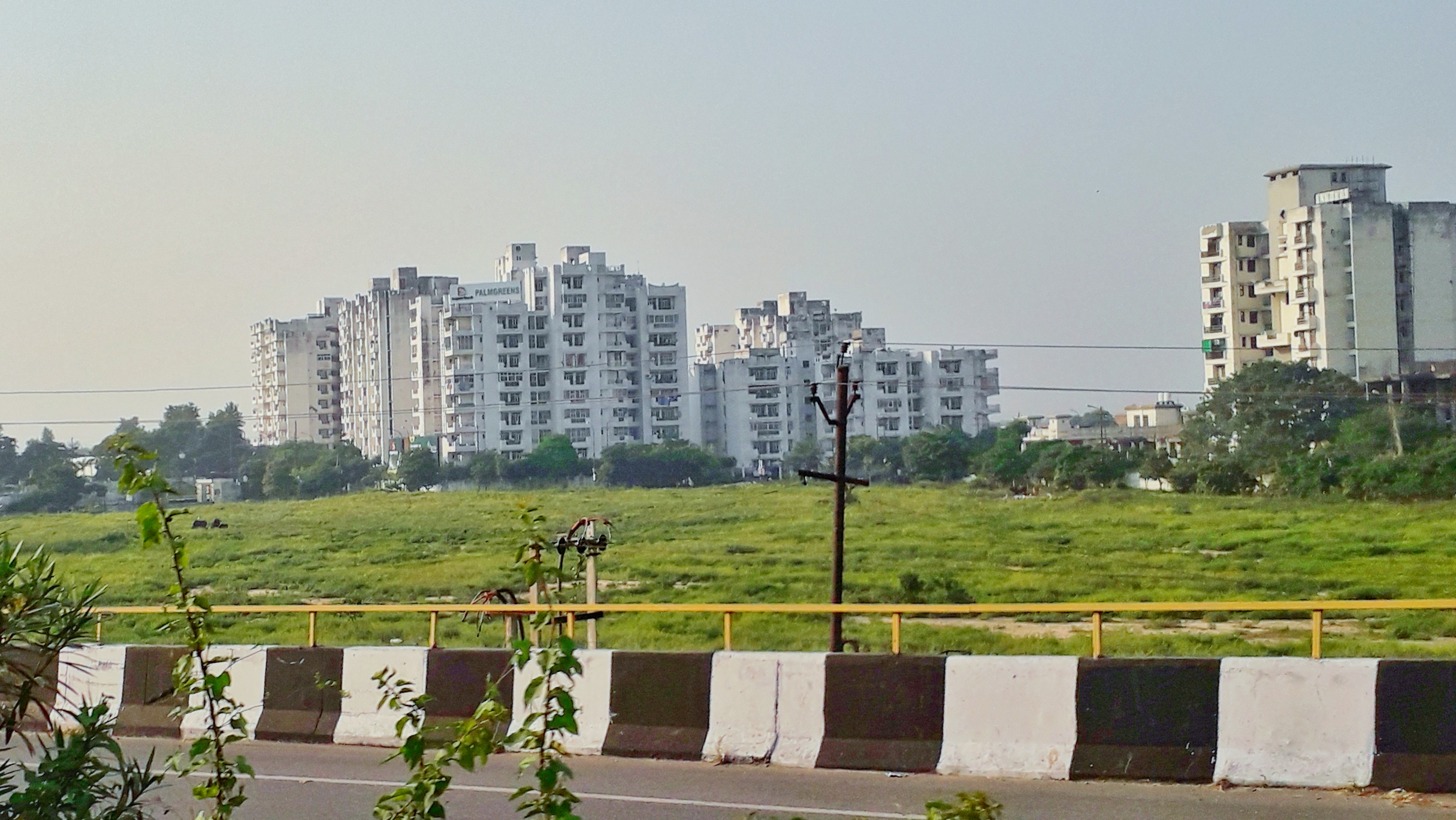
- New Moradabad Skyline from NH 24

- Location within Uttar Pradesh Location within India
- Coordinates: 28.832°N 78.695°E
- Country: India
- State: Uttar Pradesh
- District: Moradabad

Area
  - Total: 3.6 km^{2} (1.4 sq mi)

Languages
  - Official: Hindi, English
- Time zone: UTC+5:30 (IST)
- PIN: 244001

New Moradabad is a township in Moradabad district, Uttar Pradesh, India, developed by the Moradabad Development Authority. The township is spread on more than 800 acres of land.

== See also ==
- Civil Lines, Moradabad
