= Zaki Muradabadi =

Indian Urdu poet

- Born: Moradabad, Uttar Pradesh, India
- Other name: Zaki Muradabadi Dehlvi
- Occupations: poet, writer, and critic

Zaki Muradabadi (Urdu: ذکی مرادآبادی, Hindi: ज़की मुरादाबादी) also known as Zaki Muradabadi Dehlvi, was an Indian Urdu poet, writer, and critic from India.

== Early life and birth ==
Zaki's father ' Ali and his ancestors belonged to Lucknow, but he was born in Moradabad and lived there for most of his life. He was receiving pension from Rampur state of Nawab Muhammad Saeed Khan for a long time He was born in 1930. Zaki belonged to a family with a literary background, which greatly influenced his passion for poetry and literature.

== Career ==
He was highly regarded for his contributions to Urdu literature, particularly his poetry. He wrote ghazals, nazms, and other forms of Urdu poetry. His poetry often explored themes such as love, longing, mysticism, and the human condition. Zaki's works were characterized by their depth of emotion, intricate imagery, and linguistic beauty.

In addition to his poetry, he was also known for his critical essays and literary analyses. He played a significant role in promoting Urdu literature and preserving its rich literary heritage.

== Bibliography ==
- Mohani, Hasrat. Intikhab-e-Deewan-e-Zaki Muradabadi (in Urdu). Aligarh: Urdu Press. ISBN 9780199061556.
