= List of members of the 8th Lok Sabha =

Members of Lok Sabha (1984-89)

This is a list of members of the 8th Lok Sabha arranged by state or territory represented. These members of the lower house of the Indian Parliament were elected to the 8th Lok Sabha (1984 to 1989) at the 1984 Indian general election.

== Andaman and Nicobar Islands ==
INC (1)

No.	Constituency	Member of Parliament	Party affiliation
1	Andaman and Nicobar Islands	Manoranjan Bhakta	Indian National Congress

== Andhra Pradesh ==
TDP (30) INC (6) ICS (1) CPI (1) CPI(M) (1) AIMIM (1) BJP (1) JP (1)

No.	Constituency	Member of Parliament	Party affiliation
1	Adilabad	C. Madhava Reddy	Telugu Desam Party
2	Amalapuram (SC)	Aithabathula J. Venkata Butchi Maheshwara Rao	Telugu Desam Party
3	Anakapalli	P. Appalanarasimham	Telugu Desam Party
4	Anantapur	D. Narayanaswami	Telugu Desam Party
5	Bapatla	Chimata Sambu	Telugu Desam Party
6	Bhadrachalam (ST)	Sode Ramaiah	Communist Party of India
7	Bobbili	Pusapati Ananda Gajapati Raju	Telugu Desam Party
8	Chittoor	N. P. Jhansi Lakshmi	Telugu Desam Party
9	Cuddapah	Dr. D. N. Reddy	Telugu Desam Party
10	Eluru	Dr. Bolla Bulli Ramaiah	Telugu Desam Party
11	Guntur	Prof. Nayakulu G. Ranga	Indian National Congress
12	Hanamkonda	Chandupatla Janga Reddy	Bharatiya Janata Party
13	Hindupur	K. Ramachandra Reddy	Telugu Desam Party
14	Hyderabad	Sultan Salahuddin Owaisi	All India Majlis-e-Ittehadul Muslimeen
15	Kakinada	Thota Gopala Krishna	Telugu Desam Party
16	Karimnagar	Juvvadi Chokka Rao	Indian National Congress
17	Khammam	J. Vengala Rao	Indian National Congress
18	Kurnool	E. Ayyapu Reddy	Telugu Desam Party
19	Machilipatnam	Kavuri Samba Siva Rao	Indian National Congress
20	Mahabubnagar	Sudini Jaipal Reddy	Janata Party
21	Medak	P. Manik Reddy	Telugu Desam Party
22	Miryalguda	Bhimreddy Narasimha Reddy	Communist Party of India (Marxist)
23	Nagarkurnool (SC)	V. Tulsi Ram	Telugu Desam Party
24	Nalgonda	M. Raghurama Reddy	Telugu Desam Party
25	Nandyal	Maddur Subba Reddy	Telugu Desam Party
26	Narasapur	Bhupathiraju Vijayakumar Raju	Telugu Desam Party
27	Narasaraopet	Katuri Narayana Swamy	Telugu Desam Party
28	Nellore (SC)	Puchalapalli Penchalaiah	Telugu Desam Party
29	Nizamabad	Tadur Bala Goud	Indian National Congress
30	Ongole	Bezawada Papi Reddy	Telugu Desam Party
31	Parvathipuram (ST)	K. C. Suryanarayana Deo Vyricherla	Indian Congress (Socialist)
32	Peddapalli (SC)	Gotte Bhoopathy	Telugu Desam Party
33	Rajahmundry (ST)	Sri Hari Rao Chundru	Telugu Desam Party
34	Rajampet	Sugavasi Palakondrayudu	Telugu Desam Party
35	Secunderabad	T. Anjaiah	Indian National Congress
36	Siddipet (SC)	Dr. G. Vijaya Rama Rao	Telugu Desam Party
37	Srikakulam	H. A. Dora	Telugu Desam Party
38	Tenali	Nissankararao Venkataratnam	Telugu Desam Party
39	Tirupati (SC)	Dr. Chinta Mohan	Telugu Desam Party
40	Vijayawada	Vadde Sobhanadreeswara Rao	Telugu Desam Party
41	Visakhapatnam	Bhattam Srirama Murthy	Telugu Desam Party
42	Warangal	Dr. T. Kalpana Devi	Telugu Desam Party

== Arunachal Pradesh ==
INC (2)

No.	Constituency	Member of Parliament	Party affiliation
1	Arunachal East	Wangpha Lowang	Indian National Congress
2	Arunachal West	Prem Khandu Thungon	Indian National Congress

== Assam ==
AGP (7) INC (5) ICS (1)

No.	Constituency	Member of Parliament	Party affiliation
1	Autonomous District (ST)	Biren Sing Engti	Indian National Congress
2	Barpeta	Ataur Rahman	Asom Gana Parishad
3	Dhubri	Abdul Hamid	Indian National Congress
4	Dibrugarh	Haren Bhumij	Indian National Congress
5	Guwahati	Dinesh Goswami	Asom Gana Parishad
6	Jorhat	Parag Chaliha	Asom Gana Parishad
7	Kaliabor	Bhadreswar Tanti	Asom Gana Parishad
8	Karimganj (SC)	Sudarsan Das	Indian Congress (Socialist)
9	Kokrajhar (ST)	Samar Brahma Choudhary	Independent
10	Lakhimpur	Gakul Saikia	Asom Gana Parishad
11	Mangaldoi	Saifuddin Ahmed	Asom Gana Parishad
12	Nowgong	Muhi Ram Saikia	Asom Gana Parishad
13	Silchar	Sontosh Mohan Dev	Indian National Congress
14	Tezpur	Bipinpal Das	Indian National Congress

== Bihar ==
INC (48) CPI (2) JP (1) LD (1) INC(J) (1) IND (1)

No.	Constituency	Member of Parliament	Party affiliation
1	Araria (SC)	Dumar Lal Baitha	Indian National Congress
2	Arrah	Bali Ram Bhagat	Indian National Congress
3	Aurangabad	Satyendra Narayan Sinha	Indian National Congress
4	Bagaha (SC)	Bhola Raut	Indian National Congress
5	Balia	Chanra Bhanu Devi	Indian National Congress
6	Banka	Manorama Singh	Indian National Congress
7	Barh	Prakash Chandra	Indian National Congress
8	Begusarai	Krishna Sahi	Indian National Congress
9	Bettiah	Dr. Manoj Pandey	Indian National Congress
10	Bhagalpur	Bhagwat Jha Azad	Indian National Congress
11	Bikramganj	Tapeshwar Singh	Indian National Congress
12	Buxar	Prof. K.K. Tewary	Indian National Congress
13	Chapra	Ram Bahadur Singh	Janata Party
14	Chatra	Yogeshwar Prasad Yogesh	Indian National Congress
15	Darbhanga	Vijay Kumar Mishra	Lok Dal
16	Dhanbad	Shankar Dayal Singh	Indian National Congress
17	Dumka (ST)	Prithvi Chand Kisku	Indian National Congress
18	Gaya (SC)	Ram Swaroop Ram	Indian National Congress
19	Giridih	Dr. Sarfaraz Ahmad	Indian National Congress
20	Godda	Prof. Salahuddin	Indian National Congress
21	Gopalganj	Kali Prasad Pandey	Independent
22	Hajipur (SC)	Ram Ratan Ram	Indian National Congress
23	Hazaribagh	Damodar Pandey	Indian National Congress
24	Jahanabad	Ramashray Prasad Singh	Communist Party of India
25	Jamshedpur	Gopeshwar	Indian National Congress
26	Jhanjharpur	Dr. G. S. Rajhans	Indian National Congress
27	Katihar	Tariq Anwar	Indian National Congress
28	Khagaria	Dr. C. S. Verma	Indian National Congress
29	Khunti (ST)	Simon Tigga	Indian National Congress
30	Kishanganj	Jamilur Rahman	Indian National Congress
30	Kishanganj	Syed Shahabuddin (Bypoll)	Janata Dal
31	Kodarma	Tilakdhari Prasad Singh	Indian National Congress
32	Lohardaga (ST)	Sumati Oraon	Indian National Congress
33	Madhepura	Mahabir Prasad Yadav	Indian National Congress
34	Madhubani	Abdul Hannan Ansari	Indian National Congress
35	Maharajganj	Krishan Pratap Singh	Indian National Congress
35	Maharajganj	Chandra Shekhar Singh (Bypoll)	Janata Dal
36	Monghyr	Deonandan Prasad Yadava	Indian National Congress
37	Motihari	Prabhawati Gupta	Indian National Congress
38	Muzaffarpur	Laliteshwar Prasad Shahi	Indian National Congress
39	Nalanda	Vijoy Kumar Yadav	Communist Party of India
40	Nawada (SC)	Kunwar Ram	Indian National Congress
41	Palamau (SC)	Kumari Kamla Kumari	Indian National Congress
42	Patna	Dr. Chandreshwar Prasad Thakur	Indian National Congress
43	Purnea	Madhuri Singh	Indian National Congress
44	Rajmahal (ST)	Seth Hembram	Indian National Congress
45	Ranchi	Shiv Prasad Sahu	Indian National Congress
46	Rosera (SC)	Ram Bhagat Paswan	Indian National Congress
47	Saharsa	Chandra Kishore Pathak	Indian National Congress
48	Samastipur	Ram Deo Rai	Indian National Congress
49	Sasaram (SC)	Jagjivan Ram	Indian National Congress (Jagjivan)
50	Sheohar	Ram Dulari Sinha	Indian National Congress
51	Singhbhum (ST)	Bagun Sumbrui	Indian National Congress
52	Sitamarhi	Ram Shreshth Khirhar	Indian National Congress
53	Siwan	Abdul Ghafoor	Indian National Congress
54	Vaishali	Kishori Sinha	Indian National Congress

== Chandigarh ==
INC (1)

No.	Constituency	Member of Parliament	Party affiliation
1	Chandigarh	Jagannath Kaushal	Indian National Congress

== Dadra and Nagar Haveli ==
IND (1)

No.	Constituency	Member of Parliament	Party affiliation
1	Dadra and Nagar Haveli (ST)	Sitaram Jivyabhai Gavali	Independent

== Daman and Diu ==
INC (1)

No.	Constituency	Member of Parliament	Party affiliation
1	Daman and Diu	Gopal Kalan Tandel	Indian National Congress

== Delhi ==
INC (7)

No.	Constituency	Member of Parliament	Party affiliation
1	Delhi Sadar	Jagdish Tytler	Indian National Congress
2	East Delhi	H. K. L. Bhagat	Indian National Congress
3	Karol Bagh (SC)	Sundarwati Nawal Prabhakar	Indian National Congress
4	New Delhi	Krishna Chandra Pant	Indian National Congress
5	North East Delhi	Jai Prakash Agarwal	Indian National Congress
6	Outer Delhi (SC)	Chaudhary Bharat Singh	Indian National Congress
7	South Delhi	Lalit Maken	Indian National Congress
7	South Delhi	Arjun Singh (1985 Bypoll)	Indian National Congress

== Goa ==
INC (2)

No.	Constituency	Member of Parliament	Party affiliation
1	Mormugao	Eduardo Faleiro	Indian National Congress
2	Panaji	Shantaram L. Naik	Indian National Congress

== Gujarat ==
INC (24) JP (1) BJP (1)

No.	Constituency	Member of Parliament	Party affiliation
1	Ahmedabad	Haroobhai Mehta	Indian National Congress
2	Amreli	Navin Ravani	Indian National Congress
3	Anand	Ishwarbhai Khodabhai Chavda	Indian National Congress
4	Banaskantha	Bheravdan Khetdangi Gadhvi	Indian National Congress
5	Baroda	Ranjit Sinh Gaekwad	Indian National Congress
6	Bhavnagar	Gigabhai Gohil	Indian National Congress
7	Broach	Ahmed Mohammed Patel	Indian National Congress
8	Bulsar (ST)	Uttambhai Harjibhai Patel	Indian National Congress
9	Chhota Udaipur (ST)	Amarsinh Rathawa	Indian National Congress
10	Dhandhuka (SC)	Narsingh Makwana	Indian National Congress
11	Dohad (ST)	Somjibhai Damor	Indian National Congress
12	Gandhinagar	G. I. Patel	Indian National Congress
13	Godhra	Jaideep Singh	Indian National Congress
13	Godhra	Shantilal Purshottamdas Patel (1988 Bypoll)	Indian National Congress
14	Jamnagar	D. P. Jadeja	Indian National Congress
15	Junagadh	Mohanbhai Laljibhai Patel	Indian National Congress
16	Kaira	Ajitsinh Dabhi	Indian National Congress
17	Kapadvanj	Natwarsinh Kesarsinh Solanki	Indian National Congress
18	Kutch	Usha Thakker	Indian National Congress
19	Mandvi (ST)	Chhitubhai Gamit	Indian National Congress
20	Mehsana	Dr. A. K. Patel	Bharatiya Janata Party
21	Patan (SC)	Punam Chand Mithabhai Vankar	Indian National Congress
22	Porbandar	Bharat Kumar Maldevji Odedra	Indian National Congress
23	Rajkot	Ramabhen Ramjibhai Mavani Patel	Indian National Congress
24	Sabarkantha	H. M. Patel	Janata Party
25	Surat	Chhaganbhai Debabhai Patel	Indian National Congress
26	Surendranagar	Dr. Pratapsinh Jala Digvijaysinh	Indian National Congress

== Haryana ==
INC (10)

No.	Constituency	Member of Parliament	Party affiliation
1	Ambala (SC)	Ram Prakash Chaudhary	Indian National Congress
2	Bhiwani	Bansi Lal	Indian National Congress
2	Bhiwani	Ram Narain Singh (1987 Bypoll)	Lok Dal
3	Faridabad	Chaudhary Rahim Khan	Indian National Congress
3	Faridabad	Khurshid Ahmed (1988 Bypoll)	Lok Dal
4	Hisar	Birender Singh	Indian National Congress
5	Karnal	Chiranji Lal Sharma	Indian National Congress
6	Kurukshetra	Harpal Singh	Indian National Congress
7	Mahendragarh	Rao Birendra Singh	Indian National Congress
8	Rohtak	Hardwari Lal	Indian National Congress
9	Sirsa (SC)	Dalbir Singh	Indian National Congress
9	Sirsa (SC)	Het Ram	Janata Dal
10	Sonepat	Dharam Pal Singh Malik	Indian National Congress

== Himachal Pradesh ==
INC (4)

No.	Constituency	Member of Parliament	Party affiliation
1	Hamirpur	Prof. Narain Chand Parashar	Indian National Congress
2	Kangra	Chandresh Kumari	Indian National Congress
3	Mandi	Sukh Ram	Indian National Congress
4	Shimla (SC)	Krishan Dutt Sultanpuri	Indian National Congress

== Jammu and Kashmir ==
INC (3) JKNC (3)

No.	Constituency	Member of Parliament	Party affiliation
1	Anantnag	Begum Akbar Jehan Abdullah	Jammu and Kashmir National Conference
2	Baramullah	Prof. Saifuddin Soz	Jammu and Kashmir National Conference
3	Jammu	Janak Raj Gupta	Indian National Congress
4	Ladakh	P. Namgyal	Indian National Congress
5	Srinagar	Abdul Rashid Kabuli	Jammu and Kashmir National Conference
6	Udhampur	Girdhari Lal Dogra	Indian National Congress

== Karnataka ==
INC (24) JP (4)

No.	Constituency	Member of Parliament	Party affiliation
1	Bagalkot	Hanumatgouda Bhimanagouda Patil	Indian National Congress
2	Bangalore North	C. K. Jaffer Sharief	Indian National Congress
3	Bangalore South	V. S. Krishna Iyer	Janata Party
4	Belgaum	Sidnal Shanmukhappa Basappa	Indian National Congress
5	Bellary	Basavarajeshwari	Indian National Congress
6	Bidar (SC)	Narsing Hulla Suryawanshi	Indian National Congress
7	Bijapur	S. M. Guraddi	Janata Party
8	Chamrajanagar (SC)	V. Sreenivasa Prasad	Indian National Congress
9	Chikballapur	V. Krishna Rao	Indian National Congress
10	Chikkodi (SC)	B. Shankaranand	Indian National Congress
11	Chikmagalur	D. K. Taradevi	Indian National Congress
12	Chitradurga	K. H. Ranganath	Indian National Congress
13	Davangere	Channaiah Odeyar	Indian National Congress
14	Dharwad North	D. K. Naikar	Indian National Congress
15	Dharwad South	Azeez Sait	Indian National Congress
16	Gulbarga	Veerendra Patil	Indian National Congress
17	Hassan	H. N. Nanje Gowda	Indian National Congress
18	Kanakapura	M. V. Chandrashekara Murthy	Indian National Congress
19	Kanara	G. Devaraya Naik	Indian National Congress
20	Kolar (SC)	Dr. V. Venkatesh	Janata Party
21	Koppal	H. G. Ramulu	Indian National Congress
22	Mandya	K. V. Shankaragowda	Janata Party
23	Mangalore	Janardhana Poojary	Indian National Congress
24	Mysore	Srikantadatta Narasimharaja Wadiyar	Indian National Congress
25	Raichur	B. V. Desai	Indian National Congress
25	Raichur	M. Y. Ghorpade (1986 Bypoll)	Indian National Congress
26	Shimoga	T. V. Chandrashekarappa	Indian National Congress
27	Tumkur	Gangasandra Siddappa Basavaraj	Indian National Congress
28	Udipi	Oscar Fernandes	Indian National Congress

== Kerala ==
INC (13) KC (2) IUML (2) JP (1) ICS (1) CPI(M) (1)

No.	Constituency	Member of Parliament	Party affiliation
1	Adoor (SC)	K. Kunjumbu	Indian National Congress
2	Alleppey	Vakkom Purushothaman	Indian National Congress
3	Badagara	K. P. Unnikrishnan	Indian Congress (Socialist)
4	Calicut	Dr. K. G. Adiyodi	Indian National Congress
5	Cannore	Mullappally Ramachandran	Indian National Congress
6	Chirayinkil	Thalekkunil Basheer	Indian National Congress
7	Ernakulam	K. V. Thomas	Indian National Congress
8	Idukki	Prof. P.J. Kurien	Indian National Congress
9	Kasaragod	I. Rama Rai	Indian National Congress
10	Kottayam	Adv. Suresh Kurup	Communist Party of India (Marxist)
11	Manjeri	Ebrahim Sulaiman Sait	Indian Union Muslim League
12	Mavelikara	Thampan Thomas	Janata Party
13	Mukundapuram	K. Mohandas	Kerala Congress
14	Muvattupuzha	George Joseph Mundackal	Kerala Congress
15	Ottapalam (SC)	K. R. Narayanan	Indian National Congress
16	Palakkad	V. S. Vijayaraghavan	Indian National Congress
17	Ponnani	Gulam Mehmood Banatwalla	Indian Union Muslim League
18	Quilon	S. Krishna Kumar	Indian National Congress
19	Thiruvananthapuram	A. Charles	Indian National Congress
20	Trichur	P. A. Antony	Indian National Congress

== Lakshadweep ==
INC (1)

No.	Constituency	Member of Parliament	Party affiliation
1	Lakshadweep (ST)	P.M. Sayeed	Indian National Congress

== Madhya Pradesh ==
INC (40)

No.	Constituency	Member of Parliament	Party affiliation
1	Balaghat	Pandit Nand Kishore Sharma	Indian National Congress
2	Bastar (ST)	Manku Ram Sodi	Indian National Congress
3	Betul	Aslam Sher Khan	Indian National Congress
4	Bhind	Krishna Singh	Indian National Congress
5	Bhopal	K.N. Pradhan	Indian National Congress
6	Bilaspur (SC)	Khelan Ram Jangde	Indian National Congress
7	Chhindwara	Kamal Nath	Indian National Congress
8	Damoh	Dal Chander Jain	Indian National Congress
9	Dhar (ST)	Pratap Singh Baghel	Indian National Congress
10	Durg	Chandulal Chandrakar	Indian National Congress
11	Gwalior	Madhavrao Scindia	Indian National Congress
12	Guna	Mahendra Singh	Indian National Congress
13	Hoshangabad	Rameshwar Neekhra	Indian National Congress
14	Indore	Prakash Chand Sethi	Indian National Congress
15	Jabalpur	Col. Ajay Narayan Mushran	Indian National Congress
16	Janjgir	Dr. Prabhat Kumar Mishra	Indian National Congress
17	Kanker (ST)	Arvind Vishram Singh Netam	Indian National Congress
18	Khajuraho	Vidyawati Chaturvedi	Indian National Congress
19	Khandwa	Kalicharan Sakargayam	Indian National Congress
20	Khargone	Subhash Yadav	Indian National Congress
21	Mahasamund	Vidya Charan Shukla	Indian National Congress
22	Mandla (ST)	Mohan Lal Jhikram	Indian National Congress
23	Mandsaur	Balkavi Bairagi	Indian National Congress
24	Morena (SC)	Kammodilal Jatav	Indian National Congress
25	Raigarh (ST)	Kumari Pushpa Devi Singh	Indian National Congress
26	Raipur	Keyur Bhushan	Indian National Congress
27	Rajgarh	Digvijaya Singh	Indian National Congress
28	Rajnandgaon	Shivendra Bahadur Singh	Indian National Congress
29	Ratlam	Dileep Singh Bhuria	Indian National Congress
30	Rewa	Martand Singh	Indian National Congress
31	Sagar (SC)	Nandlal Choudhary	Indian National Congress
32	Sarangarh (SC)	Paras Ram Bhardwaj	Indian National Congress
33	Satna	Aziz Qureshi	Indian National Congress
34	Seoni	Gargi Shankar Mishra	Indian National Congress
35	Shahdol (ST)	Dalbir Singh	Indian National Congress
36	Shajapur (SC)	Bapulal Malviya	Indian National Congress
37	Sidhi (ST)	Motilal Singh	Indian National Congress
38	Surguja (ST)	Lal Vijay Pratap Singh	Indian National Congress
39	Ujjain (SC)	Satyanarayan Pawar	Indian National Congress
40	Vidisha	Pratap Bhanu Sharma	Indian National Congress

== Maharashtra ==
INC (43) ICS (2) JP (1) PWP (1) IND (1)

No.	Constituency	Member of Parliament	Party affiliation
1	Ahmednagar	Yashwantrao Gadakh Patil	Indian National Congress
2	Akola	Madhusudan Vairale	Indian National Congress
3	Amravati	Usha Prakash Choudhari	Indian National Congress
4	Aurangabad	Sahebrao P. Dongaonkar	Indian Congress (Socialist)
5	Baramati	Sharadchandra Govindrao Pawar	Indian Congress (Socialist)
5	Baramati	Sambhajirao Sahebrao Kakade (1985 bypoll)	Janata Party
6	Beed	Kesharbai Kshirsagar	Indian National Congress
7	Bhandara	Keshaorao Atmaramji Pardhi	Indian National Congress
8	Bombay North	Anoopchand Khimchand Shah	Indian National Congress
9	Bombay North Central	Sharad Dighe	Indian National Congress
10	Bombay North East	Gurudas Kamat	Indian National Congress
11	Bombay North West	Sunil Dutt	Indian National Congress
12	Bombay South	Murli Deora	Indian National Congress
13	Bombay South Central	Dr. Datta Samant	Independent
14	Buldhana (SC)	Mukul Balkrishna Wasnik	Indian National Congress
15	Chandrapur	Shantaram Potdukhe	Indian National Congress
16	Chimur	Vilas Bhaurao Muttemwar	Indian National Congress
17	Dahanu (ST)	Damodar Barku Shingada	Indian National Congress
18	Dhule (ST)	Reshma Motiram Bhoye	Indian National Congress
19	Erandol	Vijay Kumar Naval Patil	Indian National Congress
20	Hingoli	Uttam B. Rathod	Indian National Congress
21	Ichalkaranji	Rajaram Alias Balasaheb Shankarrao Mane	Indian National Congress
22	Jalgaon	Yadav Shivram Mahajan	Indian National Congress
23	Jalna	Balasaheb Pawar	Indian National Congress
24	Karad	Premalabai Dajisaheb Chavan	Indian National Congress
25	Khed	Ramkrishna More	Indian National Congress
26	Kolhapur	Udaysingrao Gaikwad	Indian National Congress
27	Kopargaon	Balasaheb Vikhe Patil	Indian National Congress
28	Kulaba	Dinkar Babu Patil	Peasants and Workers Party of India
29	Latur (SC)	Shivraj V. Patil	Indian National Congress
30	Malegaon (ST)	Sitaram Sayaji Bhoye	Indian National Congress
31	Nagpur	Banwari Lal Purohit	Indian National Congress
32	Nanded	Shankarrao Bhaurao Chavan	Indian National Congress
32	Nanded	Ashok Chavan (1987 Bypoll)	Indian National Congress
33	Nandurbar (ST)	Manikrao Hodlya Gavit	Indian National Congress
34	Nashik	Murlidhar Mane	Indian National Congress
35	Osmanabad (SC)	Arvind Tulsiram Kamble	Indian National Congress
36	Pandharpur (SC)	Sandipan Bhagwan Thorat	Indian National Congress
37	Parbhani	Ramrao Narayanrao Yadav	Indian National Congress
38	Pune	Vithal Narhar Gadgil	Indian National Congress
39	Rajapur	Prof. Madhu Dandavate	Janata Party
40	Ramtek	P. V. Narasimha Rao	Indian National Congress
41	Ratnagiri	Hussain Dalwai	Indian National Congress
42	Sangli	Prakash V. Patil	Indian National Congress
43	Satara	Prataprao Baburao Bhosale	Indian National Congress
44	Solapur	Gangadhar Sidramappa Kuchan	Indian National Congress
45	Thane	Shantaram Gopal Gholap	Indian National Congress
46	Wardha	Vasant Purushottam Sathe	Indian National Congress
47	Washim	Ghulam Nabi Azad	Indian National Congress
48	Yavatmal	Uttamrao Deorao Patil	Indian National Congress

== Manipur ==
INC (2)

No.	Constituency	Member of Parliament	Party affiliation
1	Inner Manipur	Prof. N. Tombi Singh	Indian National Congress
2	Outer Manipur (ST)	Prof. Meijinlung Kamson	Indian National Congress

== Meghalaya ==
INC (1) IND (1)

No.	Constituency	Member of Parliament	Party affiliation
1	Shillong	G. G. Swell	Independent
2	Tura (ST)	P. A. Sangma	Indian National Congress

== Mizoram ==
INC (1)

No.	Constituency	Member of Parliament	Party affiliation
1	Mizoram (ST)	Lalduhoma	Indian National Congress

== Nagaland ==
INC (1)

No.	Constituency	Member of Parliament	Party affiliation
!	Nagaland	Chingwang Konyak	Indian National Congress

== Orissa ==
INC (20) JP (1)

No.	Constituency	Member of Parliament	Party affiliation
1	Aska	Somnath Rath	Indian National Congress
2	Balasore	Chintamani Jena	Indian National Congress
3	Berhampur	Rachakonda Jagannath Rao	Indian National Congress
4	Bhadrak (SC)	Ananta Prasad Sethi	Indian National Congress
5	Bhubaneswar	Chintamani Panigrahi	Indian National Congress
6	Bolangir	Nityananda Misra	Indian National Congress
7	Cuttack	Jayanti Patnaik	Indian National Congress
8	Deogarh	Sriballava Panigrahi	Indian National Congress
9	Dhenkanal	Kamakhya Prasad Singh Deo	Indian National Congress
10	Jagatsinghpur	Lakshman Mallick	Indian National Congress
11	Jajpur (SC)	Anadi Charan Das	Indian National Congress
12	Kalahandi	Jagnath Patnaik	Indian National Congress
13	Kendrapara	Biju Patnaik	Janata Party
13	Kendrapara	Sarat Kumar Deb (1985 Bypoll)	Janata Party
14	Keonjhar (ST)	Harihar Soren	Indian National Congress
15	Koraput (ST)	Giridhar Gamang	Indian National Congress
16	Mayurbhanj (ST)	Sidha Lal Murmu	Indian National Congress
17	Nowrangpur (ST)	Khagapati Pradhani	Indian National Congress
18	Phulbani (SC)	Radhakanta Digal	Indian National Congress
19	Puri	Brajmohan Mohanty	Indian National Congress
20	Sambalpur	Dr. Krupasindhu Bhoi	Indian National Congress
21	Sundergarh (ST)	Maurice Kujur	Indian National Congress

== Puducherry ==
INC (1)

No.	Constituency	Member of Parliament	Party affiliation
1	Pondicherry	P. Shanmugam	Indian National Congress

== Punjab ==
SAD (7) INC (5)

No.	Constituency	Member of Parliament	Party affiliation
1	Amritsar	Raghunandan Lal Bhatia	Indian National Congress
2	Bhatinda (SC)	Teja Singh Dardi	Shiromani Akali Dal
3	Faridkot	Shaminder Singh	Shiromani Akali Dal
4	Ferozepur	Dr. Gurdial Singh Dhillon	Indian National Congress
5	Gurdaspur	Sukhbuns Kaur	Indian National Congress
6	Hoshiarpur	Sqn. Ldr. (Retd.) Kamal Chaudhry	Indian National Congress
7	Jullundur	General Rajindar Singh Sparrow	Indian National Congress
8	Ludhiana	Mewa Singh Gill	Shiromani Akali Dal
9	Patiala	Charanjit Singh Walia	Shiromani Akali Dal
10	Phillaur (SC)	Chaudhary Sunder Singh	Indian National Congress
11	Ropar (SC)	Charanjit Singh	Shiromani Akali Dal
12	Sangrur	Balwant Singh Ramoowalia	Shiromani Akali Dal
13	Tarn Taran	Tarlochan Singh Tur	Shiromani Akali Dal

== Rajasthan ==
INC (25)

No.	Constituency	Member of Parliament	Party affiliation
1	Ajmer	Vishnu Kumar Modi	Indian National Congress
2	Alwar	Ram Singh Yadav	Indian National Congress
3	Banswara (ST)	Prabhu Lal Rawat	Indian National Congress
4	Barmer	Virdhi Chand Jain	Indian National Congress
5	Bayana (SC)	Lala Ram Ken	Indian National Congress
6	Bharatpur	K. Natwar Singh	Indian National Congress
7	Bhilwara	Girdhari Lal Vyas	Indian National Congress
8	Bikaner	Manphool Singh Bhadu Chaudhary	Indian National Congress
9	Chittorgarh	Prof. Nirmla Kumari Shaktawat	Indian National Congress
10	Churu	Mohar Singh Rathore	Indian National Congress
10	Churu	Narendra Budania (1985 Bypoll)	Indian National Congress
11	Dausa	Rajesh Pilot	Indian National Congress
12	Ganganagar (SC)	Birbal Ram	Indian National Congress
13	Jaipur	Nawal Kishore Sharma	Indian National Congress
14	Jalore (SC)	Sardar Buta Singh	Indian National Congress
15	Jhalawar	Jujhar Singh	Indian National Congress
16	Jhunjhunu	Mohd. Ayub Khan	Indian National Congress
17	Jodhpur	Ashok Gehlot	Indian National Congress
18	Kota	Shanti Kumar Dhariwal	Indian National Congress
19	Nagaur	Ram Niwas Mirdha	Indian National Congress
20	Pali	Mool Chand Daga	Indian National Congress
20	Pali	Shankar Lal (1988 Bypoll)	Indian National Congress
21	Salumber (ST)	Alkha Ram	Indian National Congress
22	Sawai Madhopur (ST)	Ram Kumar Meena	Indian National Congress
23	Sikar	Dr. Balram Jakhar	Indian National Congress
24	Tonk (SC)	Banwari Lal Bairwa	Indian National Congress
25	Udaipur	Indubala Sukhadia	Indian National Congress

== Sikkim ==
SSP (1)

No.	Constituency	Member of Parliament	Party affiliation
1	Sikkim	Nar Bahadur Bhandari	Independent
1	Sikkim	Dil Kumari Bhandari (1985 Bypoll)	Sikkim Sangram Parishad

== Tamil Nadu ==
INC (25) AIADMK (12) DMK (2)

No.	Constituency	Member of Parliament	Party affiliation
1	Arakkonam	Jeevarathinam Rangaswamy	Indian National Congress
2	Chengalpattu	S. Jagathrakshakan	All India Anna Dravida Munnetra Kazhagam
3	Chidambaram (SC)	Dr. P. Vallal Peruman	Indian National Congress
4	Coimbatore	C. K. Kuppuswamy	Indian National Congress
5	Cuddalore	P. R. S. Venkatesan	Indian National Congress
6	Dharmapuri	M. Thambidurai	All India Anna Dravida Munnetra Kazhagam
7	Dindigul	K. R. Natarajan	All India Anna Dravida Munnetra Kazhagam
8	Gobichettipalayam	P. Kolandaivelu	All India Anna Dravida Munnetra Kazhagam
9	Karur	A. R. Murugaiah	Indian National Congress
10	Krishnagiri	Vazhappady K. Ramamurthy	Indian National Congress
11	Madras Central	Dr. A. Kalanithi	Dravida Munnetra Kazhagam
12	Madras North	N. V. N. Somu	Dravida Munnetra Kazhagam
13	Madras South	Dr. Vyjayantimala Bali	Indian National Congress
14	Madurai	A. G. Subburaman	Indian National Congress
15	Mayiladuthurai	E. S. M. Packeer Mohamed	Indian National Congress
16	Nagapattinam (SC)	M. Mahalingam	All India Anna Dravida Munnetra Kazhagam
17	Nagercoil	N. Dennis	Indian National Congress
18	Nilgiris (SC)	R. Prabhu	Indian National Congress
19	Palani	A. Senapathi Gounder	Indian National Congress
20	Perambalur (SC)	S. Thangaraju	All India Anna Dravida Munnetra Kazhagam
21	Periyakulam	P. Selvendran	All India Anna Dravida Munnetra Kazhagam
22	Pollachi (SC)	R. Anna Nambi	All India Anna Dravida Munnetra Kazhagam
23	Pudukkottai	N. Sundarraj	Indian National Congress
24	Ramanathapuram	Dr. Vadivelu Rajeshwaran	Indian National Congress
25	Rasipuram (SC)	B. Devarajan	Indian National Congress
26	Salem	P. R. Kumaramangalam	Indian National Congress
27	Sivaganga	Palaniappan Chidambaram	Indian National Congress
28	Sivakasi	N. Soundararajan	All India Anna Dravida Munnetra Kazhagam
29	Sriperumbudur (SC)	Maragatham Chandrasekar	Indian National Congress
30	Tenkasi (SC)	Mookaiah Arunachalam	Indian National Congress
31	Thanjavur	Sivanandam Singaravadivel	Indian National Congress
32	Tindivanam	S. S. Ramasami Padayatchiyar	Indian National Congress
33	Tiruchendur	K. T. Kosalram	Indian National Congress
33	Tiruchendur	R. Dhanuskodi Athithan (1985 Bypoll)	Indian National Congress
34	Tiruchengode	P. Kannan	All India Anna Dravida Munnetra Kazhagam
35	Tiruchirappalli	Lourdusamy Adaikalaraj	Indian National Congress
36	Tirunelveli	M. R. Kadambur Janarthanan	All India Anna Dravida Munnetra Kazhagam
37	Tirupattur	Adikesavan Jayamohan	Indian National Congress
38	Vandavasi	L. Balaraman	Indian National Congress
39	Vellore	A. C. Shanmugam	All India Anna Dravida Munnetra Kazhagam

== Tripura ==
CPI(M) (2)

No.	Constituency	Member of Parliament	Party affiliation
1	Tripura East (ST)	Baju Ban Riyan	Communist Party of India (Marxist)
2	Tripura West	Ajoy Biswas	Communist Party of India (Marxist)

== Uttar Pradesh ==
INC (83) LKD (2)

No.	Constituency	Member of Parliament	Party affiliation
1	Agra	Nihal Singh	Indian National Congress
2	Akbarpur (SC)	Rampiyare Suman	Indian National Congress
3	Aligarh	Usha Rani Tomar	Indian National Congress
4	Allahabad	Amitabh Bachchan	Indian National Congress
4	Allahabad	Vishwanath Pratap Singh (1988 Bypoll)	Jan Morcha
5	Almora	Harish Chandra Singh	Indian National Congress
6	Amethi	Rajiv Gandhi	Indian National Congress
7	Amroha	Ram Pal Singh	Indian National Congress
8	Aonla	Kalyan Singh Solanki	Indian National Congress
9	Azamgarh	Santosh Kumar Singh	Indian National Congress
10	Baghpat	Chaudhari Charan Singh	Lok Dal
11	Bahraich	Arif Mohammed Khan	Indian National Congress
12	Balarampur	Mahant Deep Narain Van	Indian National Congress
13	Ballia	Jagannath Chowdhary	Indian National Congress
14	Banda	Bhishma Deo Dube	Indian National Congress
15	Bansgaon (SC)	Mahabir Prasad	Indian National Congress
16	Barabanki (SC)	Kamla Prasad Rawat	Indian National Congress
17	Bareilly	Begam Abida Ahmed	Indian National Congress
18	Basti (SC)	Ram Awadh Prasad	Indian National Congress
19	Bijnor (SC)	Chowdhry Girdhari Lal	Indian National Congress
19	Bijnor (SC)	Meira Kumar (1985 Bypoll)	Indian National Congress
20	Bilhaur	Jagdish Awasthi	Indian National Congress
21	Budaun	Saleem Iqbal Shervani	Indian National Congress
22	Bulandshahar	Surendra Pal Singh	Indian National Congress
23	Chail (SC)	Dr. Bihari Lal Shailesh	Indian National Congress
24	Chandauli	Chandra Tripathi	Indian National Congress
25	Deoria	Raj Mangal Pande	Indian National Congress
26	Domariaganj	Kazi Jalil Abbasi	Indian National Congress
27	Etah	Mohammad Mahfooz Ali Khan	Lok Dal
28	Etawah	Raghuraj Singh Chaudhary	Indian National Congress
29	Faizabad	Dr. Nirmal Khatri	Indian National Congress
30	Farrukhabad	Khurshed Alam Khan	Indian National Congress
31	Fatehpur	Hari Krishna Shastri	Indian National Congress
32	Firozabad (SC)	Ganga Ram	Indian National Congress
33	Garhwal	Chandra Mohan Singh Negi	Indian National Congress
34	Ghatampur (SC)	Ashkaran Sankhwar	Indian National Congress
35	Ghazipur	Zainul Basher	Indian National Congress
36	Ghosi	Raj Kumar Rai	Indian National Congress
37	Gonda	Anand Singh	Indian National Congress
38	Gorakhpur	Madan Pandey	Indian National Congress
39	Hamirpur	Swami Prasad Singh	Indian National Congress
40	Hapur	Kedar Nath Singh	Indian National Congress
41	Hardoi (SC)	Kinder Lal	Indian National Congress
42	Hardwar (SC)	Sunder Lal	Indian National Congress
42	Hardwar (SC)	Ram Singh (1987 Bypoll)	Indian National Congress
43	Hathras (SC)	Puran Chandra	Indian National Congress
44	Jalaun (SC)	Chaudhary Lachchi Ram	Indian National Congress
45	Jalesar	Kailash Yadav	Indian National Congress
46	Jaunpur	Kamla Prasad Singh	Indian National Congress
47	Jhansi	Sujan Singh Bundela	Indian National Congress
48	Kairana	Akhtar Hasan	Indian National Congress
49	Kaiserganj	Rana Vir Singh	Indian National Congress
50	Kannauj	Sheila Dikshit	Indian National Congress
51	Kanpur	Naresh Chander Chaturvedi	Indian National Congress
52	Khalilabad	Dr. Chandra Shekar Tripathi	Indian National Congress
53	Kheri	Usha Verma	Indian National Congress
54	Khurja (SC)	Vir Sen	Indian National Congress
55	Lalganj (SC)	Sheila Kaul	Indian National Congress
56	Lucknow	Ram Dhan	Indian National Congress
57	Machhlishahr	Mishrapati	Indian National Congress
58	Maharajganj	Jitender Singh	Indian National Congress
59	Mainpuri	Balram Singh Yadav	Indian National Congress
60	Mathura	Manvendra Singh	Indian National Congress
61	Meerut	Mohsina Kidwai	Indian National Congress
62	Mirzapur	Umakant Mishra	Indian National Congress
63	Misrikh (SC)	Dr. Sankta Prasad	Indian National Congress
64	Mohanlalganj (SC)	Jagannath Prasad	Indian National Congress
65	Moradabad	Hafiz Mohd. Siddiq	Indian National Congress
66	Muzaffarnagar	Dharamvir Singh Tyagi	Indian National Congress
67	Nainital	Satyendra Chandra Guria	Indian National Congress
68	Padrauna	Kunwar Chandra Pratap Narain Singh	Indian National Congress
69	Phulpur	Ram Pujan Patel	Indian National Congress
70	Pilibhit	Bhanu Pratap Singh	Indian National Congress
71	Pratapgarh	Dinesh Singh	Indian National Congress
72	Raebareli	Arun Kumar Nehru	Indian National Congress
73	Rampur	Zulfiquar Ali Khan	Indian National Congress
74	Robertsganj (SC)	Ram Pyare Panika	Indian National Congress
75	Saharanpur	Yashpal Singh	Indian National Congress
76	Saidpur (SC)	Ram Samujhavan	Indian National Congress
77	Salempur	Ram Nagina Mishra	Indian National Congress
78	Sambhal	Smt. Shanti Devi	Indian National Congress
79	Shahabad	Dharam Gaj Singh	Indian National Congress
80	Shahjahanpur (SC)	Jitendra Prasada	Indian National Congress
81	Sitapur	Dr. Rajendra Kumari Bajpai	Indian National Congress
82	Sultanpur	Raj Karan Singh	Indian National Congress
83	Tehri Garhwal	Brahm Dutt	Indian National Congress
84	Unnao	Ziaur Rahman Ansari	Indian National Congress
85	Varanasi	Shyamlal Yadav	Indian National Congress

== West Bengal ==
CPI(M) (18) INC (16) CPI (3) RSP (3) FBL (2)

No.	Constituency	Member of Parliament	Party affiliation
1	Alipurduars (ST)	Pius Tirkey	Revolutionary Socialist Party
2	Arambagh (SC)	Anil Basu	Communist Party of India (Marxist)
3	Asansol	Ananda Gopal Mukhopadhyay	Indian National Congress
4	Balurghat (SC)	Palas Barman	Revolutionary Socialist Party
5	Bankura	Basudeb Acharia	Communist Party of India (Marxist)
6	Barasat	Tarun Kanti Ghosh	Indian National Congress
7	Barrackpore	Debi Ghosal	Indian National Congress
8	Basirhat	Indrajit Gupta	Communist Party of India
9	Berhampore	Atish Chandra Sinha	Indian National Congress
10	Birbhum (SC)	Gadadhar Saha	Communist Party of India (Marxist)
11	Bolpur	Dr. Saradish Roy	Communist Party of India (Marxist)
12	Burdwan	Dr. Sudhir Ray	Communist Party of India (Marxist)
13	Calcutta North East	Ajit Kumar Panja	Indian National Congress
14	Calcutta North West	Ashok Kumar Sen	Indian National Congress
15	Calcutta South	Bhola Nath Sen	Indian National Congress
16	Contai	Phulrenu Guha	Indian National Congress
17	Cooch Behar (SC)	Amar Roy Pradhan	All India Forward Bloc
18	Darjeeling	Ananda Pathak	Communist Party of India (Marxist)
19	Diamond Harbour	Amal Datta	Communist Party of India (Marxist)
20	Dum Dum	Asutosh Law	Indian National Congress
21	Durgapur (SC)	Purna Chandra Malik	Communist Party of India (Marxist)
22	Hooghly	Indumati Bhattacharya	Indian National Congress
23	Howrah	Priya Ranjan Dasmunsi	Indian National Congress
24	Jadavpur	Mamata Banerjee	Indian National Congress
25	Jalpaiguri	Manik Sanyal	Communist Party of India (Marxist)
26	Jangipur	Zainal Abedin	Communist Party of India (Marxist)
27	Jaynagar (SC)	Sanat Kumar Mandal	Revolutionary Socialist Party
28	Jhargram (ST)	Matilal Hansda	Communist Party of India (Marxist)
29	Katwa	Saifuddin Choudhury	Communist Party of India (Marxist)
30	Krishnagar	Renu Pada Das	Communist Party of India (Marxist)
31	Malda	A. B. A. Ghani Khan Choudhury	Indian National Congress
32	Mathurapur (SC)	Prof. Manoranjan Halder	Indian National Congress
33	Midnapore	Narayan Choubey	Communist Party of India
34	Murshidabad	Syed Masudal Hossain	Communist Party of India (Marxist)
35	Nabadwip (SC)	Bibha Ghosh Goswami	Communist Party of India (Marxist)
36	Panskura	Geeta Mukherjee	Communist Party of India
37	Purulia	Chittaranjan Mahata	All India Forward Bloc
38	Raiganj	Dr. Golam Yazdani	Indian National Congress
39	Serampore	Bimal Kanti Ghosh	Indian National Congress
40	Tamluk	Satyagopal Misra	Communist Party of India (Marxist)
41	Uluberia	Hannan Mollah	Communist Party of India (Marxist)
42	Vishnupur (SC)	Ajit Kumar Saha	Communist Party of India (Marxist)
