= P. Mohan (Sankarapuram politician) =

Indian politician

P. Mohan is an Indian politician and former member of the Tamil Nadu Legislative Assembly from the Sankarapuram constituency. He is Ex.Minister for Rural Industries (Rural Industries including Cottage Industries and Small Industries) of the Govt. of Tamil Nadu. He represents the Anna Dravida Munnetra Kazhagam party. He also served as Chinnasalem MLA from 2001 to 2006.

He is cousin brother of DMK MLA T. Udhayasuriyan.
