= Rasipuram Lok Sabha constituency =

Former constituency of the Indian parliament in Tamil Nadu

Coordinates: 11.47°N 78.17°E

Rasipuram
- Former Lok Sabha constituency

Constituency details
- Country: India
- Region: South India
- State: Tamil Nadu
- Established: 1977
- Abolished: 2008
- Total electors: 11,32,426
- Reservation: SC

Rasipuram was a Lok Sabha constituency in Tamil Nadu. After delimitation in 2009, it is now defunct. The area is now a part of the Namakkal (Lok Sabha constituency).

== Assembly segments ==
Rasipuram Lok Sabha constituency was composed of the following assembly segments:

1. Chinnasalem (defunct)
2. Attur (moved to Kallakurichi constituency after 2009)
3. Talavasal (SC) (defunct)
4. Rasipuram (moved to Namakkal constituency after 2009)
5. Sendamangalam (ST) (moved to Namakkal constituency after 2009)
6. Namakkal (SC) (moved to Namakkal constituency after 2009)

== Members of Parliament ==
Year	Name	Party
1977	B. Devarajan	Indian National Congress
1980	B. Devarajan	Indian National Congress
1984	B. Devarajan	Indian National Congress
1989	B. Devarajan	Indian National Congress
1991	B. Devarajan	Indian National Congress
1996	K. Kandasamy	Tamil Maanila Congress
1998	V. Saroja	All India Anna Dravida Munnetra Kazhagam
1999	V. Saroja	All India Anna Dravida Munnetra Kazhagam
2004	K. Rani	Indian National Congress

== Election results ==
Vote share of Winning candidates
2004	55.20%
1999	48.46%
1998	52.35%
1996	61.76%
1991	69.17%
1989	67.01%
1984	68.89%
1980	54.58%
1977	62.30%

=== General Elections 2004 ===
2004 Indian general election : Rasipuram
Party	Candidate	Votes	%	±%
INC	K. Rani	384,170	55.20%	
AIADMK	S. Anbalagan	2,49,637	35.87%	−12.60%
JD(U)	S. Ayyasamy	24,522	3.52%	
Independent	R. Ravi	12,286	1.77%	
BSP	M. P. Mariyappan	6,403	0.92%	
JP	N. Kumaravel	4,171	0.60%	
Independent	M. P. V. Ponmeny	3,956	0.57%	
Independent	K. Manivannan	3,577	0.51%	
Margin of victory		1,34,533	19.33%	13.22%
Turnout		6,95,976	61.46%	6.09%
Registered electors		11,32,426		−2.50%
INC gain from AIADMK		Swing	6.73%	

=== General Elections 1999 ===
1999 Indian general election : Rasipuram
Party	Candidate	Votes	%	±%
AIADMK	Dr. V. Saroja	304,843	48.46%	−3.89%
PMK	S. Uthayarasu	2,66,438	42.36%	
TMC(M)	Dr. C. Natesan	46,564	7.40%	
Independent	A. Madheshwaran	9,335	1.48%	
Margin of victory		38,405	6.11%	−3.30%
Turnout		6,29,001	55.37%	−10.92%
Registered electors		11,61,452		4.80%
AIADMK hold		Swing	-13.29%	

=== General Elections 1998 ===
1998 Indian general election : Rasipuram
Party	Candidate	Votes	%	±%
AIADMK	Dr. V. Saroja	302,801	52.35%	
TMC(M)	K. Kandasamy	2,48,424	42.95%	
INC	K. Thenmozhi	18,178	3.14%	−29.43%
PT	V. Arul Mani	5,338	0.92%	
Margin of victory		54,377	9.40%	−19.78%
Turnout		5,78,384	54.74%	−11.55%
Registered electors		11,08,272		5.78%
AIADMK gain from TMC(M)		Swing	-9.40%	

=== General Elections 1996 ===
1996 Indian general election : Rasipuram
Party	Candidate	Votes	%	±%
TMC(M)	K. Kandasamy	408,791	61.76%	
INC	K. Jayakumar	2,15,613	32.57%	−36.60%
MDMK	V. Chakravarthi	15,712	2.37%	
BJP	R. Dheenadayalan	5,109	0.77%	
RPI(A)	C. N. Kangani	3,654	0.55%	
Margin of victory		1,93,178	29.18%	−15.52%
Turnout		6,61,937	66.29%	2.87%
Registered electors		10,47,694		4.27%
TMC(M) gain from INC		Swing	-7.41%	

=== General Elections 1991 ===
1991 Indian general election : Rasipuram
Party	Candidate	Votes	%	±%
INC	B. Devarajan	422,400	69.17%	2.16%
DMK	I. Suhenya	1,49,415	24.47%	−2.50%
PMK	P. Jeyapal	23,097	3.78%	−0.82%
Independent	A. C. Sundararajan	4,625	0.76%	
Independent	A. Dharamrajan	4,421	0.72%	
Margin of victory		2,72,985	44.70%	4.66%
Turnout		6,10,679	63.42%	0.12%
Registered electors		10,04,810		−0.50%
INC hold		Swing	2.16%	

=== General Elections 1989 ===
1989 Indian general election : Rasipuram
Party	Candidate	Votes	%	±%
INC	B. Devarajan	421,674	67.01%	−1.88%
DMK	R. Mayavan	1,69,699	26.97%	−4.14%
PMK	P. Jayabal	28,971	4.60%	
Margin of victory		2,51,975	40.04%	2.27%
Turnout		6,29,248	63.30%	−8.48%
Registered electors		10,09,869		27.91%
INC hold		Swing	-1.88%	

=== General Elections 1984 ===
1984 Indian general election : Rasipuram
Party	Candidate	Votes	%	±%
INC	B. Devarajan	367,276	68.89%	
DMK	P. Duraisami	1,65,870	31.11%	
Margin of victory		2,01,406	37.78%	23.94%
Turnout		5,33,146	71.78%	11.70%
Registered electors		7,89,509		7.42%
INC gain from INC(I)		Swing	14.31%	

=== General Elections 1980 ===
1980 Indian general election : Rasipuram
Party	Candidate	Votes	%	±%
INC(I)	B. Devarajan	236,112	54.58%	
AIADMK	S. Anbalagan	1,76,240	40.74%	
Independent	M. Kamaraj	6,106	1.41%	
INC(U)	K. Kandaswamy	5,018	1.16%	
Independent	S. Kandaswamy	4,903	1.13%	
Independent	P. Rangasamy	2,589	0.60%	
Margin of victory		59,872	13.84%	−16.36%
Turnout		4,32,588	60.08%	−3.15%
Registered electors		7,34,978		2.59%
INC(I) gain from INC		Swing	-7.72%	

=== General Elections 1977 ===
1977 Indian general election : Rasipuram
Party	Candidate	Votes	%	±%
INC	B. Devarajan	275,212	62.30%	
INC(O)	Jothi Venkatachalam	1,41,774	32.09%	
Independent	M. Vajravel	24,793	5.61%	
Margin of victory		1,33,438	30.20%	
Turnout		4,41,779	63.24%	
Registered electors		7,16,448		
INC win (new seat)				

== See also ==
- Rasipuram
- List of constituencies of the Lok Sabha
