= Gangavalli Assembly constituency =

State Legislative Assembly Constituency in Tamil Nadu

Coordinates: 11°26′17″N 78°29′01″E

Gangavalli
- Constituency No. 81 for the Tamil Nadu Legislative Assembly

Constituency details
- Country: India
- Region: South India
- State: Tamil Nadu
- District: Salem
- Lok Sabha constituency: Kallakurichi
- Established: 2008
- Total electors: 2,18,375
- Reservation: SC

Member of Legislative Assembly
- 17th Tamil Nadu Legislative Assembly
- Incumbent A. Nallathambi
- Party: AIADMK
- Alliance: NDA
- Elected year: 2026

Gangavalli is a state assembly constituency in Tamil Nadu, India, that was formed after constituency delimitations in 2008. Its State Assembly Constituency number is 81. Located in Salem district, it comprises Gangavalli taluk and a portion of Attur taluk. It is a part of Kallakurichi Lok Sabha constituency for national elections to the Parliament of India. The seat is reserved for candidates from the Scheduled Castes. It is one of the 234 State Legislative Assembly Constituencies in Tamil Nadu in India.

A. Nallathambi is the MLA from ADMK party elected in 2021.

== Composition ==
Gangavalli is an assembly constituency in Salem district of Tamil Nadu, which includes Gangavalli Taluk and a part of Attur Taluk.Veeraganur, V.Ramanathapuram, Thammampatti, Sentharapatti, Naduvalur, Unathur, Veppanatham, Varagur, Siruvachur, Maniviluthan, Kattukkottai, Sadasivapuram, Sarvoy, Deviakkurichi, Talaivasal, Pattuthurai, Navakkurchi, Puthur, Nathakkarai, Periyeri, Aragalur, Thiyaganur, Arathi Agraharam, Mummudi, Kamakkapalayam, Vadakumarai, Thenkumarai, Sathapadi, Panavasal, Navalur, Puliyankurichi, Sitheri, Govindampalayam and Pallipalayam, Anayampatti, Anayampatti Puthur, Thedavoor, Odiyathur and other villages.

== Members of the Legislative Assembly ==
Year	Winner	Party
2011	R. Subha	Desiya Murpokku Dravida Kazhagam
2016	A. Maruthamuthu	All India Anna Dravida Munnetra Kazhagam
2021	A. Nallathambi	All India Anna Dravida Munnetra Kazhagam
2026	A. Nallathambi	All India Anna Dravida Munnetra Kazhagam

== Election results ==
Vote share of winning candidates
2026	37.20%
2021	47.89%
2016	42.22%
2011	48.60%

=== 2026 ===
2026 Tamil Nadu Legislative Assembly election: Gangavalli
Party	Candidate	Votes	%	±%
AIADMK	Nallathambi. A	73,167	37.20	▼10.69
DMK	Chinnadurai. K	58,763	29.88	▼14.08
TVK	Sujatha. V	55,291	28.11	New
NTK	Abirami. A	6,242	3.17	▼1.82
NOTA	NOTA	731	0.37	▼0.30
BSP	Balakrishnan. P	533	0.27	New
Independent	Dhanapal. S	444	0.23	New
Independent	Ramesh. S	390	0.20	New
TVK	Kaviarasan. T.T	234	0.12	New
PT	Marimuthu. S	220	0.11	New
Independent	Kannan. S	212	0.11	New
Independent	Tamilarasan. T	196	0.10	New
Anna Makkal Katchi	Anbazhagan. S	151	0.08	New
Independent	Gunaprakash. D	105	0.05	New
Margin of victory		14,404	7.32	▲3.38
Turnout		1,96,679	90.06	▲11.80
Registered electors		2,18,375		▼20,585
AIADMK hold		Swing	▼10.69	

=== 2021 ===
2021 Tamil Nadu Legislative Assembly election: Gangavalli
Party	Candidate	Votes	%	±%
AIADMK	A. Nallathambi	89,568	47.89%	+5.67
DMK	J. Rekha Priyadharshini	82,207	43.96%	+3.02
NTK	R. Vinothini	9,323	4.99%	+4.46
AMMK	A. Pandian	1,519	0.81%	New
NOTA	NOTA	1,251	0.67%	−0.33
Margin of victory		7,361	3.94%	2.65%
Turnout		187,011	78.26%	−2.15%
Rejected ballots		508	0.27%	
Registered electors		238,960		
AIADMK hold		Swing	5.67%	

=== 2016 ===
2016 Tamil Nadu Legislative Assembly election: Gangavalli
Party	Candidate	Votes	%	±%
AIADMK	A. Marutha Muthu	74,301	42.22%	New
DMK	J. Rekha Priyadharshini	72,039	40.94%	+1.31
PMK	A. Shanmugavel Murty	10,715	6.09%	New
DMDK	R. Subha	7,114	4.04%	−44.56
KMDK	A. Ganesan	3,786	2.15%	New
BJP	Dr. Sivagami Paramasivam	2,023	1.15%	−0.04
NOTA	NOTA	1,766	1.00%	New
NTK	P. Senthilkumar	921	0.52%	New
Margin of victory		2,262	1.29%	−7.69%
Turnout		175,981	80.41%	−1.46%
Registered electors		218,854		
AIADMK gain from DMDK		Swing	-6.38%	

=== 2011 ===
2011 Tamil Nadu Legislative Assembly election: Gangavalli
Party	Candidate	Votes	%	±%
DMDK	R. Subha	72,922	48.60%	New
DMK	K. Chinnadurai	59,457	39.63%	New
Independent	J. Manimaran	5,978	3.98%	New
IJK	P. Sivakami	4,048	2.70%	New
Independent	A. Murugesan	2,452	1.63%	New
BJP	G. Mathialagan	1,787	1.19%	New
LJP	S. Raja	1,520	1.01%	New
Margin of victory		13,465	8.97%	
Turnout		150,047	81.87%	
Registered electors		183,269		
DMDK win (new seat)				
