= R. M. Chinnathambi =

Member-Tamil Nadu Legislative Assembly
- In office 2016–2021
- Preceded by: S. Madheswaran
- Succeeded by: A. P. Jayasankaran
- Constituency: Attur

Personal details
- Born: 18 January 1961 Ramanayakkanpatti
- Party: All India Anna Dravida Munnetra Kazhagam
- Profession: Farmer

Ramanayakkanpalayam M. Chinnathambi is an Indian politician and a former Member of the Legislative Assembly (MLA) of Tamil Nadu. He hails from the village of Ramanayakkanpalayam in Attur Taluk, Salem District. Chinnathambi, who has studied up to Tenth Standard, belongs to the All India Anna Dravida Munnetra Kazhagam (AIADMK) party. He contested and won the Attur (Salem) Assembly Constituency in the 2016 Tamil Nadu Legislative Assembly election and became an MLA.Tamil Nadu Legislative Assembly

== Electoral Performance ==
=== 2016 ===
2016 Tamil Nadu Legislative Assembly election: Attur
Party	Candidate	Votes	%	±%
AIADMK	R. M. Chinnathambi	82,827	44.34%	−11.19
INC	S. K. Arthanari	65,493	35.06%	−1.64
PMK	G. Amsaveni	18,363	9.83%	New
VCK	K. P. Adhithyan	8,532	4.57%	New
NOTA	NOTA	2,742	1.47%	New
KMDK	R. Jayaseelan	2,413	1.29%	New
IJK	R. Selladurai	1,747	0.94%	New
NTK	S. Sathishbabu	1,531	0.82%	New
BSP	M. P. Mariyappan	947	0.51%	−0.35
Margin of victory		17,334	9.28%	−9.55%
Turnout		186,788	79.78%	−0.74%
Registered electors		234,136		
AIADMK hold		Swing	-11.19%	
