= R. Rakesh =

Indian politician

Member of the Tamil Nadu Legislative Assembly
- Incumbent
- Assumed office 11 May 2026
- Preceded by: T. Udhayasuriyan
- Constituency: Sankarapuram

Personal details
- Party: All India Anna Dravida Munnetra Kazhagam
- Parent: Rajavel (father)
- Occupation: Politician

R. Rakesh is an Indian politician who is a Member of the 17th Legislative Assembly of Tamil Nadu. He was elected from Sankarapuram as an AIADMK candidate in 2026.

== Elections contested ==
2026 Tamil Nadu Legislative Assembly election: Sankarapuram
Party	Candidate	Votes	%	±%
AIADMK	R. Rakesh	80,250	34.07	New
DMK	T. Udhayasuriyan	76,810	32.61	▼23.80
TVK	A. Jagadesan	67,624	28.71	New
NTK	K. Ramesh	5,567	2.36	▼2.24
NOTA	NOTA	383	0.16	
Margin of victory		3,440	1.46	▼19.93
Turnout		2,44,795	92.03	▲12.02
Registered electors		2,66,003		▼2,532
AIADMK gain from DMK		Swing	New	
