= Sankarapuram Assembly constituency =

State Legislative Assembly Constituency in Tamil Nadu

Coordinates: 11.89°N 78.91°E

Sankarapuram
- Constituency No. 79 for the Tamil Nadu Legislative Assembly

Constituency details
- Country: India
- Region: South India
- State: Tamil Nadu
- District: Kallakurichi
- Lok Sabha constituency: Kallakurichi
- Established: 1962
- Total electors: 2,66,003

Member of Legislative Assembly
- 17th Tamil Nadu Legislative Assembly
- Incumbent R. Rakesh
- Party: AIADMK
- Alliance: NDA
- Elected year: 2026

Sankarapuram is a state assembly constituency in Kallakurichi district of Tamil Nadu, India. Its State Assembly Constituency number is 79. It comprises portions of Sankarapuram, Chinnasalem and Kallakkurichi taluks. It is a part of Kallakurichi Lok Sabha constituency for national elections to the Parliament of India. It is one of the 234 State Legislative Assembly Constituencies in Tamil Nadu, in India. Elections and winners in the constituency are listed below.

== Demographics ==
Vanniyar, Sengunthar and Parayar were majority in this constituency. Telugu Naidu, Udayar, Chettiyar and other religious minorities constitute the secondary population.

== Members of Legislative Assembly ==
=== Madras State ===
Year	Winner	Party
1962	K. Parthasarathi	Indian National Congress
1967	S. P. Pachayappan	Dravida Munnetra Kazhagam

=== Tamil Nadu ===
Year	Winner	Party
1971	N. Natchiyappan	Dravida Munnetra Kazhagam
1977	Durai. Muthusamy	Indian National Congress
1980	S. Kalitheerthan	All India Anna Dravida Munnetra Kazhagam
1984	S. Kalitheerthan	All India Anna Dravida Munnetra Kazhagam
1989	M. Muthaiyan	Dravida Munnetra Kazhagam
1991	C. Ramaswamy	All India Anna Dravida Munnetra Kazhagam
1996	T. Udhayasuriyan	Dravida Munnetra Kazhagam
2001	P. Kasampu	Pattali Makkal Katchi
2006	A. Angayarkanni	Dravida Munnetra Kazhagam
2011	P. Mohan	All India Anna Dravida Munnetra Kazhagam
2016	T. Udhayasuriyan	Dravida Munnetra Kazhagam
2021	T. Udhayasuriyan	Dravida Munnetra Kazhagam
2026	R. Rakesh	All India Anna Dravida Munnetra Kazhagam

== Election results ==
Vote share of winning candidates
2026	34.07%
2021	56.41%
2016	44.72%
2011	51.24%
2006	43.47%
2001	45.12%
1996	53.68%
1991	68.06%
1989	33.08%
1984	59.49%
1980	49.91%
1977	31.45%
1971	50.06%
1967	54.75%
1962	52.71%

=== 2026 ===
2026 Tamil Nadu Legislative Assembly election: Sankarapuram
Party	Candidate	Votes	%	±%
AIADMK	R. Rakesh	80,250	34.07	New
DMK	T. Udhayasuriyan	76,810	32.61	▼23.80
TVK	A. Jagadesan	67,624	28.71	New
NTK	K. Ramesh	5,567	2.36	▼2.24
NOTA	NOTA	383	0.16	
Margin of victory		3,440	1.46	▼19.93
Turnout		2,44,795	92.03	▲12.02
Registered electors		2,66,003		▼2,532
AIADMK gain from DMK		Swing	New	

=== 2021 ===
2021 Tamil Nadu Legislative Assembly election: Sankarapuram
Party	Candidate	Votes	%	±%
DMK	T. Udhayasuriyan	121,186	56.41%	+11.68
PMK	Dr. G. Raja	75,223	35.01%	+28.32
NTK	B. Rajiyama	9,873	4.60%	New
Independent	P. Arul	2,120	0.99%	New
Independent	M. P. Mannan	1,156	0.54%	New
Margin of victory		45,963	21.39%	14.25%
Turnout		214,849	80.01%	−1.06%
Rejected ballots		84	0.04%	
Registered electors		268,535		
DMK hold		Swing	11.68%	

=== 2016 ===
2016 Tamil Nadu Legislative Assembly election: Sankarapuram
Party	Candidate	Votes	%	±%
DMK	T. Udhayasuriyan	90,920	44.72%	+0.63
AIADMK	P. Mohan	76,392	37.58%	−13.66
PMK	S. Sivaraman	13,612	6.70%	New
DMDK	R. Govinthan	13,343	6.56%	New
KMDK	S. Rajendran	1,189	0.58%	New
Independent	M. K. Moorthy	1,181	0.58%	New
SDPI	G. Abdul Gafoor	1,141	0.56%	New
NOTA	NOTA	1,032	0.51%	New
Margin of victory		14,528	7.15%	0.01%
Turnout		203,295	81.07%	−0.73%
Registered electors		250,770		
DMK gain from AIADMK		Swing	-6.51%	

=== 2011 ===
2011 Tamil Nadu Legislative Assembly election: Sankarapuram
Party	Candidate	Votes	%	±%
AIADMK	P. Mohan	87,522	51.24%	+9.46
DMK	T. Udhayasuriyan	75,324	44.09%	+0.62
Independent	S. Venkatesan	1,933	1.13%	New
BJP	K. Jayaverma	1,874	1.10%	New
BSP	P. Kumar	1,492	0.87%	−0.14
Margin of victory		12,198	7.14%	5.44%
Turnout		170,824	81.80%	11.53%
Registered electors		208,838		
AIADMK gain from DMK		Swing	7.76%	

=== 2006 ===
2006 Tamil Nadu Legislative Assembly election: Sankarapuram
Party	Candidate	Votes	%	±%
DMK	A. Angaiyarkanni	62,970	43.47%	−0.84
AIADMK	P. Sanniyasi	60,504	41.77%	New
DMDK	R. Chezhiyan	14,773	10.20%	New
Independent	C. Annammal	2,343	1.62%	New
BSP	C. Poobathi	1,473	1.02%	New
Independent	V. Aiyadurai	1,269	0.88%	New
SP	S. Ayyakkannu	804	0.56%	New
Margin of victory		2,466	1.70%	0.90%
Turnout		144,844	70.27%	6.01%
Registered electors		206,139		
DMK gain from PMK		Swing	-1.64%	

=== 2001 ===
2001 Tamil Nadu Legislative Assembly election: Sankarapuram
Party	Candidate	Votes	%	±%
PMK	P. Kasampu	56,971	45.12%	New
DMK	T. Udhayasuriyan	55,953	44.31%	−9.37
MDMK	K. Natarajan	4,842	3.83%	New
Independent	N. Jayakumar	4,026	3.19%	New
Independent	C. Mahadevan	1,673	1.32%	New
Independent	C. Poobathi	1,154	0.91%	New
Independent	E. Sarwarkhan	774	0.61%	New
Margin of victory		1,018	0.81%	−18.17%
Turnout		126,271	64.26%	−4.71%
Registered electors		196,533		
PMK gain from DMK		Swing	-8.56%	

=== 1996 ===
1996 Tamil Nadu Legislative Assembly election: Sankarapuram
Party	Candidate	Votes	%	±%
DMK	T. Udhayasuriyan	62,673	53.68%	+28.42
AIADMK	A. Saruvar Kasim	40,515	34.70%	−33.36
CPI(M)	M. Chinnappa	7,101	6.08%	New
AIIC(T)	A. Ramasamy	5,176	4.43%	New
Margin of victory		22,158	18.98%	−23.82%
Turnout		116,754	68.97%	1.08%
Registered electors		179,277		
DMK gain from AIADMK		Swing	-14.38%	

=== 1991 ===
1991 Tamil Nadu Legislative Assembly election: Sankarapuram
Party	Candidate	Votes	%	±%
AIADMK	C. Ramaswamy	71,688	68.06%	+44.33
DMK	S. Arunachalam	26,610	25.26%	−7.82
PMK	A. Sampath	3,102	2.95%	New
Independent	T. A. Kalia Perumal	2,036	1.93%	New
BJP	K. Meyyanathan	804	0.76%	New
Independent	T. Karunanithi	634	0.60%	New
Margin of victory		45,078	42.80%	33.45%
Turnout		105,329	67.89%	−8.67%
Registered electors		164,280		
AIADMK gain from DMK		Swing	34.98%	

=== 1989 ===
1989 Tamil Nadu Legislative Assembly election: Sankarapuram
Party	Candidate	Votes	%	±%
DMK	M. Muthaiyan	35,438	33.08%	+0.48
AIADMK	S. Kalitheerthan	25,421	23.73%	−35.76
INC	Sarojini Muthusami	25,365	23.68%	New
AIADMK	A. Saravar Kasim	18,840	17.59%	−41.9
Independent	G. Chandiran	1,462	1.36%	New
Independent	T. Abdul Wahab	603	0.56%	New
Margin of victory		10,017	9.35%	−17.54%
Turnout		107,129	76.56%	−1.39%
Registered electors		144,101		
DMK gain from AIADMK		Swing	-26.41%	

=== 1984 ===
1984 Tamil Nadu Legislative Assembly election: Sankarapuram
Party	Candidate	Votes	%	±%
AIADMK	S. Kalitheerthan	53,162	59.49%	+9.58
DMK	K. Venkatapathy	29,131	32.60%	New
Independent	T. A. Kalia Perumal	6,577	7.36%	New
Independent	I. Abdul Wahab	492	0.55%	New
Margin of victory		24,031	26.89%	22.03%
Turnout		89,362	77.94%	12.52%
Registered electors		122,305		
AIADMK hold		Swing	9.58%	

=== 1980 ===
1980 Tamil Nadu Legislative Assembly election: Sankarapuram
Party	Candidate	Votes	%	±%
AIADMK	S. Kalitheerthan	36,352	49.91%	+22.41
INC	Durai Muthusamy	32,811	45.05%	+13.6
Independent	N. Dharmalingam	3,049	4.19%	New
Independent	T. Abdul Wahab	619	0.85%	New
Margin of victory		3,541	4.86%	0.92%
Turnout		72,831	65.42%	−0.19%
Registered electors		113,528		
AIADMK gain from INC		Swing	18.47%	

=== 1977 ===
1977 Tamil Nadu Legislative Assembly election: Sankarapuram
Party	Candidate	Votes	%	±%
INC	Durai Muthusamy	21,593	31.45%	−18.49
AIADMK	M. Mohammed Haneef	18,885	27.50%	New
DMK	M. Muthaiyan	16,650	24.25%	−25.81
JP	A. Ramasamy	8,106	11.81%	New
Independent	R. Lakshman	3,430	5.00%	New
Margin of victory		2,708	3.94%	3.82%
Turnout		68,664	65.61%	−6.40%
Registered electors		106,711		
INC gain from DMK		Swing	-18.62%	

=== 1971 ===
1971 Tamil Nadu Legislative Assembly election: Sankarapuram
Party	Candidate	Votes	%	±%
DMK	N. Natchiyappan	28,544	50.06%	−4.68
INC	Durai Muthusamy	28,472	49.94%	+5.87
Margin of victory		72	0.13%	−10.55%
Turnout		57,016	72.01%	−2.48%
Registered electors		81,611		
DMK hold		Swing	-4.68%	

=== 1967 ===
1967 Madras Legislative Assembly election: Sankarapuram
Party	Candidate	Votes	%	±%
DMK	S. P. Pachaiyappan	28,292	54.75%	+7.45
INC	D. Muthusami	22,774	44.07%	−8.64
Independent	U. Younus	613	1.19%	New
Margin of victory		5,518	10.68%	5.27%
Turnout		51,679	74.49%	10.23%
Registered electors		72,198		
DMK gain from INC		Swing	2.04%	

=== 1962 ===
1962 Madras Legislative Assembly election: Sankarapuram
Party	Candidate	Votes	%	±%
INC	K. Parthasarathi	26,123	52.71%	New
DMK	S. P. Pachaiyappan	23,441	47.29%	New
Margin of victory		2,682	5.41%	
Turnout		49,564	64.26%	
Registered electors		80,504		
INC win (new seat)				
