= A. Nallathambi =

A. Nallathambi may refer to:

- A. Nallathambi (ADMK politician) from Gangavalli, Tamil Nadu
- A. Nallathambi (DMK politician) from Tirupattur, Tamil Nadu
