= R. Subha =

Indian politician

R. Subha is an Indian politician and incumbent Member of the Tamil Nadu Legislative Assembly from the Gangavalli constituency. She represents the Desiya Murpokku Dravidar Kazhagam party. She is from the Sarvaai Village, Tamil Nadu.
