= C. Palanimuthu =

Indian politician

C. Palanimuthu is an Indian politician and former Member of the Legislative Assembly of Tamil Nadu. He was elected to the Tamil Nadu legislative assembly as an Indian National Congress candidate from Attur constituency in 1977 and 1984 elections and as an Indian National Congress (Indira) in 1980 election.
