= A. M. Ramasamy =

Indian politician

A. M. Ramasamy is an Indian politician and former Member of the Legislative Assembly of Tamil Nadu. He was elected to the Tamil Nadu legislative assembly as a Dravida Munnetra Kazhagam candidate from Attur constituency in 1989 and 1996 elections. He was also an entrepreneur. He was born in a village near Rasipuram.
