= Attur Assembly constituency =

State Legislative Assembly Constituency in Tamil Nadu, India

Coordinates: 11.63°N 78.17°E

Attur
- Constituency No. 82 for the Tamil Nadu Legislative Assembly

Constituency details
- Country: India
- Region: South India
- State: Tamil Nadu
- District: Salem
- Lok Sabha constituency: Kallakurichi
- Established: 1951
- Total electors: 2,28,219
- Reservation: SC

Member of Legislative Assembly
- 17th Tamil Nadu Legislative Assembly
- Incumbent A. P. Jayasankaran
- Party: AIADMK
- Alliance: NDA
- Elected year: 2026

Attur is a state legislative assembly constituency in Salem district in the Indian state of Tamil Nadu. Its State Assembly Constituency number is 82. It comprises a portion of Attur taluk, which includes the city of Attur. The constituency is part of the wider Kallakurichi Lok Sabha constituency for national elections to the Parliament of India. The seat is reserved for candidates from the Scheduled Castes. It is one of the 234 State Legislative Assembly Constituencies in Tamil Nadu, in India.

== Members of the Legislative Assembly ==
Election	Member	Party
1952	M. P. Subramaniam	Independent politician
1957	Irusappan	Independent politician
1957	M. P. Subramaniam	Independent politician
1962	S. Angamuthu Naicker	Indian National Congress
1967	K. N. Sivaperumal	Dravida Munnetra Kazhagam
1971	V. Palanivel Gounder	Dravida Munnetra Kazhagam
1977	C. Palanimuthu	Indian National Congress
1980	C. Palanimuthu	Indian National Congress
1984	C. Palanimuthu	Indian National Congress
1989	A. M. Ramasamy	Dravida Munnetra Kazhagam
1991	V. Tamilarasu	All India Anna Dravida Munnetra Kazhagam
1996	A. M. Ramasamy	Dravida Munnetra Kazhagam
2001	A. K. Murugesan	All India Anna Dravida Munnetra Kazhagam
2006	M. R. Sundaram	Indian National Congress
2011	S. Madheswaran	All India Anna Dravida Munnetra Kazhagam
2016	R. M. Chinnathambi	All India Anna Dravida Munnetra Kazhagam
2021	A. P. Jayasankaran	All India Anna Dravida Munnetra Kazhagam
2026	A. P. Jayasankaran	All India Anna Dravida Munnetra Kazhagam

Madras State

== Election results ==
Vote share of winning candidates
2026	38.81%
2021	48.16%
2016	44.34%
2011	55.53%
2006	45.30%
2001	57.85%
1996	57.17%
1991	64.49%
1989	38.22%
1984	66.53%
1980	53.44%
1977	29.80%
1971	52.79%
1967	57.22%
1962	39.28%
1957	21.50%
1952	39.94%

=== Assembly election 2026 ===
2026 Tamil Nadu Legislative Assembly election : Attur
Party	Candidate	Votes	%	±%
AIADMK	A. P. Jayasankaran	80,843	38.81%	New
TVK	Selvabharathi. R	65,525	31.46%	New
INC	S. K. Arthanari	51,896	24.91%	New
NTK	Monisha Chinnadurai.	6,532	3.14%	▼2.03
NOTA	None of the above	1,031	0.49%	▼0.44
Margin of victory		15,318	7.35%	▲3.18
Turnout		208,562	91.39%	▲12.84
Total valid votes		208,296		
Registered electors		228,219		▼10.40
AIADMK gain from AIADMK		Swing	▼9.35	

=== Assembly election 2021 ===
2021 Tamil Nadu Legislative Assembly election : Attur
Party	Candidate	Votes	%	±%
AIADMK	A. P. Jayasankaran	95,308	48.16%	▲3.82
DMK	K. Chinnadurai	87,051	43.99%	New
NTK	S. Krishnaveni	10,233	5.17%	▲4.35
MNM	P. Sivakumar	1,959	0.99%	New
NOTA	None of the above	1,834	0.93%	▼0.54
AMMK	S. Madheswaran	1,699	0.86%	New
Margin of victory		8,257	4.17%	▼5.11
Turnout		200,069	78.55%	▼1.29
Total valid votes		197,909		
Rejected ballots		326	0.16%	▲0.08
Registered electors		254,705		▲8.79
AIADMK hold		Swing		

=== Assembly election 2016 ===
2016 Tamil Nadu Legislative Assembly election : Attur
Party	Candidate	Votes	%	±%
AIADMK	R. M. Chinnathambi	82,827	44.34%	▼11.19
INC	S. K. Arthanari	65,493	35.06%	▼1.64
PMK	G. Amsaveni	18,363	9.83%	New
VCK	K. P. Adhithyan	8,532	4.57%	New
NOTA	None of the above	2,742	1.47%	New
KMDK	R. Jayaseelan	2,413	1.29%	New
IJK	R. Selladurai	1,747	0.94%	▼0.95
NTK	S. Sathishbabu	1,531	0.82%	New
Margin of victory		17,334	9.28%	▼9.55
Turnout		186,940	79.84%	▼1.09
Total valid votes		186,788		
Rejected ballots		152	0.08%	
Registered electors		234,136		▲18.91
AIADMK hold		Swing		

=== Assembly election 2011 ===
2011 Tamil Nadu Legislative Assembly election : Attur
Party	Candidate	Votes	%	±%
AIADMK	S. Madheswaran	88,036	55.53%	▲19.05
INC	S. K. Arthanari	58,180	36.70%	▼8.60
IJK	N. Arulkumar	2,993	1.89%	New
Independent	K. Palaniraja	2,348	1.48%	
BJP	K. Annadurai	1,690	1.07%	▼0.21
Independent	C. Rajamanickam	1,462	0.92%	
BSP	M. P. Mariappan	1,366	0.86%	▼0.09
Margin of victory		29,856	18.83%	▲10.02
Turnout		159,337	80.93%	▲7.26
Total valid votes		158,536		
Rejected ballots		126	0.08%	▲0.08
Registered electors		196,894		▲22.46
AIADMK gain from INC		Swing	▲10.23	

=== Assembly election 2006 ===
2006 Tamil Nadu Legislative Assembly election : Attur
Party	Candidate	Votes	%	±%
INC	M. R. Sundaram	53,617	45.30%	New
AIADMK	A. K. Murugesan	43,185	36.48%	New
DMDK	A. R. Elangovan	15,654	13.22%	New
BJP	A. Kumaravel	1,510	1.28%	New
Independent	N. Laxmanan	1,150	0.97%	
BSP	M. P. Mariappan	1,130	0.95%	New
Independent	K. Sundaram	854	0.72%	
Independent	S. Anto David	756	0.64%	
Margin of victory		10,432	8.81%	▼13.24
Turnout		118,449	73.67%	▲8.04
Total valid votes		118,370		
Registered electors		160,786		▼5.99
INC gain from AIADMK		Swing	▼12.55	

=== Assembly election 2001 ===
2001 Tamil Nadu Legislative Assembly election : Attur
Party	Candidate	Votes	%	±%
AIADMK	A. K. Murugesan	64,936	57.85%	▲22.16
DMK	Mu. Ra. Karunanidhi	40,191	35.81%	▼21.36
Independent	P. Ravikumar	1,893	1.69%	
MDMK	V. Gopalraj	1,407	1.25%	▲0.67
Independent	V. Angamuthu	1,290	1.15%	
Independent	K. Natarajan	1,033	0.92%	
Margin of victory		24,745	22.05%	▲0.58
Turnout		112,245	65.63%	▼2.51
Total valid votes		112,244		
Registered electors		171,024		▲8.01
AIADMK gain from DMK		Swing	▲0.68	

=== Assembly election 1996 ===
1996 Tamil Nadu Legislative Assembly election : Attur
Party	Candidate	Votes	%	±%
DMK	A. M. Ramasamy	59,353	57.17%	▲31.32
AIADMK	A. K. Murugesan	37,057	35.69%	New
AIIC(T)	P. M. Santhanantham	5,660	5.45%	New
Margin of victory		22,296	21.47%	▼17.17
Turnout		107,890	68.14%	▲3.30
Total valid votes		103,824		
Rejected ballots		4,422	4.10%	▲0.56
Registered electors		158,343		▲4.61
DMK gain from AIADMK		Swing	▼7.32	

=== Assembly election 1991 ===
1991 Tamil Nadu Legislative Assembly election : Attur
Party	Candidate	Votes	%	±%
AIADMK	V. Tamilarasu	61,060	64.49%	New
DMK	A. M. Ramasamy	24,475	25.85%	▼12.37
PMK	M. Palanivel	8,164	8.62%	New
Margin of victory		36,585	38.64%	▲32.02
Turnout		98,151	64.84%	▼1.79
Total valid votes		94,676		
Rejected ballots		3,475	3.54%	▲1.12
Registered electors		151,368		▲11.88
AIADMK gain from DMK		Swing	▲26.27	

=== Assembly election 1989 ===
1989 Tamil Nadu Legislative Assembly election : Attur
Party	Candidate	Votes	%	±%
DMK	A. M. Ramasamy	33,620	38.22%	▲8.71
AIADMK	M. P. Subramaniam	27,795	31.60%	New
INC	C. Palanimuthu	15,559	17.69%	▼48.84
Independent	K. V. Ramanathan	7,201	8.19%	
Independent	K. V. Murugesan	1,636	1.86%	
Independent	V. Ashokan	748	0.85%	
Margin of victory		5,825	6.62%	▼30.40
Turnout		90,152	66.63%	▼6.72
Total valid votes		87,971		
Rejected ballots		2,181	2.42%	▼1.79
Registered electors		135,294		▲13.09
DMK gain from INC		Swing	▼28.31	

=== Assembly election 1984 ===
1984 Tamil Nadu Legislative Assembly election : Attur
Party	Candidate	Votes	%	±%
INC	C. Palanimuthu	55,927	66.53%	▲13.09
DMK	A. M. Ramasamy	24,804	29.51%	New
Independent	P. M. Santhanantham	1,220	1.45%	
Independent	S. Nachappan	1,191	1.42%	
Independent	C. Sundara Rajan	626	0.74%	
Margin of victory		31,123	37.02%	▲27.43
Turnout		87,751	73.35%	▲8.91
Total valid votes		84,060		
Rejected ballots		3,691	4.21%	▲2.56
Registered electors		119,635		▲5.46
INC hold		Swing		

=== Assembly election 1980 ===
1980 Tamil Nadu Legislative Assembly election : Attur
Party	Candidate	Votes	%	±%
INC	C. Palanimuthu	38,416	53.44%	▲23.64
AIADMK	P. Kandasamy	31,525	43.85%	New
RPI	C. N. Kangani	1,945	2.71%	New
Margin of victory		6,891	9.59%	▲9.05
Turnout		73,095	64.44%	▲5.43
Total valid votes		71,886		
Rejected ballots		1,209	1.65%	▲0.06
Registered electors		113,439		▲3.10
INC hold		Swing		

=== Assembly election 1977 ===
1977 Tamil Nadu Legislative Assembly election : Attur
Party	Candidate	Votes	%	±%
INC	C. Palanimuthu	19,040	29.80%	New
AIADMK	P. Kandasamy	18,693	29.25%	New
JP	A. S. Chinnaswamy	16,860	26.39%	New
DMK	D. Perumal	9,306	14.56%	▼38.23
Margin of victory		347	0.54%	▼5.04
Turnout		64,930	59.01%	▼12.55
Total valid votes		63,899		
Rejected ballots		1,031	1.59%	▲1.59
Registered electors		110,029		▲1.63
INC gain from DMK		Swing	▼22.99	

=== Assembly election 1971 ===
1971 Tamil Nadu Legislative Assembly election : Attur
Party	Candidate	Votes	%	±%
DMK	V. Palanivel Gounder	39,828	52.79%	▼4.43
INC	C. Palanimuthu	35,617	47.21%	New
Margin of victory		4,211	5.58%	▼8.85
Turnout		77,475	71.56%	▼4.52
Total valid votes		75,445		
Registered electors		108,265		▲13.53
DMK hold		Swing		

=== Assembly election 1967 ===
1967 Madras State Legislative Assembly election : Attur
Party	Candidate	Votes	%	±%
DMK	K. N. Sivaperumal	40,456	57.22%	▲24.17
INC	M. P. Subramaniam	30,252	42.78%	▲3.50
Margin of victory		10,204	14.43%	▲8.21
Turnout		72,547	76.08%	▲6.36
Total valid votes		70,708		
Registered electors		95,362		▲7.65
DMK gain from INC		Swing	▲17.94	

=== Assembly election 1962 ===
1962 Madras State Legislative Assembly election : Attur
Party	Candidate	Votes	%	±%
INC	S. Angamuthu Naicker	23,542	39.28%	▲14.24
DMK	K. N. Sivaperumal	19,811	33.05%	New
TNP	M. P. Subramaniam	13,686	22.83%	New
SWA	R. Saravana Padayachi	1,888	3.15%	New
We Tamils	R. Rangaswamy	1,009	1.68%	New
Margin of victory		3,731	6.22%	▲0.64
Turnout		61,766	69.72%	▼23.63
Total valid votes		59,936		
Registered electors		88,586		▼42.61
INC gain from Independent		Swing	▲17.78	

=== Assembly election 1957 ===
1957 Madras State Legislative Assembly election : Attur
Party	Candidate	Votes	%	±%
Independent	Irusappan	30,984	21.50%	
Independent	M. P. Subramaniam	29,153	20.23%	
INC	A. Sambasiva Reddiar	22,937	15.92%	▼6.23
Independent	M. Arumugham	21,089	14.64%	
INC	A. Doraisamy	13,138	9.12%	▼13.03
CPI	C. Doraisamy	8,663	6.01%	New
CPI	T. Ramachandran	7,187	4.99%	New
Independent	K. R. Periannan	6,023	4.18%	
Independent	Akilandam	4,924	3.42%	
Margin of victory		8,047	5.58%	▼12.22
Turnout		144,098	93.35%	▲44.56
Total valid votes		144,098		
Registered electors		154,364		▲142.71
Independent hold		Swing		

=== Assembly election 1952 ===
1952 Madras State Legislative Assembly election : Attur
Party	Candidate	Votes	%	±%
Independent	M. P. Subramaniam	12,394	39.94%	New
INC	P. Sellamuthu Padayachi	6,872	22.15%	New
Independent	M. Muthuswamy Padayachi	4,044	13.03%	New
Independent	Ramachandra Bhatt	3,393	10.93%	New
Independent	V. Palanivel Gounder	2,184	7.04%	New
Socialist Party (India)	S. Kandaswami Padyachi	2,142	6.90%	New
Margin of victory		5,522	17.80%	
Turnout		31,029	48.79%	
Total valid votes		31,029		
Registered electors		63,599		
Independent win (new seat)				
