= S. Sivaraman =

Indian politician

S. Sivaraman is an Indian politician and former Member of the Legislative Assembly of Tamil Nadu. He was elected to the Tamil Nadu legislative assembly as an Indian National Congress (Indira) candidate from Chinnasalem constituency in 1980 election and as an Independent candidate in 1984 election.
