= M. R. Sundaram =

Indian politician

M. R. Sundaram was elected to the Tamil Nadu Legislative Assembly from the Attur constituency in the 2006 election. He was a candidate of the Indian National Congress (INC) party.
