= Moo. Marimuthu =

Indian politician

Member of the Tamil Nadu Legislative Assembly
- In office 1967 – 1972; 1971 – 1976
- Constituency: Talavasal

Personal details
- Political party: Dravida Munnetra Kazhagam

Moo. Marimuthu is an Indian politician and former Member of the Legislative Assembly of Tamil Nadu. He was elected to the Tamil Nadu legislative assembly as a Dravida Munnetra Kazhagam candidate from Talavasal constituency in the 1967 and 1971 elections.

== Electoral performance ==
1971 Tamil Nadu Legislative Assembly election: Talavasal
Party	Candidate	Votes	%	±%
DMK	Moo. Marimuthu	32,195	48.67%	−6.72%
INC	T. Er. Sappan	29,013	43.86%	3.18%
Independent	A. R. Palamuthu	4,289	6.48%	
Independent	A. Shanmugan	648	0.98%	
Margin of victory		3,182	4.81%	−9.90%
Turnout		66,145	66.16%	−3.82%
Registered electors		1,04,113		
DMK hold		Swing	-6.72%	

1967 Madras Legislative Assembly election: Talavasal
Party	Candidate	Votes	%	±%
DMK	Moo. Marimuthu	33,289	55.39%	18.85%
INC	A. Doraisamy	24,448	40.68%	−6.16%
Independent	K. Muthusamy	1,687	2.81%	
Independent	M. Vajjiravel	353	0.59%	
Independent	S. Arumugam	324	0.54%	
Margin of victory		8,841	14.71%	4.41%
Turnout		60,101	69.97%	6.99%
Registered electors		89,072		
DMK gain from INC		Swing	8.55%	
