= Talavasal Assembly constituency =

Former constituency in Tamil Nadu, India

Coordinates: 11.59°N 78.76°E

Talavasal
- Former constituency for the Tamil Nadu Legislative Assembly

Constituency details
- Country: India
- Region: South India
- State: Tamil Nadu
- District: Kallakurichi
- Lok Sabha constituency: Rasipuram
- Established: 1951
- Abolished: 2008
- Total electors: 182,114
- Reservation: None

Talavasal is a former state assembly constituency in Salem district in Tamil Nadu. It was a Scheduled Caste reserved constituency. Elections and winners in the constituency are listed below. An election was not held in the year 1957.

== Members of the Legislative Assembly ==
Year	Winner	Party
Madras State
1952	A. Sambasivam	Indian National Congress
1962	A. Doraisamy	Indian National Congress
1967	Moo. Marimuthu	Dravida Munnetra Kazhagam
Tamil Nadu
1971	Moo. Marimuthu	Dravida Munnetra Kazhagam
1977	S. M. Raju	All India Anna Dravida Munnetra Kazhagam
1980	T. Rajambal	Indian National Congress (I)
1984	T. Rajambal	Indian National Congress
1989	S. Gunasekaran	Dravida Munnetra Kazhagam
1991	K. Kandasamy	Indian National Congress
1996	K. Rani	Tamil Maanila Congress
2001	V. Alagammal	All India Anna Dravida Munnetra Kazhagam
2006	K. Chinnadurai	Dravida Munnetra Kazhagam

== Election results ==
Vote share of winning candidates
2006	45.69%
2001	58.24%
1996	57.71%
1991	73.74%
1989	33.93%
1984	64.73%
1980	52.40%
1977	36.33%
1971	48.67%
1967	55.39%
1962	46.84%
1952	39.54%

=== 2006 ===
2006 Tamil Nadu Legislative Assembly election: Talavasal
Party	Candidate	Votes	%	±%
DMK	K. Chinnadurai	60,287	45.69%	11.42%
AIADMK	P. Elangovan	50,238	38.08%	−20.17%
DMDK	K. Geetha	12,824	9.72%	
Independent	P. Rajkumar	2,096	1.59%	
Independent	M. Paramasivam	1,476	1.12%	
BJP	S. Saravanan	1,309	0.99%	
Independent	K. Muthaiyan	1,189	0.90%	
BSP	P. Manivannan	1,106	0.84%	
Independent	J. Rajamani	548	0.42%	
SP	K. Chellamuthu	451	0.34%	
Independent	J. Poongothai	419	0.32%	
Margin of victory		10,049	7.62%	−16.36%
Turnout		1,31,943	72.45%	11.72%
Registered electors		1,82,114		
DMK gain from AIADMK		Swing	-12.55%	

=== 2001 ===
2001 Tamil Nadu Legislative Assembly election: Talavasal
Party	Candidate	Votes	%	±%
AIADMK	V. Alagammal	67,682	58.24%	
DMK	M. Pandiyarajan	39,825	34.27%	
MDMK	M. Singaravel	3,176	2.73%	0.40%
Independent	P. Pandian	2,805	2.41%	
Independent	P. Sujatha	1,076	0.93%	
Independent	M. Kandasamy	915	0.79%	
Independent	A. P. N. Palaniappan	727	0.63%	
Margin of victory		27,857	23.97%	−1.06%
Turnout		1,16,206	60.73%	−3.28%
Registered electors		1,91,351		
AIADMK gain from TMC(M)		Swing	0.53%	

=== 1996 ===
1996 Tamil Nadu Legislative Assembly election: Talavasal
Party	Candidate	Votes	%	±%
TMC(M)	K. Rani	63,132	57.71%	
INC	K. Kaliaperumal	35,750	32.68%	−41.06%
PMK	R. Ravichandran	6,147	5.62%	
MDMK	M. Singaravel	2,550	2.33%	
Independent	N. Thangavel @ Thangam Ambedkar	532	0.49%	
Independent	K. Jayakumar	367	0.34%	
Independent	V. Veerababu	197	0.18%	
Independent	A. S. Maran	160	0.15%	
Independent	P. Vimaladevi	144	0.13%	
Independent	F. Amaladoss @ Kumaran	96	0.09%	
Independent	K. Vaiyapuri	90	0.08%	
Margin of victory		27,382	25.03%	−28.08%
Turnout		1,09,395	64.02%	2.50%
Registered electors		1,76,313		
TMC(M) gain from INC		Swing	-16.03%	

=== 1991 ===
1991 Tamil Nadu Legislative Assembly election: Talavasal
Party	Candidate	Votes	%	±%
INC	K. Kandasamy	74,204	73.74%	48.96%
DMK	S. Gunasekaran	20,757	20.63%	−13.30%
PMK	M. C. Rajendran	4,801	4.77%	
Independent	M. Kandasamy	474	0.47%	
RPI	G. Sankar	397	0.39%	
Margin of victory		53,447	53.11%	46.73%
Turnout		1,00,633	61.52%	−3.51%
Registered electors		1,69,151		
INC gain from DMK		Swing	39.81%	

=== 1989 ===
1989 Tamil Nadu Legislative Assembly election: Talavasal
Party	Candidate	Votes	%	±%
DMK	S. Gunasekaran	32,309	33.93%	3.10%
AIADMK	T. Rajambal	26,230	27.54%	
INC	K. Kandasamy	23,596	24.78%	−39.95%
AIADMK	P. Venkatachalam	10,855	11.40%	
Independent	P. Rajathi	685	0.72%	
Independent	M. Kandasamy	447	0.47%	
Independent	M. C. Rajendiran	351	0.37%	
Independent	K. Muthulingam	288	0.30%	
Independent	M. Sadeyan	206	0.22%	
Independent	Moo. Marimuthu	155	0.16%	
Independent	K. Maruthamuthu	107	0.11%	
Margin of victory		6,079	6.38%	−27.52%
Turnout		95,229	65.03%	−2.36%
Registered electors		1,50,564		
DMK gain from INC		Swing	-30.80%	

=== 1984 ===
1984 Tamil Nadu Legislative Assembly election: Talavasal
Party	Candidate	Votes	%	±%
INC	T. Rajambal	53,104	64.73%	12.33%
DMK	R. Ravichandar	25,291	30.83%	
Independent	M. Kandasamy	1,479	1.80%	
Independent	P. Kullandi	836	1.02%	
Independent	A. Raju	803	0.98%	
Independent	K. Kalia Perumal	278	0.34%	
Independent	C. Thangemuthu	246	0.30%	
Margin of victory		27,813	33.90%	29.11%
Turnout		82,037	67.39%	11.00%
Registered electors		1,28,351		
INC hold		Swing	12.33%	

=== 1980 ===
1980 Tamil Nadu Legislative Assembly election: Talavasal
Party	Candidate	Votes	%	±%
INC	T. Rajambal	38,217	52.40%	24.42%
AIADMK	M. Devarajan	34,718	47.60%	11.27%
Margin of victory		3,499	4.80%	−3.56%
Turnout		72,935	56.39%	4.51%
Registered electors		1,31,995		
INC gain from AIADMK		Swing	16.07%	

=== 1977 ===
1977 Tamil Nadu Legislative Assembly election: Talavasal
Party	Candidate	Votes	%	±%
AIADMK	S. M. Raju	24,681	36.33%	
INC	K. Kaliyaperumal	19,004	27.97%	−15.89%
DMK	K. R. Thangavelu	13,603	20.02%	−28.65%
JP	C. Veermani	10,645	15.67%	
Margin of victory		5,677	8.36%	3.55%
Turnout		67,933	51.88%	−14.27%
Registered electors		1,33,495		
AIADMK gain from DMK		Swing	-12.34%	

=== 1971 ===
1971 Tamil Nadu Legislative Assembly election: Talavasal
Party	Candidate	Votes	%	±%
DMK	Moo. Marimuthu	32,195	48.67%	−6.72%
INC	T. Er. Sappan	29,013	43.86%	3.18%
Independent	A. R. Palamuthu	4,289	6.48%	
Independent	A. Shanmugan	648	0.98%	
Margin of victory		3,182	4.81%	−9.90%
Turnout		66,145	66.16%	−3.82%
Registered electors		1,04,113		
DMK hold		Swing	-6.72%	

=== 1967 ===
1967 Madras Legislative Assembly election: Talavasal
Party	Candidate	Votes	%	±%
DMK	Moo. Marimuthu	33,289	55.39%	18.85%
INC	A. Doraisamy	24,448	40.68%	−6.16%
Independent	K. Muthusamy	1,687	2.81%	
Independent	M. Vajjiravel	353	0.59%	
Independent	S. Arumugam	324	0.54%	
Margin of victory		8,841	14.71%	4.41%
Turnout		60,101	69.97%	6.99%
Registered electors		89,072		
DMK gain from INC		Swing	8.55%	

=== 1962 ===
1962 Madras Legislative Assembly election: Talavasal
Party	Candidate	Votes	%	±%
INC	A. Doraiswamy	22,286	46.84%	
DMK	K. R. Thangavel	17,386	36.54%	
TNP	T. Irusappan	6,402	13.45%	
SWA	S. Arumugham	1,507	3.17%	
Margin of victory		4,900	10.30%	
Turnout		47,581	62.98%	
Registered electors		78,445		
INC hold		Swing		

=== 1952 ===
1952 Madras Legislative Assembly election: Talavasal
Party	Candidate	Votes	%	±%
INC	A. Sambasivam	14,738	39.54%	39.54%
Independent	M. Gopala Chetty	11,522	30.92%	
Independent	P. Ugravel	7,458	20.01%	
Independent	Periasamy Moopan	3,551	9.53%	
Margin of victory		3,216	8.63%	
Turnout		37,269	49.72%	
Registered electors		74,952		
INC win (new seat)				
