= K. Rani (politician) =

Indian politician

Member of Parliament
- Constituency: Rasipuram

Personal details
- Born: 19 May 1958 (age 68) Namakkal, Tamil Nadu
- Party: Indian National Congress
- Children: 1
- Education: M.A., B.Ed
- As of 22 September, 2007

K. Rani (born 19 May 1958) was a member of the 14th Lok Sabha of India. She represented the Rasipuram constituency in Tamil Nadu from 2004 to 2009, which was reserved for candidates from the Scheduled Castes. She also served as Member of Legislative Assembly from Talavasal assembly constituency between 1996 - 2001.

== Positions held ==
Rani was elected to the Tamil Nadu Legislative Assembly in the 1996 state elections as a candidate of the TMC. She had contested the Talavasal constituency, which was reserved for candidates from the Scheduled Castes. She served a full term in the Assembly, to 2001, and was a Member of the Committee on Empowerment of Women.

Rani was elected as an INC MP from the Rasipuram Lok Sabha constituency, which was also reserved for the Scheduled Castes, in the 14th Lok Sabha elections. She was also selected as a Member of the Committee on Health & Family Welfare from 5 Aug. 2007 onwards. From 16 August 2006 onwards she was a Member on the Committee on Empowerment of Women.

The INC nominated Rani to stand in the elections for the 15th Lok Sabha, this time from the seat of Villupuram. Her previous constituency of Rasipuram had ceased to exist due to boundary changes.
