= R. Mookappan =

Indian politician

R. Mookappan was elected to the Tamil Nadu Legislative Assembly from the Chinnasalem constituency in the 1996 elections. He was a candidate of the Dravida Munnetra Kazhagam (DMK) party.
