= S. Kalitheerthan =

Indian politician

S. Kalitheerthan (died January 2011) was an Indian politician and former Member of the Legislative Assembly of Tamil Nadu. He was elected to the Tamil Nadu legislative assembly from Sankarapuram constituency as an Anna Dravida Munnetra Kazhagam candidate in 1980 and 1984 elections. He died in January 2011 following illness.
