= A. P. Jayasankaran =

Indian politician

Member of the Tamil Nadu Legislative Assembly
- Incumbent
- Assumed office 12 May 2021
- Preceded by: R. M. Chinnathambi
- Constituency: Attur

Personal details
- Party: All India Anna Dravida Munnetra Kazhagam

A. P. Jayasankaran is an Indian politician who is a Member of Legislative Assembly of Tamil Nadu. He was elected from Attur as an All India Anna Dravida Munnetra Kazhagam candidate in 2021.

== Elections contested ==
Election	Constituency	Party	Result	Vote %	Runner-up	Runner-up Party	Runner-up vote %	Ref.
2021 Tamil Nadu Legislative Assembly election	Attur	ADMK	Won	48.16%	K. Chinnadurai	DMK	43.99%	
