= M. P. Subramaniam =

Indian politician

Member of the Madras State Assembly
- In office 1952–1957
- Preceded by: P. Sellamuthu Padayachi
- Constituency: Attur

Personal details
- Party: Independent politician

M. P. Subramaniam was an Indian politician from Tamil Nadu who joined the Indian National Congress.

Subramaniam was a member of the Tamil Nadu Assembly, representing Attur constituency in Salem district for two terms. He was first elected as an independent candidate in 1952; in 1957, he represented the Dravida Munnetra Kazhagam party. Subramaniam was the TNCC president from 1980 to 1983, and the opposition leader of the Legislative Council from 1984 until it was dissolved in 1986 by the then All-India Anna Dravida Munnetra Kazhagam Government.

When the late Sivaji Ganesan floated his own political party, Tamizhaga Munnetra Munnani in 1989, Subramaniam joined him, serving as working president until he returned to the Congress. He contested unsuccessfully from the South Chennai Parliamentary constituency in 1998. Subramaniam died on 12 April 2005 in a private hospital.
