= Hafiz Siddiq =

Indian politician (1940-2012)

MP Hafiz Siddiq

Members of the 8th Lok Sabha
- In office 1984–1989
- President: Giani Zail Singh; R. Venkataraman
- Prime Minister: Rajiv Gandhi
- Constituency: Moradabad

Member of Uttar Pradesh Legislative Assembly
- In office 1980–1984
- Governor: Chandeshwar Prasad Narayan Singh
- Chief minister: Vishwanath Pratap Singh; Sripati Mishra
- Constituency: Moradabad Nagar

Personal details
- Born: 1949 Uttar Pradesh, India.
- Died: 13 March 2012 (aged 71–72)
- Party: Indian National Congress
- Spouse: Shamim Fatima
- Children: 6
- Education: Muslim Inter College, Moradabad

Hafiz Mohd. Siddiq (1940 – 13 March 2012) was an Indian politician and member of parliament. He served as a member of the 8th Lok Sabha (1984–89) from Moradabad parliamentary constituency. Prior to participating in Lok Sabha elections, he served as a minister of State for Revenue after electing to Uttar Pradesh Legislative Assembly (1980–84). He was affiliated with the Indian National Congress.

== Biography ==
He was born to Haji Mohd. Ibrahim in 1940 at Moradabad, Uttar Pradesh. He did his matriculation from Muslim Inter College, Moradabad, and later he was appointed a member of Managing Committee, in addition to Muslim Inter College, Moradabad.

He was married to Shamim Fatima, with whom he had six children, including three daughters and three sons.
