= 1984 Indian general election =

- 24, 27 and 28 December 1984

541 of the 543 seats in the Lok Sabha 271 seats needed for a majority
- Registered: 400,375,333
- Turnout: 64.01% (▲7.09pp)
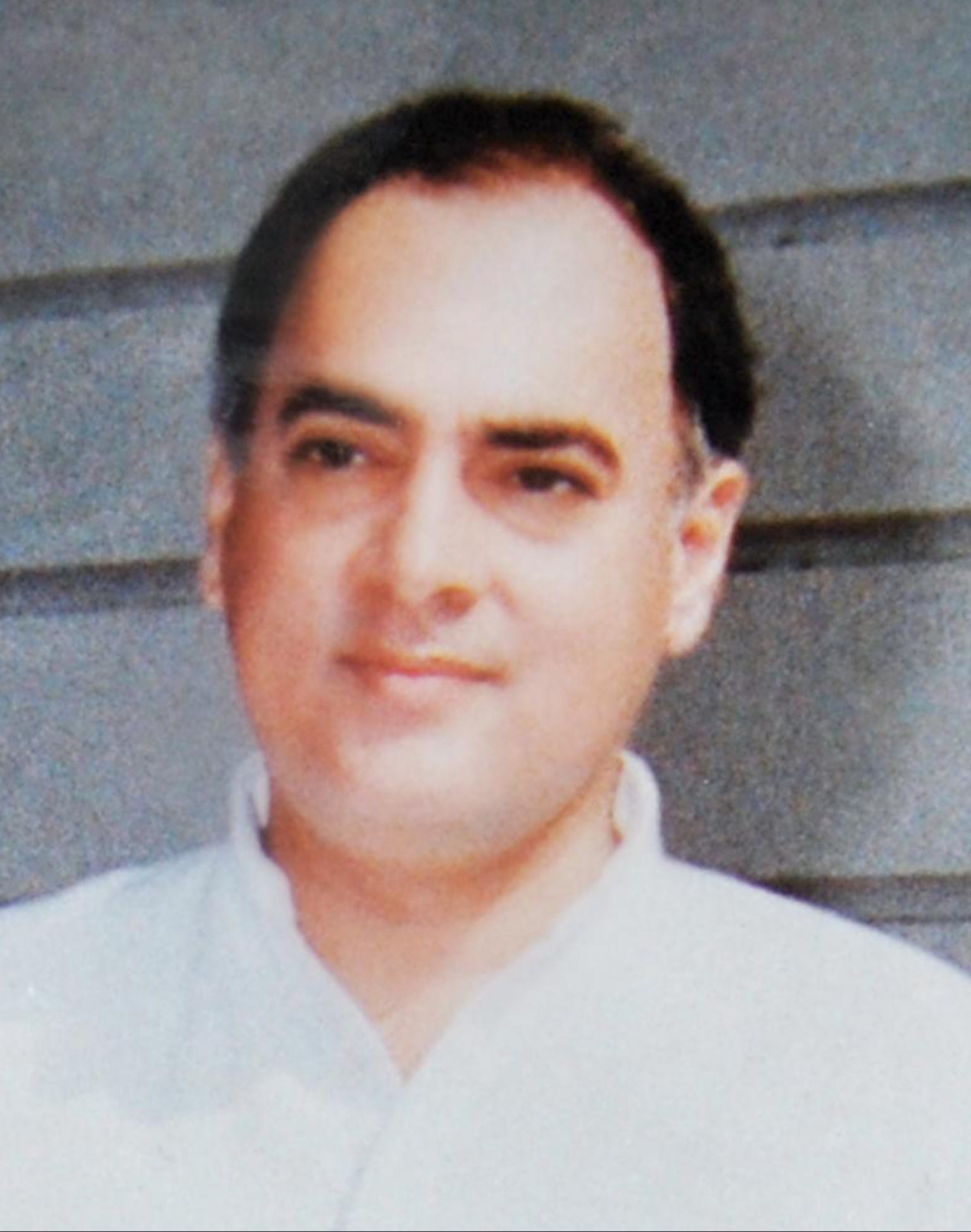

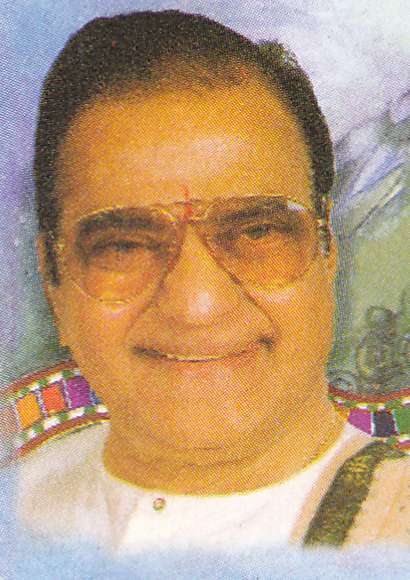

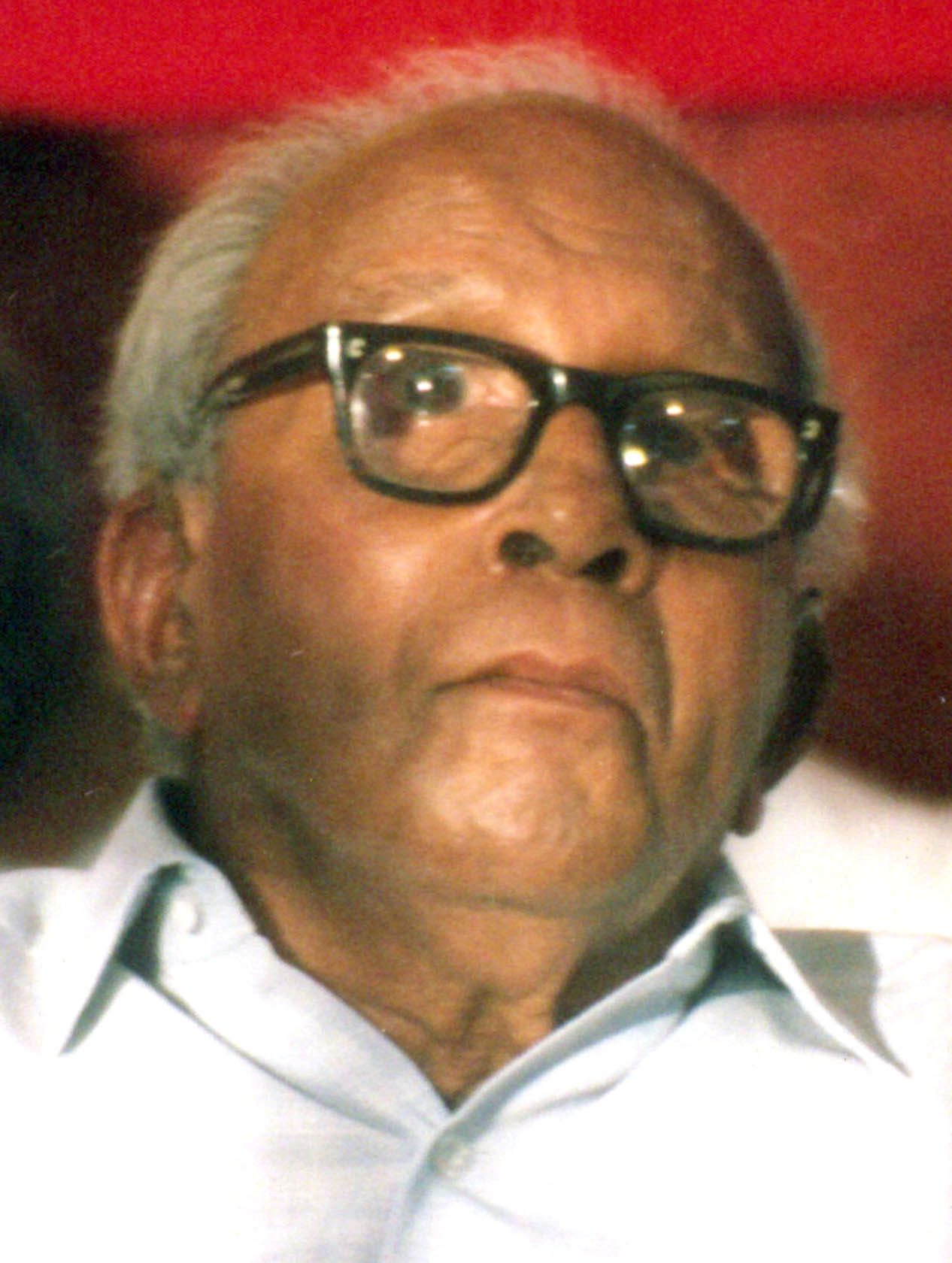

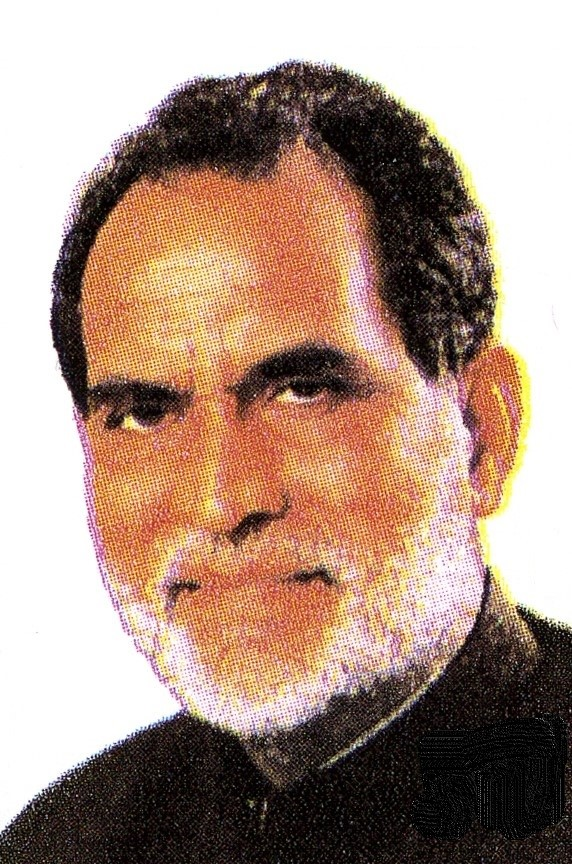

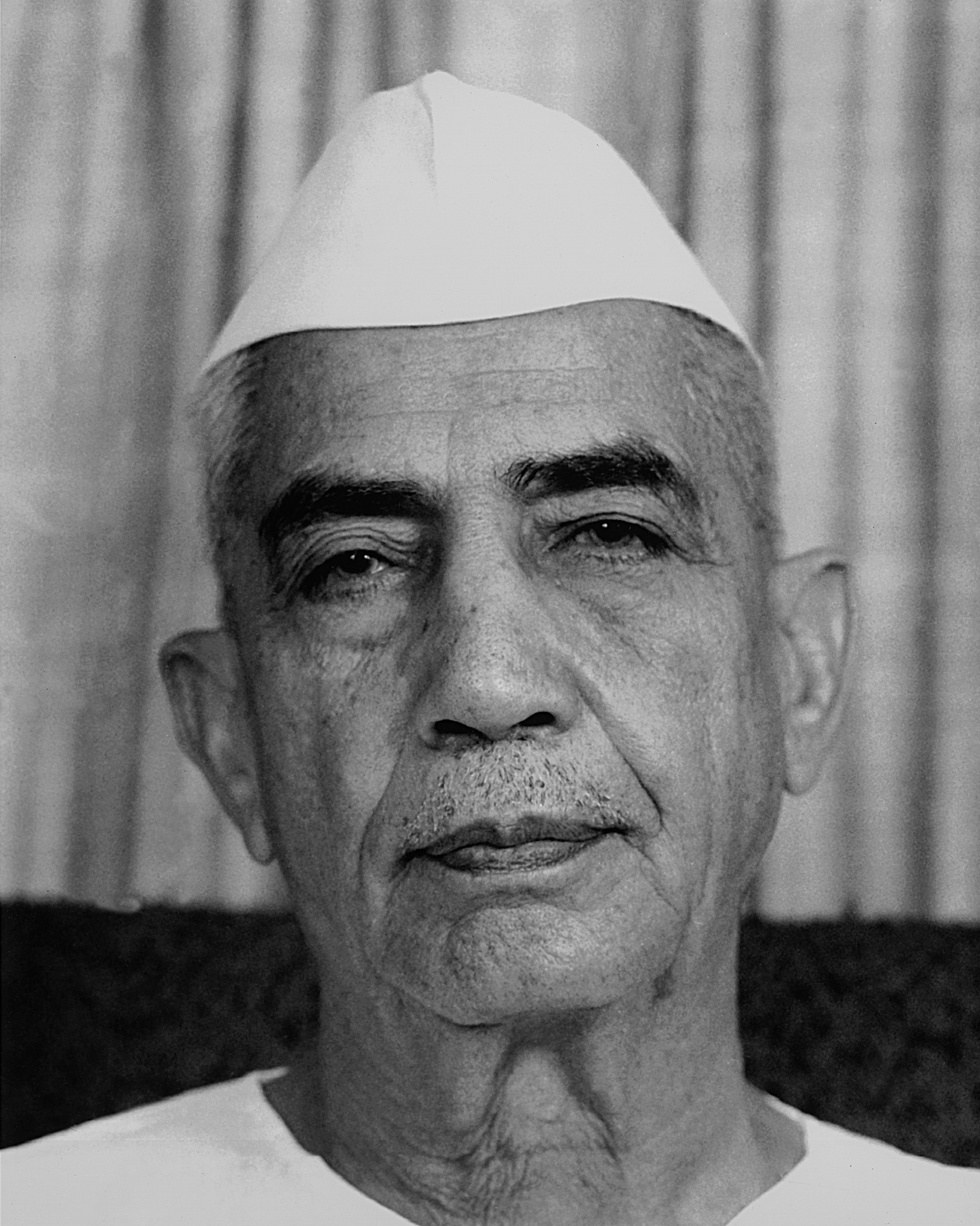

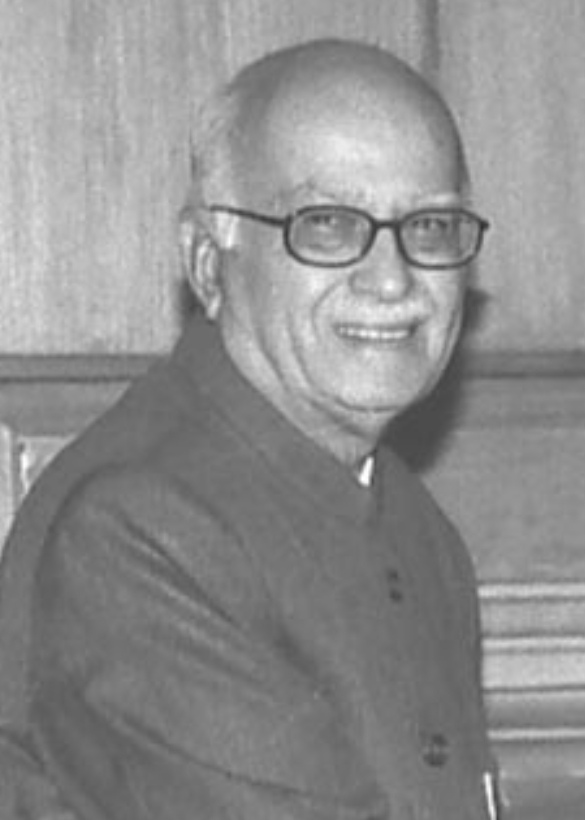
| | First party | Second party | Third party |
|---|---|---|---|
| Leader | Rajiv Gandhi | N. T. Rama Rao | E. M. S. Namboodiripad |
| Party | INC(I) | TDP | CPI(M) |
| Last election | 42.69%, 353 seats | – | 6.24%, 37 seats |
| Seats won | 414 | 30 | 22 |
| Seat change | ▲61 | New | ▼15 |
| Popular vote | 120,107,044 | 10,132,859 | 13,809,950 |
| Percentage | 49.10% | 4.31% | 5.87% |
| Swing | ▲4.17pp | New | ▼0.37pp |
| | Fourth party | Fifth party | Sixth party |
| Leader | Chandra Shekhar | Charan Singh | L. K. Advani |
| Party | JP | LKD | BJP |
| Last election | 18.97%, 31 seats | New | New |
| Seats won | 10 | 3 | 2 |
| Seat change | ▼21 | New | New |
| Popular vote | 16,210,514 | 14,040,064 | 18,202,853 |
| Percentage | 6.89% | 5.97% | 7.74% |
| Swing | ▼12.08pp | New | New |
- Results by constituency
Prime Minister before election
Rajiv Gandhi
INC(I)
Prime Minister after election
Rajiv Gandhi
INC(I)

General elections were held in India on 24, 27 and 28 December 1984, shortly after the assassination of prime minister, Indira Gandhi. Voting was delayed in Assam and Punjab until 1985 due to ongoing insurgency.

The elections were a landslide victory for the Indian National Congress (Indira) of Rajiv Gandhi (son of Indira Gandhi), which won 404 of the 514 seats elected in 1984 and a further 10 in the delayed elections. The Telugu Desam Party of N. T. Rama Rao, a regional political party from the state of Andhra Pradesh, was the second largest party, winning 30 seats, thus achieving the distinction of becoming the first regional party to become a national opposition party. AIADMK of Tamil Nadu contested the election in alliance with the INC (I), and won 12 seats.

Voting was held immediately after the assassination of Indira Gandhi and the 1984 anti-Sikh riots in November. Congress (Indira) received significant support due to an outpouring of public grief at Gandhi's death. Voting was delayed in the Sikh-majority state of Punjab, while the Assam movement and sporadic violence in Mizoram by the Mizo National Front as a part of its uprising against the government saw voting being delayed in these states.

The 1984 elections were the last in which a single party won a majority of seats until 2014, and the only time to date in which a party won more than 400 seats.

== Results ==
| Party | Votes | % | Seats |
|---|---|---|---|
| Indian National Congress (Indira) | 115,478,267 | 49.10 | 404 |
| Bharatiya Janata Party | 18,202,853 | 7.74 | 2 |
| Janata Party | 16,210,514 | 6.89 | 10 |
| Lokdal | 14,040,064 | 5.97 | 3 |
| Communist Party of India (Marxist) | 13,809,950 | 5.87 | 22 |
| Telugu Desam Party | 10,132,859 | 4.31 | 30 |
| Communist Party of India | 6,363,430 | 2.71 | 6 |
| Dravida Munnetra Kazhagam | 5,695,179 | 2.42 | 2 |
| All India Anna Dravida Munnetra Kazhagam | 3,968,967 | 1.69 | 12 |
| Indian Congress (Socialist) | 3,577,377 | 1.52 | 4 |
| Indian National Congress (Jagjivan) | 1,511,515 | 0.64 | 1 |
| Revolutionary Socialist Party | 1,173,869 | 0.50 | 3 |
| All India Forward Bloc | 1,055,556 | 0.45 | 2 |
| Jammu & Kashmir National Conference | 1,010,243 | 0.43 | 3 |
| Indian Union Muslim League | 658,821 | 0.28 | 2 |
| Kerala Congress (Joseph) | 598,113 | 0.25 | 2 |
| Doordarshi Party | 508,426 | 0.22 | 0 |
| Peasants and Workers Party of India | 463,963 | 0.20 | 1 |
| Jharkhand Mukti Morcha | 332,403 | 0.14 | 0 |
| Kerala Congress | 258,591 | 0.11 | 0 |
| All India Muslim League | 224,155 | 0.10 | 0 |
| Gandhi Kamraj National Congress | 217,104 | 0.09 | 0 |
| Socialist Unity Centre of India | 196,767 | 0.08 | 0 |
| Republican Party of India (Khobragade) | 165,320 | 0.07 | 0 |
| Manipur Peoples Party | 149,019 | 0.06 | 0 |
| Tamil Nadu Congress (K) | 144,076 | 0.06 | 0 |
| Naga National Democratic Party | 113,919 | 0.05 | 0 |
| Jammu & Kashmir Panthers Party | 95,149 | 0.04 | 0 |
| Maharashtrawadi Gomantak Party | 83,122 | 0.04 | 0 |
| People's Party of Arunachal | 78,455 | 0.03 | 0 |
| Republican Party of India | 22,877 | 0.01 | 0 |
| Jharkhand Party | 18,837 | 0.01 | 0 |
| Jammu & Kashmir Peoples Conference | 646 | 0.00 | 0 |
| Independents | 18,623,803 | 7.92 | 5 |
| Appointed Anglo-Indians | | | 2 |
| Total | 235,184,209 | 100.00 | 516 |
| Valid votes | 235,184,209 | 97.49 | |
| Invalid/blank votes | 6,062,678 | 2.51 | |
| Total votes | 241,246,887 | 100.00 | |
| Registered voters/turnout | 379,540,608 | 63.56 | |
Source: ECI

=== Delayed elections in Assam and Punjab ===
Results from 1985

The elections in Punjab were held in September 1985 after the signing of the Rajiv–Longowal Accord between Prime Minister Rajiv Gandhi and Akali leader Harchand Singh Longowal on 24 July 1985. The elections were held alongside elections to the Punjab Legislative Assembly. In Assam elections were held in December 1985 after the signing of the Assam Accord in August 1985.

| Party | Votes | % | Seats |
|---|---|---|---|
| Indian National Congress (Indira) | 4,628,777 | 32.14 | 10 |
| Shiromani Akali Dal | 2,577,279 | 17.90 | 7 |
| Communist Party of India (Marxist) | 462,576 | 3.21 | 0 |
| Indian Congress (Socialist) | 457,705 | 3.18 | 1 |
| Communist Party of India | 369,687 | 2.57 | 0 |
| Plain Tribals Council of Assam | 310,150 | 2.15 | 1 |
| Bharatiya Janata Party | 263,284 | 1.83 | 0 |
| Janata Party | 420,082 | 2.92 | 0 |
| Lokdal | 46,627 | 0.32 | 0 |
| Independents | 4,864,958 | 33.78 | 8 |
| Total | 14,401,125 | 100.00 | 27 |
| Valid votes | 14,401,125 | 95.70 | |
| Invalid/blank votes | 646,951 | 4.30 | |
| Total votes | 15,048,076 | 100.00 | |
| Registered voters/turnout | 20,834,725 | 72.23 | |
Source: ECI

=== Results by state/union territory ===
| State/Union Territory | Seats | | | | | |
| State/Union Territory | Seats | INC | Left | TDP | IND | OTH |
| A & N Islands | 1 | 1 | —N/a | —N/a | —N/a | —N/a |
| Andhra Pradesh | 42 | 6 | 2 | 30 | 1 | 3 |
| Arunachal Pradesh | 2 | 2 | —N/a | —N/a | —N/a | —N/a |
| Assam | 14 | 4 | —N/a | —N/a | 8 | 2 |
| Bihar | 54 | 48 | 2 | —N/a | 1 | 3 |
| Chandigarh | 1 | 1 | —N/a | —N/a | —N/a | —N/a |
| Dadra & Nagar Haveli | 1 | —N/a | —N/a | —N/a | 1 | —N/a |
| Delhi | 7 | 7 | —N/a | —N/a | —N/a | —N/a |
| Goa, Daman and Diu | 2 | 2 | —N/a | —N/a | —N/a | —N/a |
| Gujarat | 26 | 24 | —N/a | —N/a | —N/a | 2 |
| Haryana | 10 | 10 | —N/a | —N/a | —N/a | —N/a |
| Himachal Pradesh | 4 | 4 | —N/a | —N/a | —N/a | —N/a |
| Jammu & Kashmir | 6 | 3 | —N/a | —N/a | —N/a | 3 |
| Karnataka | 28 | 24 | —N/a | —N/a | —N/a | 4 |
| Kerala | 20 | 13 | 1 | —N/a | —N/a | 6 |
| Lakshadweep | 1 | 1 | —N/a | —N/a | —N/a | —N/a |
| Madhya Pradesh | 40 | 40 | —N/a | —N/a | —N/a | —N/a |
| Maharashtra | 48 | 43 | —N/a | —N/a | 1 | 4 |
| Manipur | 2 | 2 | —N/a | —N/a | —N/a | —N/a |
| Meghalaya | 2 | 2 | —N/a | —N/a | —N/a | —N/a |
| Nagaland | 1 | 1 | —N/a | —N/a | —N/a | —N/a |
| Orissa | 21 | 20 | —N/a | —N/a | —N/a | 1 |
| Pondicherry | 1 | 1 | —N/a | —N/a | —N/a | —N/a |
| Punjab | 13 | 6 | —N/a | —N/a | —N/a | 7 |
| Rajasthan | 25 | 25 | —N/a | —N/a | —N/a | —N/a |
| Sikkim | 1 | —N/a | —N/a | —N/a | 1 | —N/a |
| Tamil Nadu | 39 | 25 | —N/a | —N/a | —N/a | 14 |
| Tripura | 2 | —N/a | 2 | —N/a | —N/a | —N/a |
| Uttar Pradesh | 85 | 83 | —N/a | —N/a | —N/a | 2 |
| West Bengal | 42 | 16 | 26 | —N/a | —N/a | —N/a |
| Total | 541 | 414 | 33 | 30 | 13 | 51 |

- NOTE:
- The LF (Left Front) consisted of the CPI(M), CPI, RSP, and AIFB.
- The results include the 1984 General Election and the delayed 1985 elections in Assam and Punjab.

== See also ==
- List of members of the 8th Lok Sabha
- 1984 Indian general election by state or union territory
