= A. Nallathambi (AIADMK politician) =

Indian politician

Member of the Tamil Nadu Legislative Assembly
- Incumbent
- Assumed office 12 May 2021
- Preceded by: A. Maruthamuthu
- Constituency: Gangavalli

Personal details
- Born: 1965 (age 60–61) Gangavalli, Salem, Tamil Nadu, India
- Party: All India Anna Dravida Munnetra Kazhagam
- Parent: Angamuthu (father)

Angamuthu Nallathambi is an Indian politician from Gangavalli. He is a member of the All India Anna Dravida Munnetra Kazhagam party. He was elected as a member of Tamil Nadu Legislative Assembly from Gangavalli (state assembly constituency) in May 2021.

== Early life ==
His father's name is Angamuthu and his educational qualification is 5th standard pass. As of May 2021 he is 56 years old.

== Elections contested ==
Election	Constituency	Party	Result	Vote %	Runner-up	Runner-up Party	Runner-up vote %	Ref.
2021 Tamil Nadu Legislative Assembly election	Gangavalli	ADMK	Won	47.89%	J. Rekha Priyadharshini	DMK	43.96%	
