= Chinnasalem Assembly constituency =

Former legislative Assembly constituency in Tamil Nadu, India

Coordinates: 11.649546°N 78.859863°E

Chinnasalem
- Former constituency for the Tamil Nadu Legislative Assembly

Constituency details
- Country: India
- Region: South India
- State: Tamil Nadu
- District: Kallakurichi
- Lok Sabha constituency: Rasipuram
- Established: 1977
- Abolished: 2008
- Total electors: 1,79,669
- Reservation: None

Chinnasalem was a state assembly constituency in Kallakurichi district in Tamil Nadu. The constituency was formed after the discontinuation of Kallakurichi constituency and was in existence from 1977 until the 2008 delimitation. This constituency was discontinued by Election Commission Of India by converting it into Kallakurichi Assembly constituency from the 2011 election onwards.

== Members of the Legislative Assembly ==
| Election | Member | Party |
|---|---|---|
| 1977 | M. Subramanian | All India Anna Dravida Munnetra Kazhagam |
| 1980 | S. Sivaraman | Indian National Congress |
| 1984 | S. Sivaraman | Independent politician |
| 1989 | T. Udhayasuriyan | Dravida Munnetra Kazhagam |
| 1991 | R. P. Paramasivam | All India Anna Dravida Munnetra Kazhagam |
| 1996 | R. Mookappan | Dravida Munnetra Kazhagam |
| 2001 | P. Mohan | All India Anna Dravida Munnetra Kazhagam |
| 2006 | T. Udhayasuriyan | Dravida Munnetra Kazhagam |

== Election results ==
=== Assembly election 2006 ===
2006 Tamil Nadu Legislative Assembly election : Chinnasalem
| Party | Candidate | Votes | % | ±% |
|---|---|---|---|---|
| DMK | T. Udhayasuriyan | 64,036 | 48.40% | ▲4.77 |
| AIADMK | P. Mohan | 43,758 | 33.08% | New |
| DMDK | R. Subbarayalu | 19,476 | 14.72% | New |
| Independent | M. P. Mannan | 1,892 | 1.43% | |
| BSP | M. Kalaivendhan | 840 | 0.63% | New |
| BJP | Pon. Bala Subramanian | 806 | 0.61% | New |
| Margin of victory | | 20,278 | 15.33% | ▲7.60 |
| Turnout | | 132,301 | 73.64% | ▲9.43 |
| Total valid votes | | 132,298 | | |
| Registered electors | | 179,669 | | ▼2.18 |
| DMK gain from AIADMK | | Swing | ▼2.95 | |

=== Assembly election 2001 ===
2001 Tamil Nadu Legislative Assembly election : Chinnasalem
| Party | Candidate | Votes | % | ±% |
|---|---|---|---|---|
| AIADMK | P. Mohan | 60,554 | 51.35% | ▲19.79 |
| DMK | R. Mookappan | 51,442 | 43.63% | ▼16.20 |
| MDMK | A. Vaithilingam | 2,285 | 1.94% | ▲0.44 |
| Independent | A. Manamohandoss | 1,843 | 1.56% | |
| Independent | K. Sekar | 1,220 | 1.03% | |
| Margin of victory | | 9,112 | 7.73% | ▼20.54 |
| Turnout | | 117,934 | 64.21% | ▼4.88 |
| Total valid votes | | 117,916 | | |
| Rejected ballots | | 18 | 0.02% | ▼4.59 |
| Registered electors | | 183,679 | | ▲8.89 |
| AIADMK gain from DMK | | Swing | ▼8.48 | |

=== Assembly election 1996 ===
1996 Tamil Nadu Legislative Assembly election : Chinnasalem
| Party | Candidate | Votes | % | ±% |
|---|---|---|---|---|
| DMK | R. Mookappan | 66,981 | 59.83% | ▲32.98 |
| AIADMK | P. Mohan | 35,336 | 31.56% | New |
| AIIC(T) | K. Narkunam | 6,604 | 5.90% | New |
| MDMK | K. Venkatapathy | 1,684 | 1.50% | New |
| Margin of victory | | 31,645 | 28.27% | ▼9.30 |
| Turnout | | 116,540 | 69.09% | ▲1.88 |
| Total valid votes | | 111,956 | | |
| Rejected ballots | | 5,369 | 4.61% | ▲1.27 |
| Registered electors | | 168,685 | | ▲5.45 |
| DMK gain from AIADMK | | Swing | ▼4.60 | |

=== Assembly election 1991 ===
1991 Tamil Nadu Legislative Assembly election : Chinnasalem
| Party | Candidate | Votes | % | ±% |
|---|---|---|---|---|
| AIADMK | R. P. Paramasivam | 66,942 | 64.43% | New |
| DMK | R. Mookappan | 27,900 | 26.85% | ▼9.43 |
| PMK | M. Vayapuri | 5,603 | 5.39% | New |
| AAP | A. Subramaniyam | 2,618 | 2.52% | New |
| Independent | P. Preamanandan | 649 | 0.62% | |
| Margin of victory | | 39,042 | 37.57% | ▲24.21 |
| Turnout | | 107,512 | 67.21% | ▼7.89 |
| Total valid votes | | 103,906 | | |
| Rejected ballots | | 3,589 | 3.34% | ▲1.02 |
| Registered electors | | 159,970 | | ▲15.78 |
| AIADMK gain from DMK | | Swing | ▲28.15 | |

=== Assembly election 1989 ===
1989 Tamil Nadu Legislative Assembly election : Chinnasalem
| Party | Candidate | Votes | % | ±% |
|---|---|---|---|---|
| DMK | T. Udhayasuriyan | 36,776 | 36.28% | ▼0.07 |
| AIADMK | K. R. Ramalingam | 23,238 | 22.93% | New |
| INC | S. Sivaraman | 21,526 | 21.24% | New |
| Independent | P. Mohan | 10,546 | 10.41% | |
| Independent | N. Dhanabal | 6,676 | 6.59% | |
| Independent | K. Jayaram | 1,911 | 1.89% | |
| Margin of victory | | 13,538 | 13.36% | ▼13.93 |
| Turnout | | 103,765 | 75.10% | ▲0.07 |
| Total valid votes | | 101,354 | | |
| Rejected ballots | | 2,411 | 2.32% | ▼2.31 |
| Registered electors | | 138,166 | | ▲17.34 |
| DMK gain from Independent | | Swing | ▼27.37 | |

=== Assembly election 1984 ===
1984 Tamil Nadu Legislative Assembly election : Chinnasalem
| Party | Candidate | Votes | % | ±% |
|---|---|---|---|---|
| Independent | S. Sivaraman | 53,630 | 63.65% | |
| DMK | D. Periyasamy | 30,633 | 36.35% | New |
| Margin of victory | | 22,997 | 27.29% | ▲20.30 |
| Turnout | | 88,350 | 75.03% | ▲8.95 |
| Total valid votes | | 84,263 | | |
| Rejected ballots | | 4,087 | 4.63% | ▲2.89 |
| Registered electors | | 117,749 | | ▲1.87 |
| Independent gain from INC | | Swing | ▲11.20 | |

=== Assembly election 1980 ===
1980 Tamil Nadu Legislative Assembly election : Chinnasalem
| Party | Candidate | Votes | % | ±% |
|---|---|---|---|---|
| INC | S. Sivaraman | 39,370 | 52.45% | ▲38.70 |
| AIADMK | A. Ambayiram | 34,123 | 45.46% | New |
| Independent | V. Kuppan | 1,562 | 2.08% | |
| Margin of victory | | 5,247 | 6.99% | ▲2.27 |
| Turnout | | 76,384 | 66.08% | ▲3.60 |
| Total valid votes | | 75,055 | | |
| Rejected ballots | | 1,329 | 1.74% | ▼0.07 |
| Registered electors | | 115,587 | | ▲3.79 |
| INC gain from AIADMK | | Swing | ▲16.88 | |

=== Assembly election 1977 ===
1977 Tamil Nadu Legislative Assembly election : Chinnasalem
| Party | Candidate | Votes | % | ±% |
|---|---|---|---|---|
| AIADMK | M. Subramanian | 24,304 | 35.57% | New |
| DMK | S. P. Pachayappan | 21,081 | 30.86% | New |
| JP | V. Jayalakshmi | 12,638 | 18.50% | New |
| INC | L. P. Ponnuvel | 9,397 | 13.75% | New |
| Independent | P. R. Annamal | 529 | 0.77% | New |
| Margin of victory | | 3,223 | 4.72% | |
| Turnout | | 69,581 | 62.48% | |
| Total valid votes | | 68,321 | | |
| Rejected ballots | | 1,260 | 1.81% | |
| Registered electors | | 111,367 | | |
| AIADMK win (new seat) | | | | |
