= K. Kandasamy =

Indian politician

K. Kandasamy is an Indian politician and former Member of Parliament of India from Thiruchengode Constituency.
