= Othiyathur =

Othiyathur Othiyathur
- Village
- Location in Tamil Nadu, India Othiyathur (India)
- Coordinates: 11.599341°N 78.597752°E
- Country: India
- State: Tamil Nadu
- District: Salem
- Elevation: 212 m (696 ft)

Population (2010)
  - Total: 3,465

Languages
  - Official: Tamil
- Time zone: UTC+5:30 (IST)
- PIN: 636 105
- Telephone code: 04282

Othiyathur is a large village located in Gangavalli of Salem district, Tamil Nadu with total 933 families. The Othiyathur village has population of 3465 of which 1771 are males while 1694 are females as per Population 2011.

In Othiyathur village population of children with age 0-6 is 330 which makes up 9.52 % of total population of village. Average Sex Ratio of Othiyathur village is 957 which is lower than Tamil Nadu state average of 996. Child Sex Ratio for the Othiyathur as per is 897, lower than Tamil Nadu average of 943.

Othiyathur village has lower rate compared to Tamil Nadu. In 2011, rate of Othiyathur village was 71.77 % compared to 80.09 % of Tamil Nadu. In Othiyathur Male stands at 78.90 % while female rate was 64.37 %.

As per constitution of India and Panchyati Raaj Act, Othiyathur village is by Sarpanch (Head of Village) who is elected representative of village.

== Economy ==
In Othiyathur village out of total population, 2187 were engaged in work activities. 99.82 % of workers describe their work as Main Work (Employment or Earning more than 6 Months) while 0.18 % were involved in Marginal activity providing for less than 6 months. Of 2187 workers engaged in Main Work, 700 were (owner or co-owner) while 1296 were labourer.

== Transportation ==
Nearest airport is Salem Airport which is 65 km away from Othiyathur.

Nearest railway station is Attur (ATU) which is 10 km away from Othiyathur.

== Places of worship ==
1. Saint Maria magdalene catholic church
2. Goddess Mariammal
3. Goddess Selliamman

== Educational Institutions ==
1. Government Panchayat Union Middle School, Othiyathur
2. Golden Polytechnic College, Gangavalli, Salem
