= K. Parthasarathi =

Indian politician

K. Parthasarathi was an Indian politician of the Indian National Congress and Member of the Legislative Assembly of Madras state. He served as the Deputy Speaker of the Madras Legislative Assembly from 1962 to 1967.
