= S. Madheswaran =

Indian politician

S. Madheswaran is an Indian politician and former member of the Tamil Nadu Legislative Assembly from the Attur constituency. He represented the All India Anna Dravida Munnetra Kazhagam party.
