= B. Devarajan =

Indian politician

B. Devarajan was an Indian politician and former Member of Parliament elected from Tamil Nadu. He was elected to the Lok Sabha, lower house of India's parliament, from Rasipuram constituency as an Indian National Congress candidate in the state general elections in 1977, 1980, 1984, 1989 and 1991.
