= T. Udhayasuriyan =

Indian politician

T. Udhayasuriyan is an Indian politician and a Member of the Legislative Assembly of Tamil Nadu. He is member of the Dravida Munnetra Kazhagam party.

Udhayasuriyan was elected to the Tamil Nadu legislative assembly as a Dravida Munnetra Kazhagam (DMK) candidate from Chinnasalem constituency in the 1989, later he was disqualified by Madras high court due to fake/altered age proof certificate to contest election and 2006 elections and from Sankarapuram constituency in the 1996 and 2016 elections.

== Member of Legislative Assembly ==
=== 2021–present ===
He represents the Sankarapuram Assembly constituency as Member of Legislative Assembly (MLA) in Tamil Nadu Assembly.

Committee assignments of 16th Tamil Nadu Assembly

- Chairman (2021–23) Committee on Government Assurances
