= K. Chinnadurai =

Indian politician

K. Chinnadurai was elected to the Tamil Nadu Legislative Assembly from the Talavasal constituency in the 2006 elections. He was a candidate of the Dravida Munnetra Kazhagam (DMK) party.
